= In the Beginning (Journey album) =

Compilation album by Journey
- Released: November 1979
- Genre: Progressive rock; hard rock
- Length: 75:24
- Label: Columbia
- Producer: Roy Halee, Glen Kolotkin, Journey

Journey chronology
| Evolution (1979) | In the Beginning (1979) | Departure (1980) |

Professional ratings
Review scores
| Source | Rating |
|---|---|
| AllMusic | 2/5 stars |

In the Beginning is the first compilation album from the American rock band Journey, containing songs from the group's first three albums (Journey, Look into the Future, and Next). The songs on this album are all taken from the period when Gregg Rolie sang lead vocals, before Steve Perry joined the band as their new lead singer in 1977.

== Track listing ==
Side one
| No. | Title | Writer(s) | Length |
|---|---|---|---|
| 1. | "Of a Lifetime" | Gregg Rolie; George Tickner; Neal Schon | 6:48 |
| 2. | "Topaz" | Tickner | 6:09 |
| 3. | "Kohoutek" | Schon; Rolie | 6:40 |
| Total length: | | | 19:37 |

Side two
| No. | Title | Writer(s) | Length |
|---|---|---|---|
| 1. | "On a Saturday Night" | Rolie | 3:55 |
| 2. | "It's All Too Much" | George Harrison | 4:01 |
| 3. | "In My Lonely Feeling / Conversations" | Rolie; Ross Valory | 4:56 |
| 4. | "Mystery Mountain" | Rolie; Tickner; Diane Valory | 4:23 |
| Total length: | | | 17:15 |

Side three
| No. | Title | Writer(s) | Length |
|---|---|---|---|
| 1. | "Spaceman" | Rolie; Aynsley Dunbar | 4:00 |
| 2. | "People" | Schon; Rolie; Dunbar | 5:19 |
| 3. | "Anyway" | Rolie | 4:10 |
| 4. | "You're on Your Own" | Schon; Rolie; Tickner | 5:52 |
| Total length: | | | 19:21 |

Side four
| No. | Title | Writer(s) | Length |
|---|---|---|---|
| 1. | "Look into the Future" | Schon; Rolie; D. Valory | 8:08 |
| 2. | "Nickel and Dime" | R. Valory; Schon; Rolie; Tickner | 4:11 |
| 3. | "I'm Gonna Leave You" | Schon; Rolie; Tickner | 6:56 |
| Total length: | | | 19:15 |
