= List of 2023 deaths in popular music =

This is a list of notable performers of rock music and other forms of popular music, and others directly associated with the music as producers, songwriters, or in other closely related roles, who died in 2023.

== 2023 deaths in popular music ==
Preceded by 2022	List of deaths in popular music 2023	Succeeded by 2024

Name	Age	Date	Location of death	Cause of death
Fred White; Earth, Wind & Fire	67	January 1, 2023	Los Angeles, California, United States	Undisclosed causes
Sebastian Marino; Overkill, Anvil	57	January 1, 2023	Florida, United States	Heart attack
Gangsta Boo; Three 6 Mafia	43	January 1, 2023	Memphis, Tennessee United States	Overdose of cocaine, fentanyl, and alcohol
Donatas Čižauskas; Member of 2 Donatai	33	January 2, 2023	Lithuania	Suicide
Kingsize Taylor; Kingsize Taylor and the Dominoes	83	January 2, 2023	Southport, England	Undisclosed
Jeremiah "Ekoe Alexanda" Buckner; Member of Linkin Bridge	43	January 3, 2023	Louisville, Kentucky, United States	Murder
Alan Rankine; The Associates	64	January 3, 2023	Scotland	Heart disease
Gordy Harmon; The Whispers	79	January 5, 2023	Los Angeles, California, United States	Undisclosed causes
Jeff Blackburn; Blackburn & Snow, Moby Grape, The Ducks	77	January 6, 2023	Santa Cruz, California, United States	Undisclosed
Dennis Budimir; The Wrecking Crew	84	January 10, 2023	United States	Undisclosed causes
Jeff Beck; The Yardbirds, The Jeff Beck Group, Beck, Bogert & Appice	78	January 10, 2023	East Sussex, England	Bacterial meningitis
Yukihiro Takahashi; Yellow Magic Orchestra, Sadistic Mika Band, Metafive	70	January 11, 2023	Karuizawa, Nagano, Japan	Pneumonia
Lisa Marie Presley; Singer-songwriter; daughter of Elvis Presley	54	January 12, 2023	Los Angeles, California, United States	Cardiac arrest from complications of bariatric surgery
Robbie Bachman; Bachman-Turner Overdrive, Brave Belt	69	January 12, 2023	Vancouver, Canada	Undisclosed causes
Keith "Duke" Beaton; Blue Magic	72	January 13, 2023	Pennsylvania, United States	Undisclosed causes
Bruce Gowers; Event producer and music video director	82	January 15, 2023	Santa Monica, California, United States	Acute respiratory infection
C. J. Harris; Singer	31	January 15, 2023	Jasper, Alabama, United States	Heart attack
Johnny Powers; Rockabilly guitarist and singer	84	January 16, 2023	Michigan, United States	Undisclosed causes
Larry Morris; Larry's Rebels	75	January 17, 2023	Auckland, New Zealand	Long illness
Renée Geyer; Singer	69	January 17, 2023	Geelong Victoria, Australia	Complications from hip surgery
Van Conner; Screaming Trees	55	January 18, 2023	Seattle, Washington, United States	Pneumonia
Vitalija Katunskytė; Lithuanian Pop singer	67	January 18, 2023	Šiauliai, Lithuania	Heart failure
David Crosby; The Byrds, Crosby, Stills, Nash & Young	81	January 19, 2023	Santa Ynez, California, United States	COVID-19
Alex Napier; Spice, Uriah Heep	75	January 19, 2023	London, England	Undisclosed
Jerry Blavat; Disc jockey and presenter	82	January 20, 2023	Philadelphia, Pennsylvania, United States	Complications from myasthenia gravis
B.G. the Prince of Rap; Rapper and Eurodance artist	57	January 21, 2023	Wiesbaden, Germany	Prostate cancer
Lin Brehmer; Disc jockey	68	January 22, 2023	Chicago, Illinois, United States	Prostate cancer
Anthony "Top" Topham; The Yardbirds	75	January 23, 2023	London, England	Dementia
Dean Daughtry; Atlanta Rhythm Section, Classics IV	76	January 26, 2023	Huntsville, Alabama, United States	Natural causes
Peter McCann; Songwriter and musician	74	January 26, 2023	Nashville, Tennessee, United States	Undisclosed causes
Floyd Sneed; Three Dog Night	80	January 27, 2023	California, U.S.	Undisclosed
Daniel Boone; Pop musician	80	January 27, 2023	Paignton, Devon, England	Undisclosed
Tom Verlaine; Television	73	January 28, 2023	Manhattan, New York City, New York, United States	Prostate cancer
Barrett Strong; Singer-songwriter	81	January 28, 2023	Detroit, Michigan, United States	Undisclosed causes
Charlie Thomas; The Drifters	85	January 31, 2023	Bowie, Maryland, United States	Liver cancer
George Zukerman; Bassoonist and impresario	95	February 1, 2023	White Rock, British Columbia, Canada	After a brief illness
Tim Quy; Cardiacs	61	February 2, 2023	Barnstaple, North Devon, England	Cancer
Butch Miles; Jazz drummer	78	February 2, 2023	Austin, Texas, United states	Pulmonary fibrosis
Paul Janovitz; Cold Water Flat	54	February 3, 2023	Bedford, Massachusetts, United States	Long illness
Tina Nicoletta Musician	61	February 4, 2023	Rome, Italy	Sudden illness
Lillian Walker-Moss; The Exciters	78	February 5, 2023	Jamaica, Queens, New York City, United States	Angiosarcoma
Phil Spalding; GTR, Original Mirrors, Toyah	65	February 6, 2023	London, England	Undisclosed
Steve Sostak; Sweep the Leg Johnny	49	February 7, 2023	Oakbrook Terrace, Illinois, United States	Undisclosed
Burt Bacharach; Singer-songwriter and pianist	94	February 8, 2023	Los Angeles, California, United States	Natural causes
AKA; Rapper	35	February 10, 2023	Durban, KwaZulu-Natal, South Africa	Shot
David Jude Jolicoeur; De La Soul	54	February 12, 2023	New York City, New York, United States	Congestive heart failure
Alan Wurzburger Italian singer-songwriter	68	February 12, 2023	Naples, Italy	
Huey "Piano" Smith; R&B pianist	89	February 13, 2023	Baton Rouge, Louisiana, United States	Undisclosed
Tim Aymar; Pharaoh, Control Denied	59	February 14, 2023	New Kensington, Pennsylvania, United States	Heart attack
Chuck Jackson; R&B singer	85	February 16, 2023	Atlanta, Georgia, United States	Undisclosed
Alberto Radius; Formula 3	80	February 16, 2023	San Colombano al Lambro, Italy	Long illness
Kyle Jacobs; Country music songwriter, singer, and musician	49	February 17, 2023	Nashville, Tennessee, United States	Suicide by gunshot
Michael "Majk Moti" Kupper; Running Wild	65	February 17, 2023	Preston, England	Undisclosed
Davis Causey; Sea Level	74	February 19, 2023	United States	Undisclosed
Bruce Barthol; Country Joe & the Fish	75	February 20, 2023	Sebastopol, California, United States	Undisclosed
Lyubomir Futorsky; Dead Rooster	50	February 20, 2023	Kyiv, Ukraine	Undisclosed
Ron Altbach; King Harvest	76	February 21, 2023	United States	Undisclosed
Jesse Gress; Guitarist	67	February 21, 2023	Woodstock, New York, United States	Pulmonary fibrosis
Junnosuke Kuroda; Sumika	34	February 23, 2023	Japan	Undisclosed
David Lumsden; Keyboardist and music educator	94	February 25, 2023	Winchester, England	Undisclosed
Hans-Joachim Behrendt; Ideal	68	February 27, 2023	Berlin, Germany	Undisclosed
Yvonne Constant; Singer	92	February 28, 2023	Larmor-Plage, France	Undisclosed
Leon Hughes; The Coasters	92	March 1, 2023	Los Angeles, California, United States	Natural causes
Steve Mackey; Pulp	56	March 2, 2023	Sheffield, England	Undisclosed illness
Wayne Shorter; The Jazz Messengers, Miles Davis Quintet, Weather Report	89	March 2, 2023	Los Angeles, California, United States	Undisclosed
David Lindley; Multi-instrumentalist	78	March 3, 2023	Claremont, California, United States	Kidney damage as a complication of COVID-19
Robert Haimer; Barnes & Barnes	68	March 4, 2023	Los Angeles, California, United States	Undisclosed
Michael Rhodes; The Notorious Cherry Bombs	69	March 4, 2023	Nashville, Tennessee, United States	Pancreatic cancer
Spot; Record producer for Black Flag, Descendents	71	March 4, 2023	Sheboygan, Wisconsin, United States	Complications from stroke
James "Owl" Walsh; Gypsy	74	March 4, 2023	Minneapolis, Minnesota, United States	Congestive heart failure
Gary Rossington; Lynyrd Skynyrd	71	March 5, 2023	Milton, Georgia, United States	Undisclosed
Eric Alan Livingston; Mamaleek	38	March 6, 2023	San Francisco Bay Area, California, United States	Undisclosed
Josua Madsen; Artillery	45	March 8, 2023	Copenhagen, Denmark	Bus accident
Robin Lumley; Brand X, The Spiders from Mars	74	March 9, 2023	Plymouth, England	Heart Failure
Napoleon XIV; Singer-songwriter	84	March 10, 2023	Phoenixville, Pennsylvania, United States	Complications from Dementia & Parkinson's Disease
Costa Titch; Amapiano rapper and dancer	28	March 11, 2023	Johannesburg, Gauteng, South Africa	Collapsed on stage
Canisso; Bassist for Raimundos	57	March 13, 2023	São Paulo, Brazil	Undisclosed
Simon Emmerson; Afro Celt Sound System	67	March 13, 2023	Dorchester, Dorset, England	Long illness
Jim Gordon; Derek and the Dominos, Traffic, Delaney & Bonnie and Friends	77	March 13, 2023	Vacaville, California, United States	Natural causes
Bobby Caldwell; Singer-songwriter and musician	71	March 14, 2023	Great Meadows, New Jersey, United States	Long illness
Tony Coe; Jazz musician	88	March 16, 2023	Canterbury, Kent, England	Undisclosed
Fuzzy Haskins; Parliament-Funkadelic	81	March 17, 2023	Grosse Pointe Woods, Michigan, United States	Complications of diabetes
Mick Slattery; Hawkwind	77	March 17, 2023	United Kingdom	Short illness
Dima Nova; Cream Soda	35	March 20, 2023	Volga, Russia	Drowned
Tom Leadon; Mudcrutch	70	March 22, 2023	United States	Natural causes
Wayne Swinny; Saliva	59	March 22, 2023	Pittsburgh, Pennsylvania, United States	Brain hemorrhage
Luca Bergia; Drummer for Marlene Kuntz	54	March 23, 2023	Cuneo, Italy	Undisclosed causes
Nick Lloyd Webber; Composer and record producer; son of Andrew Lloyd Webber	43	March 25, 2023	Basingstoke, Hampshire, England	Gastric cancer
Ray Pillow; Singer	85	March 26, 2023	Nashville, Tennessee, United States	Undisclosed
Howie Kane; Jay and the Americans	81	March 27, 2023	United States	Undisclosed
Ryuichi Sakamoto; Yellow Magic Orchestra	71	March 28, 2023	Tokyo, Japan	Cancer
Brian Gillis; LFO	47	March 29, 2023	Springfield, Massachusetts, United States	Undisclosed
Sweet Charles Sherrell; James Brown's band, The J.B.'s	80	March 29, 2023	Netherlands	Emphysema
Ray Shulman; Gentle Giant	73	March 30, 2023	London, England	Long illness
Alfio Cantarella Italian drummer	81	March 30, 2023	Villafranca di Verona, Italy	
Red Robinson; Disc jockey	86	April 1, 2023	Vancouver, Canada	A brief illness
Seymour Stein; American Hall of Fame Music executive	80	April 2, 2023	Los Angeles, California, United States	Cancer
Vivian Trimble; Luscious Jackson	59	April 4, 2023	United States	Cancer
Guy Bailey; The Quireboys	61	April 6, 2023	United Kingdom	Undisclosed
Paul Cattermole; S Club 7	46	April 6, 2023	Wareham, Dorset, England	Heart failure
Ian Bairnson; The Alan Parsons Project, Pilot	69	April 7, 2023	Surrey, England	Dementia
John Regan; Peter Frampton, Frehley's Comet	71	April 7, 2023	Wappingers Falls, New York, United States	Undisclosed
Lasse Wellander; Guitarist for ABBA	70	April 7, 2023	Bålsta, Sweden	Cancer
Cliff Fish; Paper Lace	73	April 14, 2023	Cyprus	Cancer
Mark Sheehan; The Script	46	April 14, 2023	London, England	Undisclosed illness
Ahmad Jamal; Jazz pianist	92	April 16, 2023	Ashley Falls, Massachusetts, United States	Prostate cancer
April Stevens; Nino Tempo & April Stevens	93	April 17, 2023	Phoenix, Arizona, United States	Undisclosed
Otis Redding III; The Reddings	59	April 18, 2023	Macon, Georgia, United States	Cancer
Moonbin; Astro	25	April 19, 2023	Seoul, Korea	Suicide
Federico Salvatore Italian singer-songwriter and cabaret artist	63	April 19, 2023	Naples, Italy	Cerebral hemorrhage
Mark Stewart; The Pop Group, Mark Stewart & The Maffia, New Age Steppers	62	April 21, 2023	Bristol, England	Undisclosed
Sergio Rendine Italian composer	68	April 21, 2023	Pescara, Italy	Long illness
Ron Cahute; Recording artist and songwriter	68	April 22, 2023	Toronto, Canada	Undisclosed
Keith Gattis; Singer-songwriter, guitarist, record producer	52	April 23, 2023	Nashville, Tennessee, United States	Tractor accident
Harry Belafonte; Singer	96	April 25, 2023	Manhattan, New York City, New York, United States	Congestive heart failure
Billy "The Kid" Emerson; Singer-songwriter	97	April 26, 2023	Clearwater, Florida, United States	Undisclosed
Wee Willie Harris; Rock and roll singer	90	April 27, 2023	United Kingdom	Undisclosed
Tim Bachman; Bachman-Turner Overdrive, Brave Belt	71	April 28, 2023	London, England	Cancer
John Fean; Horslips	71	April 28, 2023	Shannon, County Clare, Ireland	Undisclosed
Gordon Lightfoot; Singer-songwriter	84	May 1, 2023	Toronto, Canada	Natural causes
Linda Lewis; Singer-songwriter	72	May 3, 2023	Waltham Abbey, England	Natural causes
Rob Laakso; Kurt Vile and the Violators, Swirlies	44	May 4, 2023	Fitchburg, Massachusetts	Bile-duct cancer
Chris Strachwitz; Record producer	91	May 5, 2023	San Rafael, California, United States	Undisclosed
Menahem Pressler; Beaux Arts Trio	99	May 6, 2023	London, England	Undisclosed
Rita Lee; Os Mutantes	75	May 8, 2023	São Paulo, Brazil	Lung cancer
Jon Povey; Pretty Things, Bern Elliott and the Fenmen	80	May 9, 2023	Spain	Undisclosed
Francis Monkman; Curved Air, Matching Mole, Sky, 801	73	May 11, 2023	Bedfordshire, England	Cancer
Dum-Dum; Facção Central	54	May 12, 2023	São Paulo, Brazil	Complications from a stroke
Arno Veimer; Terminaator	50	May 13, 2023	Estonia	Undisclosed
John Giblin; Bassist	71	May 14, 2023	Cheltenham, England	Chronic illness
Algy Ward; Tank, The Damned, The Saints	63	May 17, 2023	Royal Tunbridge Wells, England	Undisclosed
Pete Brown; Singer and performance poet	82	May 19, 2023	Hastings, England	Cancer
Andy Rourke; The Smiths	59	May 19, 2023	New York City, New York, United States	Pancreatic cancer
Ed Ames; Ames Brothers	95	May 21, 2023	Los Angeles, California, United States	Alzheimer's disease
Kirk Arrington; Metal Church	61	May 22, 2023	United States	Undisclosed
Chas Newby; The Beatles, The Quarrymen	81	May 22, 2023	London, England	Undisclosed
Mark Adams; Saint Vitus	64	May 23, 2023	Bloomington, Indiana, United States	Parkinson's disease
Redd Holt; The Ramsey Lewis Trio	91	May 23, 2023	Chicago, Illinois, United States	Lung cancer
Sheldon Reynolds; Sun, The Commodores, Earth, Wind & Fire	63	May 23, 2023	Los Angeles, California, U.S.	Undisclosed
Bill Lee; Jazz bassist and composer	94	May 24, 2023	New York City, New York, United States	Undisclosed
Tina Turner; Singer-songwriter	83	May 24, 2023	Küsnacht, Switzerland	After a long illness
İlham Gencer; Turkish jazz musician	101	May 24, 2023	Bodrum, Turkey	Undisclosed
Reuben Wilson; Willis Jackson, Melvin Sparks	88	May 26, 2023	Harlem, New York, United States	Lung cancer
Mordechai Rechtman; Israeli bassonist	97	May 27, 2023	Tel Aviv, Israel	Undisclosed
Dickie Harrell; Gene Vincent and the Blue Caps	82	May 31, 2023	Greenville, South Carolina, United States	Undisclosed
Pacho El Antifeka; Rapper	42	June 1, 2023	Bayamón, Puerto Rico, United States	Shot
Roy Taylor; Jump the Gun	66	June 1, 2023	Dundalk, County Louth, Ireland	Motor neurone disease
Kaija Saariaho; Finnish composer	70	June 2, 2023	Paris, France	Brain cancer
George Winston; Pianist	74	June 4, 2023	Williamsport, Pennsylvania, United States	Cancer
Astrud Gilberto; Brazilian vocalist; sang "The Girl from Ipanema"	83	June 5, 2023	Philadelphia, Pennsylvania, United States	Undisclosed
Tony McPhee; The Groundhogs	79	June 6, 2023	Shropshire, England	Complications from fall and stroke
Maria Doris Italian singer	90	June 6, 2023	San Donà di Piave, Italy	
Peter Belli; Danish singer	79	June 8, 2023	Denmark	Undisclosed
Jack Earls; Rockabilly singer and guitarist	90	June 12, 2023	Madison Heights, Michigan, United States	Undisclosed
Francesco Nuti Italian actor, director, screenwriter, comedian, musician, film producer and singer	68	June 12, 2023	Rome, Italy	Long illness
Christy Dignam; Aslan	63	June 13, 2023	Dublin, Ireland	Multiple myeloma
Blackie Onassis; Urge Overkill	57	June 13, 2023	Los Angeles, California, U.S.	Undisclosed
Sergey Kolchin; Zemlyane	45	June 15, 2023	St. Petersburg, Russia	Undisclosed
Matteo "Costa" Romagnoli Manager of Lo Stato Sociale, founder of Garrincha Dischi	43	June 15, 2023	Bologna, Italy	Long-term disease (desmoid tumor)
Peter Dickinson; Pianist, composter, and musicologist	88	June 16, 2023	Aldeburgh, Suffolk, England	Undisclosed
Big Pokey; Rapper	48	June 18, 2023	Beaumont, Texas, United States	Heart attack (on stage)
Teresa Taylor; Butthole Surfers	60	June 18, 2023	Austin, Texas, United States	Lung disease
John Waddington; The Pop Group, Maximum Joy, Perfume	63	June 20, 2023	Bristol, United Kingdom	Undisclosed
El Pasador Italian composer, keyboard player, arranger, conductor and singer who rose to prominence in the second half of the seventies. His daughter Cristina Zavalloni is also active in the world of music	90	June 20, 2023	Bologna, Italy	
Peter Brötzmann; German jazz musician	82	June 22, 2023	Wuppertal, Germany	Undisclosed
Jesse McReynolds; Jim & Jesse	93	June 23, 2023	Gallatin, Tennessee, United States	Undisclosed
Tapas Das; Indian singer-songwriter and guitarist	68	June 25, 2023	Kolkata, India	Lung cancer
Ysabelle Lacamp; French novelist, actress, and singer	68	June 26, 2023	Paris, France	Cancer
Monte Cazazza; Psychic TV	74	June 27, 2023	San Francisco, California, United States	Undisclosed
Bobby Osborne; Osborne Brothers	91	June 27, 2023	Gallatin, Tennessee, United States	Aging
Clarence Barlow; Composer	77	June 29, 2023	Barcelona, Spain	Injuries sustained in a fall
Rick Froberg; Drive Like Jehu, Hot Snakes	55	June 30, 2023	San Diego County, California, United States	Natural causes
Mo Foster; Musician, composer, record producer	78	July 3, 2023	London, England	Liver and bile duct cancer
Coco Lee; Hong Kong singer	48	July 5, 2023	Hong Kong, China	Suicide
George Tickner; Journey, Frumious Bandersnatch	76	July 5, 2023	Syracuse, New York, United States	Undisclosed
Marcello Colasurdo Italian singer-songwriter	68	July 5, 2023	Naples, Italy	
Caleb Southern; Record producer	53	July 6, 2023	Atlanta, Georgia, United States	Unknown
Violeta Hemsy de Gainza; Argentine pianist and composer	94	July 7, 2023	Buenos Aires, Argentina	Natural causes
Özkan Uğur; MFÖ	69	July 8, 2023	Istanbul, Turkey	Lymphoma
Luciano Rossi Roman singer-songwriter very active especially in the 70s	77	July 8, 2023	Rome, Italy	
Sam Cutler; Tour manager for the Rolling Stones and the Grateful Dead	80	July 11, 2023	Brisbane, Australia	Cancer
Jane Birkin; Actress and singer	76	July 16, 2023	Paris, France	Undisclosed
Tony Bennett; Singer	96	July 21, 2023	New York City, New York, United States	Alzheimer's disease
Patty Ryan; Eurodisco singer	62	July 23, 2023	Germany	Lung cancer
Otello Profazio Italian singer-songwriter and storyteller	88	July 23, 2023	Reggio Calabria, Italy	Suffering of heart problems for a long time
Brad Houser; Edie Brickell & New Bohemians, Critters Buggin	62	July 24, 2023	Austin, Texas, United States	Stroke
Biff Rose; Singer-songwriter	85	July 25, 2023	Madison, Wisconsin, United States	Undisclosed
Sinéad O'Connor; Singer-songwriter	56	July 26, 2023	London, England	COPD and bronchial asthma
Randy Meisner; Eagles, Poco, The Stone Canyon Band	77	July 26, 2023	Los Angeles, California, United States	COPD
John Gosling; The Kinks	75	August 3, 2023	Berkhamsted, Hertfordshire, England	Undisclosed causes
David LaFlamme; The Orkustra, It's A Beautiful Day	82	August 6, 2023	Santa Rosa, California, United States	Complications from Parkinson's disease
Erkin Koray; Turkish folk and rock musician	82	August 7, 2023	Toronto, Canada	Lung-related problems
DJ Casper; DJ and songwriter	58	August 7, 2023	Hazel Crest, Illinois, United States	Liver and kidney cancer
Robbie Robertson; The Band	80	August 9, 2023	Los Angeles, California, United States	Prostate cancer
Sixto Rodriguez; Singer-songwriter	81	August 9, 2023	Detroit, Michigan, United States	Undisclosed causes
Peppino Gagliardi Italian singer and multi-instrumentalist	83	August 9, 2023	Rome, Italy	Natural causes related to advancing age and a general decline in health conditions
Antonella Lualdi Italian singer and actress	92	August 10, 2023	Rome, Italy	Advanced age
Ron Peno; Died Pretty	68	August 11, 2023	Melbourne, Australia	Esophageal cancer
Clarence Avant; Music executive	92	August 13, 2023	Los Angeles, California, United States	Undisclosed
Jerry Moss; Record executive	88	August 16, 2023	Bel Air, California, United States	Natural causes
Renata Scotto Italian soprano and theatre director	89	August 16, 2023	New York, United States	
Walter Aipolani; Hawaiian singer-songwriter and guitarist	68	August 17, 2023	Hilo, Hawaii	Liver cancer
Bobby Eli; Songwriter and guitarist	77	August 17, 2023	Philadelphia, Pennsylvania, United States	Natural causes
Gary Young; Pavement	70	August 17, 2023	Stockton, California, United States	Undisclosed
Ray Hildebrand; Paul & Paula	82	August 18, 2023	Kansas City, Missouri, United States	Undisclosed
Václav Patejdl; Elán	68	August 19, 2023	Prague, Czech Republic	A short illness
Toto Cutugno; Italian singer-songwriter and musician	80	August 22, 2023	Milan, Italy	Prostate cancer
Vaccine; Dubstep producer and musician	43	August 22, 2023	California, United States	Undisclosed
Bernie Marsden; Whitesnake, UFO, Wild Turkey, Paice Ashton Lord	72	August 24, 2023	Buckingham, Buckinghamshire, England	Bacterial meningitis
John Kezdy; The Effigies	64	August 26, 2023	Evanston, Illinois, United States	Bicycle crash
Brian McBride; Stars of the Lid, Bell Gardens	53	August 27, 2023	Los Angeles, California, United States	Undisclosed
James Casey; Trey Anastasio Band	40	August 28, 2023	New York City, New York, United States	Colon cancer
Len Chandler; Folk singer	88	August 28, 2023	Los Angeles, California, United States	Stroke
Jack Sonni; Dire Straits	68	August 30, 2023	Taylor, Mississippi, United States	Undisclosed
Curtis Fowlkes; The Jazz Passengers	73	August 31, 2023	Brooklyn, New York, United States	Congestive heart failure
Giovanbattista Cutolo Italian musician, awarded the gold medal for civil valor	24	August 31, 2023	Naples, Italy	From a gunshot fired by a minor following an argument that broke out over trivial matters related to a badly parked scooter
Jimmy Buffett; Singer-songwriter	76	September 1, 2023	Sag Harbor, New York, United States	Merkel-cell skin cancer
Steve Harwell; Smash Mouth	56	September 4, 2023	Boise, Idaho, United States	Liver failure
Gary Wright; Spooky Tooth, Singer-songwriter	80	September 4, 2023	Palos Verdes Estates, California, United States	Parkinson's disease
Larry Chance; The Earls	82	September 5, 2023	Orlando, Florida, United States	Lung cancer
Charles Gayle; Jazz musician	84	September 5, 2023	Brooklyn, New York, United States	Undisclosed
Bruce Guthro; Runrig	62	September 5, 2023	Cape Breton Island (specifically in Halifax or his native region of Cape Breton, Nova Scotia, Canada	Cancer
Richard Davis; Bassist	93	September 6, 2023	Madison, Wisconsin, United States	Undisclosed
Mylon LeFevre; Christian rock singer	78	September 8, 2023	Newark, Texas, United States	Cancer
Brendan Croker; The Notting Hillbillies	70	September 10, 2023	Leeds, England	Leukemia
Charlie Robison; Country singer-songwriter	59	September 10, 2023	San Antonio, Texas, United States	Cardiac arrest
Matt Stewart; Streetlight Manifesto	41	September 10, 2023		Natural causes
Ivan Stortini (Pusha) Member of the Roman rap group Flaminio Maphia	50	September 11, 2023	Rome, Italy	
MohBad; Nigerian rapper	27	September 12, 2023	Lagos, Nigeria	Unknown see Death of MohBad
Roger Whittaker; Singer-songwriter	87	September 13, 2023	France	Stroke
Paul Woseen; The Screaming Jets	56	September 15, 2023	Australia	Undisclosed
Franco Migliacci Italian lyricist, record producer, and actor	92	September 15, 2023	Rome, Italy	Deteriorating general health due to his advanced age
Irish Grinstead; 702	43	September 16, 2023	Las Vegas, Nevada, United States	Undisclosed illness
John Marshall; Nucleus, Soft Machine	82	September 16, 2023	London, England	Undisclosed
Lou Deprijck; Singer and record producer	77	September 19, 2023	Brussels, Belgium	Undisclosed illness
Katherine Anderson; The Marvelettes	79	September 20, 2023	Dearborn, Michigan, United States	Heart failure
Kent Stax; Scream	61	September 20, 2023	Falls Church, Virginia, United States	Metastatic cancer
Terry Kirkman; The Association	83	September 23, 2023	Montclair, California, United States	Congestive heart failure
Frank Carpentieri Musician, DJ, and producer, he composed all the music for the comedy show "Made in Sud"	47	September 29, 2023	Naples, Italy	Cancer
Russell Batiste Jr. The Funky Meters, Vida Blue	57	September 30, 2023	LaPlace, Louisiana, United States	Heart attack
Ron Haffkine; Record producer	84	October 1, 2023	Mexico	Leukemia and kidney failure
Bruno Filippini Famous singer of the 60s (famous for songs such as Sabato sera and the soundtrack of Zeffirelli's movie (Romeo and Juliet)	78	October 5, 2023	Rome, Italy	
Shinji Tanimura; Japanese singer-songwriter	74	October 8, 2023	Tokyo, Japan	Enteritis
Buck Trent; Country music instrumentalist	85	October 9, 2023	Branson, Missouri, United States	Undisclosed
Rudolph Isley; The Isley Brothers	84	October 11, 2023	Chicago, Illinois, United States	Heart attack
Carla Bley; Jazz composer and pianist	87	October 17, 2023	Willow, New York ( a hamlet located within the town of Woodstock), United States	Brain cancer
Dwight Twilley; The Dwight Twilley Band	72	October 18, 2023	Tulsa, Oklahoma, United States	Stroke while driving
The 45 King; Hip-hop producer and DJ	62	October 19, 2023	East Orange, New Jersey, United States	Undisclosed
Lasse Berghagen; Swedish singer, songwriter and actor	78	October 19, 2023	Stockholm, Sweden	Complications following open heart surgery
Gregg Sutton; Singer-songwriter and musician	74	October 22, 2023	Los Angeles, California, United States	Undisclosed
Angelo Bruschini; Guitarist	62	October 23, 2023	Bristol, England	Lung cancer
Mervin Shiner; Country singer-songwriter	102	October 23, 2023	Tampa, Florida, United States	Undisclosed
Paul Harris; Keyboardist, Manassas, Souther–Hillman–Furay Band	78	October 24, 2023	Ft. Lauderdale, Florida, United States	Undisclosed
Steve Riley; W.A.S.P., L.A. Guns, Keel, Steppenwolf	67	October 24, 2023	Los Angeles, California, United States	Pneumonia
Goa Gil; Electronic music DJ	72	October 26, 2023	California, United States	B-cell lymphoma
Heath; X Japan	55	October 29, 2023	Japan	Colorectal cancer
Michael "Mick" Sherrard British musician, guitarist and lyricist	71	November 1, 2023	Manchester, England	
Sean Martin; The Night Café	26	November 6, 2023	Liverpool, England	Undisclosed
Johnny Ruffo; Singer and songwriter	35	November 10, 2023	Sydney, Australia	Brain cancer
Conny Van Dyke; Singer and actress	78	November 11, 2023	Los Angeles, California, United States	Vascular dementia
George Brown; Kool & the Gang	74	November 16, 2023	Long Beach, California, United States	Lung cancer
Charlie Dominici; Dream Theater	72	November 17, 2023	Brooklyn, New York, United States	Undisclosed
Catherine Christer Hennix; Swedish experimental musician	75	November 21, 2023	Istanbul, Turkey	Undisclosed
Mars Williams; The Psychedelic Furs, The Waitresses, Liquid Soul	68	November 20, 2023	Chicago, Illinois, United States	Ampullary cancer
Jean Knight; Soul singer	80	November 22, 2023	Tampa, Florida, United States	Undisclosed
Jim Salestrom; Singer-songwriter	67	November 22, 2023	Arvada, Colorado, United States	Cancer
Greg "Fingers" Taylor; Harmonica player most notably with Jimmy Buffett and the Coral Reefer Band	71	November 23, 2023	Whitfield, Mississippi, United States	Alzheimer's disease
Les Maguire; Gerry and the Pacemakers	81	November 25, 2023	Liverpool, England	A short illness
Geordie Walker; Killing Joke	64	November 26, 2023	Prague, Czechia	Stroke
Roby Matano Italian singer and musician famous for having been a member of the group I Campioni and for having been the first discoverer of Lucio Battisti, with whom he collaborated in writing many of his first song	92	November 28, 2023	Romano di Lombardo, Bergamo, Italy	
Shane MacGowan; The Pogues	65	November 30, 2023	Dublin, Ireland	Pneumonia and encephalitis
Myles Goodwyn; April Wine	75	December 3, 2023	Halifax, Nova Scotia, Canada	Diabetes
Denny Laine; Wings, The Moody Blues	79	December 5, 2023	Naples, Florida, United States	Lung disease
Adrian Morgan; The Cougars	80	December 7, 2023	Somerset, England	Undisclosed
Guido Celestino Egidio Crapanzano (Guidone) Italian singer and numismatist	85	December 10, 2023	Milan, Italy	
Jeffrey Foskett; The Beach Boys, Brian Wilson	67	December 11, 2023	United States	Thyroid cancer
Essra Mohawk; Singer-songwriter	75	December 11, 2023	Nashville, Tennessee, United States	Cancer
Zahara; Singer-songwriter	36	December 11, 2023	Johannesburg, Gauteng, South Africa	Liver complications
Colin Burgess; AC/DC, The Masters Apprentices	77	December 16, 2023	Sydney, Australia	Undisclosed
Amp Fiddler; Singer-songwriter, keyboardist, and record producer	65	December 17, 2023	Detroit, Michigan, United States	Cancer
Jim Ladd; Free-form rock music disc jockey, radio producer, writer	75	December 17, 2023	Carmichael, California, United States	Heart attack
Susanna Parigi Italian singer-songwriter, musician and composer	62	December 17, 2023	Milan, Italy	
Eric Moyo; Zimbabwean gospel singer	42	December 20, 2023	South Africa	Brain bleed; collapsed onstage
R. Scott Bryan; Drummer for Sheryl Crow and The Allman Betts Band	69	December 22, 2023	St. Louis, Missouri, United States	Cancer
Laura Lynch; Dixie Chicks	65	December 22, 2023	El Paso, Texas, United States	Car crash
Lisandro Meza; Colombian singer and accordionist	86	December 23, 2023	Sincelejo, Colombia	Stroke
Willie Ruff; Jazz musician and educator	92	December 24, 2023	Killen, Alabama, United States	Undisclosed
David Freeman; Preservationist of bluegrass and old-time music	84	December 25, 2023	Chapel Hill, North Carolina, United States	Alzheimer's disease
Rudy Flores; Los Humildes	75	December 26, 2023	Houston, Texas, United States	Undisclosed
Tom Smothers; Comedian and musician	86	December 26, 2023	Santa Rosa, California, United States	Lung cancer
Mbongeni Ngema; South African musician and playwright	68	December 27, 2023	South Africa	Car crash
Maurice Hines; Dancer, singer and actor	80	December 29, 2023	Englewood, New Jersey, United States	Natural causes
Les McCann; Jazz pianist and vocalist	88	December 29, 2023	California, United States	Undisclosed
Sandra Reaves-Phillips; Actress and singer	79	December 29, 2023	Queens, New York, United States	Undisclosed
Klee Benally; Blackfire	48	December 30, 2023	Phoenix, Arizona, United States	Undisclosed

== See also ==
- List of deaths in popular music
- List of murdered hip hop musicians
- 27 Club
