= Bonaroo =

Bonnaroo, or Bon-a-roo, is a New Orleans French Creole slang phrase meaning “best on the street". The term may refer to:

- Bonnaroo Music Festival, an annual music festival held in Manchester, Tennessee, U.S.
- Desitively Bonnaroo, a 1974 album by Dr. John
- Bonaroo (band), a 1970s American pop rock band
  - Bonaroo, a 1975 album by the band; see Bobby Winkelman
- Bonaroo II, an album by Bobby Winkelman
