= List of 2024 deaths in popular music =

This is a list of notable performers of rock music and other forms of popular music, and others directly associated with the music as producers, songwriters, or in other closely related roles, who died in 2024.

== 2024 deaths in popular music ==
| Preceded by 2023 | List of deaths in popular music 2024 | Succeeded by 2025 |

| Name | Age | Date | Location of death | Cause of death |
|---|---|---|---|---|
| Chris Karrer; Amon Düül, Amon Düül II, Embryo | 76 | January 2, 2024 | Bavaria, Germany | COVID-19 |
| Glynis Johns; Actress and singer | 100 | January 4, 2024 | Los Angeles, California, United States | Natural causes |
| David Soul; Actor and singer | 80 | January 4, 2024 | London, England | COPD |
| Larry Collins; Country guitarist and singer-songwriter | 79 | January 5, 2024 | Santa Clarita, California, United States | Natural causes |
| Gene Deer; Blues guitarist and singer | 59 | January 5, 2024 | Fairland, Indiana, United States | Unknown |
| Del Palmer; Bass guitarist and audio engineer | 71 | January 5, 2024 | United Kingdom | Undisclosed |
| Iasos; New-age musician | 76 | January 6, 2024 | Maui, Hawaii | Undisclosed |
| Tony Clarkin; Magnum | 77 | January 7, 2024 | Birmingham, England | Spinal condition |
| Germana Caroli Italian singer | 92 | January 7, 2024 | Monghidoro, Bologna, Italy | |
| Phill Niblock; Avant-garde composer and filmmaker | 90 | January 8, 2024 | Manhattan, New York City, New York, United States | Heart failure |
| Gian Franco Reverberi Italian composer, brother of Gian Piero Reverberi and exponent of the Genoese School | 89 | January 8, 2024 | Genoa, Italy | Natural decline due to advanced age |
| James Kottak; Scorpions, Kingdom Come, Warrant | 61 | January 9, 2024 | Louisville, Kentucky, United States | Cardiac arrest |
| Audie Blaylock; Bluegrass musician | 61 | January 10, 2024 | Auburn, Indiana, United States | Undisclosed |
| Bill Hayes; Actor and singer | 98 | January 12, 2024 | Los Angeles, California, United States | Undisclosed |
| Jo-El Sonnier; Country and Cajun singer-songwriter and musician | 77 | January 13, 2024 | Austin, Texas, United States | Heart attack |
| Ari Taskinen; Finnish musician, composer, and lyricist | 64 | January 15, 2024 | Dahab, Egypt | Undisclosed illness |
| Dana Ghia Italian actress and singer, active between the late 1950s and the 1970s | 91 | January 16, 2024 | Mori, Trento, Italy | |
| Peter Schickele; Composer and musical parodist (P. D. Q. Bach) | 88 | January 16, 2024 | Bearsville, New York, United States | Undisclosed |
| Giorgio Bennato (Giorgio Zito) Italian singer-songwriter, guitarist and record producer | 74 | January 16, 2024 | Naples, Italy | Heart attack |
| Nello Ciangherotti Italian conductor, composer and arranger | 93 | January 17, 2024 | Muggia, Italy | |
| Silent Servant (Juan Mendez); Techno musician, DJ, producer | 46 | January 18, 2024 | Los Angeles, California, United States | Fentanyl overdose |
| The Soft Moon (Luis Vasquez); Techno musician, singer-songwriter, producer | 44 | January 18, 2024 | Los Angeles, California, United States | Fentanyl overdose |
| Marlena Shaw; Jazz and soul singer | 84 | January 19, 2024 | Las Vegas, Nevada, United States | Undisclosed |
| Mary Weiss; The Shangri-Las | 75 | January 19, 2024 | Palm Springs, California, United States | COPD |
| Frank Farian; Singer and record producer | 82 | January 23, 2024 | Miami, Florida, United States | Undisclosed |
| Melanie; Singer-songwriter | 76 | January 23, 2024 | Nashville, Tennessee, United States | Undisclosed |
| Anders "Dagger" Sandberg; Rednex | 55 | January 23, 2024 | Hedemora, Sweden | Undisclosed |
| Margo Smith; Country singer-songwriter | 84 | January 23, 2024 | Franklin, Tennessee, United States | Stroke |
| Bhavatharini; Indian singer | 47 | January 25, 2024 | Sri Lanka | Stomach cancer |
| Dean Brown; Jazz guitarist | 68 | January 26, 2024 | Los Angeles, California, United States | Cancer |
| Tony Cedras; South African multi-instrumentalist | 72 | January 29, 2024 | Cape Town, South Africa | Emphysema |
| Franco Tozzi Italian singer, brother of Umberto Tozzi | 79 | January 29, 2024 | Cuneo, Italy | |
| Chita Rivera; Actress, singer, and dancer | 91 | January 30, 2024 | New York City, New York, United States | A brief illness |
| Paul Brett; Rock guitarist | 76 | January 31, 2024 | North Wales | Heart failure |
| Hank Cicalo; Recording engineer | 91 | January 31, 2024 | Los Angeles, California, United States | Undisclosed |
| Wayne Kramer; MC5 | 75 | February 2, 2024 | Los Angeles, California, United States | Pancreatic cancer |
| Derrick McIntyre; Jamiroquai | 66 | February 2, 2024 | Hertfordshire, England | Car crash |
| Aston "Family Man" Barrett; Bob Marley and the Wailers | 77 | February 3, 2024 | Miami, Florida, United States | Heart failure after a series of strokes |
| Toby Keith; Country singer-songwriter | 62 | February 5, 2024 | Oklahoma City, Oklahoma, United States | Stomach cancer |
| Donald Kinsey; Bob Marley and the Wailers | 70 | February 6, 2024 | Merrillville, Indiana, United States | Undisclosed |
| Henry Fambrough; The Spinners | 85 | February 7, 2024 | Sterling, Virginia, United States | Natural causes |
| Mojo Nixon; Musician, actor, and DJ | 66 | February 7, 2024 | On a cruise ship near San Juan, Puerto Rico | Cardiac arrest |
| Damo Suzuki; Can | 74 | February 9, 2024 | Cologne, Germany | Colon cancer |
| Jimmy Van Eaton; Rock and roll drummer | 86 | February 9, 2024 | Alabama, United States | Undisclosed |
| Randy Sparks; The New Christy Minstrels, The Back Porch Majority | 90 | February 11, 2024 | San Diego, California, United States | Undisclosed |
| Kerry "Fatman" Hunter; New Orleans Nightcrawlers | 53 | February 13, 2024 | New Orleans, Louisiana, United states | Hit by a car |
| Ian Amey; Dave Dee, Dozy, Beaky, Mick & Tich | 79 | February 14, 2024 | Salisbury, Wiltshire, England | Undisclosed |
| Etterlene DeBarge; Gospel singer | 88 | February 16, 2024 | Woodland Hills, California, United States | Undisclosed |
| Dexter Romweber; Flat Duo Jets | 57 | February 16, 2024 | Carrboro, North Carolina, United States | Natural causes |
| Cynthia Strother; The Bell Sisters | 88 | February 16, 2024 | Las Vegas, Nevada, United States | Heart failure |
| Geoffrey Michaels; Violinst | 79 | February 17, 2024 | Voorhees Township, New Jersey, United States | Parkinson's disease |
| Vitalij Kuprij; Trans-Siberian Orchestra | 49 | February 20, 2024 | Shillington, Pennsylvania, United States | Cardiac arrest |
| John Lowe; Pianist for The Quarrymen | 81 | February 22, 2024 | Liverpool , in the West Derby district, England | Undisclosed causes |
| Roni Stoneman; Bluegrass banjo player | 85 | February 22, 2024 | Nashville, Tennessee, United States | Undisclosed |
| Shinsadong Tiger; K-pop producer and songwriter | 40 | February 23, 2024 | Seoul, Korea | Unknown |
| Peter "Peetah" Morgan; Morgan Heritage | 46 | February 25, 2024 | United States | Stroke |
| Bob Heil; Sound and radio engineer | 83 | February 28, 2024 | Belleville, Illinois, United States | Cancer |
| Cat Janice; Singer-songwriter | 31 | February 28, 2024 | Annandale, Virginia, United States | Sarcoma |
| Don Lee Van Winkle; The American Dream | 75 | February 28, 2024 | Philadelphia, Pennsylvania, United States | Liver cancer |
| Jimmy Maxwell; Bandleader and conductor | 70 | February 29, 2024 | New Orleans, Louisiana, United States | Undisclosed |
| Don Wise; R&B saxophonist | 81 | March 1, 2024 | Knoxville, Tennessee, United States | Undisclosed causes |
| Jim Beard; Steely Dan | 63 | March 2, 2024 | New York, New York, United States | A sudden illness |
| W. C. Clark; Blues musician | 84 | March 2, 2024 | Austin, Texas, United States | Cancer |
| Eleanor Collins; Jazz singer | 104 | March 3, 2024 | Surrey, British Columbia, Canada | Undisclosed |
| Brit Turner; Blackberry Smoke | 57 | March 3, 2024 | Atlanta, Georgia, United States | Glioblastoma |
| B. B. Seaton; The Gaylads | 79 | March 4, 2024 | London, England | Undisclosed |
| Debra Byrd; Singer and vocal coach | 72 | March 5, 2024 | Los Angeles, California, United States | Undisclosed |
| Pavel Zajíček; DG 307 | 72 | March 5, 2024 | Prague, Czechia | Pneumonia |
| Steve Lawrence; Singer, comedian, and actor | 88 | March 7, 2024 | Los Angeles, California, United States | Alzheimer's disease |
| Ernie Fields Jr. Jazz saxophonist | 90 | March 8, 2024 | Pasadena, California, United States | Undisclosed |
| Malcolm Holcombe; Folk musician | 68 | March 9, 2024 | Asheville, North Carolina, United States | Respiratory failure stemming from cancer |
| Clem Sacco Italian singer-songwriter | 90 | March 9, 2024 | Tenerife, Spain | Natural causes associated with old age |
| Eric Carmen; Raspberries | 74 | March 10, 2024 | Gates Mills, Ohio, United States | Undisclosed |
| Blake Harrison; Pig Destroyer | 48 | March 10, 2024 | Baltimore, Maryland, United States | Melanoma |
| Paul Nelson; Rock and blues guitarist | 63 | March 10, 2024 | Florida, United States | Heart attack |
| T. M. Stevens; Bass guitarist | 72 | March 10, 2024 | Englewood, New Jersey, United States | Dementia |
| Karl Wallinger; The Waterboys, World Party | 66 | March 10, 2024 | Hastings, England | Stroke |
| Leonardo Marino Italian singer and theatre actor | 78 | March 10, 2024 | Catania, Italy | Long illness |
| Roberto Coviello Italian baritone whose career spanned the period from 1980 to 1993, the year in which he abandoned the stage to dedicate himself exclusively to teaching singing | 68 | March 10, 2024 | Milan, Italy | |
| Pete Rodriguez; Pianist and bandleader | 91 | March 11, 2024 | Los Angeles, California, United States | Undisclosed |
| Boss (Lichelle Laws); Rapper | 54 | March 11, 2024 | Southfield, Michigan, United States | Kidney failure |
| Michael Knott; Christian rock musician | 61 | March 12, 2024 | Carlsbad, California, United States | Undisclosed |
| Jordan Jeffrey Baby Italian rapper | 26 | March 12, 2024 | Pavia, Italy | Suicide by hanging |
| Russell Wilson; Junkhouse | 62 | March 12, 2024 | Hamilton, Ontario, Canada | Meningitis |
| Dick Allix; Drummer for Vanity Fare | 78 | March 13, 2024 | England | Undisclosed causes |
| Angela McCluskey; Wild Colonials | 64 | March 14, 2024 | Los Angeles, California, United States | Arterial tear |
| Gintaras Zdebskis; Lithuanian radio station manager | 64 | March 17, 2024 | Lithuania | Undisclosed |
| Cola Boyy; Singer-songwriter and multi-instrumentalist | 34 | March 17, 2024 | Oxnard, California, United States | Undisclosed |
| Sandra Crouch; Gospel singer and percussionist | 81 | March 17, 2024 | Northridge, California, United States | Complications from radiation treatment |
| Steve Harley; Cockney Rebel | 73 | March 17, 2024 | Suffolk, England | Cancer |
| Kevin Toney; The Blackbyrds | 70 | March 18, 2024 | Hollywood Hills, Los Angeles County, California, United States | Cancer |
| Greg Lee; Hepcat | 53 | March 19, 2024 | Paramount, California, United States | Brain aneurysm |
| Gene Elders; Ace in the Hole Band | 80 | March 20, 2024 | Texas, United States | Undisclosed |
| Cocky Mazzetti Italian singer | 87 | March 20, 2024 | Milan, Italy | |
| Maurizio Pollini Musician | 82 | March 23, 2024 | Milan, Italy | Heart complications |
| Vincent Bonham; Raydio | 67 | March 24, 2024 | Westland, Michigan, United States | No cause given |
| Chris Cross; Ultravox | 71 | March 25, 2024 | London, England | Undisclosed |
| Zero (Clare Elliott); Suburban Reptiles | 67 | March 26, 2024 | Auckland, New Zealand | Undisclosed |
| Gerry Conway; Jethro Tull, Fairport Convention | 76 | March 29, 2024 | Norfolk, England | Motor neurone disease |
| Casey Benjamin; Saxophonist, producer, and songwriter | 45 | March 30, 2024 | Maryland, United States | Pulmonary thromboembolism |
| Michael Ward; The Wallflowers, School of Fish | 57 | April 1, 2024 | Los Angeles, California, United States | Complications from diabetes |
| Françoise Hardy | 80 | April 1, 2024 | Paris, France | |
| Jerry Abbott; Songwriter and record producer | 81 | April 2, 2024 | Denton, Texas, United States | Undisclosed |
| Albert Heath; Heath Brothers | 88 | April 3, 2024 | Santa Fe, New Mexico, United States | Leukemia |
| Keith LeBlanc; Drummer and record producer | 69 | April 4, 2024 | United States | Undisclosed |
| Rocket Norton; Prism | 73 | April 5, 2024 | Vancouver, Canada | Cancer |
| Phil Nimmons; Jazz musician, composer, and educator | 100 | April 5, 2024 | Thornhill, Ontario, Canada | Undisclosed |
| C. J. Snare; FireHouse | 64 | April 5, 2024 | Charlotte, North Carolina, United States | Colon cancer, cardiac arrest |
| Dutty Dior; Norwegian rapper | 27 | April 6, 2024 | Oslo, Norway | Astma Atack |
| Clarence "Frogman" Henry; Rhythm and blues singer and pianist | 87 | April 7, 2024 | New Orleans, Louisiana, United States | Complications following back surgery |
| Gianni Meccia Italian singer-songwriter and lyricist | 92 | April 9, 2024 | Ferrara, Italy | |
| Mister Cee; Hip-hop DJ and producer | 57 | April 10, 2024 | New York City, New York, United States | Diabetes-related coronary artery and kidney disease |
| Park Bo-ram; South Korean singer | 30 | April 11, 2024 | Seoul, Korea | Acute alcohol poisoning |
| Giorgio Azzolini Italian double bass player and composer | 96 | April 12, 2024 | Milan, Italy | |
| Ben Eldridge; The Seldom Scene | 85 | April 14, 2024 | Fredericksburg, Virginia, United States | Undisclosed |
| Calvin Keys; Jazz guitarist | 82 | April 14, 2024 | Berkeley, California, United States | Stroke |
| Reita; The Gazette | 42 | April 15, 2024 | Japan | Undisclosed |
| Arthur Tavares; Tavares | 81 | April 15, 2024 | Wareham, Massachusetts, United States | Undisclosed |
| Clorofila (Jorge Verdín); Nortec Collective | 59 | April 16, 2024 | Pasadena, California, United States | Undisclosed |
| Rusty Gauthier; New Riders of the Purple Sage | 73 | April 16, 2024 | Petaluma, California, United States | A protracted lung illness |
| Dickey Betts; The Allman Brothers Band | 80 | April 18, 2024 | Osprey, Florida, United States | Cancer and COPD |
| Jack Green; T. Rex, Pretty Things, Rainbow | 73 | April 18, 2024 | Ryde on the Isle of Wight, England | Cancer |
| Mandisa; Gospel singer | 47 | April 18, 2024 | Nashville, Tennessee, United States | Complications of class III obesity |
| Eddie Sutton; Lead singer/Frontman of Leeway | 59 | April 19, 2024 | New York, United States | Lung cancer |
| MC Duke; Rapper | 58 | April 21, 2024 | United Kingdom | Undisclosed |
| Samuel Kummer; Organist and academic | 56 | April 23, 2024 | Dresden, Saxony, Germany | Collapsed/Undisclosed causes |
| Mike Pinder; The Moody Blues | 82 | April 24, 2024 | Sacramento, California, United States | Unspecified breathing issues |
| Nick Daniels III; Dumpstaphunk | 68 | April 26, 2024 | New Orleans, Louisiana, United States | Multiple myeloma |
| Robin George; Rock guitarist | 68 | April 26, 2024 | Málaga, Spain | Undisclosed |
| Frank Wakefield; Bluegrass mandolin player | 89 | April 26, 2024 | Saratoga Springs, New York, United States | COPD |
| Louiselle Italian singer, popular in the sixties and seventies | 77 | April 27, 2024 | Rome, Italy | |
| Duane Eddy; Rock and roll guitarist | 86 | April 30, 2024 | Franklin, Tennessee, United States | Cancer |
| Richard Tandy; Electric Light Orchestra | 76 | May 1, 2024 | Albany, New York, United States | Undisclosed |
| Jim Mills; Bluegrass banjo player | 57 | May 3, 2024 | Durham, North Carolina, United States | Heart attack |
| Michele Paradiso Italian composer | 79 | May 4, 2024 | Rome, Italy | |
| Steve Albini; Rock musician and record producer | 61 | May 7, 2024 | Chicago, Illinois, United States | Heart attack |
| Ignatius Jones; Jimmy and the Boys | 67 | May 7, 2024 | Iloilo City, Philippines | A short illness |
| John Barbata; Drummer for The Turtles, Crosby, Stills, Nash & Young, Jefferson Airplane, Jefferson Starship | 79 | May 8, 2024 | Ada, Oklahoma, United States | Complications of heart disease |
| Dennis Thompson; MC5 | 75 | May 8, 2024 | Taylor, Michigan, United States | Complications from a heart attack |
| Giovanna Marini Italian singer-songwriter, ethnomusical researcher and folklorist | 87 | May 8, 2024 | Rome, Italy | |
| Mike Sversvold; JFA | 57 | May 11, 2024 | Phoenix, Arizona, United States | Autoimmune disease |
| Tito Gotti Italian conductor, musicologist, essayist and musical organizer | 97 | May 11, 2024 | Bologna, Italy | |
| David Sanborn; Saxophonist | 78 | May 12, 2024 | Tarrytown, New York, United States | Prostate cancer |
| Enrico Musiani Italian singer | 86 | May 13, 2024 | Pavia, Italy | |
| Jimmy James; Singer | 83 | May 14, 2024 | London, England | Parkinson's disease and a heart condition |
| John Hawken; Renaissance, Strawbs | 84 | May 15, 2024 | Metuchen, New Jersey, United States | Melanoma |
| Randy Fuller; The Bobby Fuller Four | 80 | May 16, 2024 | United States | Undisclosed |
| Charlie Colin; Train, The Side Deal | 57 | May 17, 2024 | Brussels, Belgium | Slipped and fell in the shower |
| Frank Ifield; Country singer and musician | 86 | May 18, 2024 | Sydney, Australia | Pneumonia |
| "Spider" John Koerner; Folk and blues singer-songwriter and guitarist | 85 | May 18, 2024 | Minneapolis, Minnesota, United States | Cancer |
| Jon Wysocki; Staind; Soil | 53 | May 18, 2024 | Nashville, Tennessee, United States | Undisclosed |
| Franchino Italian disc jockey | 71 | May 19, 2024 | Milan, Italy | |
| Mark Gormley; Singer-songwriter and musician | 67 | May 24, 2024 | Pensacola, Florida, United States | Undisclosed |
| Doug Ingle; Iron Butterfly | 78 | May 24, 2024 | San Diego, California, United States | Undisclosed |
| Richard M. Sherman American composer and lyricist of film and musical score | 95 | May 25, 2024 | Los Angeles, California, United States | |
| Ghigo Agosti Italian singer, composer and musician | 88 | May 27, 2024 | Castana, Italy | |
| Cayouche (Réginald Charles Gagnon); Acadian country singer-songwriter and guitarist | 75 | May 29, 2024 | Maisonnette, New Brunswick, Canada | Medically assisted suicide following cancer diagnosis |
| Doug Dagger; The Generators | 56 | May 30, 2024 | Los Angeles, California, United States | Cancer |
| Ed Mann; Keyboardist and percussionist | 69 | May 31, 2024 | Great Barrington, Massachusetts, England | Undisclosed |
| Maria Di Pasquale Italian pianist and harpsichordist | 60 | May 31, 2024 | Rome, Italy | |
| Bruno Incagnoli Italian oboist | 88 | May 31, 2024 | Rome, Italy | |
| Colin Gibb; Black Lace | 70 | June 2, 2024 | United Kingdom | Undisclosed |
| Brother Marquis; 2 Live Crew | 57 | June 3, 2024 | Gadsden, Alabama, United States | Heart attack |
| Rosalina Neri Italian actress and opera singer | 96 | June 5, 2024 | Milan, Italy | |
| Enchanting; Rapper | 26 | June 11, 2024 | Dallas, Texas, United States | Drug overdose |
| Françoise Hardy; Singer-songwriter and actress | 80 | June 11, 2024 | Paris, France | Lymphatic cancer |
| Arthur "Gaps" Hendrickson; The Selecter | 73 | June 11, 2024 | Coventry, England | Undisclosed |
| Michailas Jablonskis; Lithuanian Pop singer | 76 | June 12, 2024 | Lithuania | Unknown |
| Johnny Canales; Tejano singer and TV host | 81 | June 12, 2024 | Corpus Christi, Texas, United States | Undisclosed |
| Angela Bofill; Singer-songwriter | 70 | June 13, 2024 | Vallejo, California, United States | Undisclosed |
| Jeremy Tepper; Country singer, DJ, and producer | 60 | June 14, 2024 | Queens, New York, United States | Heart attack |
| Buzz Cason; Singer and songwriter | 84 | June 16, 2024 | Franklin, Tennessee, United States | Undisclosed |
| Paul Spencer; Dario G | 53 | June 17, 2024 | Crewe, Cheshire, United Kingdom | Rectal cancer |
| James Chance; James Chance and the Contortions | 71 | June 18, 2024 | New York City, New York, United States | Undisclosed |
| Matt Watts; Zita Swoon, I H8 Camera | 36 | June 18, 2024 | Brussels, Belgium | Undisclosed |
| Alessandra Valeri Manera Italian lyricist, television author and television producer | 67 | June 18, 2024 | Milan, Italy | |
| Julio Foolio; Rapper | 26 | June 23, 2024 | Tampa, Florida, United States | Shot |
| Shifty Shellshock; Crazy Town | 49 | June 24, 2024 | Los Angeles, California, United States | Drug overdose |
| Kinky Friedman; Country singer-songwriter | 79 | June 26, 2024 | Medina, Texas, United States | Parkinson's disease |
| Martin Mull; Actor and musician | 80 | June 27, 2024 | Los Angeles, California, United States | Undisclosed |
| Paolo Di Cioccio Italian oboist and composer | 61 | June 27, 2024 | Rome, Italy | |
| Betty Veldpaus; Pussycat | 72 | June 28, 2024 | Netherlands | Undisclosed |
| Lando Bartolini Italian tenor | 87 | June 28, 2024 | Pistoia, Italy | |
| Tom Fowler; The Mothers of Invention, It's a Beautiful Day | 73 | July 2, 2024 | United States | Undisclosed |
| Maria Rita Viaggi Italian television announcer and singer-songwriter, active for Rai from 1979 to 2003 | 69 | July 3, 2024 | Grosseto, Italy | Sudden illness (cardiocirculatory arrest) |
| Tonj Acquaviva Italian composer, singer-songwriter and arranger | 61 | July 5, 2024 | Montpellier, France | |
| Joe Egan; Stealers Wheel | 77 | July 6, 2024 | Paisley, Renfrewshire, Scotland | Stroke |
| Pino D'Angiò Italian singer-songwriter | 71 | July 6, 2024 | Formello, Lazio, Italy | Long and complex series of serious health problems |
| Adrián Olivares; Menudo | 48 | July 8, 2024 | Miami, Florida, United States | Crohn's disease and ulcerative colitis |
| Joe Bonsall; The Oak Ridge Boys | 76 | July 9, 2024 | Hendersonville, Tennessee, United States | Complications of ALS |
| Dave Loggins; Singer-songwriter | 76 | July 10, 2024 | Nashville, Tennessee, United States | Undisclosed |
| J. Saul Kane; DJ, musician and producer | 57 | July 12, 2024 | London, England | Complications of diabetes and multiple sclerosis |
| Tomcraft; DJ and record producer | 49 | July 15, 2024 | Munich, Germany | Undisclosed |
| Bernice Johnson Reagon; The Freedom Singers, Sweet Honey in the Rock | 81 | July 16, 2024 | District of Columbia, United States | Undisclosed |
| Pinche Peach; Brujeria | 57 | July 17, 2024 | United States | Heart failure |
| Giancarlo Guardabassi Italian disc jockey, singer and lyricist | 87 | July 17, 2024 | Francavilla d'Ete, Fermo, Italy | |
| Happy Traum; Folk musician | 86 | July 17, 2024 | Manhattan, New York, United States | Pancreatic cancer |
| Toumani Diabaté; Kora player | 58 | July 19, 2024 | Bamako, Mali | A brief illness(Kidney Failure) |
| Jerry Miller; Moby Grape | 81 | July 20, 2024 | Tacoma, Washington, United States | Undisclosed |
| Sandy Posey; Country singer | 80 | July 20, 2024 | Lebanon, Tennessee, United States | Complications from dementia |
| Evelyn Thomas; Disco singer | 70 | July 21, 2024 | Port Charlotte, Florida, United States | Undisclosed |
| Kim Min-ki South Korean singer, composer, playwrighter | 73 | July 21, 2024 | Seoul, South Korea | stomach cancer |
| Duke Fakir; Four Tops | 88 | July 22, 2024 | Detroit, Michigan, United States | Heart failure |
| John Mayall; John Mayall & the Bluesbreakers | 90 | July 22, 2024 | California, United States | Undisclosed |
| Jason Clark; The Nelons | 50 | July 26, 2024 | Gillette, Wyoming, United States | Plane crash |
| Kelly Nelon Clark; The Nelons | 64 | July 26, 2024 | Gillette, Wyoming, United States | Plane crash |
| Amber Nelon Kistler; The Nelons | 35 | July 26, 2024 | Gillette, Wyoming, United States | Plane crash |
| Danny Clarke; The Meditations | 72 | July 27, 2024 | Clarendon parish, Jamaica | Undisclosed |
| Pat Collier; The Vibrators | 72 | July 27, 2024 | England, United Kingdom | Undisclosed |
| DJ Polo; Juice Crew | 63 | July 27, 2024 | Atlanta, Georgia area, United States | Undisclosed |
| Chino XL; Rapper | 50 | July 28, 2024 | New York, United States | Suicide by hanging |
| Martin Phillipps; The Chills | 61 | July 28, 2024 | Dunedin, New Zealand | Undisclosed |
| Mick Underwood; The Outlaws, The Herd, Episode Six, Quatermass, Gillan | 78 | July 28, 2024 | London, England | Alzheimer's and vascular dementia |
| Joey Gilmore; Guitarist for James Brown, Etta James, Bobby Bland, Little Milton, and Little Johnny Taylor | 80 | July 29, 2024 | Florida, United States | Undisclosed |
| DJ Randall; DJ and record producer | 54 | July 31, 2024 | East London, England | Undisclosed |
| Nicu Covaci; Transsylvania Phoenix | 77 | August 2, 2024 | Timișoara, Romania | Undisclosed |
| Massimo Cotto Italian journalist, disc jockey and writer | 62 | August 2, 2024 | Asti, Italy | |
| Shaun Martin; Snarky Puppy | 45 | August 3, 2024 | Dallas, Texas, United States | Stroke |
| Maurice Williams; The Zodiacs | 86 | August 5, 2024 | Charlotte, North Carolina, United States | Undisclosed |
| Mike Grape; Vocalist for Kala | 43 | August 6, 2024 | Philippines | Undisclosed |
| Jack Russell; Great White | 63 | August 7, 2024 | Southern California, United States | Lewy body dementia and multiple system atrophy |
| Fausto Pinna Italian music producer | 74 | August 8, 2024 | Lesmo, Brianza, Italy | Lung cancer |
| Carl Bevan; 60 Ft. Dolls | 51 | August 9, 2024 | Cardiff, Wales | Undisclosed |
| Carl Weathersby; Guitarist for Albert King, Billy Branch | 71 | August 9, 2024 | Austin, Texas, United States | Undisclosed |
| Celestina Casapietra Italian soprano | 84 | August 10, 2024 | Sori, Genoa, Italy | |
| Gökçe Akçelik; Replikas | 47 | August 11, 2024 | Turkey | Cancer |
| Haniya Aslam; Pop and Sufi musician | 46 | August 11, 2024 | Islamabad, Pakistan | Cardiac arrest |
| Talos; Indie electronic musician | 36 | August 11, 2024 | Cork, Ireland | A short illness |
| Chon Travis; Love Equals Death | 52 | August 11, 2024 | Stafford, England | Undisclosed |
| Greg Kihn; The Greg Kihn Band | 75 | August 13, 2024 | San Francisco Bay Area, United States | Complications from Alzheimer's disease |
| BeatKing; Rapper and record producer | 39 | August 15, 2024 | Houston, Texas, United States | Pulmonary embolism |
| Joe Chambers; The Chambers Brothers | 81 | August 15, 2024 | Los Angeles, California, United States | Undisclosed |
| Bobby Hicks; Bluegrass fiddler | 91 | August 16, 2024 | Marshall, North Carolina, United States | Complications of heart disease |
| Luther Kent; Blues singer | 76 | August 16, 2024 | Denham Springs, Louisiana, United States | Undisclosed |
| Johnny "Dandy" Rodríguez; Bongo player for Tito Puente | 78 | August 17, 2024 | Las Vegas, Nevada, United States | Undisclosed |
| Bert Susanka; The Ziggens | 62 | August 17, 2024 | Corona, Riverside County, California, United States | ALS |
| Erik Barrett; 100 Demons | 48 | August 19, 2024 | Newtown, Connecticut, United States | Undisclosed |
| Diana; Pop singer | 76 | August 21, 2024 | Araruama, Brazil | Undisclosed |
| Russell Stone; Brotherhood of Man, R&J Stone, James Last Orchestra | 77 | August 21, 2024 | United Kingdom | Undisclosed |
| Justin Chearno; Pitchblende, Turing Machine | 54 | August 22, 2024 | Brooklyn, New York, United States | Undisclosed |
| Daron Beck; Pinkish Black | 48 | August 22, 2024 | Haltom City, Texas, United States | Undisclosed |
| Umberto Marcato Italian singer | 94 | August 22, 2024 | Padua, Italy | |
| Russell Malone; Jazz guitarist | 60 | August 23, 2024 | Tokyo, Japan | Heart attack |
| Catherine Ribeiro; Folk and Rock singer | 82 | August 23, 2024 | Martigues, France | Undisclosed |
| Martynas Lidžius; Lithuanian singer and songwriter | 21 | August 26, 2024 | Lithuania | Unknown, possibly suicide |
| Richard Macphail; Road manager for Genesis | 73 | August 26, 2024 | London, England | Undisclosed |
| Makaya Ntshoko; Jazz drummer | 84 | August 27, 2024 | Basel, Switzerland | Undisclosed |
| Rena Rolska; Actress and singer | 92 | August 27, 2024 | Warsaw, Poland | Undisclosed |
| Pete Wade; Nashville session guitarist | 89 | August 27, 2024 | Hendersonville, Tennessee, United States | Complications from hip surgery |
| Elena Mauti Nunziata Italian opera singer | 79 | August 28, 2024 | Monaco | |
| Fatman Scoop; Rapper and hype man | 56 | August 30, 2024 | Hamden, Connecticut, United States | Cardiovascular disease – collapsed on stage |
| Teresa Bright; Musician of native Hawaiian music | 64 | September 1, 2024 | Honolulu, Hawaii | Undisclosed |
| James Darren; Actor and singer | 88 | September 2, 2024 | Los Angeles, California, United States | Heart failure |
| Pat Lewis; Soul singer | 76 | September 2, 2024 | Detroit, Michigan, United States | Undisclosed |
| Göran Fristorp; Singer and songwriter | 76 | September 3, 2024 | Hammenhög, Sweden | Undisclosed |
| Bora Đorđević; Riblja Čorba | 72 | September 4, 2024 | Ljubljana, Slovenia | Pneumonia |
| Herbie Flowers; Blue Mink, T. Rex, Sky | 86 | September 5, 2024 | Ditchling, East Sussex, England | Undisclosed |
| Martin France; Jazz drummer | 60 | September 5, 2024 | Rainhman, Kent, England | A long illness |
| Sérgio Mendes; Bossa nova musician | 83 | September 5, 2024 | Los Angeles, California, United States | Complications from long COVID |
| Rich Homie Quan; Rapper | 33 | September 5, 2024 | Atlanta, Georgia, United States | Drug overdose |
| Screamin' Scott Simon; Sha Na Na | 75 | September 5, 2024 | Ojai, California, United States | Sinus cancer |
| Will Jennings; Lyricist | 80 | September 6, 2024 | Tyler, Texas, United States | Undisclosed |
| Mark Moffatt; The Monitors | 74 | September 6, 2024 | Nashville, Tennessee, United States | Pancreatic cancer |
| Zoot Money; Zoot Money's Big Roll Band, The Animals, Humble Pie | 82 | September 8, 2024 | London, England | Undisclosed |
| Caterina Valente Italian singer and actress | 93 | September 9, 2024 | Lugano, Switzerland | |
| Giacomo Dell'Orso Italian composer, arranger and multi-instrumentalist, husband of the more famous singer Edda Dell'Orso and older brother of the composer and record producer Gianni Dell'Orso | 93 | September 9, 2024 | Rome, Italy | |
| Frankie Beverly; Maze | 77 | September 10, 2024 | San Francisco Bay Area, California, United States | Undisclosed |
| Nick Becattini Italian singer, musician and guitarist of the blues genre | 62 | September 10, 2024 | Camaiore, Lucca, Italy | |
| Moisés Canelo; Singer and songwriter | 74 | September 13, 2024 | New York City, New York, United States | Stroke |
| Tommy Cash; Country singer; brother of Johnny Cash | 84 | September 13, 2024 | Gallatin, Tennessee, United States | Undisclosed |
| Chalmers Davis; Keyboardist for Little Richard, Johnny Cash, The Shooters | 73 | September 13, 2024 | Jackson, Mississippi, United States | Undisclosed |
| David Davis; Bluegrass mandolinist and singer | 63 | September 15, 2024 | Snead, Alabama, United States | Traffic accident |
| Kenny Hyslop; Simple Minds, Slik | 73 | September 15, 2024 | Scotland | Prostate cancer |
| Tito Jackson; The Jackson 5 | 70 | September 15, 2024 | Gallup, New Mexico, United States | Heart attack |
| Roli Mosimann; Swans, Wiseblood | 68 | September 15, 2024 | Wrocław, Poland | Lung cancer |
| Billy Edd Wheeler; Singer and songwriter | 91 | September 16, 2024 | Swannanoa, North Carolina, United States | Undisclosed |
| JD Souther; Singer and songwriter | 78 | September 17, 2024 | New Mexico, United States | Undisclosed |
| Juan Brujo; Brujeria | 61 | September 18, 2024 | Wheeling, West Virginia, United States | Heart Attack |
| Dick Diamonde; The Easybeats | 76 | September 18, 2024 | Sydney, New South Wales, Australia | Undisclosed |
| Nick Gravenites; Guitarist for Janis Joplin, Mike Bloomfield, Big Brother and the Holding Company, The Electric Flag | 85 | September 18, 2024 | Santa Rosa, California, United States | Dementia |
| Zulya Kamalova; Singer of world and Russian music | 55 | September 18, 2024 | Melbourne, Australia | Cancer |
| Kathryn Crosby; Actress and singer; wife of Bing Crosby | 90 | September 20, 2024 | Hillsborough, California, United States | Undisclosed |
| Sayuri; Japanese singer, musician, and songwriter | 28 | September 20, 2024 | Japan | Chronic illness |
| Benny Golson; The Jazztet | 95 | September 21, 2024 | New York City, New York, United States | Undisclosed |
| Eddie Low; Country singer | 81 | September 21, 2024 | Christchurch, New Zealand | Cancer |
| Roger Palm; Drummer for ABBA | 75 | September 21, 2024 | Bromma, Stockholm, Sweden | Complications from Alzheimer's disease |
| Freddie Salem; Outlaws | 70 | September 2024 | Akron, Ohio, United States | Undisclosed |
| Cat Glover; Singer for Prince | 62 | September 24, 2024 | Los Angeles, California, United States | Heart failure and COPD |
| Ken Howard; Songwriter for Elvis Presley, The Honeycombs, Dave Dee, Dozy, Beaky, Mick & Tich | 84 | September 24, 2024 | Worthing, West Sussex, England | Undisclosed |
| Pit Passarell; Viper | 56 | September 27, 2024 | São Paulo, Brazil | Pancreatic cancer |
| Coritha; Filipino singer | 73 | September 27, 2024 | Tagaytay, Philippines | Stroke |
| Kris Kristofferson; Country songwriter and singer | 88 | September 28, 2024 | Maui, Hawaii, United States | Undisclosed |
| Martin Lee; Brotherhood of Man | 77 | September 29, 2024 | Surrey, England | Heart failure |
| Dave Allison; Anvil | 68 | September 30, 2024 | Ontario, Canada | Undisclosed |
| Artie Baldacci; Drummer for Heartsfield | 73 | September 30, 2024 | Chicago, Illinois, United States | Cardiac arrest |
| Fayo; Folk guitarist | 46 | September 30, 2024 | Mont-Carmel, Prince Edward Island, Canada | Cancer |
| Farida (Concetta Gangi) Italian singer | 78 | September 30, 2024 | Taormina, Italy | |
| Arvydas Sriubas; Member of Hiperbolė | 70 | October 2, 2024 | Lithuania | Heart attack |
| Ken Tobias; Singer and songwriter | 79 | October 2, 2024 | Saint John, New Brunswick, Canada | Brain cancer |
| Jack Colwell; Australian singer and songwriter | 34 | October 3, 2024 | Sydney, Australia | Undisclosed |
| Nell Smith; Collaborator with The Flaming Lips | 17 | October 5, 2024 | Nanton, Alberta, Canada | Car accident |
| Johnny Neel; The Allman Brothers Band | 70 | October 6, 2024 | Nashville, Tennessee, United States | Heart failure |
| Cissy Houston; Singer, former member of The Sweet Inspirations, mother of Whitney Houston | 91 | October 7, 2024 | New Jersey, United States | Alzheimer's disease |
| Jack Ponti; Songwriter, producer | 66 | October 7, 2024 | Red Bank, New Jersey, United States | Undisclosed |
| S.S. Priest; D'Molls, Diamond Rexx | 61 | October 8, 2024 | Chicago, Illinois, United States | Sepsis |
| Adam Abeshouse; Recording engineer, music producer, and classical violinist | 63 | October 10, 2024 | South Salem, New York, United States | Bile duct cancer |
| Kiril Marichkov; Shturcite | 79 | October 11, 2024 | Selanovtsi, Vratsa Province, Bulgaria | Complications from a fall |
| Dottie Leonard Miller; Music executive | 79 | October 11, 2024 | Hendersonville, Tennessee, United States | Undisclosed |
| Jackmaster; DJ and record producer | 38 | October 12, 2024 | Ibiza, Spain | Complications from head injury |
| Ka; Rapper and producer | 52 | October 12, 2024 | New York, New York, United States | Undisclosed |
| Libby Titus; Singer and songwriter | 77 | October 13, 2024 | | Undisclosed |
| Joshua Perahia; Joshua | 71 | October 14, 2024 | Torrance, California, United States | Undisclosed |
| Ollie Olsen; Max Q | 66 | October 16, 2024 | Parkville, Melbourne, Australia | Multiple system atrophy |
| Alan Mansfield; Dragon | 72 | October 16, 2024 | Sydney, Australia | Complications from radiation treatments |
| Liam Payne; One Direction | 31 | October 16, 2024 | Buenos Aires, Argentina | Fell from a hotel balcony |
| Mitzi Gaynor; Actress and singer | 93 | October 17, 2024 | Los Angeles, California, United States | Natural causes |
| Cindy Charles; Music executive for Twitch | 69 | October 18, 2024 | Amsterdam, Netherlands | Hit by a garbage truck |
| Barbara Dane; Singer, guitarist and record producer | 97 | October 20, 2024 | Oakland, California, United States | Assisted suicide |
| Paul Di'Anno; Iron Maiden, Battlezone, Killers, Gogmagog | 66 | October 21, 2024 | Salisbury, Wiltshire, England | Long-term health problems |
| Jack Jones; Singer | 86 | October 23, 2024 | Rancho Mirage, California, United States | Leukemia |
| Linda LaFlamme; It's a Beautiful Day | 85 | October 23, 2024 | Harrisonburg, Virginia, United States | Vascular dementia |
| DJ Clark Kent; Hip hop record producer and DJ | 58 | October 24, 2024 | Green Brook Township, New Jersey, United States | Colon cancer |
| Marco Paulo; Singer | 79 | October 24, 2024 | Sydney, New South Wales, Australia | Cancer |
| Hans Rotmo; Singer and songwriter | 76 | October 24, 2024 | Vestby, Norway | Undisclosed |
| Phil Lesh; Grateful Dead | 84 | October 25, 2024 | Los Angeles, California, United States | Undisclosed |
| Bill Beach; Rockabilly musician | 92 | October 28, 2024 | Hamilton, Ohio, United States | Undisclosed |
| Manuel "Guajiro" Mirabal; Buena Vista Social Club | 91 | October 28, 2024 | Havana, Cuba | Undisclosed |
| Italo Ianne Italian singer, composer and record producer | 82 | October 28, 2024 | Venice, Italy | |
| Nadia Cattouse; Actress and singer-songwriter | 99 | October 29, 2024 | London, England | Undisclosed |
| Richard Andrew; Underground Lovers, Crow, Black Cab | 58 | October 30, 2024 | Melbourne, Australia | Lung cancer |
| Candy Devine; Actress and singer | 85 | October 31, 2024 | Australia | Undisclosed |
| Alex 'Zac' Zytnik; Tamam Shud | 79 | November 1, 2024 | Newcastle, New South Wales | Undisclosed |
| Quincy Jones; Record producer, songwriter, and arranger | 91 | November 3, 2024 | Los Angeles, California, United States | Pancreatic cancer |
| Andy Leek; Dexys Midnight Runners | 66 | November 3, 2024 | Walsall, West Midlands, England | Parkinson's disease |
| Johnny Madsen; Dalton | 73 | November 4, 2024 | Nordby on the island of Fanø, Denmark | Undisclosed |
| Tyka Nelson; Singer; sister of Prince | 64 | November 4, 2024 | Robbinsdale, Minnesota, United States | Undisclosed |
| Agnaldo Rayol; Singer and actor | 86 | November 4, 2024 | São Paulo, Brazil | Complications from a fall at his house |
| Kathleen Watkins; Actress and singer | 90 | November 7, 2024 | Dublin, Ireland | Undisclosed |
| Lou Donaldson; Jazz alto saxophonist | 98 | November 9, 2024 | Fort Lauderdale, Florida, United States | Undisclosed |
| Ella Jenkins; Folk singer and songwriter | 100 | November 9, 2024 | Chicago, Illinois, United States | Undisclosed |
| Ram Narayan; Sarangi player | 96 | November 9, 2024 | Mumbai, India | Undisclosed |
| Pepe Justicia; Flamenco guitarist | 64 | November 10, 2024 | Jerez de la Frontera, Spain | Undisclosed |
| Johnny Duhan; Folk singer and songwriter | 74 | November 12, 2024 | Off the coast of County Galway | Drowned |
| Roy Haynes; Jazz drummer | 99 | November 12, 2024 | Nassau County, New York, United States | Undisclosed |
| Agnes Buen Garnås; Folk singer | 78 | November 12, 2024 | Notodden, Norway | Undisclosed |
| Edgard Brito; Tuatha de Danann | 50 | November 12, 2024 | São Paulo, Brazil | Undisclosed |
| Shel Talmy; Record producer for the Kinks, the Who, the Easybeats | 87 | November 13, 2024 | Los Angeles, California, United States | Complications from a stroke |
| Tommy Alverson; Texas country musician | 72 | November 14, 2024 | Fort Worth, Texas, United States | Liver cancer |
| Dennis Bryon; Drummer for the Bee Gees, Amen Corner | 75 | November 14, 2024 | Nashville, Tennessee, United States | Undisclosed |
| Vic Flick; Guitarist behind the "James Bond Theme" in Dr. No | 87 | November 14, 2024 | Los Angeles, California, United States | Complications from Alzheimer's disease |
| Peter Sinfield; Lyricist for King Crimson | 80 | November 14, 2024 | London, England | Undisclosed |
| Gerry Weil; Jazz musician | 85 | November 16, 2024 | Caracas, Venezuela | Undisclosed |
| Andrius Kulikauskas; Member of Dainos Teatras | 73 | November 17, 2024 | Lithuania | Unknown |
| Vladimir Lyovkin; Na Na | 57 | November 17, 2024 | Moscow, Russia | Leukemia |
| Charles Dumont; Singer and composer | 95 | November 18, 2024 | Paris, France | Undisclosed |
| Colin Petersen; Drummer for the Bee Gees, Humpy Bong | 78 | November 18, 2024 | Australia | Undisclosed |
| Mercy Sunot; Aegis | 48 | November 18, 2024 | San Francisco, California, United States | Cancer |
| Diva Gray; Chic Change | 72 | November 19, 2024 | United States | Undisclosed |
| Saafir; Rapper and producer | 54 | November 19, 2024 | Oakland, California | Undisclosed |
| Fratello Metallo (Cesare Bonizzi) Italian singer-songwriter | 78 | November 19, 2024 | Bergamo, Italy | |
| Andy Paley; The Paley Brothers, The Modern Lovers | 72 | November 20, 2024 | Colchester, Vermont, United States | Throat cancer |
| Mike Pinera; Blues Image, Iron Butterfly | 76 | November 20, 2024 | Tampa, Florida, United States | Liver failure |
| Harry Williams; Bloodstone | 80 | November 22, 2024 | Kansas City, Missouri, United States | Undisclosed |
| Chuck Woolery; Actor and musician; The Avant-Garde | 83 | November 23, 2024 | Horseshoe Bay, Texas, United States | Undisclosed |
| Bob Bryar; My Chemical Romance | 44 | November 24, 2024 | Shelbyville, Tennessee, United States | Undisclosed |
| Helen Gallagher; Actress and singer | 98 | November 24, 2024 | New York City, New York, United States | Undisclosed |
| Leah Kunkel; Singer and songwriter | 76 | November 26, 2024 | Amherst, Massachusetts, United States | Cancer |
| Artt Frank; Jazz drummer for Chet Baker | 91 | November 27, 2024 | Tucson and Green Valley, Arizona, United States | Undisclosed |
| Will Cullen Hart; The Olivia Tremor Control, Circulatory System | 53 | November 29, 2024 | Ruston, Louisiana, United States | Heart attack |
| Steve Alaimo; Singer and record producer | 84 | November 30, 2024 | Miami, Florida, United States | Undisclosed |
| Jacques Barsamian; Singer | 81 | December 1, 2024 | Paris, France | Undisclosed |
| Samantha Lawrence; Wee Papa Girl Rappers | 55 | December 1, 2024 | | Cancer |
| Liu Chia-chang; Taiwanese singer, songwriter, and producer | 81 | December 2, 2024 | Taipei, Taiwan, China | Cancer |
| Mario Tessuto Italian singer | 81 | December 5, 2024 | Vigevano, Italy | |
| Angela Alvarez; Singer; oldest winner of the Latin Grammy Award for Best New Artist | 97 | December 6, 2024 | Baton Rouge, Louisiana, United States | Undisclosed |
| Miho Nakayama; Singer and actress | 54 | December 6, 2024 | Tokyo, Japan | Bathing accident |
| Dickie Rock; The Miami Showband | 88 | December 6, 2024 | Dublin, Ireland | Undisclosed |
| Jeanne Bamberger; Music educator | 100 | December 12, 2024 | Berkeley, California, United States | Undisclosed |
| Jon Camp; Renaissance | 75 | December 13, 2024 | London, England | Undisclosed |
| Zakir Hussain; Tabla player, composer, percussionist, music producer | 73 | December 15, 2024 | San Francisco, California, United States | Idiopathic pulmonary fibrosis |
| Anita Bryant; Singer | 84 | December 16, 2024 | Edmond, Oklahoma, United States | Cancer |
| Steve Lewinson; Simply Red | 58 | December 16, 2024 | London, England | Cancer |
| Alfa Anderson; Chic | 78 | December 17, 2024 | United States | Undisclosed |
| Mike Brewer; Brewer & Shipley | 80 | December 17, 2024 | somewhere near Branson, Missouri, United States | Undisclosed |
| David Mallett; Singer and songwriter | 73 | December 17, 2024 | Sebec, Maine | Cancer |
| Slim Dunlap; The Replacements | 73 | December 18, 2024 | Minneapolis, Minnesota, United States | Complications from a stroke |
| Heikki Silvennoinen; Finnish musician and actor | 70 | December 18, 2024 | Pälkäne, Finland | A long illness |
| Gaboro; Rapper and songwriter | 23 | December 19, 2024 | Norrköping, Sweden | Shot |
| Stanley Booth; Music journalist | 82 | December 20, 2024 | Memphis, Tennessee, United States | Undisclosed |
| Sugar Pie DeSanto; Singer and dancer | 89 | December 20, 2024 | Oakland, California, United States | Undisclosed |
| Helena Zeťová; Black Milk | 44 | December 20, 2024 | Prostřední Bečva, Czechia | Undisclosed |
| Casey Chaos; Amen, Christian Death | 59 | December 21, 2024 | Laurel Canyon, California, United States | Heart attack |
| John Sykes; Whitesnake, Thin Lizzy, Tygers of Pan Tang, Blue Murder | 65 | December 21, 2024 | London, England | Cancer |
| Richard Perry; Record producer | 82 | December 24, 2024 | Los Angeles, California, United States | Cardiac arrest |
| Dulce; Actress and singer | 69 | December 25, 2024 | Mexico City, Mexico | Complications from lung cancer |
| OG Maco; Rapper | 32 | December 26, 2024 | Los Angeles, California, United States | Suicide by gunshot |
| Linda Lavin; Actress and singer | 87 | December 29, 2024 | Los Angeles, California, United States | Complications from lung cancer |
| Sickie Wifebeater (Eric Carlson); Mentors, Jesters of Destiny | 66 | December 29, 2024 | Seattle, Washington, United States | Cancer |
| Bob Bertles; Jazz saxophonist | 85 | December 30, 2024 | Sydney, New South Wales, Australia | Undisclosed |
| Loretta Di Franco; Operatic soprano | 82 | December 30, 2024 | New York City, United States | Undisclosed |
| Don Nix; Musician, songwriter, and record producer | 83 | December 31, 2024 | Germantown, Tennessee, United States | Undisclosed |
| Paolo Benvegnù Italian singer-songwriter | 59 | December 31, 2024 | Toscolano Maderno, Italy | |

== See also ==
- List of deaths in popular music
- List of murdered hip hop musicians
- 27 Club
