= To Play Some Music =

Single by Journey

from the album Journey
- B-side: "Topaz"
- Released: June 1975
- Recorded: 1974
- Studio: CBS Studios, San Francisco, California
- Genre: Progressive rock
- Length: 3:19
- Label: Columbia
- Songwriters: Gregg Rolie, Neal Schon
- Producer: Roy Halee

Journey singles chronology
"To Play Some Music" (1975)	"On a Saturday Nite" (1976)

"To Play Some Music" is the first single released by the American rock group Journey. It originally appeared as the fourth track on the band's eponymous 1975 debut album.

== Album and single release ==
The album Journey was released as the band's first LP by Columbia Records on April 1, 1975. Two months later, Columbia also issued the band's first single. "To Play Some Music" was chosen as the A-side, while the B-side featured another cut from Journey, the instrumental fifth track "Topaz" ("Topaz" followed "To Play Some Music" on the album running order). "To Play Some Music" was written by Gregg Rolie and Neal Schon, while "Topaz" was penned by George Tickner.

Journey would ultimately peak at #138 on The Billboard 200 album chart in the United States and also at #72 in Japan. However, "To Play Some Music" has never appeared on any major singles chart Worldwide. It was the only single issued from the band's debut album.

Cash Box said that "from its opening organ riffs clean through to its rocking solo parts, Journey explodes with a solid, tightly produced disk."

== Personnel ==
- Neal Schon – lead guitar
- George Tickner – rhythm guitar
- Gregg Rolie – keyboards, vocals
- Ross Valory – bass guitar
- Aynsley Dunbar – drums
