= List of 2022 deaths in popular music =

This is a list of notable performers of rock music and other forms of popular music, and others directly associated with the music as producers, songwriters, or in other closely related roles, who died in 2022.

== 2022 deaths in popular music ==
Preceded by 2021	List of deaths in popular music 2022	Succeeded by 2023

Name	Age	Date	Location of death	Cause of death
Jay Weaver; Big Daddy Weave	42	January 2, 2022	Nashville, Tennessee, United States	COVID-19
Lewis Jordan; The Jordan Brothers	74	January 3, 2022	Frackville, Pennsylvania, United States	Undisclosed causes
Jessie Daniels; Force MDs	58	January 4, 2022	Staten Island, New York, United States	Undisclosed causes
Calvin Simon; Parliament-Funkadelic	79	January 6, 2022	San Antonio, Florida, United States	Unknown
Bobby Harrison; Procol Harum, Freedom, Snafu	82	January 7, 2022	Leigh-on-Sea, Essex, England	
R. Dean Taylor	82	January 7, 2022	Los Angeles, California, United States	Complications due to COVID-19
James Mtume; Mtume	76	January 9, 2022	South Orange, New Jersey, United States	Unknown
Gerry Granahan	89	January 10, 2022	East Greenwich, Rhode Island, United States	Undisclosed
Burke Shelley; Budgie	71	January 10, 2022	Cardiff, Wales	Undisclosed illness
Rosa Lee Hawkins; The Dixie Cups	76	January 11, 2022	Tampa, Florida, United States	Complications from a surgery
Maria Cristina Brancucci Italian singer, especially a performer of songs in animated films	81	January 11, 2022	Rome, Italy	
Ronnie Spector; The Ronettes	78	January 12, 2022	New York City, New York, United States	Cancer
Fred Parris; The Five Satins	85	January 13, 2022	New Haven, Connecticut, United States	Brief illness
Sonny Turner; The Platters	82	January 13, 2022	Los Angeles, California, United States	Throat cancer
Dallas Frazier	82	January 14, 2022	Gallatin, Tennessee, United States	Related complications
Greg Webster; Ohio Players	84	January 14, 2022	Dayton, Ohio, United States	Undisclosed
Rachel Nagy; The Detroit Cobras	48	January 16, 2022	Michigan, United States	Cardiomyopathy
Beverly Ross; Ronald & Ruby	87	January 17, 2022	Nashville, Tennessee, United States	Dementia
Dick Halligan; Blood, Sweat & Tears	78	January 18, 2022	Rome, Italy	Natural causes
Freddie Hughes	78	January 18, 2022	Oakland, California, United States	Leukemia/Complications of COVID-19
Meat Loaf	74	January 20, 2022	Nashville, Tennessee, United States	Undisclosed causes
Don Wilson; The Ventures	88	January 22, 2022	Tacoma, Washington, United States	Natural causes
Boris Pfeiffer; In Extremo	53	January 24, 2022	Wandlitz, Germany	Natural causes
Pat King; Manfred Mann's Earth Band	78	January 25, 2022	Olvera, Andalucía, Spain	
Janet Mead	84	January 26, 2022	Adelaide, South Australia, Australia	Cancer
Diego Verdaguer	70	January 27, 2022	Los Angeles, California, United States	COVID-19
Sam Lay; Paul Butterfield Blues Band	86	January 29, 2022	Chicago, Illinois, United States	Unknown
Norma Waterson; The Watersons	82	January 30, 2022	North Yorkshire, England	Pneumonia
Hargus "Pig" Robbins	84	January 30, 2022	United States	Undisclosed
Jimmy Johnson; Syl Johnson's Brother	93	January 31, 2022	Harvey, Illinois, United States	Unknown
Glenn Wheatley; The Masters Apprentices	74	February 1, 2022	Melbourne, Victoria, Australia	Complications of COVID-19
Jon Zazula; Founder of Megaforce Records	69	February 1, 2022	Clermont, Florida, United States	CIDP, COPD and osteopenia
Willie Leacox; America	74	February 2, 2022	Stockton, California, United States	Unknown
Donny Gerrard; Skylark	75	February 3, 2022	Santa Fe, New Mexico, United States	Cancer
Kerry Chater; Gary Puckett & The Union Gap	76	February 4, 2022	Nashville, Tennessee, United States	Unknown causes
Syl Johnson	85	February 6, 2022	Mableton, Georgia, United States	Congestive heart failure
Happy Ruggiero (Felice Ruggiero) Italian record producer, composer and singer	83	February 6, 2022	Asti, Italy	
Betty Davis	77	February 9, 2022	Homestead, Pennsylvania, United States	Natural causes/Cancer
Ian McDonald; King Crimson, Foreigner	75	February 9, 2022	New York City, New York, United States	Cancer
Steve Salas; Tierra, El Chicano	69	February 10, 2022	United States	Multiple myeloma/COVID-19
Chet McCracken; The Doobie Brothers	75	February 11, 2022	Los Angeles, California, United States	Undisclosed causes
Mike Rabon; The Five Americans	78	February 11, 2022	United States	Undisclosed causes
Miguel Vicens Danus; Bassist for Los Bravos	78	February 12, 2022	Palma, Spain	Pneumonia
King Louie Bankston; The Exploding Hearts	49	February 13, 2022	United States	Heart failure
Sandy Nelson	83	February 14, 2022	Las Vegas, Nevada, United States	Complications from stroke
Roger Segal; Trashlight Vision	49	February 14, 2022	South Philadelphia, Philadelphia, Pennsylvania, United States	Murder
Pete McClanahan Warrior Soul	62	February 16, 2022	Cranston, Rhode Island, United States	Undisclosed
Dallas Good; The Sadies	48	February 17, 2022	Toronto, Ontario, Canada	Heart condition
Marc Hamilton	78	February 17, 2022	Saint-Jerome, Quebec, Canada	COVID-19
Fausto Cigliano Italian singer and guitarist	85	February 17, 2022	Rome, Italy	
Gary Brooker; Procol Harum	76	February 19, 2022	Surrey, England	Cancer
Joni James	91	February 20, 2022	West Palm Beach, Florida, United States	Undisclosed
Mark Lanegan; Screaming Trees, Queens of the Stone Age, The Gutter Twins	57	February 22, 2022	Killarney, Ireland	Unknown causes
Danny Spanos	58	February 23, 2022	Las Vegas, Nevada, United States	Undisclosed illness
Snootie Wild	36	February 26, 2022	Houston, Texas, United States	Murder
Nick Tesco; The Members	67	February 26, 2022	United Kingdom	Undisclosed
Warner Mack	87	March 1, 2022	Nashville, Tennessee, United States	Undisclosed
Chuck Criss; Freelance Whales	36	March 3, 2022	Queens, New York, United States	Suicide
Mike Cross; Sponge	57	March 6, 2022	United States	Undisclosed causes
John Dean; The Reflections	80	March 8, 2022	United States	Undisclosed causes
Ziggy Sigmund; Econoline Crush, Slow	56	March 8, 2022	United States	Unknown
Richard Podolor; The Pets and record producer for Steppenwolf, Three Dog Night	86	March 9, 2022	Encino, California, United States	Undisclosed cause
Bobbie Nelson	91	March 10, 2022	Austin, Texas, United States	Lung cancer
Brad Martin	48	March 11, 2022	Nashville, Tennessee, United States	Undisclosed
Timmy Thomas	77	March 11, 2022	Miami, Florida, United States	Cancer
Traci Braxton; The Braxtons	50	March 12, 2022	United States	Esophageal cancer
Barry Bailey; Atlanta Rhythm Section	73	March 12, 2022	Madison, Georgia, United States	Complications of multiple sclerosis
LaShun Pace	60	March 21, 2022	Atlanta, Georgia, United States	Organ failure
Bert Ruiter; Focus, Earth and Fire	75	March 24, 2022	Blaricum, Netherlands	Undisclosed
Taylor Hawkins; Foo Fighters	50	March 25, 2022	Bogotá, Colombia	Cardiovascular collapse after drug overdose
Bobby Hendricks; The Drifters	84	March 25, 2022	Lancaster, California, United States	Alzheimer's disease
Keith Martin	55	March 25, 2022	Quezon City, Philippines	Acute myocardial infarction
Jeff Carson	58	March 26, 2022	Franklin, Tennessee, United States	Heart attack
Keaton Pierce; Too Close to Touch	31	March 27, 2022	United States	Acute pancreatitis
Jimmy Karstein; Gary Lewis & the Playboys	78	March 27, 2022	Tulsa, Oklahoma, United States	Undisclosed
Mira Calix	52	March 28, 2022	Bedford, England	Suicide
Tabby Diamond; Mighty Diamonds	67	March 29, 2022	Kingston, Jamaica	Shot
Tom Parker; The Wanted	33	March 30, 2022	London, England	Glioblastoma
Yanick Étienne; Roxy Music	64	March 30, 2022	Gainesville, Florida, United States	Cancer
Fred Johnson; The Marcels	80	March 31, 2022	United States	Undisclosed causes
Bunny Simpson; Mighty Diamonds	71	April 1, 2022	Kingston, Jamaica	Diabetes
C. W. McCall	93	April 1, 2022	Ouray, Colorado, United States	Cancer
Roland White; The Kentucky Colonels	83	April 1, 2022	Nashville, Tennessee, United States	Complications from heart attack
Archie Eversole	37	April 3, 2022	Decatur, Georgia, United States	Murder
Jordan Mooney; Adam and the Ants	66	April 3, 2022	Seaford, East Sussex, England	Cholangiocarcinoma
Joe Messina; The Funk Brothers	93	April 4, 2022	Northville, Michigan, United States	Kidney disease
Bobby Rydell	79	April 5, 2022	Abington, Pennsylvania, United States	Complications of pneumonia
Con Cluskey; The Bachelors	86	April 8, 2022	Halifax, West Yorkshire, England	Complications of COVID-19
Wade Buff; The Dream Weavers	87	April 8, 2022	New Albany, Ohio, United States	Undislosed
Chris Bailey; The Saints	65	April 9, 2022	Haarlem, Netherlands	Undisclosed cause
Giampaolo Loddo Musician, guitarist, singer, actor, comedian, and historic figure in Sardinian entertainment	91	April 9, 2022	Cagliari, Italy	
Giulietta Sacco Italian singer	77	April 11, 2022	Aversa, Italy	
Charles E. McCormick; Bloodstone	75	April 12, 2022	Los Angeles, California, United States	Lengthy illness
Tim Feerick; Dance Gavin Dance	34	April 13, 2022	Sacramento, California, United States	Fentanyl overdose
Peter McEwan; Staind	55	April 15, 2022	United States	Unknown
Roderick "Pooh" Clark; Hi-Five	49	April 17, 2022	Waco, Texas, United States	Complications infection & pneumonia
DJ Kay Slay	55	April 17, 2022	New York City, New York, United States	COVID-19
Re Styles; The Tubes	72	April 17, 2022	San Francisco, California, United States	Complications from stroke
Catherine Spaak Belgian -born Italian actress, singer, television presenter and dancer	77	April 17, 2022	Rome, Italy	Ischemic attack
Jerry Doucette	70	April 18, 2022	Delta, British Columbia, Canada	Cancer
Guitar Shorty	87	April 20, 2022	Los Angeles, California, United States	Natural causes
Andrew Woolfolk; Earth, Wind & Fire	71	April 20, 2022	Aurora, Colorado, United States	
Marco Occhetti (Kim) Cugini di Campagna	62	April 22, 2022	Rome, Italy	Cardiac arrest
Susan Jacks; The Poppy Family	73	April 25, 2022	Surrey, Canada	Kidney disease-related
Jimmy Thomas; Kings of Rhythm	83	April 25, 2022	Hammersmith, London, England	Respiratory failure
Shane Yellowbird	42	April 25, 2022	Calgary, Alberta, Canada	Undisclosed causes
Henny Vrienten; Doe Maar	73	April 25, 2022	Diepenheim, Netherlands	Lung cancer
Klaus Schulze; Tangerine Dream, Ash Ra Tempel	74	April 26, 2022	Lüneburg, Germany	Undisclosed illness
Randy Rand; Autograph	71	April 26, 2022	Los Angeles, California, United States	Unknown
Judy Henske	85	April 27, 2022	Los Angeles, California, United States	Long illness
DJ Delete	30	April 30, 2022	Waalwijk, Netherlands	Undisclosed causes
Ray Fenwick; Ian Gillan Band, The Spencer Davis Group, Forcefield, Fancy	75	April 30, 2022	England	
Naomi Judd; The Judds	76	April 30, 2022	Nashville, Tennessee, United States	Suicide by gunshot
Gabe Serbian; The Locust, Head Wound City, Zu Band	44	April 30, 2022	United States	Unknown causes
Ric Parnell; Spinal Tap, Atomic Rooster	70	May 1, 2022	Missoula, Montana, United States	Organ failure caused by blood clot in lungs
Howie Pyro; D Generation	61	May 4, 2022	Los Angeles, California, United States	Complications from COVID-19-related pneumonia following a liver transplant and liver disease
Jewell Caples	53	May 6, 2022	United States	Lung injury illness
Mickey Gilley	86	May 7, 2022	Branson, Missouri, United States	Complications from bone cancer
Dennis Waterman	74	May 8, 2022	Madrid, Spain	Lung cancer
Trevor Strnad; The Black Dahlia Murder	41	May 11, 2022	United States	Suicide
Ben Moore; James & Bobby Purify	80	May 12, 2022	Pensacola, Florida, United States	
Lil Keed	24	May 13, 2022	Los Angeles, California, United States	Kidney failure resulting from eosinophilia
Ricky Gardiner; Beggars Opera	73	May 13, 2022	Scotland	Parkinson's disease
Rosmarie Trapp; Trapp Family	93	May 13, 2022	Morrisville, Vermont, United States	Unknown causes
Rick Price; The Move, Wizzard	77	May 17, 2022	England	Natural causes
Vangelis; Aphrodite's Child	79	May 17, 2022	Paris, France	Heart failure
Cathal Coughlan; Microdisney, The Fatima Mansions	61	May 18, 2022	London, England	Long undisclosed illness
Bernard Wright	58	May 19, 2022	Dallas, Texas, United States	Traffic accident
Gennaro Cannavacciuolo Italian actor and singer	60	May 24, 2022	Rome, Italy	
Alan White; Yes, Plastic Ono Band	72	May 26, 2022	Newcastle, Washington, United States	Undisclosed health issues
Andy Fletcher; Depeche Mode	60	May 26, 2022	Brighton, East Sussex, England	Aortic dissection
Sidhu Moose Wala	28	May 29, 2022	Jawaharke, Mansa, India	Shot
Ronnie Hawkins	87	May 29, 2022	Peterborough, Ontario, Canada	Pancreatic cancer
Steve Broughton; Edgar Broughton Band	72	May 29, 2022	London, England	
Hempo Hildén; Pugh Rogefeldt, Dokken	69	May 30, 2022	Karlskrona, Sweden	
Krishnakumar Kunnath	53	May 31, 2022	Kolkata, West Bengal, India	Heart attack
Kelly Joe Phelps; Blues and country musician and songwriter	62	May 31, 2022	Iowa, United States	Undisclosed
Deborah McCrary; The McCrary Sisters	67	June 1, 2022	Nashville, Tennessee, United States	Unknown
Alec John Such; Bon Jovi	70	June 5, 2022	Horry County, South Carolina, United States	Heart attack
Laura Gray (Cinzia) Italian singer	81	June 5, 2022	Naples, Italy	Pancreatic cancer
Jim Seals; The Champs, Seals and Crofts	80	June 6, 2022	Nashville, Tennessee, United States	Complications from stroke
Julee Cruise	65	June 9, 2022	Pittsfield, Massachusetts, United States	Suicide
Uwe Christoffers; Sodom	56	June 10, 2022	Germany	Undisclosed
Gian Pietro Felisatti Italian singer-songwriter and composer who was active between the 1960s and the first half of the 1970s as a musician and singer with the Funamboli group, and in the second half of the decade as a soloist. He also achieved fame abroad, particularly in France, Great Britain and Spain	72	June 18, 2022	Pavia, Italy	
Brett Tuggle; Fleetwood Mac, Coverdale/Page	70	June 19, 2022	Denver, Colorado, United States	Complications related to cancer
Jim Schwall; Siegel–Schwall Band	79	June 19, 2022	Tucson, Arizona, United states	Natural causes
Marina Marfoglia Italian actress, singer, model and dancer	76	June 19, 2022	Rome, Italy	Illness for a long time
Yuri Shatunov; Laskovyi Mai	48	June 23, 2022	Moscow, Russia	Heart failure
Massimo Morante Italian singer, guitarist, and composer	69	June 23, 2022	Rome, Italy	
Irene Fargo Italian singer and actress	59	July 1, 2022	Brescia, Italy	Long illness
Antonio Cripezzi Italian singer and keyboard player	76	July 3, 2022	San Giovanni Teatino, Chieti, Italy	Illness after a concert nearby in Pescara
Manny Charlton; Nazareth	80	July 5, 2022	Texas, United States	Undisclosed
Adam Wade	87	July 7, 2022	Montclair, New Jersey, United States	Complications of Parkinson disease
Junior Magli Italian singer	75	July 8, 2022		
Barbara Thompson; Colosseum, United Jazz + Rock Ensemble	77	July 9, 2022	United Kingdom	Parkinson's disease
Monty Norman; Known for his James Bond Theme	94	July 11, 2022	Slough, England	Short Illness
Dave Wintour; The Wurzels	77	July 12, 2022	Drumnacross, Killraine, Ireland	Cancer
Vaidas Kaselis; Bassist for Requiem	47	July 13, 2022	Lithuania	Diabetes
Michael James Jackson; Music producer for Kiss, L.A. Guns	65	July 13, 2022	Los Angeles, California, United States	COVID-19-related pneumonia
William Hart; The Delfonics	77	July 14, 2022	Philadelphia, Pennsylvania, U.S.	Complications from surgery
Paul Ryder; Happy Mondays	58	July 15, 2022	Sunderland, England	Undisclosed causes
Michael Henderson; Miles Davis	71	July 19, 2022	Dallas, Georgia, U.S.	Cancer
Q Lazzarus	61	July 19, 2022	New York, United States	Undisclosed causes
Jody Abbott; Member of Breaking Point, Fuel	57	July 20, 2022	Memphis, Tennessee, U.S.	Huntington's disease
Frederick Waite Jr. Musical Youth	55	July 20, 2022	Birmingham, England	Undisclosed causes
Kenichi Ōkuma Composer of the music for Pokémon in Super Smash Bros.	56	July 22, 2022	Japan	Esophageal cancer
Antonino Caponnetto (Brigantony) Italian singer-songwriter	74	July 22, 2022	Catania, Italy	
Vittorio De Scalzi Italian singer and multi-instrumentalist of the New Trolls	72	July 24, 2022	Imperia, Italy	Pulmonary fibrosis that occurred after recovery from Covid-19 and a long period of hospitalization
Mike Logan British keyboardist, singer, composer, lyricist and arranger	75	July 26, 2022	Milan, Italy	
JayDaYoungan	24	July 27, 2022	Bogalusa, Louisiana, U.S.	Shot
Tom Springfield; The Springfields, The Seekers	88	July 27, 2022	London, England	Unknown causes
Bernard Cribbins	93	July 27, 2022	Weybridge, Surrey, England	
Jim Sohns; The Shadows of Knight	75	July 29, 2022	Elk Grove Village, Illinois, U.S.	Complications from a stroke
Joe Damiano American singer	92	July 29, 2022	Philadelphia, Pennsylvania, U.S.	
Archie Roach	66	July 30, 2022	Warrnambool, Victoria, Australia	Undisclosed causes
Nicky Moore; Samson	75	August 3, 2022	England	Parkinson's disease
Sam Gooden; The Impressions	87	August 4, 2022	Chattanooga, Tennessee, U.S.	Heart attack
Judith Durham; The Seekers	79	August 5, 2022	Melbourne, Australia	Bronchiectasis
Daniel Lévi	60	August 6, 2022	Bouches-du-Rhone, France	Undisclosed
David Muse; Firefall, The Marshall Tucker Band	73	August 6, 2022	Indianapolis, Indiana, U.S.	Cancer
Gord Lewis; Teenage Head	65	August 7, 2022	Hamilton, Ontario, Canada	Murdered
Lamont Dozier	81	August 8, 2022	Scottsdale, Arizona U.S.	Unknown
Olivia Newton-John	73	August 8, 2022	Santa Ynez Valley, California, U.S.	Breast cancer
Darryl Hunt; The Pogues	72	August 9, 2022	London, England	Undisclosed causes
Bill Pitman; Wrecking Crew	102	August 11, 2022	La Quinta, California, U.S.	Fractured his spine after a fall
Darius Campbell Danesh	41	August 11, 2022	Rochester, Minnesota, U.S.	Inhalation of chloroethane
Steve Grimmett; Grim Reaper, Onslaught, Lionsheart, Chateaux	62	August 15, 2022	Bristol, England	
Paul Tesluk; Johnny and the Hurricanes	82	August 20, 2022	U.S.	Undisclosed causes
Stuart Anstis; Cradle of Filth	48	August 21, 2022		
Jaimie Branch; Jazz trumpeter and composer	39	August 22, 2022	Brooklyn, New York, U.S.	Drug overdose
Margaret Urlich	57	August 22, 2022	Southern Highlands, Australia	Cancer
Piotr Szkudelski; Perfect	66	August 22, 2022	Warsaw, Poland	Undisclosed causes
Jerry Allison; The Crickets	82	August 22, 2022	Lyles, Tennessee, U.S.	Cancer
Mable John	91	August 25, 2022	Los Angeles, California, U.S.	Undisclosed
Luke Bell	32	August 26, 2022	Tucson, Arizona, U.S.	Fentanyl overdose
David Young; John Cale Band, Element of Crime	73	August 31, 2022	England	Undisclosed causes
Drummie Zeb; Aswad	62	September 2, 2022	London, England	Unknown
Jimbo Doares; The Swingin' Medallions	78	September 7, 2022	U.S.	Unknown
Dave Sherman; Spirit Caravan, Earthride, Wretched	55	September 7, 2022	Clarksburg, Maryland, United States	
Ramsey Lewis	87	September 12, 2022	Chicago, Illinois, U.S.	Undisclosed causes
Dennis East; South African singer	73	September 12, 2022	Durban, South Africa	Stroke
PnB Rock	30	September 12, 2022	Los Angeles, California, U.S.	Shot
Jesse Powell	51	September 13, 2022	Los Angeles, California, U.S.	Cardiac arrest
Irene Papas	93	September 14, 2022	Chiliomodi, Corinthia, Greece	Alzheimer's disease
David Andersson; Soilwork, The Night Flight Orchestra	47	September 14, 2022	Sweden	Undisclosed causes
Jim Post; Friend & Lover	82	September 14, 2022	Dubuque, Iowa, U.S.	Congestive heart failure
Anton Fier; The Lounge Lizards, The Golden Palominos, The Feelies	66	September 21, 2022	Zurich, Switzerland	Suicide
Stu Allan; Clock	60	September 22, 2022	Manchester, England	Gastrointestinal stromal tumor
Pharoah Sanders; John Coltrane	81	September 24, 2022	Los Angeles, California, U.S.	Undisclosed
Leonidas Šumskis; Lithuanian singer	77	September 25, 2022	Moscow, Russia	Unknown
Christian Hummer; Wanda	32	September 26, 2022	Austria	Long & severe illness
Boris Moiseev	68	September 27, 2022	Moscow, Russia	Stroke
Coolio; WC and the Maad Circle	59	September 28, 2022	Los Angeles, California, U.S.	Heart attack caused by a drug overdose
Edoardo Guarnera Italian tenor, actor and television personality	62	September 28, 2022	Rome, Italy	
Loretta Lynn	90	October 4, 2022	Hurricane Mills, Tennessee, U.S.	Natural causes
Jody Miller	80	October 6, 2022	Blanchard, Oklahoma, U.S.	Complications related to Parkinson's Disease
Steve Roberts; Drummer for U.K. Subs	68	October 8, 2022	York, England, UK	Suicide by hanging
Anita Kerr	94	October 10, 2022	Carouge, Geneva, Switzerland	Undisclosed
Willie Spence	23	October 11, 2022	Jasper, Tennessee, United States	Car accident
Danny "Monsta O" Devoux; Boo-Yaa T.R.I.B.E.	56	October 12, 2022	U.S.	Undisclosed causes
Christina Moser Swiss singer-songwriter of Krisma	70	October 13, 2022	Lugano, Switzerland	Long and serious illness
Noel Duggan; Clannad	73	October 15, 2022	County Donegal, Ireland	Choked on a piece of garlic bread
Joyce Sims	63	October 15, 2022	Los Angeles, California, U.S.	
Mikaben	41	October 15, 2022	Paris, France	Cardiac arrest on stage
Robert Gordon	75	October 18, 2022	New York City, New York U.S.	Leukemia
Franco Gatti; Ricchi e Poveri	80	October 18, 2022	Genoa, Italy	Undisclosed causes
Lucy Simon; The Simon Sisters	82	October 20, 2022	Piermont, New York, U.S.	Breast cancer
Paul Stoddard; Diecast	48	October 25, 2022	Brockton, South Easton, Massachusetts, United States	Pulmonary hypertension
Agustín Ramírez; Los Caminantes	70	October 26, 2022	San Bernardino County, California, U.S.	Unknown
Lia Origoni Italian actress and singer	103	October 26, 2022	La Maddalena, Italy	
Geraldine Hunt	77	October 27, 2022	U.S.	Undisclosed causes
Ryan Karazija; Member of Audrye Sessions, Low Roar	40	October 27, 2022	Vilnius, Lithuania	Complications of pneumonia
Jerry Lee Lewis	87	October 28, 2022	DeSoto County, Mississippi, U.S.	Natural causes
D. H. Peligro; Dead Kennedys, Red Hot Chili Peppers	63	October 28, 2022	Los Angeles, California	Heroin and fentanyl overdose
Takeoff; Migos	28	November 1, 2022	Houston, Texas, U.S.	Shot
Aaron Carter	34	November 5, 2022	Lancaster, California, U.S.	Accidental drowning following drug intoxication
Tyrone Downie; Bob Marley and the Wailers	66	November 5, 2022	Kingston, Jamaica	
Mimi Parker; Low	55	November 5, 2022	Duluth, Minnesota U.S.	Ovarian cancer
Carmelo La Bionda; La Bionda	73	November 5, 2022	San Donato Milanese, Lombardy, Italy	Cancer
Tame One; Artifacts, The Weathermen	52	November 6, 2022	U.S.	Heart failure
Hurricane G Hit Squad	52	November 6, 2022	U.S.	Lung cancer
Dan Fawcett; Helix	52	November 6, 2022	London, Ontario, Canada	Murder
Jeff Cook; Alabama	73	November 7, 2022	Destin, Florida, U.S.	Parkinson disease
Dan McCafferty; Nazareth	76	November 8, 2022	Scotland, United Kingdom	Due to the effects of COPD
Gal Costa	77	November 9, 2022	São Paulo, Brazil	Unknown
Garry Roberts; Boomtown Rats	72	November 9, 2022	Bromyard, in the county of Herefordshire, England	Unknown
Nik Turner; Hawkwind	82	November 10, 2022	Pembrokeshire, Walles, England	Unknown
Chris Koerts; Earth and Fire	74	November 10, 2022	France	Lung disease
Gintaras Reklaitis; Member of Mercy Dance, Tipo Grupė	51	November 11, 2022	Kaunas, Lithuania	Suicide
Keith Levene; The Clash, Public Image Ltd	65	November 11, 2022	Norfolk, England	Liver Cancer
Rab Noakes; Stealers Wheel	75	November 11, 2022	Glasgow, Scotland	
Viktoras Malinauskas; Lithuanian Pop singer and member of Estradinės Melodijos, Nemuno Žiburiai, Roko Laboratorija	73	November 12, 2022	Vilnius, Lithuania	Congestive heart failure
Gene Cipriano; The Wrecking Crew	94	November 12, 2022	Studio City, Los Angeles, California, U.S.	Unknown causes
B. Smyth	30	November 17, 2022	U.S.	Pulmonary fibrosis
Dium Italian-senegalese rapper and trapper	34	November 17, 2022	Portoguaro, Venice, Italy	Cardiac arrest
Nico Fidenco Italian singer-songwriter and composer	89	November 18, 2022	Rome, Italy	Natural causes
Danny Kalb; The Blues Project	80	November 19, 2022	Brooklyn, New York City, New York, U.S.	Unknown
Wilko Johnson; Dr. Feelgood	75	November 21, 2022	Southend-on-Sea, England	Pancreatic cancer
Pablo Milanes	79	November 22, 2022	Madrid, Spain	
Hugo Helmig	24	November 23, 2022	Copenhagen, Denmark	Undisclosed causes
Shel Macrae; The Fortunes	77	November 23, 2022	Dudley, England	Undisclosed causes
Irene Cara	63	November 25, 2022	Largo, Florida U.S.	Arteriosclerotic and hypertensive heart disease.
Christine McVie; Fleetwood Mac, Chicken Shack	79	November 30, 2022	London, England	Ischemic stroke and metastatic cancer
Jo Carol Pierce; Singer-songwriter	78	December 2, 2022	Houston, Texas, United States	Lung cancer
Svenne Hedlund; Hep Stars, Idolerna	77	December 3, 2022	Varnamo, Sweden	Undisclosed causes
Manuel Göttsching; Ash Ra Tempel	70	December 4, 2022	Berlin, Germany	Natural causes
Bob McGrath; Childhood hits of Sesame Street	90	December 4, 2022	Norwood, New Jersey, U.S.	Stroke
Jim Stewart; Record producer	92	December 5, 2022	Memphis, Tennessee, U.S.	Undisclosed
Jet Black; The Stranglers	84	December 6, 2022	Wales	Natural causes
Ichirō Mizuki Japanese singer and lyricist	74	December 6, 2022	Tokyo, Japan	Lung cancer
Jess Barr; Slobberbone	46	December 6, 2022	Dallas, Texas, U.S.	Heart condition
Boechi Dutch Rapper	30	December 9, 2022	Willemstad, Curaçao	Shot to Death
Georgia Holt	96	December 10, 2022	Malibu, California, U.S.	Undisclosed
Angelo Badalamenti	85	December 11, 2022	Lincoln Park, New Jersey, U.S.	Natural causes
Betti Zambruno Italian singer and researcher active mainly in the field of popular music, oral history and traditional Piedmontese culture	68	December 12, 2022	Asti, Italy	Long and serious illness
Stephen "tWitch" Boss; American Choreographer	40	December 13, 2022	Los Angeles, California, U.S.	Suicide
Kim Simmonds; Savoy Brown	75	December 13, 2022	Syracuse, New York, U.S.	Colon Cancer
Benjamin Bossi; Romeo Void	69	December 13, 2022	U.S.	Alzheimer's disease
Shirley Eikhard	67	December 15, 2022	Orangeville, Ontario, Canada	Cancer
Dino Danelli; The Rascals	78	December 15, 2022	New York City U.S.	Undisclosed causes
Bertha Barbee-McNeal; The Velvelettes	82	December 15, 2022	Kalamazoo, Michigan, U.S.	Colon Cancer
Rick Anderson; The Tubes	75	December 16, 2022	U.S.	Undisclosed
Charlie Gracie	86	December 16, 2022	Philadelphia, Pennsylvania U.S.	Complications from COVID-19
Martin Duffy; Primal Scream, Felt	55	December 18, 2022	Brighton, East Sussex, England	Brain injury after complications from a fall
Lando Buzzanca Italian actor and singer	87	December 18, 2022	Rome, Italy	Following a progressive and serious physical and cognitive decline that began after a fall in April 2021
Terry Hall; The Specials, Fun Boy Three	63	December 19, 2022	London, England	Pancreatic cancer
Randy Begg; Wednesday	71	December 20, 2022	Belleville, Illinois, U.S.	Heart attack
Harvey Jett; Black Oak Arkansas	73	December 21, 2022	U.S.	Undisclosed causes
Thom Bell; Producer for The Delfonics, The Stylistics, The Spinners	79	December 22, 2022	Bellingham, Washington, U.S.	Unknown
Big Scarr	22	December 22, 2022	Memphis, Tennessee, U.S.	Drug overdose
Guido Pistocchi Italian trumpeter, singer, arranger and composer, he is considered one of the great instrumentalists of the Italian jazz scene	85	December 22, 2022	Savignano sul Rubicone, Italy	
Massimo Savic; Dorian Gray	60	December 23, 2022	Zagreb, Croatia	Lung cancer
Maxi Jazz; Faithless	65	December 23, 2022	London, England	Undisclosed causes
Maria Del Monte Italian actress and singer	77	December 23, 2022	Naples, Italy	
Luther "Guitar Junior" Johnson	83	December 25, 2022	Oxford, Florida, U.S.	Undisclosed causes
Paul Fox; Record producer for XTC, Phish, 10,000 Maniacs	68	December 25, 2022	U.S.	Unknown
Jo Mersa Marley; Bob Marley's Grandson	31	December 27, 2022	Miami-Dade County, Florida, U.S.	Acute asthma exacerbration
Claudia Arvati Chorister	62	December 27, 2022	Rome, Italy	Long illness
Alan Copeland; The Modernaires	96	December 28, 2022	Sonora, California, U.S.	Undisclosed causes
Ian Tyson; Ian & Sylvia	89	December 29, 2022	Longview, Alberta, Canada	Undisclosed
Giovanni Pezzoli Drummer and co-founder of Stadio	70	December 29, 2022	Bologna, Italy	Long illness
Jannis Noya Makrigiannis; Choir of Young Believers	39	December 30, 2022	Denmark	Short illness
Don Williams; The Williams Brothers	100	December 30, 2022	Branson, Missouri, U.S.	Undisclosed causes
Jeremiah Green; Modest Mouse	45	December 31, 2022	Sequim, Washington, U.S.	Cancer
Anita Pointer; The Pointer Sisters	74	December 31, 2022	Beverly Hills, California, U.S.	Cancer

== See also ==
- List of deaths in popular music
- List of murdered hip hop musicians
- 27 Club
