= Next (Journey album) =

Studio album by Journey
- Released: February 1977
- Recorded: May–October 1976
- Studio: His Masters Wheels (San Francisco)
- Genres: Progressive rock; hard rock
- Length: 37:37
- Label: Columbia
- Producer: Journey

Journey chronology
Look into the Future (1976)	Next (1977)	Infinity (1978)

Singles from Next
- 1. "Spaceman" Released: February 28, 1977

Next is the third studio album by the American rock band Journey, released in February 1977. The band continued the formula from 1976's Look into the Future but this album also retains some of their progressive rock style from the first album. It is the last album to feature Gregg Rolie as the primary lead singer, and the last album to feature members of the band on the cover. "Spaceman"/"Nickel and Dime" was the single released from Next.

The instrumental "Cookie Duster" was listed in very early pressings of the album, though not actually included on the album. It was later released on Journey's Time³ compilation.

Next reached No. 85 on the Billboard 200 chart.

Although he did not contribute to Next, lead vocalist Robert Fleischman joined Journey shortly after the album's release as a songwriter and the group's first dedicated frontman, sharing lead vocal duties with Rolie during subsequent live shows. All of the songs on the album vanished from the band's live setlist after 1979 and two ("Spaceman" and "Here We Are") have never been performed live.

== Reception ==
Professional ratings
Review scores
Source	Rating
AllMusic	2/5 stars
Collector's Guide to Heavy Metal	8/10
The Rolling Stone Album Guide	2/5 stars

Retrospectively, AllMusic critic Stephen Thomas Erlewine wrote that "without a forceful lead vocalist like Steve Perry, the group lacks focus and a pop sensibility and its attempts at straight-ahead pop/rock suffer considerably as a result." Canadian journalist Martin Popoff praised the album's variety and the "profusion of good songs", with the musical styles ranging from prog to sophisticated balladry to prog metal.

== Track listing ==
All lead vocals are by Gregg Rolie, except where noted.

Side one
No.	Title	Lyrics	Music	Lead vocals	Length
1.	"Spaceman"	Rolie; Aynsley Dunbar	Rolie		4:01
2.	"People"	Dunbar	Rolie; Neal Schon		5:21
3.	"I Would Find You"	Schon; Tena Austin	Schon	Schon	5:54
4.	"Here We Are"	Rolie	Rolie		4:18

Side two
No.	Title	Lyrics	Music	Lead vocals	Length
5.	"Hustler"	Dunbar	Rolie		3:16
6.	"Next"	Rolie; Dunbar; Heidi Cogdell	Rolie; Schon		5:28
7.	"Nickel and Dime" (instrumental)		Rolie; Schon; George Tickner; Ross Valory		4:13
8.	"Karma"	Dunbar	Rolie; Schon	Schon	5:07
Total length:					37:37

== Personnel ==
=== Journey ===
- Gregg Rolie – keyboards, lead vocals
- Neal Schon – electric and acoustic guitars, lead vocals on "I Would Find You" and "Karma"
- Ross Valory – bass guitar, backing vocals
- Aynsley Dunbar – drums, percussion

=== Additional personnel ===
- Smiggy – engineer, mixing
- Bruce Botnick – mastering
- Herbie Herbert – director
- Bruce Steinberg – art direction, design, photography, cover design
- Ellie Oberzil – design
- Mansfield – sleeve art

== Charts ==
Chart (1977)	Peak position
Swedish Albums (Sverigetopplistan)	47
US Billboard 200	85
