= Jack King (musician) =

American rock drummer

Jack King is an American rock drummer from Pleasant Hill, California. Jack graduated from Pleasant Hill High School in 1966. He was a member of the 1960s psychedelic rock band Frumious Bandersnatch. King wrote the band's only significant 1960s studio release, the song "Hearts to Cry". He later played drums with the Steve Miller Band, playing on their 1973 album The Joker. Steve Miller moved King from drums to rhythm guitar, where Jack is listed as "John" King.

The original members of Frumious Bandersnatch reunited and released an album in 2008.
