= Herbie Herbert =

American music manager and musician (1948–2021)

Walter Herbert
- Also known as: Herbie Herbert
- Born: Walter James Herbert II; February 5, 1948; Berkeley, California, U.S.
- Died: October 25, 2021 (aged 73) Orinda, California, U.S.
- Genres: R&B, soul
- Occupations: Artist manager, promoter, real estate developer, entrepreneur
- Instruments: Lead vocalist, guitar
- Years active: 1966–2021
- Labels: Sy Records

Walter James "Herbie" Herbert II (February 5, 1948 – October 25, 2021) was an American music manager and musician. He was best known for his work with Santana and Journey.

== Early life ==
Herbert was born in Berkeley, California, on February 5, 1948. His family moved to nearby Orinda when he was a child. He attended Campolindo High School and also resided in Lafayette, California and Mendocino County.

== Career ==
Herbert got his start in the music business in 1966. Bud Herbert was dubbed "Herbie " by his partner, Jim Nixon, also known as Oakland Dupree, when they co-managed Frumious Bandersnatch. Jim introduced Herbie to Bill Graham and also secured his position with Santana. Bill then mentored Herbie. Bill Graham, after Stan Marcum, served as the manager of Santana. Herbert then became a roadie for the group, along with the Villanueva brothers John and Jackie (where he met Neal Schon and Gregg Rolie). He had previously co-managed Frumious Bandersnatch (where he met Ross Valory and George Tickner). When Santana imploded in 1973, Herbert put together the original lineup of Journey (consisting of Schon, Rolie, Tickner, Valory and drummer Prairie Prince, who was soon replaced by Aynsley Dunbar) and remained its manager through 1993. Herbert was heavily involved in all business aspects of the band and travelled as their road manager. With a sharp business sense, Herbert brought everything in-house under the name of Nightmare Productions and pioneered the use of large screen videos (via the creation of Nocturne Productions), impressive lighting and sound for stadium-sized concerts. A shrewd businessman, Herbert made a fortune with Journey's real estate holdings, Nocturne Productions, and catalog management. He and Jim Welch, Journey's art director, devised a creative marketing plan to promote the band using artists Stanley Mouse and Alton Kelly, thematic one-worded album titles, and exposure at point-of-purchase outlets. In 1993, then lead vocalist Steve Perry asked that Herbert be replaced due to personality conflicts. By 1995, Irving Azoff was hired by the band to be the next manager.

In addition to his work with Journey, Herbert managed the Steve Miller Band and co-managed Swedish groups Roxette and Europe. He also managed Mr. Big, Enuff Z'Nuff, and Journey offshoots the Storm and Hardline. During the late 1990s, Herbert moved from behind the scenes into the spotlight, recording three albums as Sy Klopps and touring the San Francisco Bay Area with the Sy Klopps Band, which has included current and former Journey band members Schon, Rolie, Prince, and Valory. Herbie, as Sy Klopps, sang lead in the Trichromes, a band featuring Bill Kreutzmann, Ralph Woodson, Steve Kimock and Ira Walker. Trichromes were managed by Herbie's long time pal Steve Parish of the Grateful Dead.

== Personal life ==
Herbert was married to Maya Herbert for 20 years until his death. Together, they had two children: Katherine and Seaya.

Herbert died on October 25, 2021, at his home in Orinda. He was 73, and suffered from an unspecified "prolonged illness" prior to his death.
