= Bonaroo (band) =

American pop rock band

- Origin: United States
- Genres: Pop rock
- Years active: 1974–1975
- Labels: Wounded Bird, Warner Bros.
- Past members: Bobby Winkelman; Bill Cuomo; Michael Hossack; Robert Lichtig; Jerry Weems

Bonaroo was an American pop rock band which ran 1974-1975 featuring Bobby Winkelman, guitar, vocal and songwriter; Bill Cuomo, keyboards, vocal; Michael Hossack, drums; Robert Lichtig, bass, vocal; and Jerry Weems, guitar, vocal. They took part in the Warner Brothers Music Show tour in 1975—along with Tower of Power, Montrose, Little Feat, Graham Central Station and The Doobie Brothers—and issued four singles and one album, Bonaroo (Warner Brothers Wounded Bird Records). Winkelman went on to record Bonaroo II as a solo project.
