= Bobby Winkelman =

American singer and song writer (1948–2023)

Robert "Bobby" Winkelman (January 26, 1948 – December 26, 2023) was an American singer, songwriter, guitarist, and bassist.

== Career ==
He was a founding member of the East Bay band The Epics, based in Walnut Creek, in 1966 to mid 1967. The Epics were Bobby Winkelman, Nino Rugirello, Ed Flickenger, Ric Oxley, and Jimmy Fulton. At age 17, the band released its AM hit single record, with its side A, "Humpty Dumpty", and side B, "Homesick", on radio station KFRC, in 1966.

In 1967, he became a founding member of psychedelic rock band Frumious Bandersnatch. While together, the band released only a three-song EP in 1968 before splitting a year later. Winkelman's unreleased recordings with the band would later be compiled on the A Young Man's Song (1996) and Golden Sons of Libra (2003) albums.

He later became a performing, recording member in the Steve Miller Band, for which he wrote, sang, and played his original song, "Good Morning", as well as other album tracks that appeared on their 1970 album Steve Miller Band Number 5, on Capitol Records. He also played and sang on Miller's 1972 Anthology album.

In 1975, Bobby got a solo record deal with Warner Bros. Record Company, and they released his album with Bonaroo, Bonaroo, with his original songs, "Life's Sweet Song", "Dream On", Melody Maker", "Spirit of a Dead Man", "I See the Light" and "Let's Go Down to the River".

In 1977, he contributed a co-authored song titled, "My Own Space", with lyrics by Jason Cooper, to the Steve Miller Book Of Dreams album.

In 1995, Bobby, as a record producer and music publisher of the band, Frumious Bandersnatch, released Nuggets From The Golden State: The Berkeley EP's", on the Big Beat Records label.

In 1996, Big Beat Records released Frumious Bandersnatch's A Young Man's Song, containing: Jack King's' "Hearts to Cry", Bobby Winkelman's "Chain Reaction", and "Misty Cloudy", with Jack King's, and George Tickner's "Cheshire". Bobby self produced & released his Bonaroo II CD, which included his original songs: "Nobody Asked Me", "We Can Move", "Magic Spell", "When You Touch My Hand" (lyrics by Linda Wallimann), "Where Ships Come Sailing By", and a new version of "Spirit of A Dead Man". The title track was called "Children of the Stars". That CD also contains "Old Glory" and "Be Here Now" with piano and organ performed by Nicky Hopkins of the Rolling Stones, for his keyboard work on their original song entitled "You Can't Always Get What You Want". Lastly, "Off Again On Again Love", according to the label, is actually another original song entitled, "Rainbows (The Phantom Messenger)".

In 2002, Bobby and Alec Palao produced a full-length re-issued LP album entitled Frumious Bandersnatch: Golden Sons Of Libra (The Studio Outtakes), which quickly became a collector's item after it was released by Get Back Records.

Bobby's song "Humpty Dumpty" was re-released in 2007, on the Big Beat Record label, on You Got Yours! East Bay Garage 1965-1967 CDWIKD 268. "Hearts to Cry", was re-released, after it was released by the band back in 1967, on their clear purple, transparent, 33 1/3, four-song, LP album published by R. P. Winkelman Tunes. The song was originally penned and lead-sung by the band's original drummer, Jack King.

The song appeared again on, Love Is The Song We Sing (San Francisco Nuggets) on Rhino Records. The package included a four-CD, 65 song set, inside its 64-page book, photographed and illustrated in full color, and chronicling the "flower power" years of the San Francisco bay area music scene from 1965 through 1970.
