= Journey (Journey album) =

1975 studio and debut album by Journey

Studio album by Journey
- Released: April 1, 1975
- Recorded: November 1974
- Studios: CBS Studios, San Francisco, California
- Genres: Progressive rock; jazz rock
- Length: 36:57
- Label: Columbia
- Producer: Roy Halee

Journey chronology
| Journey (1975) | Look into the Future (1976) |

Singles from Journey
- 1. "To Play Some Music" Released: June 1975

Professional ratings
Review scores
| Source | Rating |
|---|---|
| AllMusic | 2/5 stars |
| Collector's Guide to Heavy Metal | 5/10 |
| Rolling Stone | (favorable) |

Journey is the debut studio album by the American rock band Journey. It was released on April 1, 1975, by Columbia Records. Unlike their later recordings, this is primarily a progressive rock album which focuses mainly on the band's instrumental talents. It is the only album to include rhythm guitarist George Tickner among their lineup.

Journey recorded a demo album prior to the release of Journey, with the same songs in different order and with Prairie Prince as the drummer. There were additional tracks, including instrumental pieces, that did not make it to the final product, including the original title track of the demo album, "Charge of the Light Brigade".

== Track listing ==
Side one
| No. | Title | Writer(s) | Length |
|---|---|---|---|
| 1. | "Of a Lifetime" | Gregg Rolie; George Tickner; Neal Schon | 6:54 |
| 2. | "In the Morning Day" | Rolie; Ross Valory | 4:27 |
| 3. | "Kohoutek" (instrumental) | Rolie; Schon | 6:46 |

Side two
| No. | Title | Writer(s) | Length |
|---|---|---|---|
| 4. | "To Play Some Music" | Rolie; Schon | 3:19 |
| 5. | "Topaz" (instrumental) | Tickner | 6:12 |
| 6. | "In My Lonely Feeling / Conversations" | Rolie; R. Valory | 5:01 |
| 7. | "Mystery Mountain" | Rolie; Tickner; Diane Valory | 4:23 |
| Total length: | | | 36:57 |

== Personnel ==
Journey

- Gregg Rolie – lead vocals, keyboards
- Neal Schon – lead guitar, vocals
- George Tickner – rhythm guitar
- Ross Valory – bass guitar, piano, vocals
- Aynsley Dunbar – drums

Production

- Roy Halee – producer, engineer
- Mark Friedman – recording
- George Horn – mastering at CBS Studios, San Francisco
- Nancy Donald – art direction
- Steven Silverstein – photography

== Charts ==
| Chart (1975) | Peak position |
|---|---|
| Japanese Albums (Oricon) | 72 |
| US Billboard 200 | 138 |

== See also ==
- Comet Kohoutek
