= Frumious Bandersnatch =

American psychedelic rock band

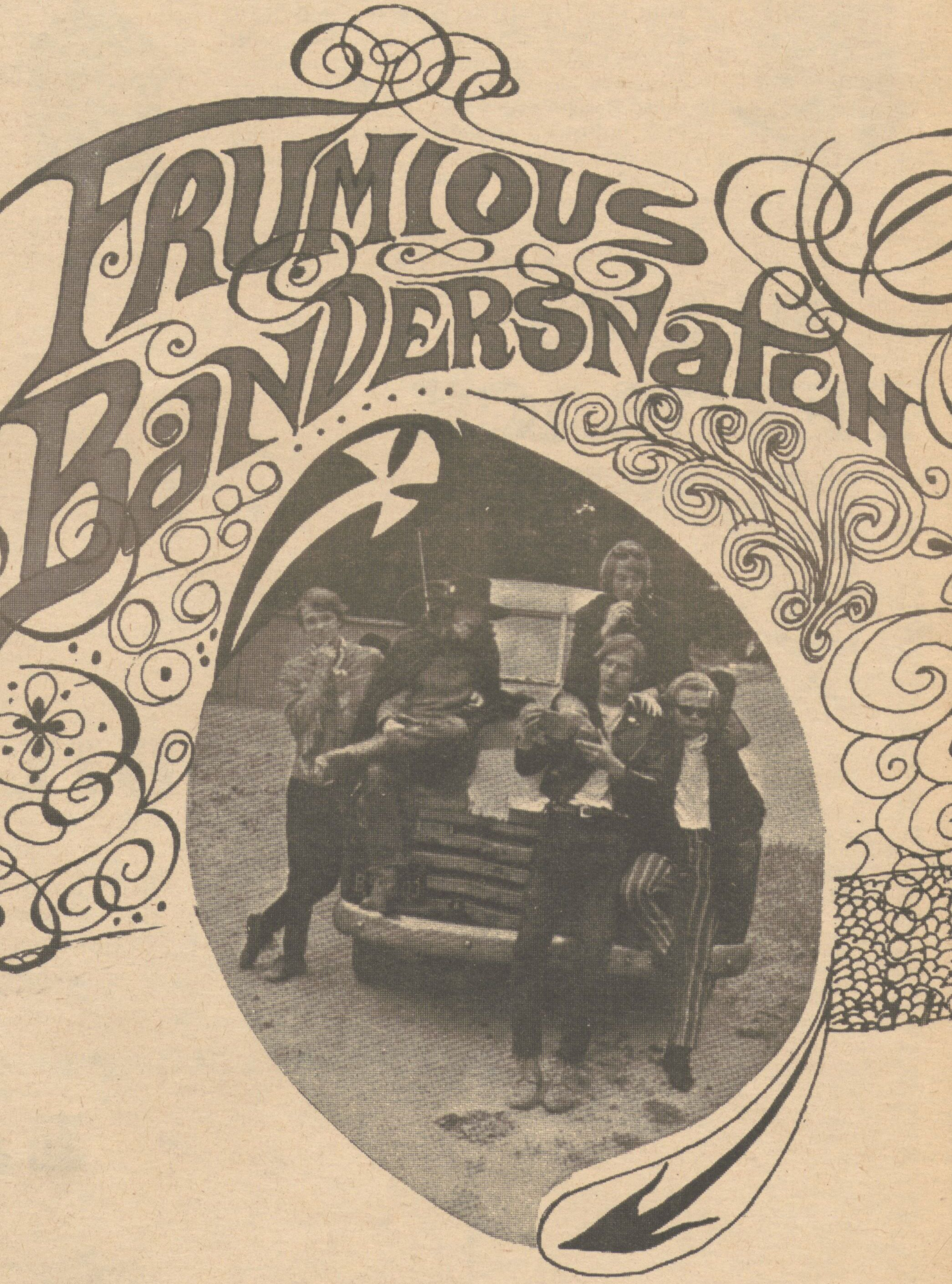
- Frumious Bandersnatch, 1968

Background information
- Origin: San Francisco, California, U.S.
- Genres: Psychedelic rock
- Years active: 1967–1969
- Label: Columbia
- Past members: David Denny; Jack King; George Tickner; Ross Valory; Bobby Winkelman; Bret Willmott

Frumious Bandersnatch was an American psychedelic rock band active in the 1960s. It was named after a character from the Lewis Carroll poem "Jabberwocky". Based in Berkeley, California, the band was active from 1967 to 1969. Their initial three-song EP produced a minor underground hit with the song "Hearts to Cry". A recording of their live work, titled A Young Man's Song, was released in 1996 by Big Beat (UK).

== Career ==
The band was formed across the bay from San Francisco in Contra Costa County, and changed personnel several times. Despite interest from several record companies, the band's only release was a three-song EP on their own label, pressed in a quantity of 1,000 and distributed locally.

Four members of Frumious Bandersnatch (Bobby Winkelman, Jack King, Ross Valory, and David Denny) became regular members of the Steve Miller Band. Valory, along with fellow Frumious Bandersnatch member George Tickner and manager Herbie Herbert, joined former Santana members Neal Schon and Gregg Rolie to form the band Journey in 1973.

== Members ==
- David Denny – guitar
- Jack King – drums
- George Tickner – guitar
- Ross Valory – bass
- Bobby Winkelman – rhythm guitar, bass
- Bret Willmott – guitar
- Jimmy Warner – guitar, vocals
- Brian Hough
- Jack Notestein

== Discography ==
- 1968 – Frumious Bandersnatch EP; self-produced
- 1995 – The Berkeley EP's (compilation, three songs featured); Big Beat UK
- 1996 – A Young Man's Song; Big Beat UK
- 2003 – Golden Songs of Libra, Get Back
- 2007 – Love Is the Song We Sing: San Francisco Nuggets 1965–1970 (compilation, feat. "Hearts to Cry"); Rhino Records
