= Look into the Future =

Studio album by Journey
- Released: January 1976
- Recorded: August–October 1975
- Studios: CBS Studios, San Francisco
- Genres: Progressive rock; hard rock
- Length: 41:41
- Label: Columbia
- Producers: Journey and Glen Kolotkin

Journey chronology
| Journey (1975) | Look into the Future (1976) | Next (1977) |

Singles from Look into the Future
- 1. "On a Saturday Nite" Released: March 1976; 2. "She Makes Me (Feel Alright)" Released: July 23, 1976

Professional ratings
Review scores
| Source | Rating |
|---|---|
| AllMusic | 2/5 stars |
| Collector's Guide to Heavy Metal | 5/10 |

Look into the Future is the second studio album by the American rock band Journey. It was released in January 1976 by Columbia Records.

For their second album, the members of Journey toned down the overt progressiveness of their first, self-titled release, in favor of a more focused approach. Despite that, Look into the Future still retains some of the experimental approach and sound of the debut, especially in the title track and "I'm Gonna Leave You". The album also features a cover version of The Beatles' "It's All Too Much" from the 1968 Yellow Submarine film and 1969 soundtrack. The title track is the longest recorded Journey song.

Rhythm guitarist George Tickner left the band after having co-written two songs for this album, leaving members Gregg Rolie (keyboards/lead vocals), Neal Schon (guitar), Ross Valory (bass) and Aynsley Dunbar (drums).

== Track listing ==
Side one
| No. | Title | Lyrics | Music | Length |
|---|---|---|---|---|
| 1. | "On a Saturday Nite" | Gregg Rolie | Rolie | 3:59 |
| 2. | "It's All Too Much" (The Beatles cover) | George Harrison | Harrison | 4:03 |
| 3. | "Anyway" | Rolie | Rolie | 4:11 |
| 4. | "She Makes Me (Feel Alright)" | Rolie; Alex Cash | Neal Schon | 3:12 |
| 5. | "You're on Your Own" | Rolie | Schon; George Tickner | 5:53 |

Side two
| No. | Title | Lyrics | Music | Length |
|---|---|---|---|---|
| 6. | "Look into the Future" | Rolie; Diane Valory | Schon | 8:10 |
| 7. | "Midnight Dreamer" | Rolie | Schon | 5:13 |
| 8. | "I'm Gonna Leave You" | Rolie | Schon; Rolie; Tickner | 7:00 |
| Total length: | | | | 41:41 |

== Personnel ==
Journey

- Gregg Rolie – keyboards, lead vocals
- Neal Schon – guitar, backing vocals
- Ross Valory – bass guitar, backing vocals
- Aynsley Dunbar – drums, percussion

Production

- Glen Kolotkin – co-producer, engineer
- Mark Friedman – engineer
- George Horn – mastering
- Rick Narin – artwork
- Ethan Russell – photography

== Charts ==
| Chart (1976) | Peak position |
|---|---|
| Japanese Albums (Oricon) | 58 |
| US Billboard 200 | 100 |
