= Lists of deaths in popular music =

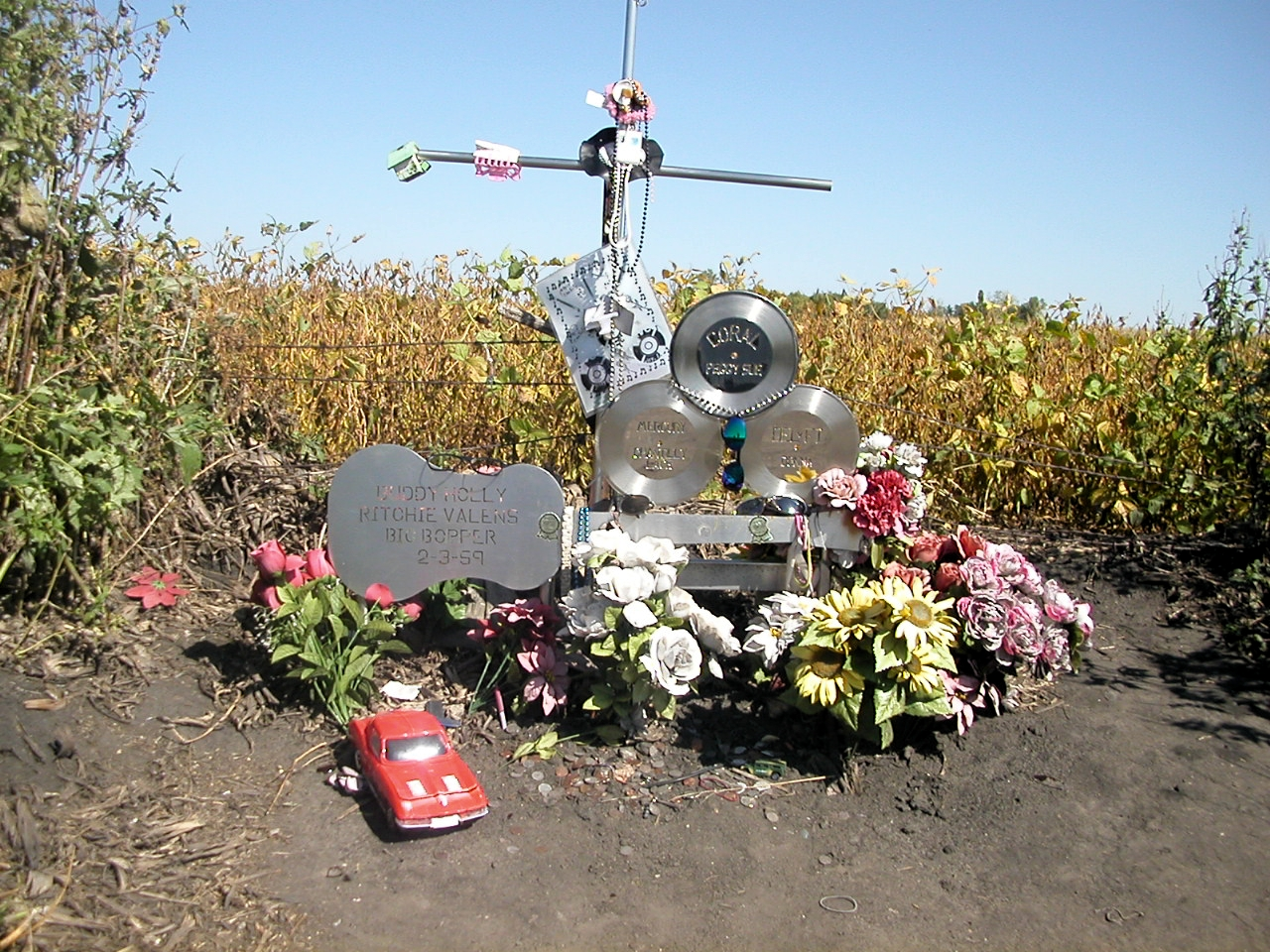
Monument at the crash site of the airplane carrying Buddy Holly, The Big Bopper, and Ritchie Valens; "The Day the Music Died".

The following is a list of notable performers of rock and roll music or rock music, and others directly associated with the music as producers, songwriters or in other closely related roles, who have died. The list gives their date, cause and location of death, and their age.

Rock music developed from the rock and roll music that emerged during the 1950s, and includes a diverse range of subgenres. The terms "rock and roll" and "rock" each have a variety of definitions, some narrow and some wider. In determining criteria for inclusion, this list uses as its basis reliable sources listing "rock deaths" or "deaths in rock and roll", as well as such sources as the Rock and Roll Hall of Fame.

== See also ==
- 27 Club
- List of pop musicians who died of drug overdose
- List of murdered musicians
- List of murdered hip hop musicians
