= George Tickner =

American rock musician (1946–2023)

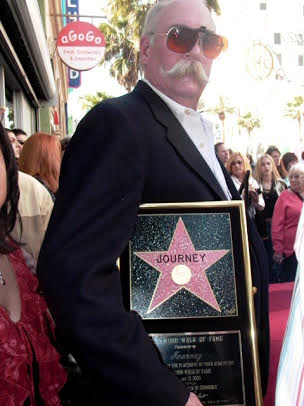
- Tickner in 2005

Background information
- Born: George Tyndall Tickner; September 8, 1946; Syracuse, New York, U.S.
- Died: July 5, 2023 (aged 76)
- Genre: Hard rock
- Occupation: Guitarist
- Years active: 1967–2023
- Label: Frontiers Records
- Formerly of: Journey; Frumious Bandersnatch; Jerry Garcia

George Tyndall Tickner (September 8, 1946 – July 5, 2023) was an American rock musician who played rhythm guitar and co-wrote songs as a founding member of Journey.

== Biography ==
Prior to joining Journey, Tickner was a member of the San Francisco psychedelic rock band Frumious Bandersnatch, along with fellow Journey founder Ross Valory.

In 1973, Tickner was in the lineup for a number of performances by Jerry Garcia and Merl Saunders' band.

After the release of Journey's debut album, he left the band to attend Stanford Medical School on a full scholarship. Upon Tickner's departure, Journey lead guitarist Neal Schon took over all of the band's guitar duties, until Jonathan Cain (keyboards/rhythm guitar) joined in 1981.

After leaving Journey, Tickner maintained an active interest in music, as well as contacts with his former bandmates. He and Ross Valory created The Hive, a recording studio where he continued to write and compose music. Tickner, Valory and keyboardist Stevie 'Keys' Roseman came together to form the band VTR, releasing an album called Cinema, which featured other present and former members of Journey, such as Schon, Steve Smith, and Prairie Prince.

In January 2005, Tickner appeared with past and present members of the band Journey to receive a star on the Hollywood Walk of Fame.

Tickner died on July 5, 2023, at the age of 76.

== Discography ==
=== With Frumious Bandersnatch ===
- A Young Man's Song (1996)

=== With Faun ===
- Faun (1972)

=== With Journey ===
- Journey (1975) (performer and co-writer of three songs)
- Look into the Future (1976) (co-writer of two songs)
- Next (1977) (co-writer of one song)

=== Solo/collaborative works ===
- VTR – Cinema (2005)
