= Jabberwocky sentence =

Sentences that do not make sense

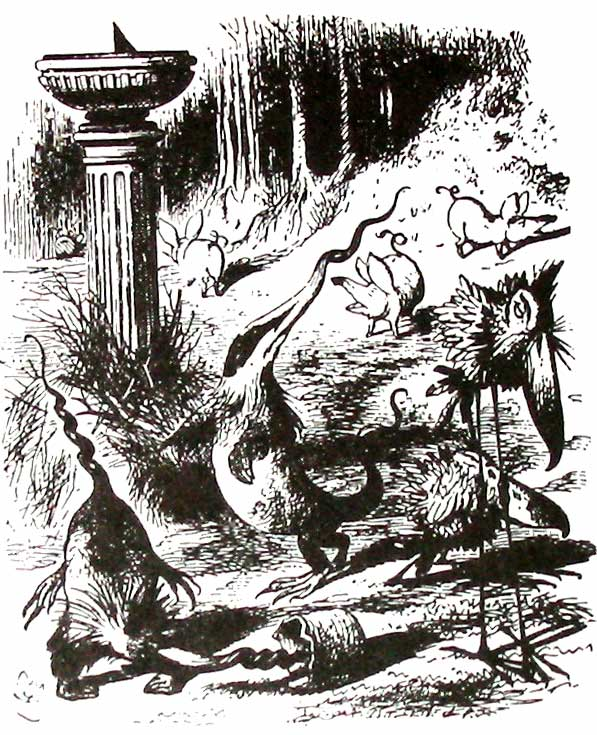
Twas brilig, and the slithy toves Did gyre and gimble in the wabe; All mimsy were the borogoves, And the mome raths outgrabe.

A Jabberwocky sentence is a type of sentence of interest in neurolinguistics. Jabberwocky sentences take their name from the language of Lewis Carroll's well-known poem "Jabberwocky". In the poem, Carroll uses correct English grammar and syntax, but many of the words are made up and merely suggest meaning. A Jabberwocky sentence is therefore a sentence which uses correct grammar and syntax but contains nonsense words, rendering it semantically meaningless.

== Interest in neurolinguistics ==
Jabberwocky sentences are of interest in the field of neurolinguistics, because they allow for the study of syntactic processing in the absence of semantic content. A study by Hahne and Jescheniak (2001) demonstrated that test subjects presented with blocks of Jabberwocky sentence trials and blocks of regular sentence trials at least one week apart demonstrated an early left anterior negativity or N150 in the event-related potential recording upon encountering a phrase structure violation in either type of sentence. The N150 was followed by a P600, indicating an attempted reinterpretation of the sentence by the brain. While the N150 is expected in the presence of phrase structure violation in normal sentences, in a Jabberwocky sentence, it indicates the processing of morpho-syntactical structure in the absence of lexical semantic content. This implies the existence of a syntactic pattern recognizer, which would interpret word class based on inflectional morphology and word order. A second study by Silva-Pereyra et al. showed that preschoolers at the age of 36 months demonstrate similar processing patterns compared to adults when processing normal sentences with phrase structure violations, showing ERP activity analogous to the N150 and P600 in adults, but shifted later in time. When presented with phrase-structure violations in Jabberwocky sentences, however, preschoolers demonstrate activity analogous to a N400, typically associated with the extraction of meaning from words in adults, along with a diminished P600. This implies that semantics plays a role in syntactic processing in children and provides neurobiological evidence for interactive theories over modular theories of semantic and syntactic processing.

Another study in by Yamada and Neville (2007) examined the differences between brain activity elicited with grammatical and "ungrammatical" English sentences (sentences that contain actual words but have a grammar error) and with grammatical and ungrammatical Jabberwocky sentences. It was found that in both English and Jabberwocky sentences, a negativity was elicited when a syntactic violation (grammar mistake) was made, but the activity was more anterior in the case of the English sentence. They found that differences in activity between grammatical and ungrammatical sentences were more focused toward the front and right hemispheres for English sentences, but was evenly distributed throughout all sites for Jabberwocky sentences.

A study conducted by Bonhage, Mueller, Friederici, and Fiebach (2015) concluded that Jabberwocky sentences elicit a different neurological response than normal sentences. Specifically, Jabberwocky sentences elicited activity from structures in the left hemisphere of the brain, in contrast with normal sentences which mainly elicit activity in the right hemisphere of the brain.

== See also ==
- Gostak
- Colorless green ideas sleep furiously
- Word salad
