= Nonce word =

Lexeme created for a single occasion

In linguistics, a nonce word—also called an occasionalism—is any word (lexeme), or any sequence of sounds or letters, created for a single occasion or utterance but not otherwise understood or recognized as a word in a given language. Nonce words have a variety of functions and are most commonly used for humor, poetry, children's literature, linguistic experiments, psychological studies, and medical diagnoses, or they arise by accident.

Some nonce words have a meaning at their inception or gradually acquire a fixed meaning inferred from context and use, but if they eventually become an established part of the language (neologisms), they stop being nonce words. Other nonce words may be essentially meaningless and disposable (nonsense words), but they are useful for exactly that reason—the words wug and blicket for instance were invented by researchers to be used in child language testing. Nonsense words often share orthographic and phonetic similarity with (meaningful) words, as is the case with pseudowords, which make no sense but can still be pronounced in accordance with a language's phonotactic rules. Such invented words are used by psychology and linguistics researchers and educators as tools to assess a learner's phonetic decoding ability, and the ability to infer the (hypothetical) meaning of a nonsense word from context is used to test for brain damage. Proper names of real or fictional entities sometimes originate as nonce words.

The term is used because such a word is created "for the nonce" (i.e., for the time being, or this once), coming from James Murray, editor of the Oxford English Dictionary. Some analyses consider nonce words to fall broadly under neologisms, which are usually defined as words relatively recently accepted into a language's vocabulary; other analyses do not.

== Types of nonce words ==
A variety of more specific concepts used by scholars falls under the umbrella of nonce words, of which overlap is also sometimes possible:

- nonsense word: a nonce word that is meaningless unless it follows the phonology of a particular language
  - nonword: a nonsense word that is not pronounceable in a particular language
  - pseudoword: a nonsense word that still follows the phonotactics of a particular language and is therefore pronounceable, feeling to native speakers like a possible word (for example, in English, blurk is a pseudoword, but bldzkg is a nonword); thus, pseudowords follow a language's phonological rules but have no meaning
- ghost word: a nonce word authoritatively described in a reference work that turns out to have originated from a typo or other simple error
- protologism: a nonce word that has achieved repeated usage, perhaps even by a small group but not beyond that (an intermediate step towards a neologism)
- stunt word: a nonce word intentionally coined to demonstrate the creator's cleverness or elicit an emotional reaction, such as admiration or laughter; such words are often noted in the works of Dr. Seuss, as in "Sometimes I am quite certain there's a Jertain in the curtain", in which the one-time use of Jertain refers to some unspecified fictional creature purely invented to create a whimsical rhyme with certain and curtain

=== Similar or related concepts ===
Many types of other words can also be meaningful nonce words, as is true of most sniglets (words, often stunt words, explicitly coined in the absence of any relevant dictionary word). Other types of misinterpretations or humorous re-wordings can also be nonce words, as may occur in word play, such as certain examples of puns, spoonerisms, malapropisms, etc. Furthermore, meaningless nonce words can occur unintentionally or spontaneously, for instance through errors (typographical or otherwise) or through keysmashes.

== In child development studies ==
Nonce words are sometimes used to study the development of language in children, because they allow researchers to test how children treat words of which they have no prior knowledge. This permits inferences about the default assumptions children make about new word meanings, syntactic structure, etc. "Wug" is among the earliest known nonce words used in language learning studies, and is best known for its use in Jean Berko's "Wug test", in which children were presented with a novel object, called a wug, and then shown multiple instances of the object and asked to complete a sentence that elicits a plural form—e.g., "This is a wug. Now there are two of them. There are two...?" The use of the plural form "wugs" by the children suggests that they have applied a plural rule to the form, and that this knowledge is not specific to prior experience with the word but applies to most English nouns, whether familiar or novel.

Nancy N. Soja, Susan Carey, and Elizabeth Spelke used "blicket", "stad", "mell", "coodle", "doff", "tannin", "fitch", and "tulver" as nonce words when testing to see if children's knowledge of the distinction between non-solid substances and solid objects preceded or followed their knowledge of the distinction between mass nouns and count nouns.

== In literature ==
- A poem by Seamus Heaney titled "Nonce Words" is included in his collection District and Circle.
- David Crystal reported fluddle, which he understood to mean a water spillage between a puddle and a flood, invented by the speaker as a portmanteau word because no suitable word existed. Crystal speculated in 1995 that it might enter the English language if it proved popular.
- Bouba and kiki are used to demonstrate a connection between the sound of a word and its meaning.
- Grok, coined by Robert Heinlein in Stranger in a Strange Land, is now used by many to mean "to deeply and intuitively understand".
- The poem "Jabberwocky" by Lewis Carroll is full of nonce words, of which two, chortle and galumph, have entered into common use.
- The novel Finnegans Wake by James Joyce used quark ("three quarks for Muster Mark") as a nonce word; the physicist Murray Gell-Mann adopted it as the name of a subatomic particle.

== See also ==
- Hapax legomenon
- Literary nonsense
- Metasyntactic variable
- Placeholder name
- Pseudoword
- Sniglet

=== Examples of nonce-word articles ===
- Foobar
- Glokaya kuzdra
- Gostak
- Jabberwocky
- Pompatus
- Protologism
- Runcible
- Supercalifragilisticexpialidocious
- Lorem Ipsum
