= Pompatus =

Nonce word

Pompatus (or Pompitus) (/ˈpɒmpətəs/) is a nonce word coined by Steve Miller in his song “Enter Maurice” (1972).

== Etymology ==
The word is probably a corruption of—or imagined variation on—the word puppetutes, which was itself a coinage, originated by Vernon Green at the age of 14. Green included the word puppetutes in the lyrics of doo-wop song "The Letter" (1954), as performed by him and The Medallions. "The Letter" also included another original coinage, pismotality. Presumably in homage to the Medallions' song, Steve Miller used the nonce words epismetology and pompatus in the lyrics of two of his other songs, "Enter Maurice" and "The Conversation", one of which is, like "The Letter", in spoken-word style.

== Lyrics ==
The lyrics of "The Joker" include the quatrain:

Some people call me the space cowboy.
Yeah! Some call me the gangster of love.
Some people call me Maurice,
'Cause I speak of the pompatus of love.

Each line references a track on a previous Miller album: "Space Cowboy" on Brave New World (1969); "Gangster of Love" on Sailor (1968); and "Enter Maurice" on Recall the Beginning...A Journey from Eden (1972), which includes the lines:

My dearest darling, come closer to Maurice
so I can whisper sweet words of epismetology
in your ear and speak to you of the pompatus of love.

Although Miller claims he invented the words epismetology (a metathesis of the word epistemology) and pompatus, both are variants of words which Miller most likely heard in a song by Vernon Green called "The Letter," which was recorded by the Los Angeles doo-wop group The Medallions in 1954.

Green's "The Letter" as performed by the Medallions had the lines:

Oh my darling, let me whisper
sweet words of pizmotality
and discuss the puppetutes of love.

Green describes the lyrics as a description of his dream woman. "Pizmotality described words of such secrecy that they could only be spoken to the one you loved", Green explained. He coined the term puppetutes "to mean a secret paper-doll fantasy figure who would be my everything and bear my children".

In 2019, Miller appeared on The Tonight Show Starring Jimmy Fallon and explained that the word pompatus came from "an old doo-wop song" that included a term he misunderstood as pompatus, and said that for years he did not know what it meant whenever someone asked him about it.

== Pompatus in pop culture ==
Because of its peculiarity, the word pompatus has secured a niche in 20th century pop culture. Wolfman Jack frequently referenced the phrase and there is a sound clip of him using the line within the song "Clap for the Wolfman" by The Guess Who. The Pompatus of Love, a 1996 film starring Jon Cryer, featured four men discussing a number of assorted themes, including attempts to determine the meaning of the phrase. Jon Cryer was also a writer of the film, and describes finding out the meaning of the phrase during a phone call with Vernon Green in his autobiography "So That Happened" in chapter 22, page 217.

Humor columnist Dave Barry frequently refers to the song line as a source of comedic value, particularly in his 1997 book Dave Barry's Book of Bad Songs. Pompatus is used by Michael Ondaatje in his 2001 book Anil's Ghost. Stephen King uses the word in his 2006 novel Lisey's Story. Tim Dorsey uses the word in his 2010 novel, Gator a-Go-Go. It was the subject of the October 9, 2011 Over the Hedge comic strip.
