= Colorless green ideas sleep furiously =

Syntactically well-formed, semantically incongruous phrase

Approximate X-bar representation of Colorless green ideas sleep furiously. See Phrase structure rules.

Colorless green ideas sleep furiously is a sentence composed by Noam Chomsky as an example of a sentence that is grammatically well-formed, but semantically nonsensical. The sentence was originally used in his 1955 thesis The Logical Structure of Linguistic Theory and also appears in his 1956 paper "Three Models for the Description of Language" and his 1957 book Syntactic Structures. There is no obvious understandable meaning that can be derived from it, which demonstrates the distinction between syntax and semantics, and the idea that a syntactically well-formed sentence is not guaranteed to also be semantically well-formed. As an example of a category mistake, it was intended to show the inadequacy of certain probabilistic models of grammar, and the need for more structured models.

== Senseless but grammatical ==
Chomsky wrote in his 1957 book Syntactic Structures:

1. Colorless green ideas sleep furiously.
2. *Furiously sleep ideas green colorless. (Note: In linguistics, an asterisk is used to denote a string of words that is ungrammatical.)

It is fair to assume that neither sentence (1) nor (2) had ever previously occurred in an English discourse. Hence, in any statistical model that accounts for grammaticality, these sentences will be ruled out on identical grounds as equally "remote" from English. Yet (1), though nonsensical, is grammatical, while (2) is not grammatical.

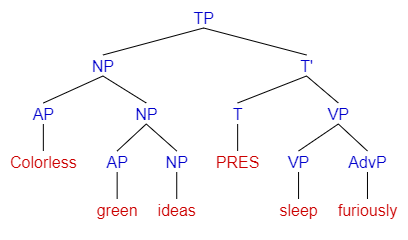
Approximate representation of "Colorless green ideas sleep furiously". See Minimalist program.

Colorless green ideas – which functions as the subject of the sentence – is an anomalous string for at least two reasons:

- The adjective colorless can be understood as dull, uninteresting, or lacking in color, and so when it combines with the adjective green, this is nonsensical: an object cannot simultaneously lack color and have the color of green.
- In the phrase colorless green ideas the abstract noun idea is described as being colorless and green. However, due to its abstract nature, an idea cannot have or lack color.

Sleep furiously – which functions as the predicate of the sentence – is structurally well-formed; in other words, it is grammatical. However, the meaning that it expresses is peculiar, as the activity of sleeping is not generally taken to be something that can be done in a furious fashion. Nevertheless, sleep furiously is both grammatical and interpretable, though its interpretation is unusual.

Combining Colorless green ideas with sleep furiously creates a sentence that some believe to be nonsensical. On the one hand, an abstract noun like idea is taken to not have the ability to engage in an activity like sleeping. On the other hand, some think it possible for an idea to sleep.

Linguists account for the unusual nature of this sentence by distinguishing two types of selection: semantic selection (s-selection) and categorical selection (c-selection). Relative to s-selection, the sentence is semantically anomalous – senseless – for three reasons:

- The s-selection of the adjective colorless is violated because it can only describe objects that lack color.
- The s-selection of the adverb furiously is violated because it can only describe activity that is compatible with angry action, and such meanings are generally incompatible with the activity of sleeping.
- The s-selection of the verb sleep is violated because it can occur only with subjects that can engage in sleep.

However, relative to c-selection, the sentence is structurally well-formed:

- The c-selection of the adverb furiously is satisfied, as it combines with the verb sleep, satisfying the requirement that an adverb modifies a verb.
- The c-selection of the adjectives colorless and green are satisfied as they combine with noun idea, satisfying the requirement that an adjective modifies a noun.
- The c-selection of the intransitive verb sleep is satisfied as it combines with the subject colorless green ideas, satisfying the requirement that an intransitive verb combines with a subject.

This leads to the conclusion that although meaningless, the structural integrity of this sentence is high.

== Attempts at meaningful interpretations ==
=== Polysemy ===
The mechanism of polysemy – where a word has multiple meanings – can be used to create an interpretation for an otherwise nonsensical sentence. For example, the adjectives green and colorless both have figurative meanings. Green has a wide range of figurative meanings, including "immature", "pertaining to environmental consciousness", "newly formed", and "naive". And colorless can be interpreted as "nondescript". Likewise the verb sleep can have the figurative meaning of "being in dormant state", and the adverb furiously can have the figurative meaning "to do an action violently or quickly".

- figurative meanings of colorless: nondescript, unseen, drab
- figurative meanings of green: immature, pertaining to environmental consciousness, newly formed, naive, jealous
- figurative meanings of sleep: be in a dormant state
- figurative meanings of furiously: to do an action quickly, vigorously, intensely, energetically or violently

When these figurative meanings are taken into account the sentence Colorless green ideas sleep furiously can have legitimate meaning, with less oblique semantics, and so is compatible with the following interpretations:

1. Colorless green ideas sleep furiously. = "Nondescript immature ideas have violent nightmares."
2. Colorless green ideas sleep furiously. = "Naive ideas that have not yet attained their full scope can cause a mind to race even while it attempts to rest."
3. Colorless green ideas sleep furiously. = "Suppressed envious ideas lie dormant, though the negative feelings intensify."

=== In popular culture ===
Chomsky's "colorless green" inspired written works, which all try to create meaning from the semantically meaningless utterance through added context. In 1958, linguist and anthropologist Dell Hymes presented his work to show that nonsense words can develop into something meaningful when in the right sequence.

Hued ideas mock the brain,
Notions of color not yet color,
Of pure, touchless, branching pallor
Of invading, essential Green

— Dell Hymes, 1958

Russian-American linguist and literary theorist Roman Jakobson (1959) interpreted "colorless green" as a pale green, and "sleep furiously" as the wildness of "a state-like sleep, as that of inertness, torpidity, numbness." Jakobson gave the example that if "[someone's] hatred never slept, why then, cannot someone's ideas fall into sleep?" John Hollander, an American poet and literary critic, argued that the sentence operates in a vacuum as it is without context. He went on to write a poem based on that idea, entitled Coiled Alizarine that was included in his book, The Night Mirror (1971).

Curiously deep, the slumber of crimson thoughts:
While breathless, in stodgy viridian
Colorless green ideas sleep furiously.

— John Hollander, 1971

Years later, Hollander contacted Chomsky about whether the color choice of 'green' was intentional; however, Chomsky denied any intentions or influences, especially the hypothesized influence from Andrew Marvell's lines from "The Garden" (1681).

"Annihilating all that's made / To a green thought in a green shade"

One of the first writers to have attempted to provide the sentence meaning through context is Chinese linguist Yuen Ren Chao (1997). Chao's poem, entitled Making Sense Out of Nonsense: The Story of My Friend Whose "Colorless Green Ideas Sleep Furiously" (after Noam Chomsky) was published in 1971. This poem attempts to explain what "colorless green ideas" are and how they are able to "sleep furiously". Chao interprets "colorless" as plain, "green" as unripened, and "sleep furiously" as putting the ideas to rest; sleeping on them overnight whilst having internal conflict with these ideas.

I have a friend who is always full of ideas, good ideas and bad ideas, fine ideas and crude ideas, old ideas and new ideas. Before putting his new ideas into practice, he usually sleeps over them to let them mature and ripen. However, when he is in a hurry, he sometimes puts his ideas into practice before they are quite ripe, in other words, while they are still green. Some of his green ideas are quite lively and colorful, but not always, some being quite plain and colorless. When he remembers that some of his colorless ideas are still too green to use, he will sleep over them, or let them sleep, as he puts it. But some of those ideas may be mutually conflicting and contradictory and when they sleep together in the same night they get into furious fights and turn the sleep into a nightmare. Thus my friend often complains that his colorless green ideas sleep furiously.

British linguist Angus McIntosh was unable to accept that Chomsky's utterance was entirely meaningless because to him, "colorless green ideas may well sleep furiously". As if to prove that the sentences are in fact meaningful, McIntosh wrote two poems influenced by Chomsky's utterance, one of which was entitled Nightmare I.

Tortured my mind's eye at its small peephole
sees through the virid glass
the endless ghostly oscillographic stream
Furiously sleep ideas green colorless
Madly awake am I at my small window

— Angus McIntosh, 1961

=== Stanford 1985 competition ===
In 1985, a literary competition was held at Stanford University in which the contestants were invited to make Chomsky's sentence meaningful using not more than 100 words of prose or 14 lines of verse. An example entry from the competition, by C. M. Street, is:

It can only be the thought of verdure to come, which prompts us in the autumn to buy these dormant white lumps of vegetable matter covered by a brown papery skin, and lovingly to plant them and care for them. It is a marvel to me that under this cover they are labouring unseen at such a rate within to give us the sudden awesome beauty of spring flowering bulbs. While winter reigns the earth reposes but these colourless green ideas sleep furiously.

=== Experimental usage ===
Research has been done by implementing this into conversations on text. Research led by Bruno Galantucci at Yeshiva University has implemented the meaningless sentence into real conversations to test reactions. They ran 30 conversations with 1 male and 1 female slipping "colorless green ideas sleep furiously" eight minutes into the conversation during silence. After the conversation, the experimenters did a post-conversation questionnaire, mainly asking if they thought the conversation was unusual. Galantucci concluded that there was a trend of insensitivity to conversational coherence.

There are two general theories that were garnered from this experiment. The first theory is that people tend to ignore the inconsistency of speech to protect the quality of the conversation. In particular, face-to-face conversation has a 33% lower detection rate of nonsensical sentences than online messaging. The authors further explain how humans often disregard some contents of every conversation. The second theory the authors deduced is that effective communication may be subconsciously undermined when dealing with conversational coherence. These conclusions support the idea that phatic communication plays a key role in social life.

== Statistical challenges ==
In 2000, Fernando Pereira of the University of Pennsylvania fitted a simple statistical Markov model to a body of newspaper text, and showed that under this model, Furiously sleep ideas green colorless is about 200,000 times less probable than Colorless green ideas sleep furiously.

This statistical model defines a similarity metric, whereby sentences which are more like those within a corpus in certain respects are assigned higher values than sentences less alike. Pereira's model assigns an ungrammatical version of the same sentence a lower probability than the syntactically well-formed structure demonstrating that statistical models can identify variations in grammaticality with minimal linguistic assumptions. However, it is not clear that the model assigns every ungrammatical sentence a lower probability than every grammatical sentence. That is, colorless green ideas sleep furiously may still be statistically more "remote" from English than some ungrammatical sentences. To this, it may be argued that no current theory of grammar is capable of distinguishing all grammatical English sentences from ungrammatical ones.

== Related and similar examples ==
=== In other languages ===
The French syntactician Lucien Tesnière came up with the following two sentences to demonstrate the contrast between syntax and meaning:

- le signal vert indique la voie libre ("the green signal indicates the clear way")
- le silence vertébral indispose la voile licite ("the vertebral silence inconveniences the licit sail")

In Russian schools of linguistics, the glokaya kuzdra example has similar characteristics.

=== In games ===
The game of exquisite corpse is a method for generating nonsense sentences. It was named after the first sentence generated in the game in 1925: Le cadavre exquis boira le vin nouveau (the exquisite corpse will drink the new wine).

In the popular game of "Mad Libs", a chosen player asks each other player to provide parts of speech without providing any contextual information (e.g., "Give me a proper noun", or "Give me an adjective"), and these words are inserted into pre-composed sentences with a correct grammatical structure, but in which certain words have been omitted. The humor of the game is in the generation of sentences which are grammatical but which are meaningless or have absurd or ambiguous meanings (such as 'loud sharks'). The game also tends to generate humorous double entendres.

=== In philosophy ===
There are likely earlier examples of such sentences, possibly from the philosophy of language literature, but not necessarily uncontroversial ones, given that the focus has been mostly on borderline cases. For example, followers of logical positivism hold that "metaphysical" (i.e. not empirically verifiable) statements are simply meaningless; e.g. Rudolf Carnap wrote an article in which he argued that almost every sentence from Heidegger was grammatically well-formed, yet meaningless.

The philosopher Bertrand Russell used the sentence "Quadruplicity drinks procrastination" in his "An Inquiry into Meaning and Truth" from 1940, to make a similar point; W.V. Quine took issue with him on the grounds that for a sentence to be false is nothing more than for it not to be true; and since quadruplicity does not drink anything, the sentence is simply false, not meaningless.

Other arguably "meaningless" utterances are ones that make sense, are grammatical, but have no reference to the present state of the world, such as Russell's "The present King of France is bald" (France does not presently have a king) from "On Denoting" (also see definite description).

=== In literature and entertainment ===
Another approach is to create a syntactically-well-formed, easily parsable sentence using nonsense words; a famous such example is "The gostak distims the doshes". Lewis Carroll's Jabberwocky is also famous for using this technique, although in this case for literary purposes; similar sentences used in neuroscience experiments are called Jabberwocky sentences.

In a sketch about linguistics, British comedy duo Fry and Laurie used the nonsensical sentence "Hold the newsreader's nose squarely, waiter, or friendly milk will countermand my trousers."

The Star Trek: The Next Generation episode "Darmok" features a race that communicates entirely by referencing folklore and stories. While the vessel's universal translator correctly translates the characters and places from these stories, it fails to decipher the intended meaning, leaving Captain Picard unable to understand the alien.

== See also ==
- Buffalo buffalo Buffalo buffalo buffalo buffalo Buffalo buffalo
- Comparative illusion, also known as Escher sentences
- Gostak
- James while John had had had had had had had had had had had a better effect on the teacher
- List of linguistic example sentences
- Pseudoword
- Syntax‐semantics interface
