= Runcible =

Nonsense word created by Edward Lear

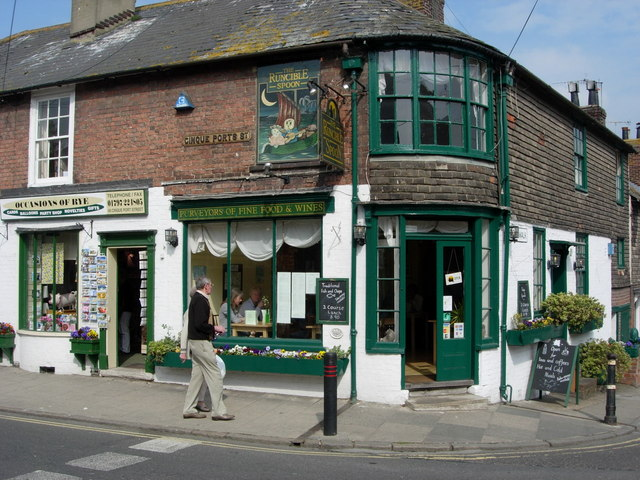
The Runcible Spoon, in Rye, England; the sign shows an owl and a pussy-cat.

"Runcible" is a pseudoword invented by Edward Lear. The word appears (as an adjective) several times in his works, most famously as the "runcible spoon" used by the Owl and the Pussycat. The word "runcible" was apparently one of Lear's favourite inventions, appearing in several of his works in reference to a number of different objects. In his verse self-portrait, The Self-Portrait of the Laureate of Nonsense, it is noted that "he weareth a runcible hat". Other poems include mention of a "runcible cat", a "runcible goose" (in the sense of "silly person"), a "runcible wall", and "the Rural Runcible Raven".

Various things have been named "runcible" or "runcible spoon", including a computer program compiler for an early programming language, a restaurant in Bloomington, Indiana, and a food magazine published in the District of Columbia.

== Origin ==
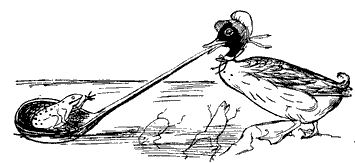
One of Edward Lear's drawings depicts the dolomphious duck's use of a runcible spoon.

Edward Lear's best-known poem, The Owl and the Pussy-Cat, published in 1870, includes the passage:

They dined on mince and slices of quince,
which they ate with a runcible spoon.

Another mention of this piece of cutlery appears in Edward Lear's alphabetical illustrations Twenty-Six Nonsense Rhymes and Pictures. Its entry for 'D' reads

The Dolomphious Duck,
who caught Spotted Frogs for her dinner
with a Runcible Spoon

Lear often illustrated his own poems, and he drew a picture of the "dolomphious duck" holding in its beak a round-bowled spoon containing a frog.

== Alternative origins ==
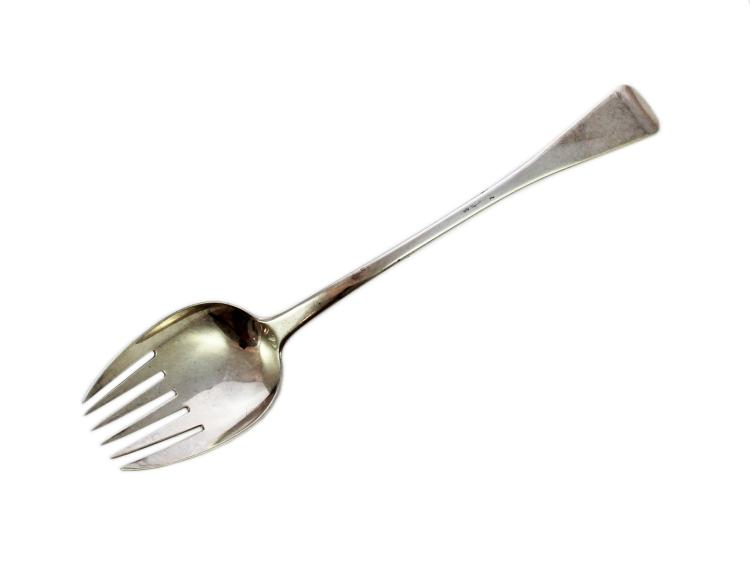
Sterling silver runcible spoon (Eley & Fearn, London, 1817)

Lear does not appear to have had any firm idea of what the word "runcible" means. His whimsical nonsense verse celebrates words primarily for their sound, and a specific definition is not needed to appreciate his work. However, since the 1920s (several decades after Lear's death), modern dictionaries have generally defined a "runcible spoon" as a fork with three broad curved tines and a sharpened edge, used with pickles or hors d'oeuvres, such as a pickle fork. It is used as a synonym for "spork". However, this definition is not consistent with Lear's drawing, in which it is a ladle, nor does it account for the other "runcible" objects in Lear's poems.

In other uses, a so-called runcible spoon is a fork shaped like a spoon, a spoon shaped fork, a grapefruit spoon (a spoon with serrated edges around the bowl), or a serving-spoon with a slotted bowl. Cutlery of this design (but not name) is evidenced as early as 1817.

Brewer's Dictionary of Phrase and Fable defines a runcible spoon as: "A horn spoon with a bowl at each end, one the size of a table-spoon and the other the size of a tea-spoon. There is a joint midway between the two bowls by which the bowls can be folded over." The Merriam-Webster dictionary defines it as "a sharp-edged fork with three broad curved prongs". Neither dictionary cites a source for these definitions.

The "Notes & Queries" column in The Guardian also raised the question "What is a runcible spoon?" The fanciful answers proposed by readers included that it was a variety of spoon designed by Lear's friend George Runcy for the use of infants, or that it was a reference to a butler named Robert Runcie whose job included polishing the silver spoons. The final contribution pointed out that neither of these explained the runcible cat in "The Pobble Who Has No Toes" and simply suggested that "runcible objects (spoons or cats) exist no more than pobbles or feline-hiboutic matrimony".

The Straight Dope, while treating "runcible" as a nonsense word with no particular meaning, claims that an unspecified 1920s source connected the word "runcible" etymologically to Roncevaux — the connection being that a runcible spoon's cutting edge resembles a sword such as was used in the Battle of Roncevaux Pass. The Straight Dope adds that "modern students of runciosity" link the word in a different way to Roncevaux: The obsolete adjective "rouncival" (an alternative spelling of rounceval), meaning "gigantic", also derives from Roncevaux, either by way of a certain large variety of pea grown there, or from a once-current find of gigantic fossilized bones in the region.
