= The Owl and the Pussy-Cat =

1870 nonsense poem by Edward Lear

- by Edward Lear
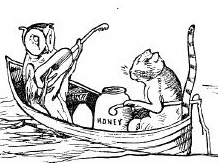
- Edward Lear's illustration of the Owl and the Pussycat
- Illustrator: Edward Lear
- Country: United Kingdom
- Genre: Nonsense poem
- Publication date: 1870

Full text
- The Owl and the Pussy-cat at Wikisource

Reading of "The Owl and the Pussy-Cat"

"The Owl and the Pussy-Cat" is a nonsense poem by Edward Lear, first published in 1870 in the American magazine Our Young Folks and again the following year in Lear's own book Nonsense Songs, Stories, Botany, and Alphabets. Lear wrote the poem for a three-year-old girl, Janet Symonds, the daughter of Lear's friend and fellow poet John Addington Symonds and his wife Catherine Symonds. The term "runcible", used for the phrase "runcible spoon", was invented for the poem. It is believed that the cat in the poem was based on Lear's own pet cat, Foss.

== Synopsis ==
"The Owl and the Pussy-Cat" features four anthropomorphic animals – an owl, a cat, a pig, and a turkey – and tells the story of the love between the title characters who sail off to marry in the land "where the Bong-tree grows".

== Unfinished sequel ==
Portions of an unfinished sequel, "The Children of the Owl and the Pussy-cat", were published first posthumously during 1938. The children are part fowl and part cat, and love to eat mice.

The family live by places with strange names. The Cat dies, falling from a tall tree, leaving the Owl a single parent. The death causes the Owl great sadness. The money is all spent, but the Owl still sings to the original guitar.

== Derivative works ==
British picture book author Beatrix Potter stated that her work The Tale of Little Pig Robinson was the backstory of the character Piggy from "The Owl and the Pussy-Cat".

The text has been set to music many times, such as by Victor Hely-Hutchinson, whose 1927 setting was recorded by Elton Hayes in 1953 for Parlophone, Humphrey Searle in 1951, using twelve-tone technique for the accompanying flute, guitar, and cello, but sprechgesang for the vocal part, and Igor Stravinsky, who composed his setting in October 1966. American avant-garde artist and composer Laurie Anderson's fifth album, Bright Red (1994), features the track "Beautiful Pea Green Boat", which incorporates lyrics from the poem.

"The Owl and the Pussy-Cat" was the main topic of The Owl and the Pussycat Went to See..., a 1968 children's musical play about Lear's nonsense poems. The play was written by Sheila Ruskin and David Wood. In 1996, Eric Idle published a children's novel, The Quite Remarkable Adventures of the Owl and the Pussycat, based on the poem. Idle's narration of the audiobook was nominated for the 1998 Grammy Award for Best Spoken Word Album for Children. In 1998, Naxos Records produced the album Seven Ages: An Anthology of Poetry with Music, which contains a recording of John Cleese reading "The Owl and the Pussy-Cat" on track 15.

== See also ==
- The Wind in the Willows
- Mister Rogers' Neighborhood, an American fantasy television program whose main characters include and Owl and a Pussycat
