= Protologism =

New word that has not yet been independently published

In linguistics, a protologism is a newly coined word, a nonce word, that has been repeated but has not gained acceptance beyond its original users or been published independently of the coiners. (Note: "One such neologism is the Wiktionary's protologism, a term invented by Mikhail Epstein of Emory University to refer to a newly created and proposed word which has not yet gained acceptance" (Humez, Humez & Flynn 2010, p. 36).) (Note: "Recognising the preliminary (or even want-to-be) nature of many neologisms, Mikhail N. Epstein the American literary theorist and thinker coined his own: ‘protologism’, which refers to a neologism that has not yet been accepted as a useful or substantiated addition to the vocabulary" (Moore 2011).) The word may be proposed, may be extremely new, or may be established only within a very limited group of people. (Note: "This process [of lexicalization] does not seem to be coincidental because neologisms themselves are prone to go through certain stages of transformation. They begin as unstable creations (otherwise called protologisms), that is, they are extremely new, being proposed, or being used only by a small subculture" (Gryniuk 2015, p. 150).) (Note: "Most of [Lewis] Carroll's words were not adopted into the language, but nonetheless, such literary invention will be familiar to anyone reading academic writers, where terms are created for conveying particular innovative concepts. Linguists even have a word for such terms, protologisms (itself a modern neologism), a word that is new and not yet established beyond a small group" (Aitken 2013, p. 316).)

A protologism becomes a neologism as soon as it appears in published press, on a website, or in a book, independently of the coiner—though, most definitively, in a dictionary. A word whose developmental stage is between that of a protologism (freshly coined) and a neologism (a new word) is a prelogism.

== Overview ==
Protologisms constitute one stage in the development of neologisms. A protologism is coined to fill a gap in the language, with the hope of it becoming an accepted word. (Note: "Ėpštejn's projective dictionary should be a collection of protologisms, a protologism being a new word, coined to designate a new phenomenon or to fill in blank spaces and semantic voids in the lexical-conceptual system, as he proclaimed in 2003" (Eismann 2015, p. 1756).) (Note: "The term protologism describes a word which has been coined in the 'hope' that it will become accepted into usage" (Maxwell 2014).) As an example, when the word protologism itself was coined—in 2003 (Note: For the earliest date of the use of the word protologism, Maxwell (2014) and Miller (2014, p. x) indicate 2005; Eismann (2015, p. 1756) and Epstein (2011, p. 19) indicate 2003.) by the American literary theorist Mikhail Epstein—it was autological: an example of the thing it describes. (Note: Maxwell (2014) writes, "In other words, the term protologism is a protologism. This phenomenon, where a word itself possesses the property it refers to, is technically described as being autological". Aitken (2013, p. 316), Humez, Humez & Flynn (2010, p. 36), and Moore (2011), on the other hand, each describe protologism as a neologism.)

About the concept and his name for it, Epstein wrote:

I suggest calling such brand new words 'protologisms' (from Greek protos, meaning 'first, original' and Greek logos, meaning 'word'; cf. prototype, protoplasm). The protologism is a freshly minted word not yet widely accepted. It is a verbal prototype, which may eventually be adopted for public service or remain a whim of linguo-poetic imagination.

According to Epstein, every word in use started out as a protologism, subsequently became a neologism, and then gradually grew to be part of the language.

There is no fixed rule determining when a protologism becomes a stable neologism, and according to Kerry Maxwell, author of Brave New Words:

[A] protologism is unlikely to make the leap to neologism status unless society connects with the word or identifies a genuine need for it [...] there's no guarantee that simple exposure to these creations will be effective in getting them used, as discovered by British inventor Sir James Dyson when he fruitlessly attempted to promote a verb dyson (by analogy with hoover) in the early 2000s.

== In science ==
It has been suggested protologisms are needed in scientific fields, particularly in the life sciences, where very complex interactions between partially understood components produce higher order phenomena. Nevertheless, until the unappreciated concept in question has been thoroughly investigated and shown to be a real phenomenon, it is improbable that the term would be used by anyone other than its creator and achieve the status of neologism.

== See also ==
- Hapax legomenon, a word occurring only once in a given context, such as in the works of a particular author
- Neologism, a relatively recent or isolated term, word, or phrase that may be in the process of entering common use, but that has not yet been fully accepted into mainstream language.
- Nonce word, a word created for a single occasion
- Sniglet, a humorous word made up to describe something for which no dictionary word exists
