= The Pompatus of Love =

- DVD cover
- Directed by: Richard Schenkman
- Written by: Jon Cryer; Adam Oliensis; Richard Schenkman
- Produced by: John O'Rourke; D. J. Paul; Jon Resnik
- Starring: Jon Cryer; Mia Sara; Jennifer Tilly; Tim Guinee; Adrian Pasdar; Kristin Scott Thomas
- Music by: John Hill
- Production company: Cinepix Film Properties
- Distributed by: BMG Independents
- Release date: July 26, 1996
- Running time: 99 minutes
- Country: United States
- Language: English

The Pompatus of Love is a 1996 American comedy film that tells the story of four guys discussing women and the meaning of the word "pompatus". This made-up word is found in two Steve Miller songs, "Enter Maurice" and "The Joker", the latter of which contains the line "Some people call me Maurice/'cause I speak of the pompatus of love". Wolfman Jack can also be heard using the term in his spoken lines in The Guess Who's "Clap for the Wolfman."

The low-budget, independent film received mostly negative reviews.

== Plot ==
The film revolves around four friends and their relationships with women. Set to the background of upscale Manhattan bars, lofts and apartments, the guys engage in sharp banter and one-upsmanship.

The men spend much of their time trying to decipher the word "pompatus," from the Steve Miller song, wondering whether they are mis-hearing the lyrics: "Prophetess"? "Impetus"? "Profitless"? "Impotence"? "Pompous Ass"? "Pom-pom tits"? "Poconos"?

The characters, Mark, a therapist (Jon Cryer); Runyon, a playwright (Tim Guinee); Josh, a playboy (Adrian Pasdar) and Phil, a plumber (Adam Oliensis), try (generally unsuccessfully) to sort out their troubled love-lives.

Mark and his girlfriend Natasha (Kristen Wilson) who met on a blind date, are hung up over moving in together. They go to apartment after apartment, never agreeing on one they both like. She is getting more and more claustrophobic, having a dream that she is a field mouse that a bird of prey with Mark's face is closing in on her. They close on a half-finished house, and Tasha bails on him.

Runyon is hung up over his old girlfriend Kathryn (Dana Wheeler-Nicholson), who has moved to Los Angeles. He flies there, with the excuse of seeking a producer for his screenplay. He goes so far as to sneak into her bedroom in the middle of the night to see her. He at least has a dinner date with someone new for Friday

The womanizing Josh is hung up on Phil's sister, Gina (Paige Turco), who has an abusive husband. He meets Cynthia, single woman (Mia Sara) who he bumps into while going down a staircase. After a nice lunch he seems to genuinely like her so offers to make her dinner. Even though they have good chemistry, when Gina shows up earlier, they end up in bed together and he blows Cynthia off. He contacts Cynthia again and says he wants to go slow.

Phil, who is married with children, finds himself attracted to an older English interior designer (Kristin Scott Thomas) who is coming on to him regularly. He finds out about Gina and Josh, so storms by Josh's to pick her up. He confronts the designer, telling her he can't cheat on his wife.

The film finishes with the four friends again discussing the meaning of the Steve Miller song. Mark's relationship is over; Runyon has closure; Josh for once is going to try to have a relationship; and Phil is maintaining his marriage.

== Cast ==
- Jon Cryer as Mark
- Adrian Pasdar as Josh
- Mia Sara as Cynthia
- Kristin Scott Thomas as Caroline
- Tim Guinee as Runyon
- Adam Oliensis as Phil
- Arabella Field as Lori - Phil's Wife
- Paige Turco as Gina
- Dana Wheeler-Nicholson as Kathryn
- Kristen Wilson as Tasha
- Charlie Murphy as Saxophone Man
- Jennifer Tilly as Tarzaan
- Roscoe Lee Browne as Leonard Folder
- Lianna Pai as Ling (as Liana Pai)
- Renee Props as Flynn (as Reneé Props)
- Jim Turner as Dick Spellman
- Fisher Stevens as Sitcom Star
- Michael McKean as Sitcom Star
- Angela Featherstone as Times Square Kisser
- Richard Schenkman as TV Newscaster (uncredited)

== Release ==
The film had trouble getting a distributor after its festival run, as several other male-oriented romantic comedy films were complete around the same time. The TV series Friends had also aired by the time production completed.

== Reception ==
Rotten Tomatoes reports that 17% of six critics gave the film a positive review; the average rating is 3.8/10. Roger Ebert of the Chicago Sun-Times rated it 2/4 stars and wrote, "This is an overdirected and overedited film, in love with the technique of short cuts in which characters finish each other's sentences." John Anderson of the Los Angeles Times wrote that the film's premise is "ludicrous and perfect, since the film is basically about the uninvolving being obsessed with the uninteresting". Lawrence Van Gelder of The New York Times called it "a literate, funny film about men, women and the many mysteries of love in the 1990s". Mick LaSalle of the San Francisco Chronicle wrote that the film, like other romantic comedy films about men, uses a stock premise that is false: men do not understand what women want.

=== Awards ===
- Best Comedy — Worldfest - Charleston
- Gold Award — Worldfest - Houston
- Silver Award — Festival Internacional de Cinema, Portugal
