= Andrew Ingraham =

American headmaster (1841–1905)

Andrew Ingraham (1841 - 1905) was an American educator, writer and soldier.

Ingraham was born on 19 December, 1841 at New Bedford, Massachusetts, United States.

He graduated from Dartmouth College in 1862.

During the Civil War, he enlisted with the Company I, of the Third Massachusetts regiment, where he served for nine months, before transfer to the signal corps.

After the war, he was principal of the Plymouth Academy from 1865 to 1866. Later he taught at the Friends’ school, in New Bedford, Massachusetts, eventually succeeding John Tetlow as headmaster in 1878. He held this position until 1883, when he became headmaster of the Swain free school, also in New Bedford, Massachusetts. He retained this position until the school suspended in 1903, upon which he moved to Cambridge, Massachusetts.

He is credited with the invention of the Gostak concept. He also edited various prefaces to standard literary texts.

He was the author of a number of publications, among them "A Spencerium In Symbols," "Subjunctive Meanings and a Science of Relations" and "Swain School Lectures."

He was survived by his widow, Mary Eva Hint, and three sons: George H. Ingraham, a Boston architect; Arthur Ingraham, of Oakland, Rhode Island; and Edward Ingraham, of New York.

Ingraham died August 1905, in Cambridge, Massachusetts, USA
