= Foss (cat) =

Cat owned by Edward Lear

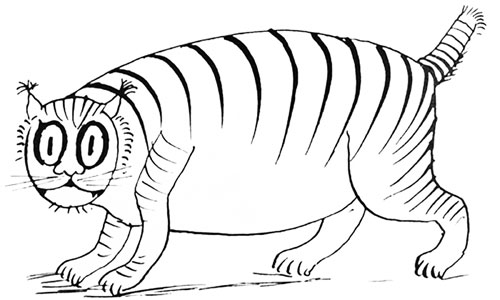
- Foss illustrated by Lear
- Other name: Aderphos
- Species: Cat
- Breed: Tabby
- Sex: Male
- Died: 26 November 1887
- Resting place: Villa Tennyson
- Owner: Edward Lear

Foss (c. 1873 – 26 November 1887), formally named Aderphos, was the pet cat of Edward Lear, the 19th-century author, artist, illustrator and poet. A "stumpy-tailed", "portly" and "unattractive" tabby cat, he was a favourite of Lear's and played an important role as a companion in the poet's lonely later years. Foss is mentioned frequently in Lear's correspondence and appears in his illustrations and at least one poem. Foss is said to have been the inspiration for the pussycat in Lear's illustrations for his poem "The Owl and the Pussycat". The funeral that Lear provided for Foss, which included an epigraphed headstone, is said to have been more elaborate than Lear's own.

== Description ==
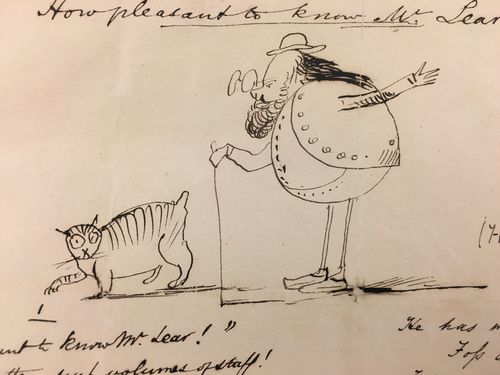
Foss and Lear depicted in an 1879 letter to Archdeacon William Bevan

Foss is said to have been adopted by Edward Lear whilst a kitten in 1873, though Lear later claimed he was older. His full name was the Greek word Aderphos (a variant of Adelphos, "brother"), but he was generally known by the shortened form of "Foss" or, particularly by Lear, "Old Foss". Foss was a tabby cat described as "unattractive". His tail was cut short by Lear's servants to try to prevent him from wandering. No photographs survive of the cat, as he jumped out of Lear's arms on the only occasion when one was to be taken.

Lear grew fond of Foss and he was said to be his favourite animal. Foss was mentioned often in Lear's correspondence, to the extent that he was said to have been almost as famous as Lear at the time. He was said to roll on Lear's manuscripts to help dry the ink. Many accounts say that when Lear was planning his relocation to Sanremo, he had his architect design his new villa on the same floor plan as his previous home to avoid confusing Foss. Despite this, on his first day in the villa Foss climbed into one of its chimneys.

== Artistic influence ==
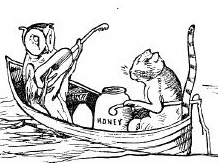
The titular cat in "The Owl and the Pussy-Cat", based on Foss

Foss is said to have been the model for the pussycat in Lear's "The Owl and the Pussy-Cat" illustrations, though he chose to depict a full-length tail. Foss is also mentioned in Lear's poem "How Pleasant to Know Mr Lear":

He has many friends, lay men and clerical,
Old Foss is the name of his cat;
His body is perfectly spherical,
He weareth a runcible hat.

— Stanza 5 (lines 21-24)

There are also many drawings by Lear of Foss, including the two together and a series depicting Foss in supposed heraldic poses – these include couchant, passant, rampant, regardant and the more fanciful "dansant" (dancing) and "a untin" (hunting). The New York Times said that Lear's illustrations of Foss were his best caricatures.

== Death ==
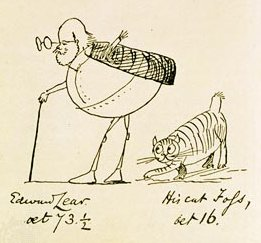
Edward Lear Aged 73 and a Half and His Cat Foss, Aged 16 (1885)

Foss was a key companion in Lear's later years, at a time when Lear was battling depression and loneliness. Foss died at Lear's Villa Tennyson in Sanremo in November 1887, just two months before Lear's own death. Foss has been reported as being 14, 16 or 17 years old at the time of his death, though Lear was convinced that he was much older and had the age of 31 years engraved on Foss' headstone. Some of Lear's pre-1872 drawings depict a cat very similar to Foss with a stumpy tail, tabby markings, and a portly appearance, and it is possible that Lear, knowingly or otherwise, conflated his imagined cat with the real Foss.

Foss was buried under his own headstone – with an epitaph composed by Lear – beneath a fig tree in the garden at Villa Tennyson. Foss' funeral is said to have had greater pomp and ceremony than Lear's own, which was poorly attended. Foss is mentioned in the song "Mr Lear" by British folk singer Al Stewart on his 2005 album A Beach Full of Shells.

== See also ==
- List of individual cats
