= The Medallions =

American doo-wop vocal group

- Origin: Los Angeles, California, U. S.
- Genre: R&B
- Years active: 1954–1960s occasional since 2000
- Label: Dootone
- Past members: Vernon Green; Andrew Blue; Randolph Bryant; Ira Foley; Willy Graham; Donald Woods; Jimmy Green; Charles Gardner; Albert Johnson; Otis Scott; Billy Foster; Tommy Turner; Bubba (Buddha) Carter; Joe Williams; Jerome Evans

The Medallions were an American doo-wop vocal group led by Vernon Green.

== History ==
=== Formation ===
The group formed in Los Angeles, California, in 1954, after Vernon Green was heard singing on the street by Walter "Dootsie" Williams, the owner of Dootone Records. Green – who walked with a cane as a result of childhood polio – put together a singing group with three friends from Fremont High School, Andrew Blue (tenor), Randolph Bryant (baritone), and Ira Foley (bass), and named them the Medallions because of his own penchant for wearing medallions around his neck.

=== Releases and performing ===
Their first release, "Buick 59", based on Todd Rhodes' double-entendre R&B recording "Rocket 69", was one of the first releases on Dootone in September 1954. It was backed with a ballad called "The Letter", which received extensive airplay in the region. "The Letter" contained the nonsense lyric, "the 'puppetutes' of love", which was later picked up by the Steve Miller Band as "the pompatus of love" and used in their song "The Joker". The song also included the nonsense word "pismotality", invented by Green.

Blue was replaced by Willy Graham, and Donald Woods joined to make the group a quintet. The group became a popular attraction in southern California, appearing on bills with stars such as Fats Domino, Percy Mayfield and T-Bone Walker. The Medallions performed for the eleventh famed Cavalcade of Jazz concert held at Wrigley Field in Los Angeles which was produced by Leon Hefflin, Sr. on July 24, 1955 and also featured Big Jay McNeely, Lionel Hampton and His Orchestra, The Penguins, and James Moody and His Orchestra.

They continued to release singles on Dootone into late 1955, including "Edna", a favorite of Frank Zappa when interviewed on the Pop Chronicles documentary. They also recorded with singer Johnny Morrisette as Johnny Twovoice & The Medallions. The original version of the Medallions then broke up.

=== Post break up and later line-ups ===
Green then joined forces with a different group, the Dootones (who were sometimes billed as the "New" Medallions), before forming a new version of the Medallions with his brother Jimmy Green (tenor), Charles Gardner (tenor, formerly of the Dootones), Albert Johnson (tenor), and Otis Scott (bass). There were numerous personnel changes in the group thereafter, with Vernon Green the only constant member, and the group became officially known as Vernon Green and the Medallions. Members included Billy Foster – who later, as Etta James' boyfriend at the time, received a co-writing credit for the song "I'd Rather Go Blind" – bass singers Bubba (or Buddha) Carter, and Joe Williams. In 1957, the group recorded for Specialty Records as the Phantoms, and Green also recorded with the Cameos. Green then returned to Williams' label, by then renamed Dooto Records, with a new line-up of the Medallions comprising himself, his brother Jimmy, Billy Foster, and Joe Williams. The group, with a variety of line-ups, later recorded for the Pan World and Minit labels, continuing to release singles into the early 1960s.

The group ceased to exist after Green was injured in a car collision in the mid-1960s, although he released a single, "Can You Talk", on Dootone as late as 1973. Since the death of Vernon Green in 2000, the group has been occasionally reconstituted by his brother Jimmy Green, Billy Foster, Buddha Carter, Jack Palti, and Jerome Evans, who have performed as the New Medallions.

== Discography ==
Singles

- "Buick '59"/"The Letter" (Dootone, 1954)
- "The Telegram"/"Coupe De Ville Baby" (Dootone, 1955)
- "Edna"/"Speedin'" (Dootone, 1955)
- "Dear Darling"/"Don't Shoot Baby" (Dootone, 1955)
- "I Want A Love"/"Dance & Swing" (Dootone, 1956)
- "Shedding Tears For You"/"Pushbutton Automobile" (Dootone, 1956)
- "Magic Mountain"/"'59 Volvo" (Dooto, 1959)
- "For Better Or For Worse"/"I Wonder, I Wonder, I Wonder" (Dooto, 1957)
- "A Lover's Prayer"/"Unseen" (Dooto, 1957)
- "Did You Have Fun?"/"My Mary Lou" (Dooto, 1956)
- "Behind The Door*/"Rocket Ship" (Dooto, 1959)
- "Deep, So Deep"/"Dear Ann" (Pan World, 1962)
- "Dear Ann"/"Shimmy Shimmy Shake" (Pan World, 1962)
- "Look At Me, Look At Me"/"Am I Ever Gonna See My Baby Again" (Minit, 1964)
- Can You Talk"/"You Don't Know" (Dootone, 1973)
