= Edward Lear =

British artist, poet and writer (1812–1888)

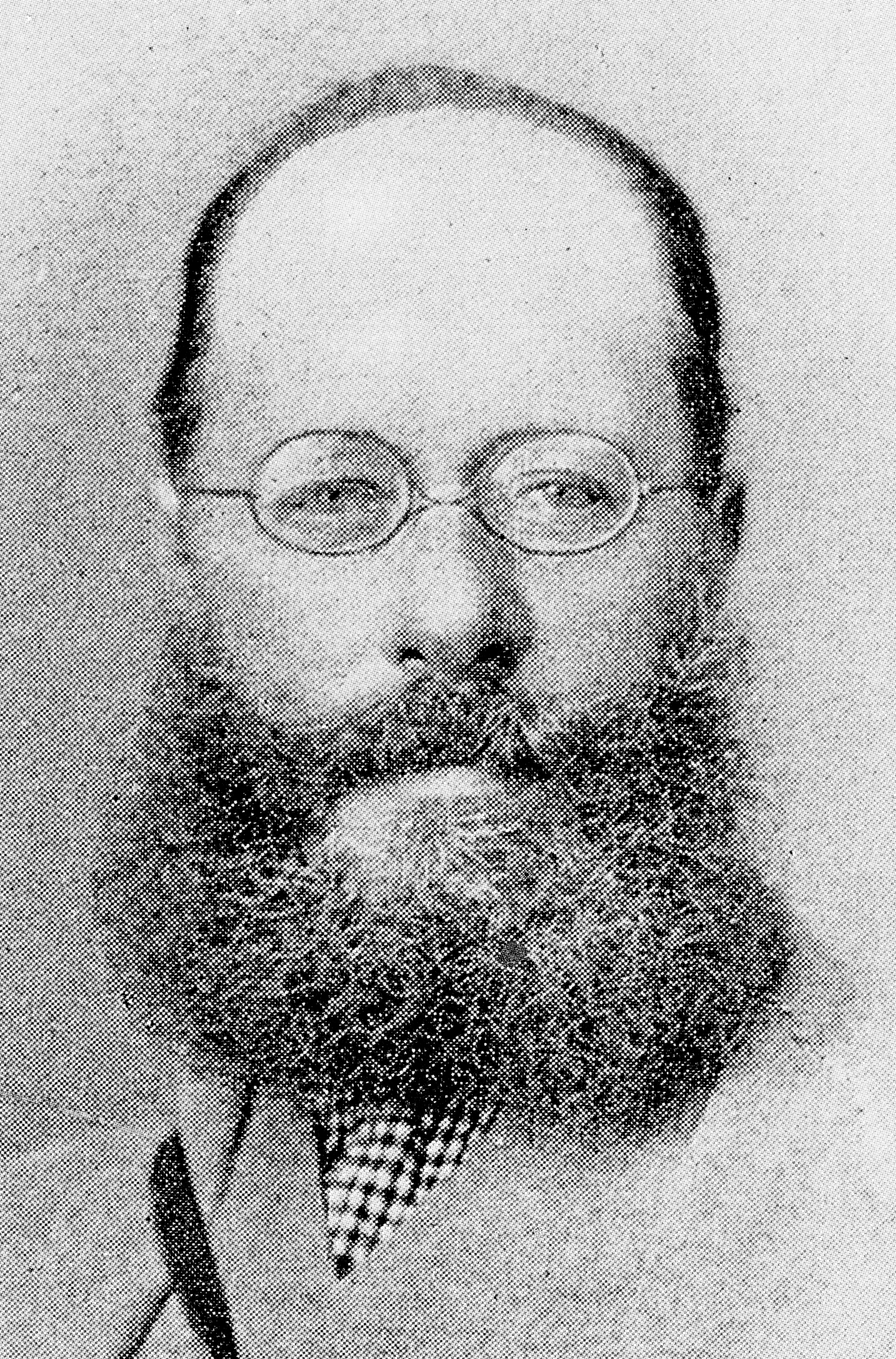
- Lear in 1866
- Born: 12 May 1812; Holloway, Middlesex, England
- Died: 29 January 1888 (aged 75); Sanremo, Liguria, Italy
- Citizenship: British, Italian
- Occupations: Artist, illustrator, writer, poet, musician
- Writing career
- Period: 19th century
- Genres: Children's literature, literary nonsense and limericks
- Notable works: The Book of Nonsense, "The Owl and the Pussy-Cat"

Edward Lear (12 May 1812 – 29 January 1888) was an English artist, illustrator, musician, author and poet, who is known mostly for his literary nonsense in poetry and prose and especially his limericks, a form he popularised but which term he never used.

His principal areas of work as an artist were threefold: as a draughtsman employed to make illustrations of birds and animals, making coloured drawings during his journeys (which he reworked later, sometimes as plates for his travel books) and as a minor illustrator of Alfred, Lord Tennyson's poems.

As an author, he is known principally for his popular nonsense collections of poems, songs, short stories, botanical drawings, recipes and alphabets. He also composed and published twelve musical settings of Tennyson's poetry.

== Biography ==
=== Early years ===
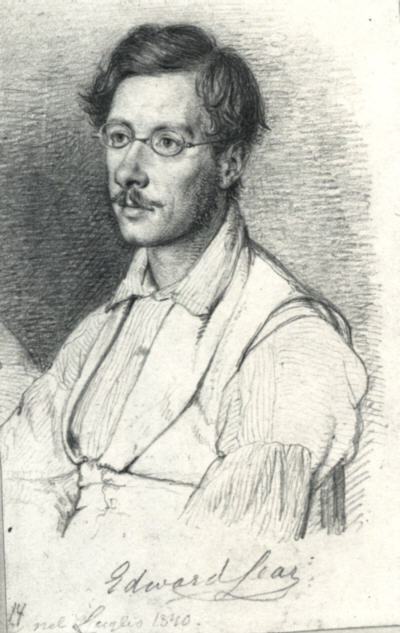
Lear by Wilhelm Marstrand

Lear was born into a middle-class family in Holloway north London, the penultimate of 21 children (and youngest to survive) of Ann Clark Skerrett and Jeremiah Lear, a stockbroker formerly working for the family sugar refining business. He was raised by his eldest sister, also named Ann, 21 years his senior. Jeremiah Lear ended up defaulting to the London Stock Exchange in the economic upheaval following the Napoleonic Wars. Because of the family's now more limited finances, when he was aged four, Lear and his sister were required to leave the family home, Bowmans Lodge, and live together. Ann doted on Edward and continued to act as a mother to him until her death, when he was almost 50 years of age.

Lear had lifelong health problems. From the age of six, he had frequent tonic-clonic epileptic seizures, bronchitis, asthma and, during later life, partial blindness. Lear experienced his first seizure at a fair near Highgate when with his father. The event scared and embarrassed him. He felt lifelong guilt and shame for his epileptic condition, and his adult diaries indicate that he always sensed the onset of a seizure in time to remove himself from public view. When Lear was about seven years old he began to show signs of depression, possibly due to the instability of his childhood. He had periods of severe melancholia which he referred to as "the Morbids".

=== Artist ===
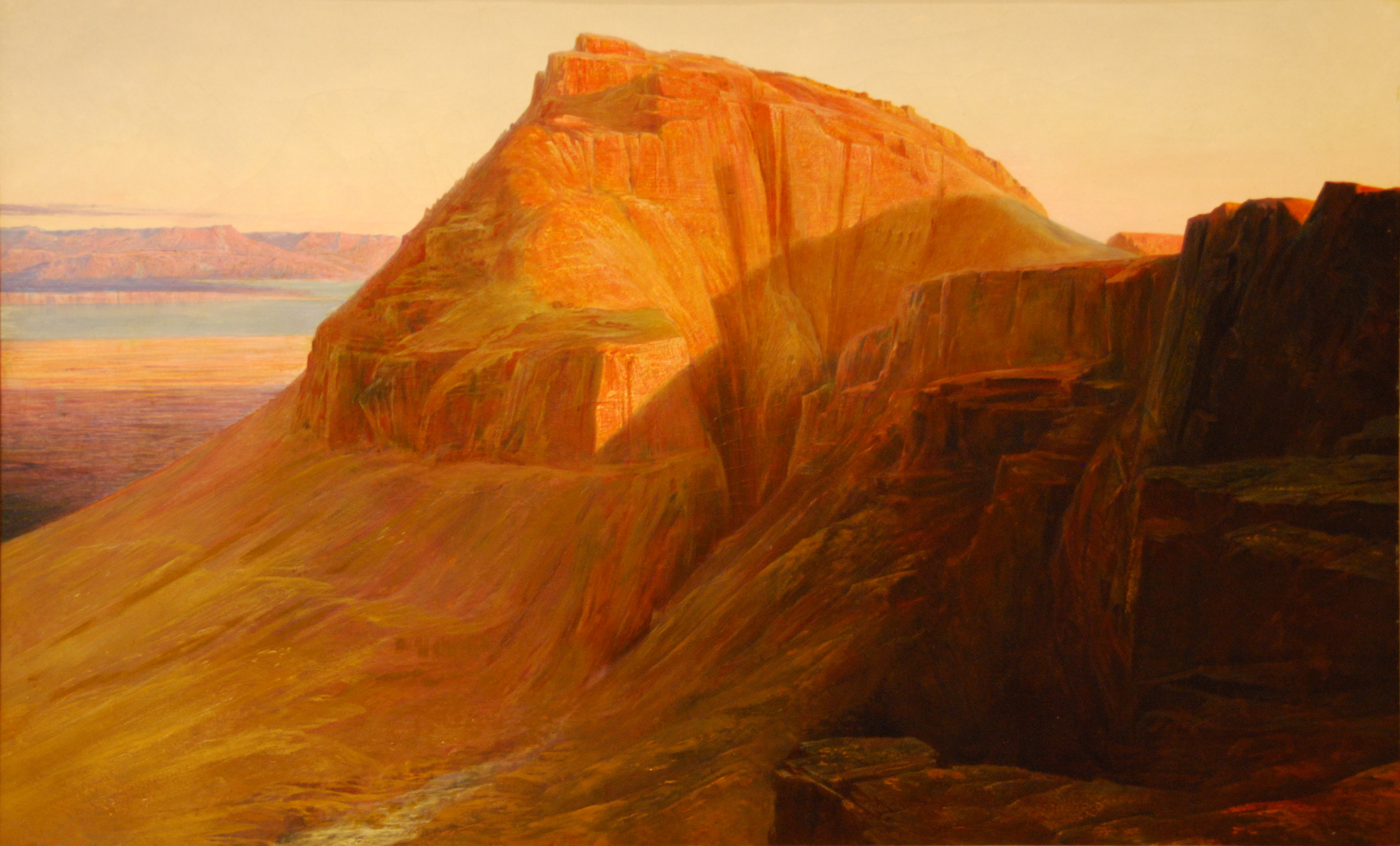
Masada on the Dead Sea, Edward Lear, 1858

Lear was already drawing "for bread and cheese" by the time he was aged 16 and soon developed into a serious "ornithological draughtsman" employed by the Zoological Society and from 1832 to 1836 by the Earl of Derby, who kept a private menagerie at his estate, Knowsley Hall. He was the first major bird artist to draw birds from life rather than the skins of specimens. Lear's first publication, published when he was 19 years old, was Illustrations of the Family of Psittacidae, or Parrots in 1830. One of the greatest ornithological artists of his era, he taught Elizabeth Gould whilst also contributing to John Gould's works and was compared by some to the naturalist John James Audubon. In honour of Lear's bird illustrations, Anodorhynchus leari, popular name Lear's macaw, is named after him.

After his eyesight deteriorated too much to work with such precision on the fine drawings and etchings of plates used in lithography, he turned to landscape painting and travel.

Among other travels, he visited Albania, Vardar Macedonia, Egypt (all of which were then part of the Ottoman Empire), and Greece, during 1848–49 and toured India during 1873–75, including a brief detour to Ceylon. While travelling he produced large quantities of coloured wash drawings in a distinctive style, which he converted later in his studio into oil and watercolour paintings, as well as prints for his books. His landscape style often shows views with strong sunlight, with intense contrasts of colour.

Between 1878 and 1883, Lear spent his summers on Monte Generoso, a mountain on the border between the Swiss canton of Ticino and the Italian region of Lombardy. His oil painting The Plains of Lombardy from Monte Generoso is in the Ashmolean Museum in Oxford.

Throughout his life, he continued to paint seriously. He had a lifelong ambition to illustrate Tennyson's poems; near the end of his life, a volume with a small number of illustrations was published.

=== Illustrated Excursions in Italy (1842–1847) ===
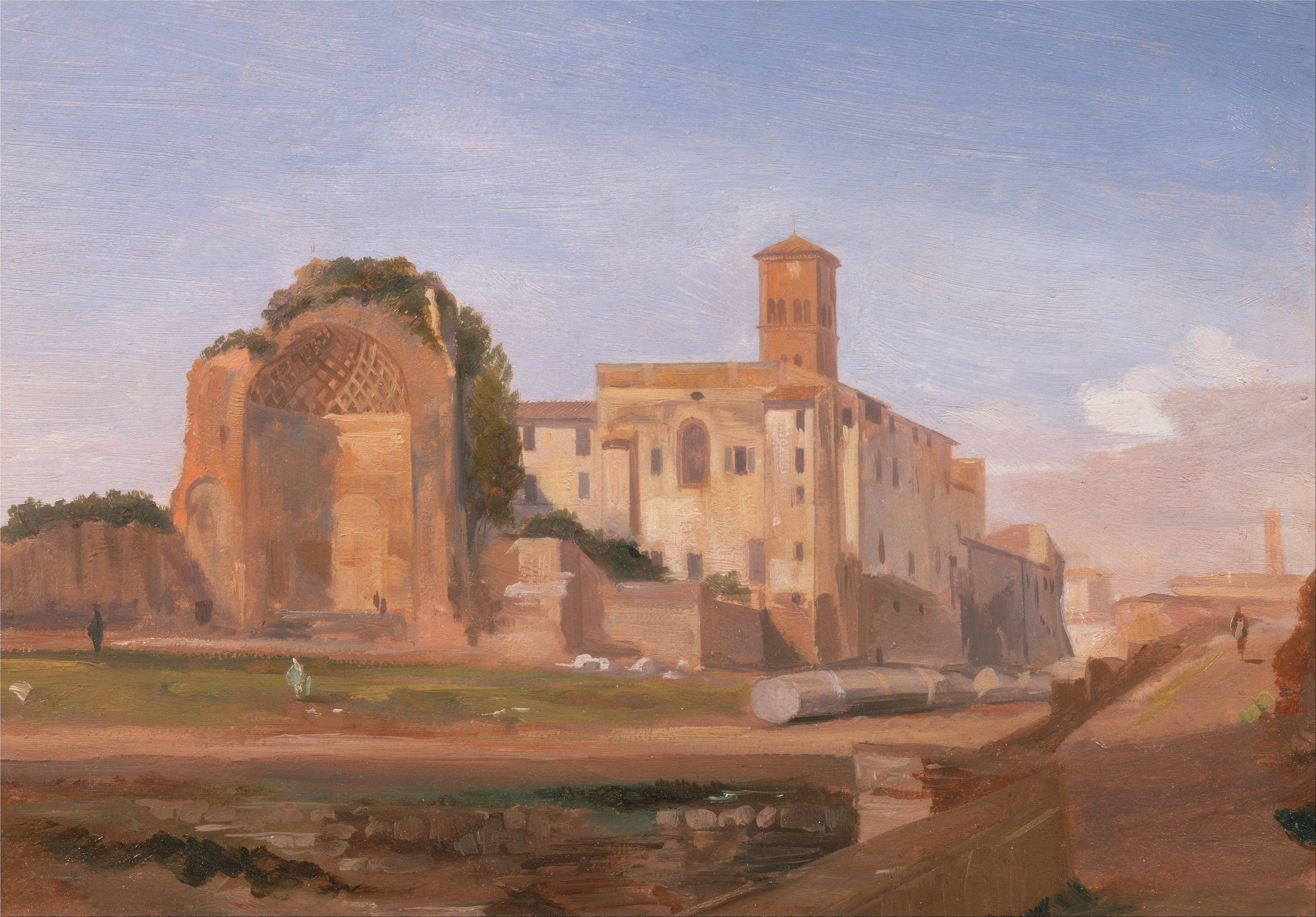
Temple of Venus and Roma, Rome

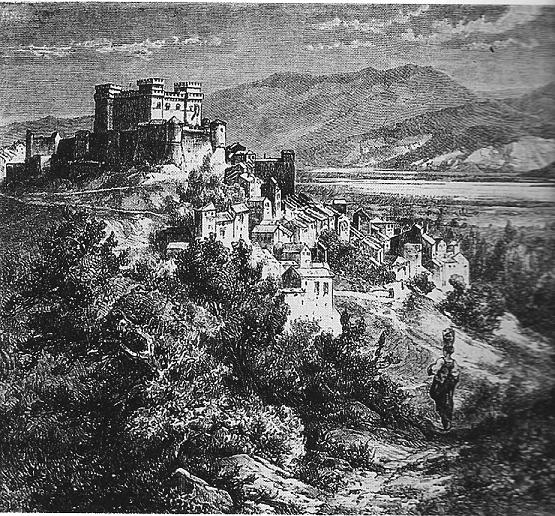
Engraving of Celano in Italy

In 1842, Lear began a journey into the Italian Peninsula, travelling through the Lazio, Rome, Abruzzo, Molise, Apulia, Basilicata, Calabria and Sicily. In personal notes, together with drawings, Lear gathered his impressions on the Italian way of life, folk traditions, and the beauty of the ancient monuments. Of particular interest to Lear was the Abruzzo, which he visited in 1843, through the Marsica (Celano, Avezzano, Alba Fucens, Trasacco) and the plateau of Cinque Miglia (Castel di Sangro and Alfedena), by an old sheep track of the shepherds.

Lear drew a sketch of the medieval village of Albe with Mount Sirente, and described the medieval village of Celano, with the castle of Piccolomini dominating the vast plain of Lago Fucino, which was drained a few years later to promote agricultural development. At Castel di Sangro, Lear described the winter stillness of the mountains and the beautiful basilica.

More adventurous was the voyage to the regions of southern Italy in 1847, described in Lear's Journals of a Landscape Painter in Southern Calabria, & c. The broad Calabria section in which Lear tells his itinerary among breathtaking landscapes and often surreal characters, is thought to be among the best in his travel literature.

=== Composer and musician ===
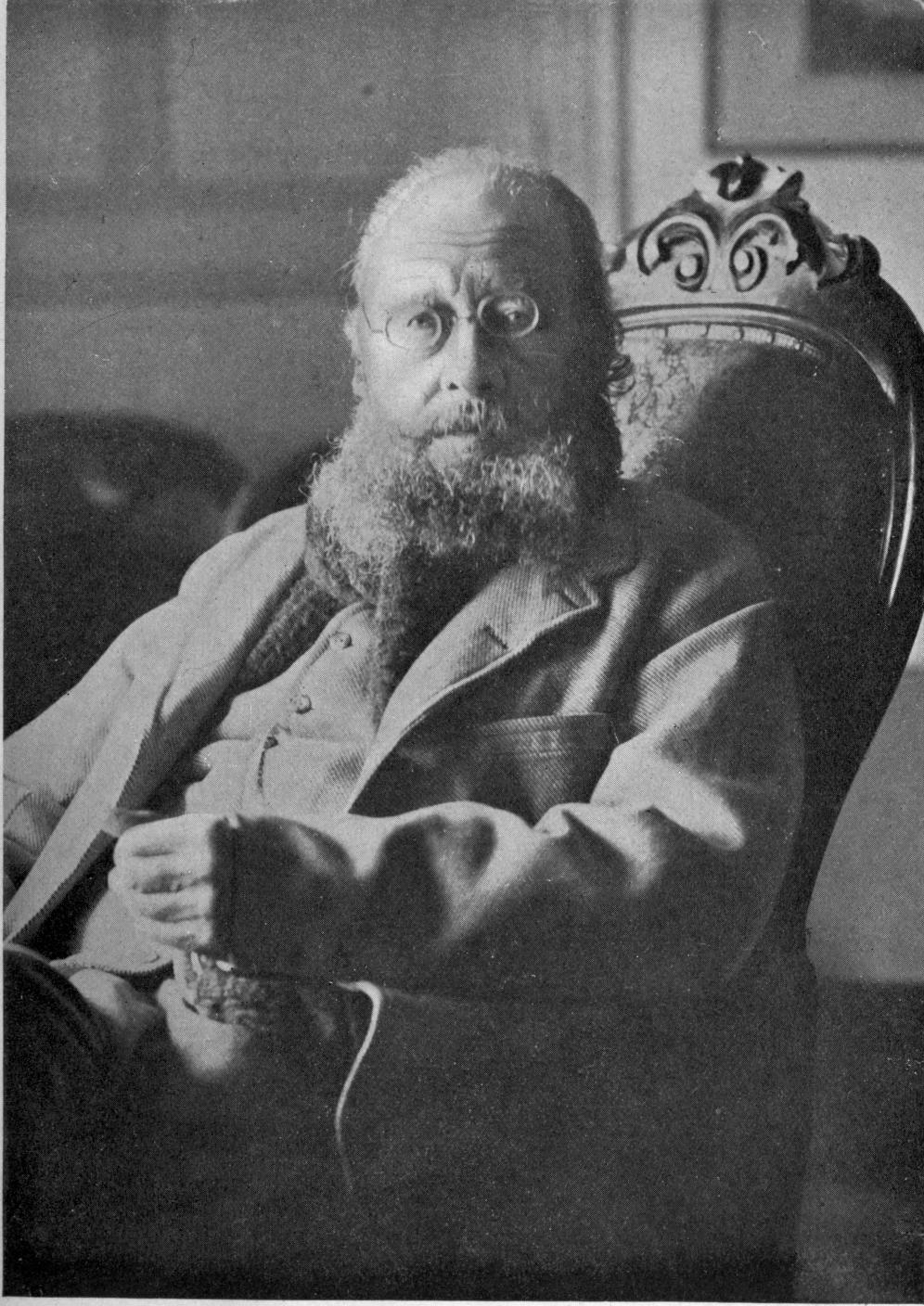
Lear in 1887, a year before his death. His arm was bent as he was holding his cat, Foss, who leapt away.

Lear primarily played the piano, but he also played the accordion, flute, and small guitar. He composed music for many Romantic and Victorian poems, but was known mostly for his many musical settings of Tennyson's poetry. He published four settings in 1853, five in 1859, and three in 1860. Lear's were the only musical settings that Tennyson approved of. Lear also composed music for many of his nonsense songs, including "The Owl and the Pussy-Cat", but only two of the scores have survived, the music for "The Courtship of the Yonghy-Bonghy-Bò" and "The Pelican Chorus". While he never played professionally, he did perform his own nonsense songs and his settings of others' poetry at countless social gatherings, sometimes adding his own lyrics (as with the song "The Nervous Family"), and sometimes replacing serious lyrics with nursery rhymes.

=== Relationships ===
Lear's most fervent and painful friendship was with Franklin Lushington. He met the young barrister in Malta in 1849 and toured southern Greece with him. Lear developed an infatuation for him that Lushington did not wholly reciprocate. Although they remained friends for almost forty years until Lear's death, the disparity of their feelings constantly tormented Lear. Indeed, Lear's attempts at male companionship were not always successful; the very intensity of Lear's affections may have doomed these relationships.

He proposed twice to another writer, Augusta Bethell, whom he had known for a long time, when he was 26 years her senior. For companions, he relied instead on friends and correspondents, and especially, during later life, on his Albanian Souliote chef, Giorgis, a faithful friend and (as Lear complained) a thoroughly unsatisfactory chef. Another trusted companion in San Remo was his cat, Foss, who died in 1887 and was buried with some ceremony in a garden at Villa Tennyson.

=== San Remo and death ===
Lear eventually settled in San Remo, on his beloved Mediterranean coast in the 1870s at a villa he named "Villa Tennyson".

Lear was known to introduce himself with a long pseudonym: "Mr Abebika kratoponoko Prizzikalo Kattefello Ablegorabalus Ableborinto phashyph" or "Chakonoton the Cozovex Dossi Fossi Sini Tomentilla Coronilla Polentilla Battledore & Shuttlecock Derry down Derry Dumps", which he based on Aldiborontiphoskyphorniostikos.

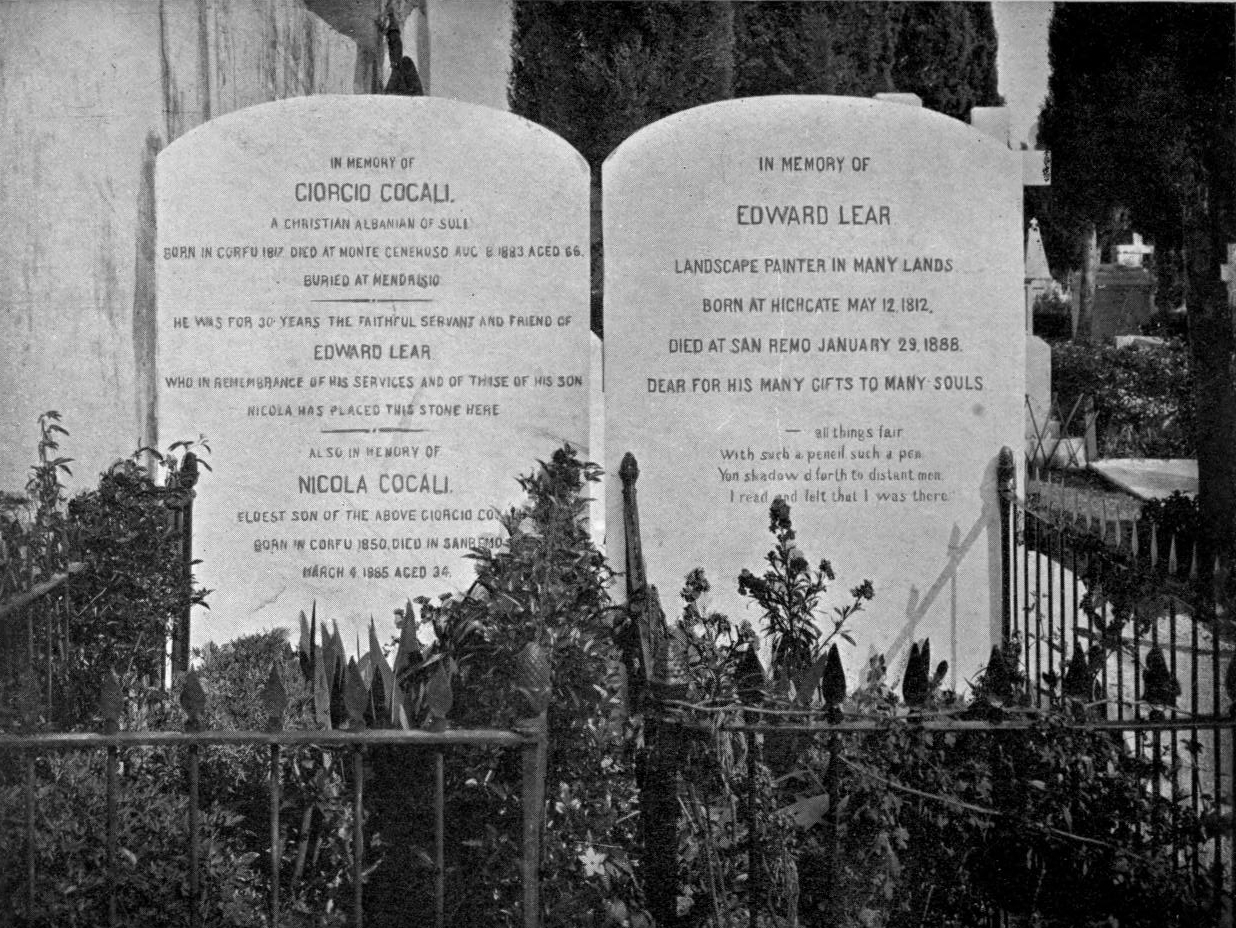
Lear's grave in San Remo, Italy, where he is buried alongside Giorgio Cocali, "A Christian Albanian of Suli", "He was for 39 years the faithful servant and friend of Edward Lear"

After a long decline in his health, Lear died at his villa in 1888 of heart disease, which he had since at least 1870. Lear's funeral was described as a sad, lonely affair by the wife of Dr. Hassall, Lear's physician, none of Lear's many lifelong friends being able to attend.

Lear is buried in the Cemetery Foce in San Remo. On his headstone are inscribed these lines about Mount Tomohrit (in Albania) from Tennyson's poem To E.L. [Edward Lear], On His Travels in Greece:

— all things fair.
With such a pencil, such a pen.
You shadow'd forth to distant men,
I read and felt that I was there.

The centenary of his death was marked in Britain with a set of Royal Mail stamps in 1988 and an exhibition at the Royal Academy. Lear's birthplace area is now marked with a plaque at Bowman's Mews, Islington, in London, and his bicentenary during 2012 was celebrated with a variety of events, exhibitions and lectures in venues across the world including an International Owl and Pussycat Day on his birth anniversary.

== Author ==
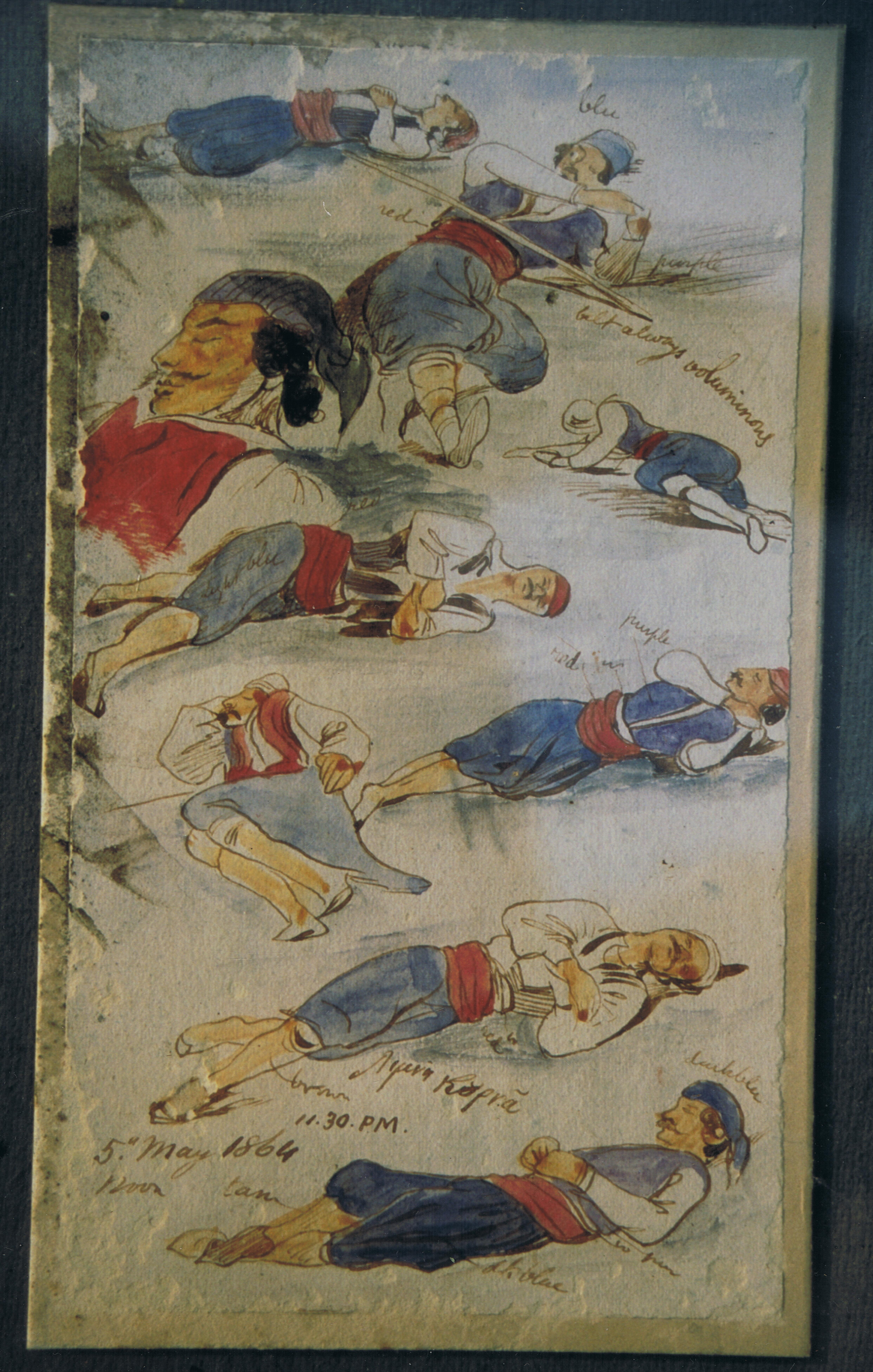
Lear sketches dated 15 May 1864, from Paddy Leigh Fermor's collection

In 1846, Lear published The Book of Nonsense, a volume of limericks which went through three editions and helped popularise the form and the genre of literary nonsense. In 1871, he published Nonsense Songs, Stories, Botany and Alphabets, which included the nonsense song "The Owl and the Pussy-Cat", which he wrote for the children of his patron Edward Stanley, 13th Earl of Derby. Many other works followed.

Lear's nonsense books were quite popular during his lifetime, but a rumour developed that "Edward Lear" was merely a pseudonym, and the books' true author was the man to whom Lear had dedicated the works, his patron the Earl of Derby. Promoters of this rumour offered as evidence that both men were named Edward, and that "Lear" is an anagram of "Earl".

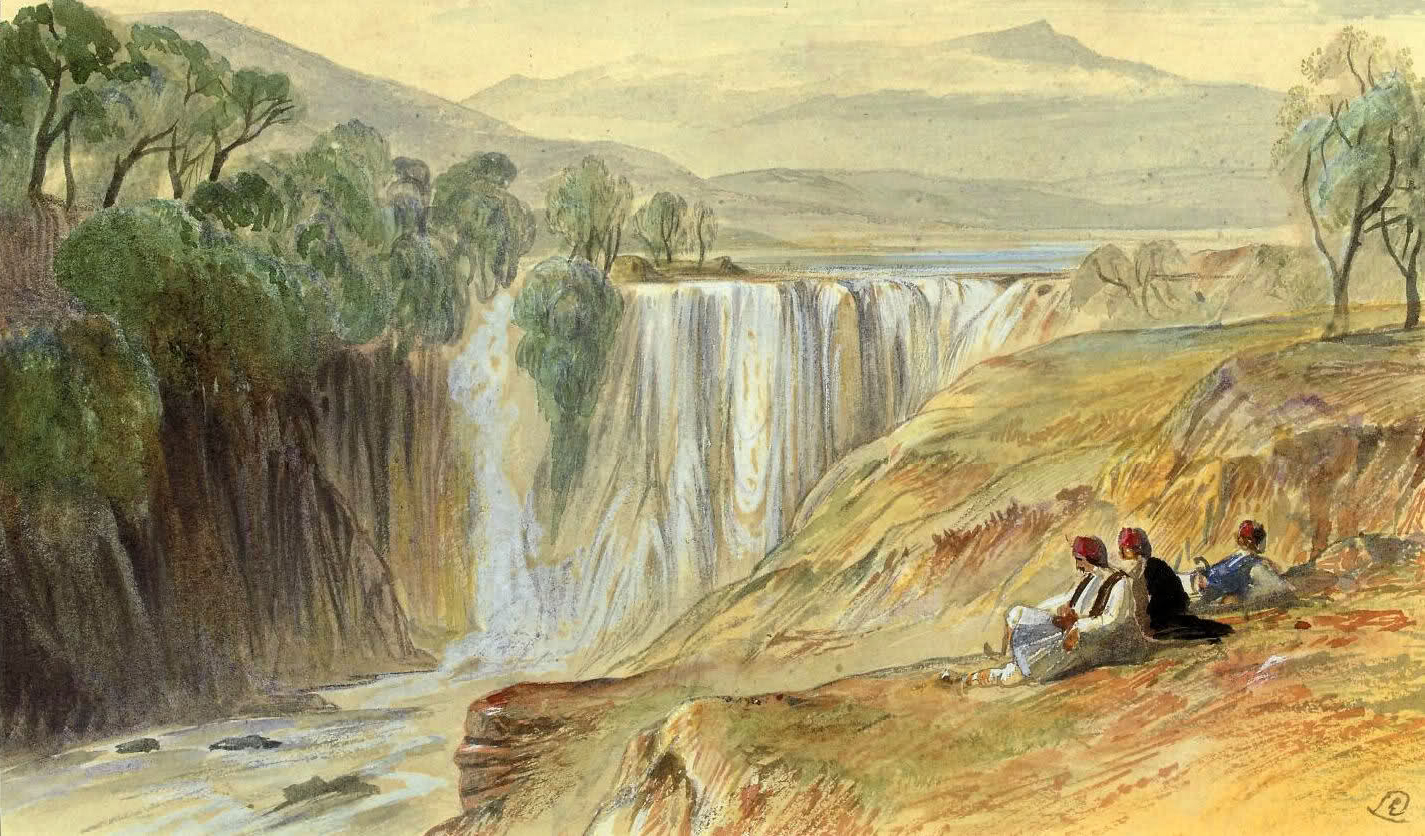
The falls of the Kalama, Albania 1851

Lear's nonsense works are distinguished by a facility of verbal invention and a poet's delight in the sounds of words, both real and imaginary. A stuffed rhinoceros becomes a "diaphanous doorscraper". A "blue Boss-Woss" plunges into "a perpendicular, spicular, orbicular, quadrangular, circular depth of soft mud". His heroes are Quangle-Wangles, Pobbles, and Jumblies. One of his most famous verbal inventions, the phrase "runcible spoon", occurs in the closing lines of "The Owl and the Pussy-Cat" and is now found in many English dictionaries.

They dined on mince and slices of quince,
Which they ate with a runcible spoon;
And hand in hand, on the edge of the sand
They danced by the light of the moon,
The moon,
The moon,
They danced by the light of the moon.

— lines 27–33

Though known for his neologisms, Lear used a number of other devices in his works in order to defy reader expectations. For example, "Cold Are the Crabs" conforms to the sonnet tradition until its dramatically foreshortened last line.

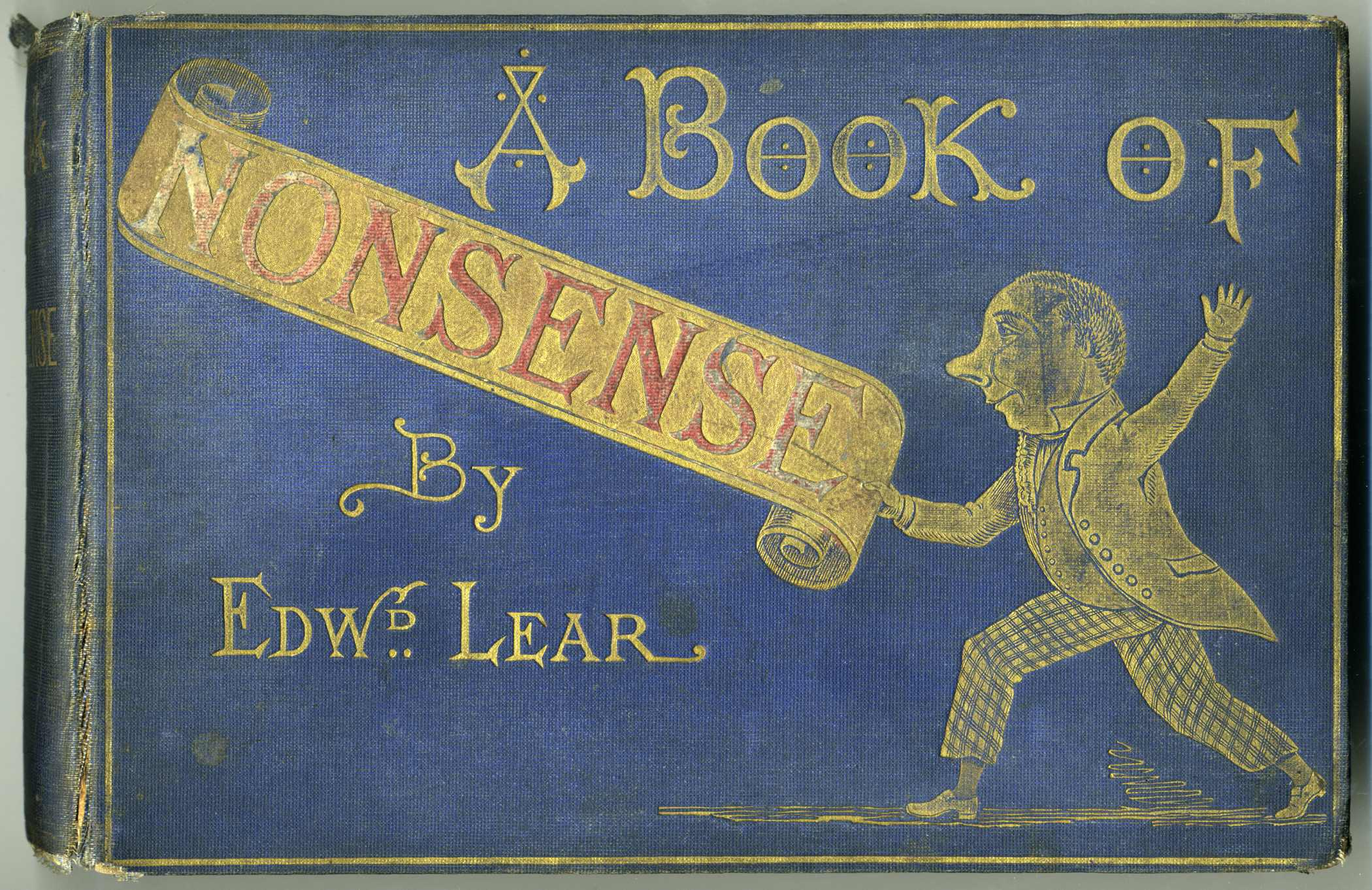
A Book of Nonsense (c. 1875 James Miller edition) by Edward Lear

Today, limericks are invariably typeset as five lines. Lear's limericks, however, were published in a variety of formats; it appears that Lear wrote them in manuscript in as many lines as there was room for beneath the picture. For the first three editions, most are typeset as, respectively, two, five, and three lines. The cover of one edition bears an entire limerick typeset in two lines:

There was an Old Derry down Derry, who loved to see little folks merry;
So he made them a Book, and with laughter they shook, at the fun of that Derry down Derry!

In Lear's limericks, the first and last lines usually end with the same word rather than rhyming. For the most part they are truly nonsensical and devoid of any punch line or point. They are completely free of the bawdiness with which the verse form is now associated. A typical thematic element is the presence of a callous and critical "they". An example of a typical Lear limerick:

There was an Old Man of Aôsta
Who possessed a large Cow, but he lost her;
But they said, "Don't you see she has run up a tree,
You invidious Old Man of Aôsta?"

Lear's self-description in verse, How Pleasant to know Mr. Lear, ends with this stanza, a reference to his own mortality:

He reads, but he cannot speak, Spanish,
He cannot abide ginger-beer:
Ere the days of his pilgrimage vanish,
How pleasant to know Mr. Lear!

— Stanza 8 (lines 29–32)

Five of Lear's limericks from the Book of Nonsense (in the 1946 Italian translation by Carlo Izzo) were set to music for choir a cappella by Goffredo Petrassi in 1952.

== Portrayals ==
Edward Lear has been played in radio dramas by Andrew Sachs in The Need for Nonsense by Julia Blackburn (BBC Radio 4, 9 February 2009) and by Derek Jacobi in By the Coast of Coromandel by Lavinia Murray (BBC Radio 4, 21 December 2011). He was portrayed on television by Robert Lang in "Edward Lear: On the Edge of the Sand" a special episode of The Natural World, BBC2 14 April 1985.

== In popular culture ==
Lear's written work was used extensively in the short-lived The Tomfoolery Show, a Saturday morning cartoon that was produced by Rankin-Bass and broadcast on NBC from 1970 to 1971. A Beach Full of Shells, the 20th album by musician Al Stewart pays tribute in the song "Mr. Lear", celebrating Foss the cat and many events from Lear's life.

== Works ==
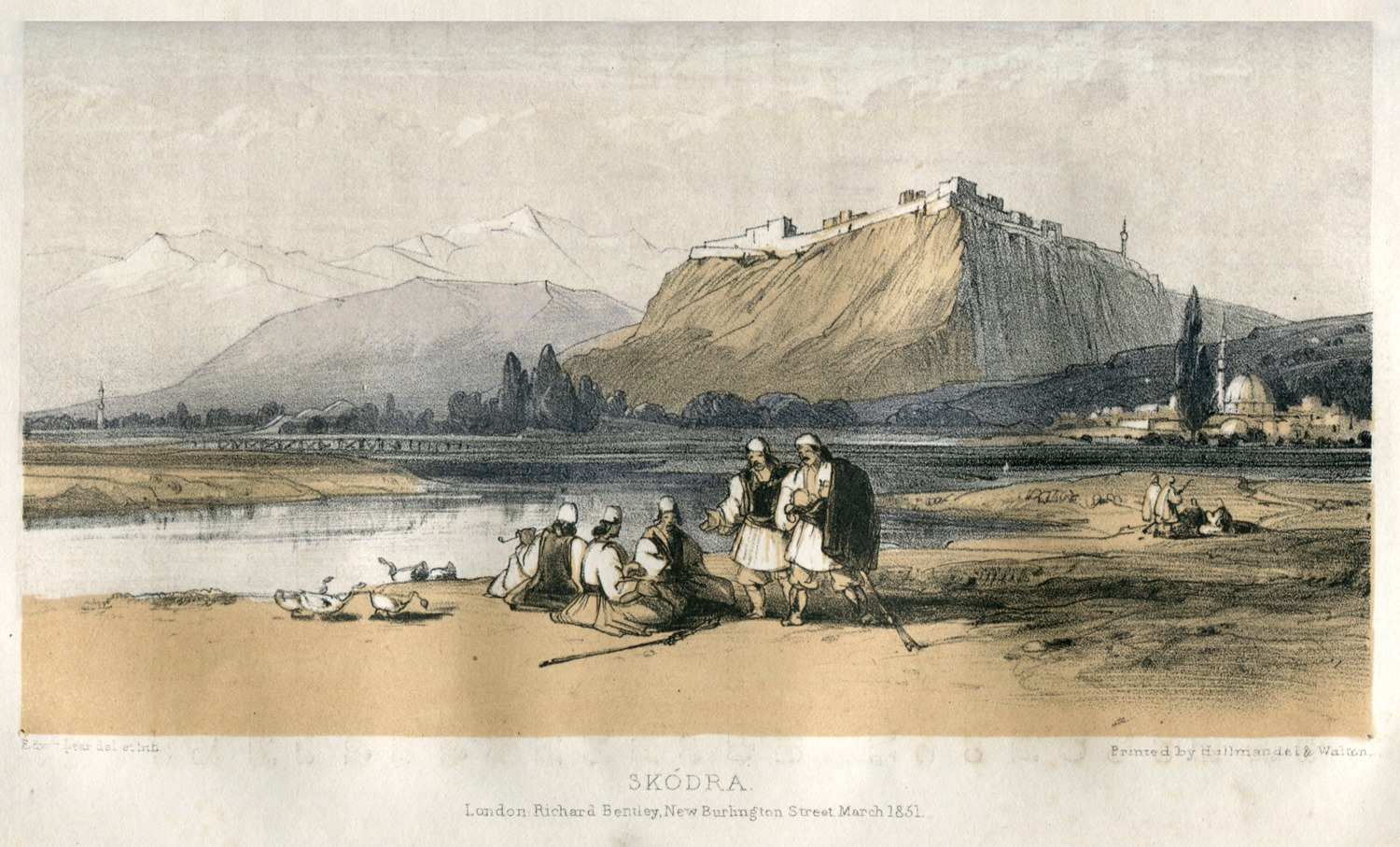
Shkodra depicted by Edward Lear: Albanians smoking by the river Drin, with the Rozafa Castle and the Lead Mosque in the background, 4 October 1848

=== Books ===
- Illustrations of the Family of Psittacidae, or Parrots (1832)
- Views in Rome and its Environs (1841)
- Gleanings from the Menagerie and Aviary at Knowsley Hall (1846)
- A Book of Nonsense (1846; revised and expanded in 1855 and 1861)
- Illustrated Excursions in Italy (1846)
- Journals of a Landscape Painter in Albania, etc. (1851)
- Journals of a Landscape Painter in Southern Calabria, etc. (1852)
- Poems and Songs by Alfred Tennyson (1853, 1859, 1860). Twelve total musical settings published, each being for a Tennyson poem.
- History of the Seven Families of the Lake Pipplepopple (1865), illustrated manuscript now in the British Library
- Journal of a Landscape Painter in Corsica (1870)
- Nonsense Songs, Stories, Botany, and Alphabets (1871)
- Tortoises, Terrapins, and Turtles (1872), introduction by J. E. Gray
- More Nonsense Pictures, Rhymes, Botany, etc. (1872)
- The Quangle-Wangle's Hat (1876)
- Laughable Lyrics: A Fresh Book of Nonsense Poems, Songs, Botany, etc. (1877)

=== Illustrations ===
- Mount Timohorit, Albania (1848)
- Argos from Mycenae (1884), now in the collection of Trinity College, Cambridge

=== Posthumous publications and editions ===
- Edward Lear's Nonsense Books (1888)
- Poems of Alfred, Lord Tennyson, illustrations by Edward Lear (1889)
- Facsimile of A Nonsense Alphabet (text and illustrations from 1849, but not published until 1926)
- Edward Lear's Nonsense Omnibus (1943)
- Edward Lear's Parrots by Brian Reade (Duckworth, 1949), includes 12 coloured plates from Lear's Psittacidae
- Edward Lear in Greece: Journals of a Landscape Painter in Greece and Albania (1965)
- The Scroobious Pip, unfinished at his death, but completed by Ogden Nash and illustrated by Nancy Ekholm Burkert (1968)
- The Dong with a Luminous Nose (from Laughable Lyrics), illustrated by Edward Gorey (Young Scott Books, NY, 1969)
- Edward Lear: The Corfu Years. A Chronicle Presented Through His Letters and Journals (1988) ISBN 0-907978-25-8
- Edward Lear's Tennyson, ed. Ruth Pitman (1988)

== Archival collections ==
The largest collection by far of Edward Lear original drawings resides in the Printing and Graphic Arts Collection at Houghton Library. Additional major Lear collections may be found at the Yale Center for British Art, the Liverpool Libraries, and Gennadius Library in Athens.

== Illustrations ==
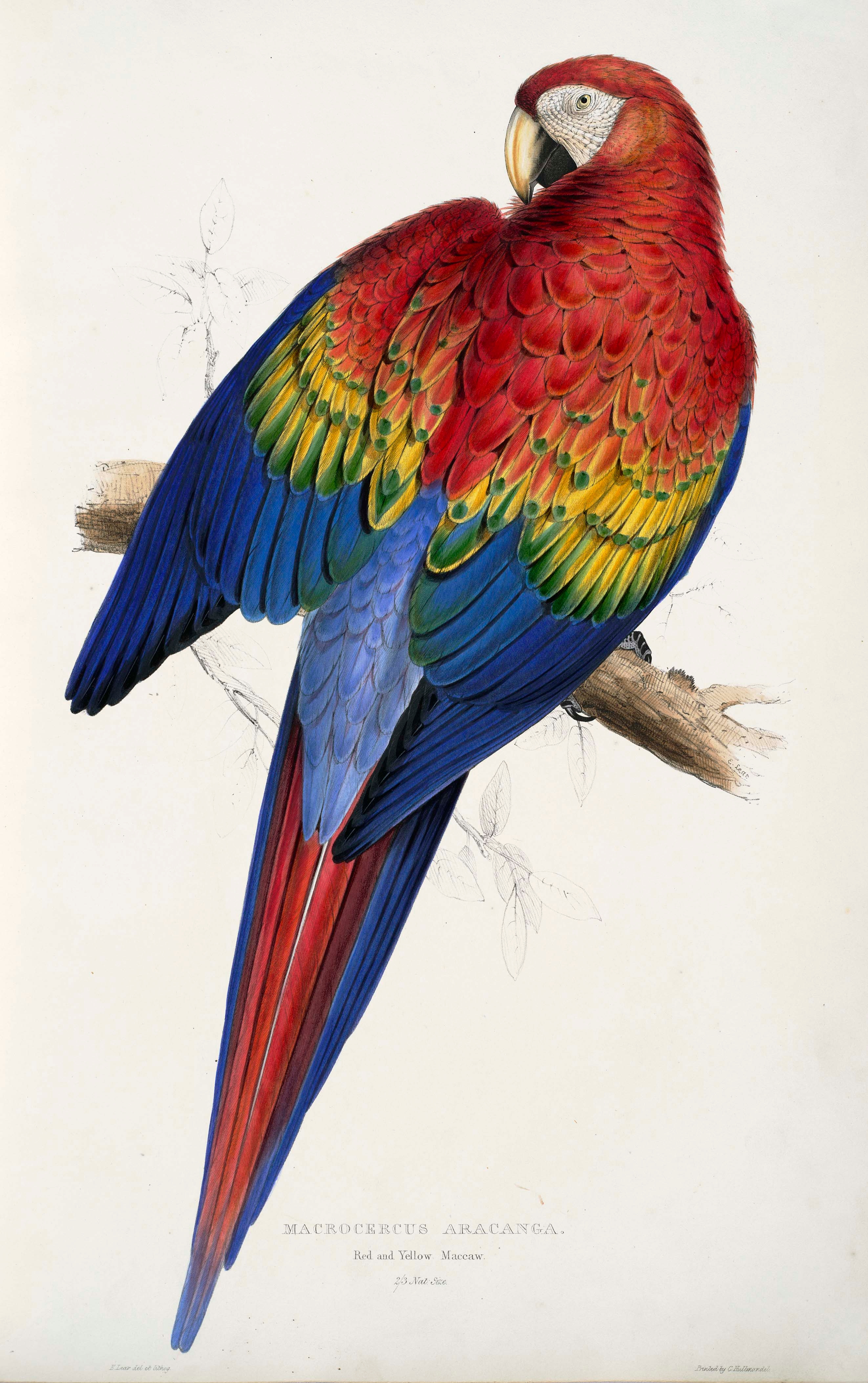
Ara macao from his first book, Illustrations of the Family of Psittacidae, or Parrots, 1832

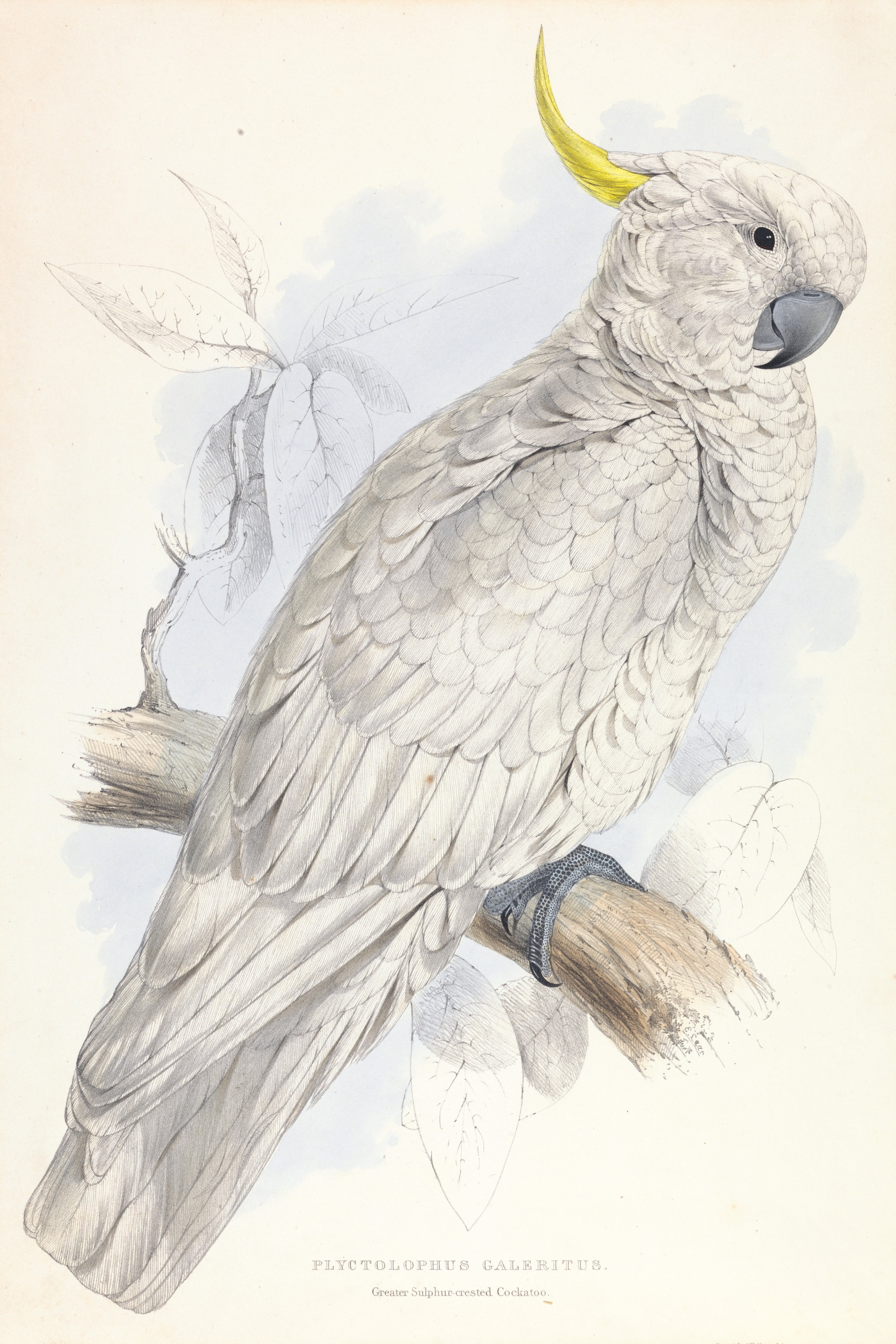
Greater sulphur-crested cockatoo in Illustrations of the Family of Psittacidae, or Parrots, 1832

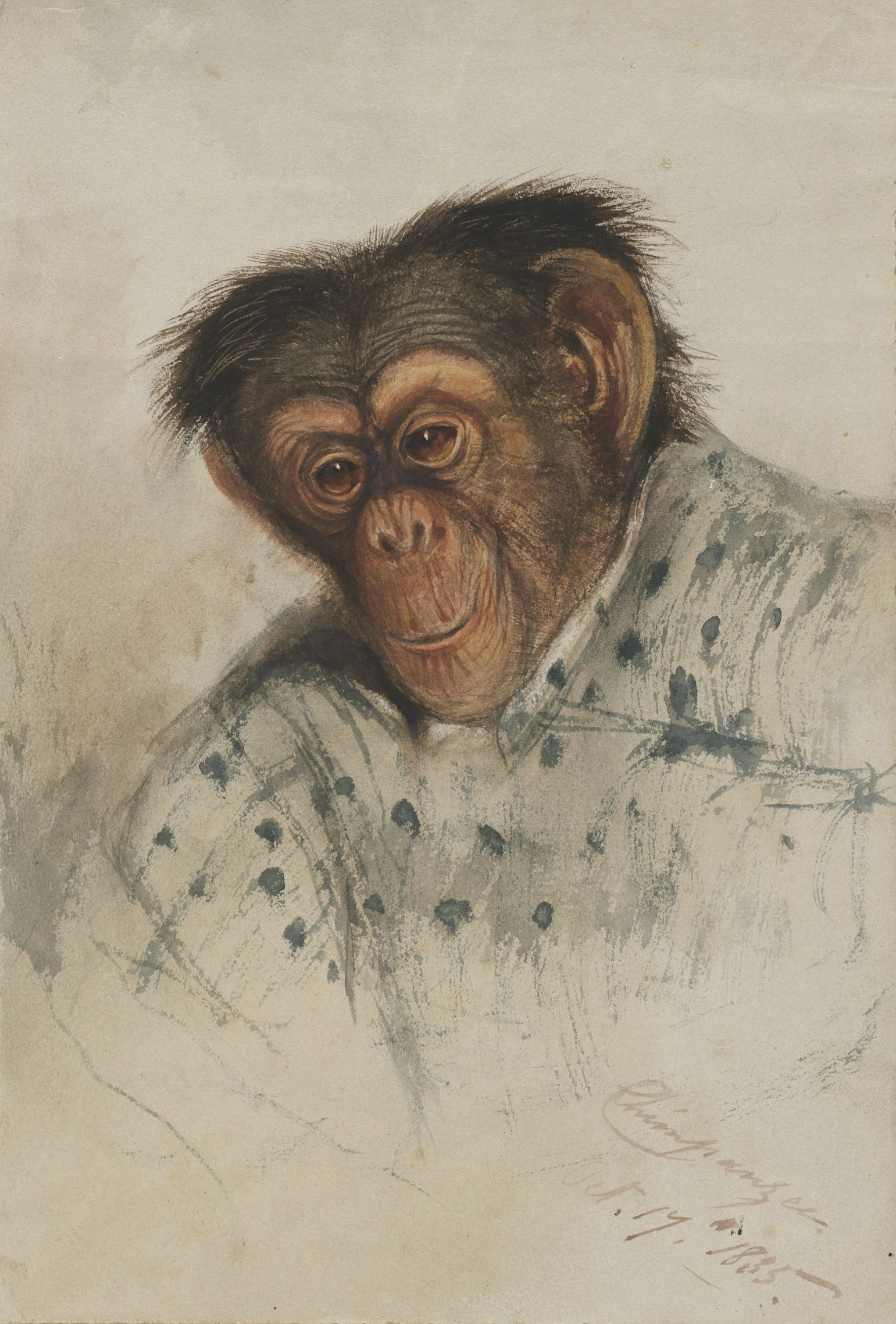
Chimpanzee, 1835

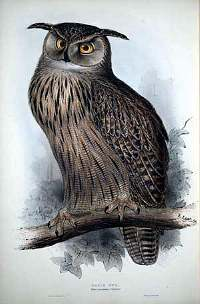
Eagle Owl, Edward Lear, 1837

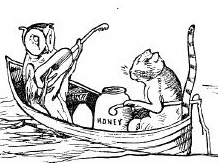
Another Edward Lear owl, in his more familiar style

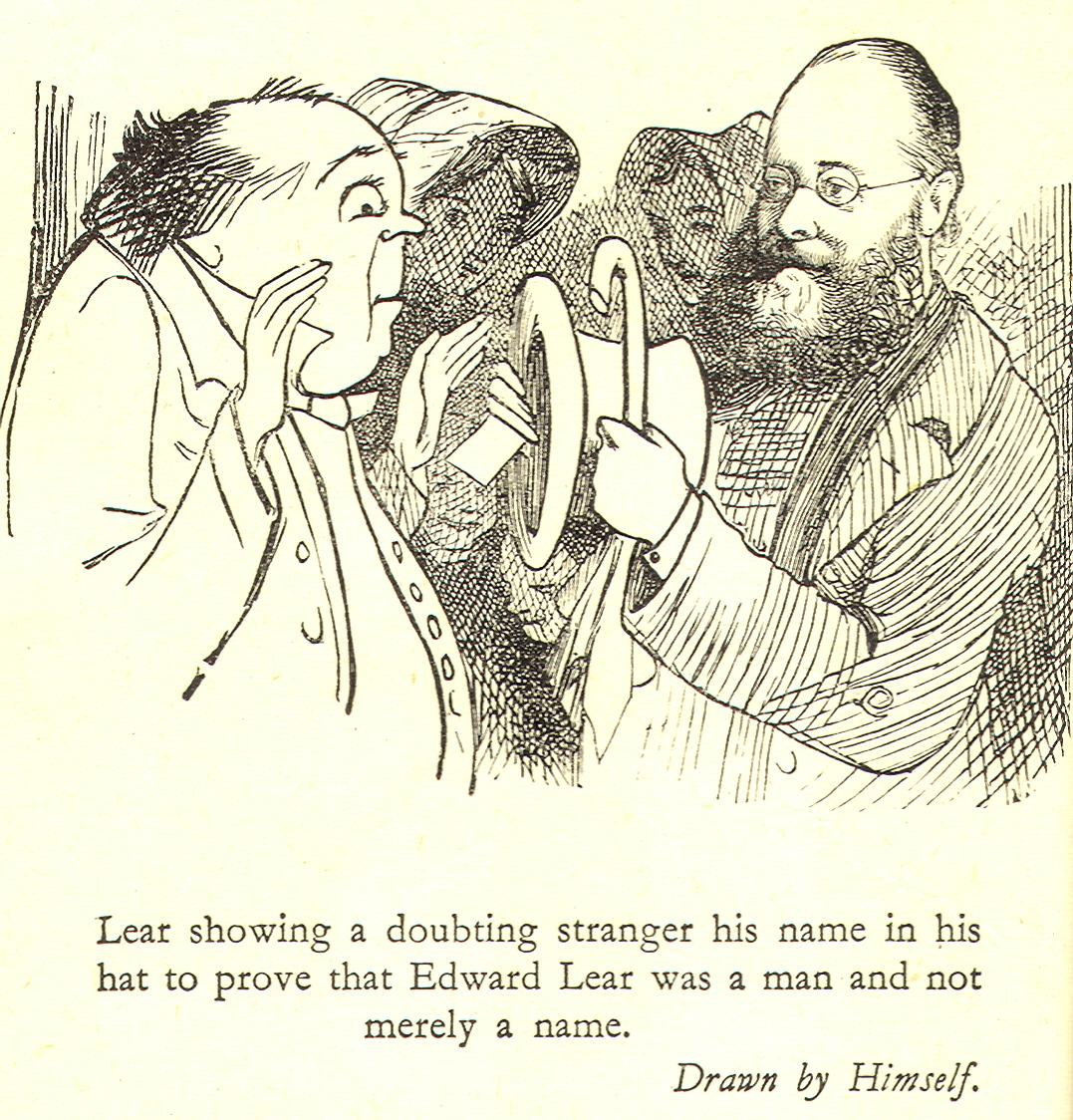
Lear self-portrait, illustrating a real incident when he encountered a stranger who claimed that "Edward Lear" was merely a pseudonym. Lear (on the right) is showing the stranger (left) the inside of his hat, with his name in the lining.

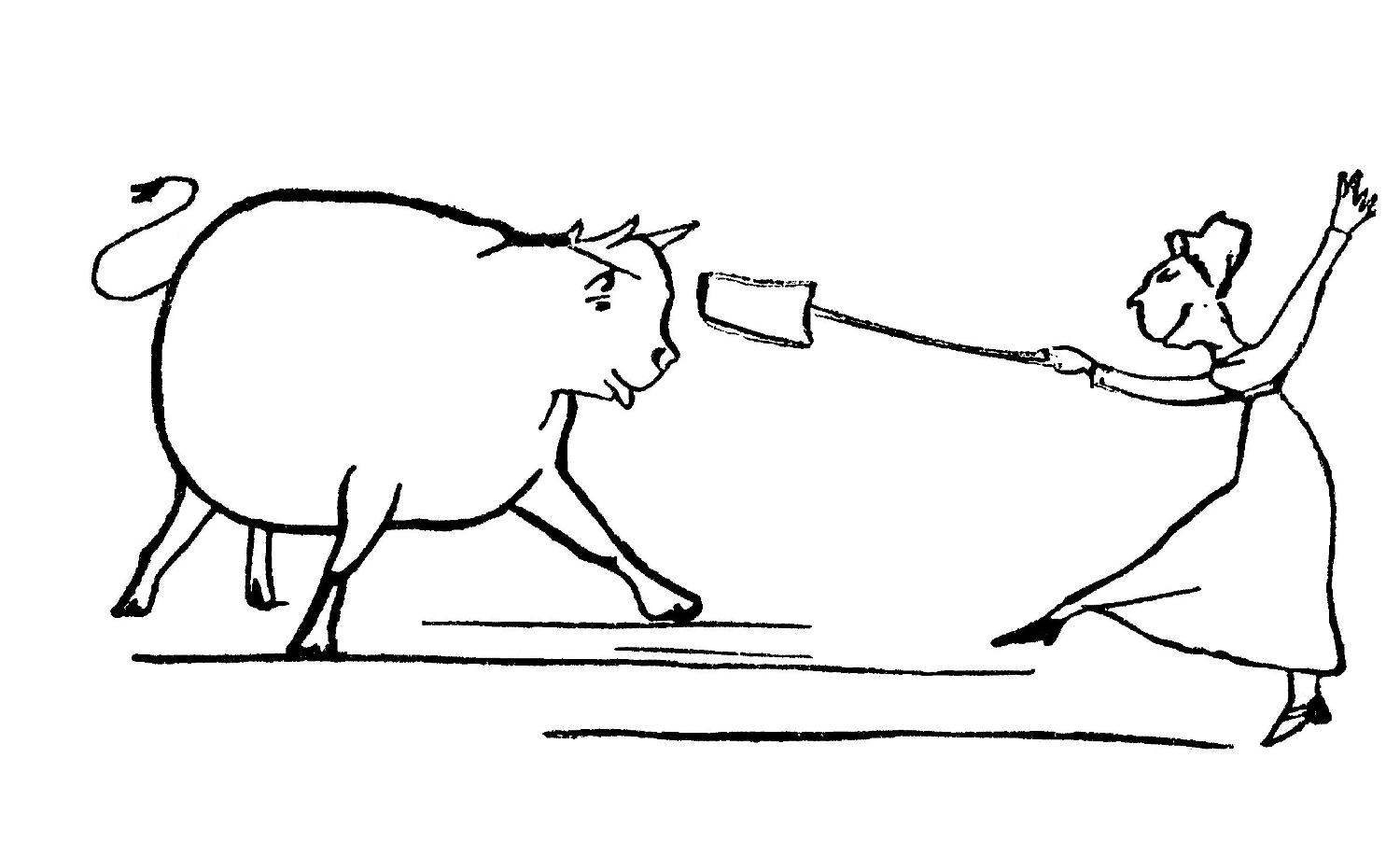
Illustration by Edward Lear for "There was a Young Lady of Hull"

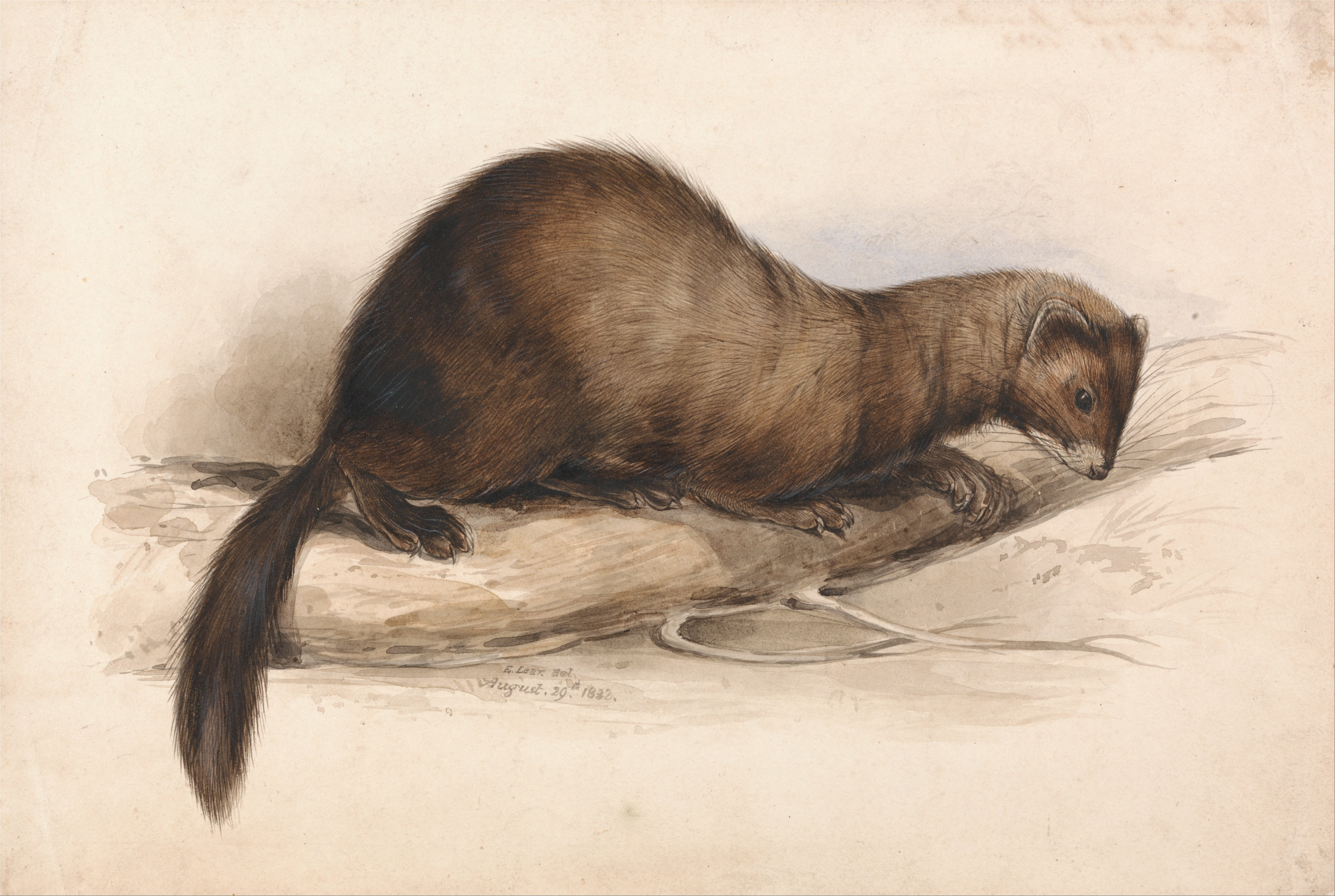
A Weasel

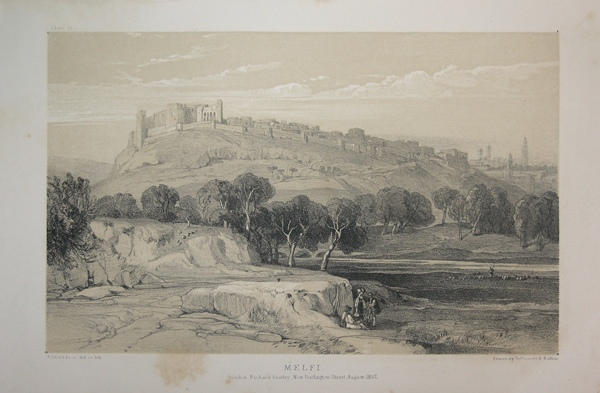
Lithograph of Melfi, Italian city in the Basilicata region

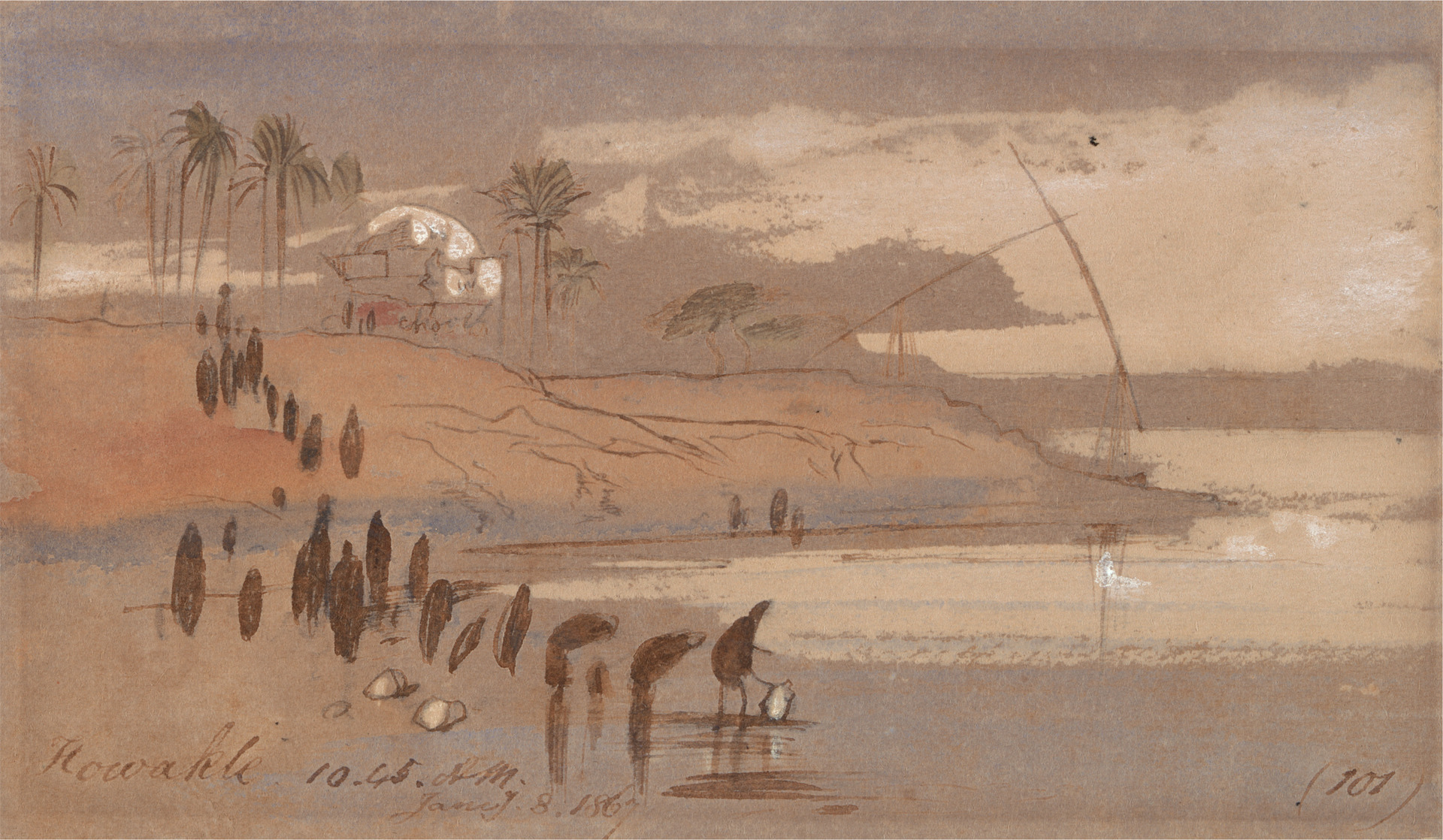
Howatke, Edward Lear, 1867

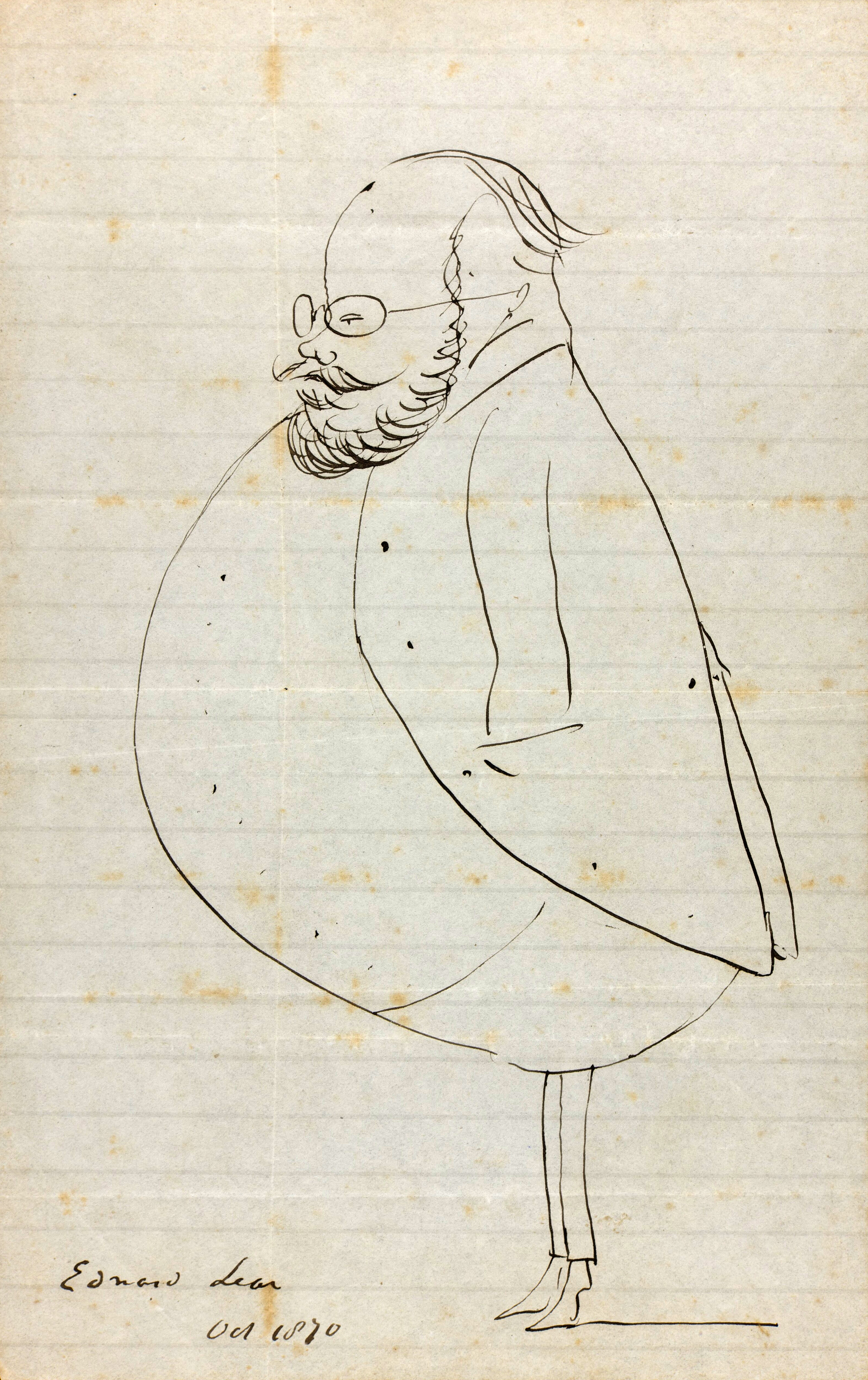
Self-caricature (1870)

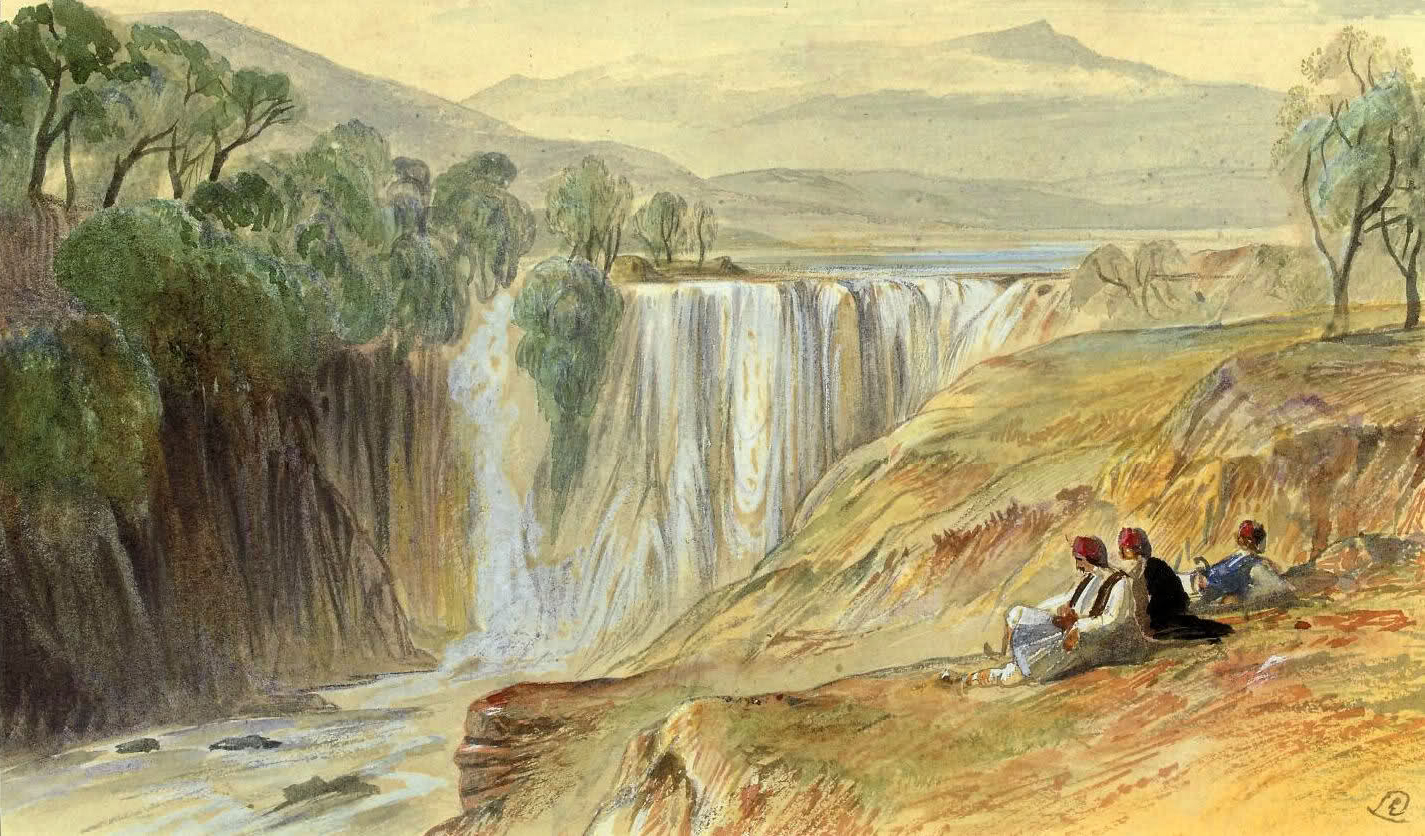
The Falls of the Kalama Albania (1851)
