= Gostak =

Meaningless noun

"Gostak", a meaningless noun, occurs in the phrase "the gostak distims the doshes", which exemplifies how it is possible to derive meaning from the syntax of a sentence even if the referents of the terms are entirely unknown. It is an example of a nonce word.

The phrase, coined in 1903 by Andrew Ingraham, became popularised through its quotation in 1923 by C. K. Ogden and I. A. Richards in their book The Meaning of Meaning, and has since been referenced in a number of cultural contexts.

== History ==
Coined in 1903 by Andrew Ingraham, the sentence became more widely known through its quotation in 1923 by C. K. Ogden and I. A. Richards in their book The Meaning of Meaning (p. 46).

Ogden and Richards refer to Ingraham as an "able but little known writer", and quote his following dialogue:

"Suppose someone to assert: The gostak distims the doshes. You do not know what this means; nor do I. But if we assume that it is English, we know that the doshes are distimmed by the gostak. We know too that one distimmer of doshes is a gostak. If, moreover, the doshes are galloons, we know that some galloons are distimmed by the gostak. And so we may go on, and so we often do go on."

== Deriving meaning ==
This can be seen in the following dialogue:

Q: What is the gostak?
A: The gostak is what distims the doshes.
Q: What's distimming?
A: Distimming is what the gostak does to the doshes.
Q: Okay, but what are doshes?
A: The doshes are what the gostak distims.

In this case, it is possible to describe the grammatical and syntactical relationships between the terms in the sentence — that gostak is a noun subject, distimming is a transitive verb, and doshes is a plural direct object — even though there is no fact of the matter about what a gostak or distimming or doshes actually are.

== Cultural references ==
The phrase appears in a number of subsequent cultural contexts including:

=== Science fiction ===
Miles Breuer wrote a story, published in Amazing Stories for March 1930 and now considered a classic, titled "The Gostak and the Doshes" whose protagonist travels to an alternate Earth in which the phrase is a political slogan, one that induces sufficient umbrage throughout the populace to declare justified, righteous war. The protagonist attempts to discern the meaning, but every definition he receives is some rewording of the phrase. Other writers have picked up on the reference, notably David Gerrold.

=== Interactive fiction ===
The phrase is the namesake of an interactive fiction game called The Gostak, written by Carl Muckenhoupt. Most of the text of the game is in an entirely unknown language (fundamentally English in syntax and grammar, but with much of the vocabulary and even idiomatic constructions changed) which the player must decipher, not only to understand the game's text but also to type commands in the same language. For example, the game opens with the following text:

"Finally, here you are. At the delcot of tondam, where doshes deave. But the doshery lutt is crenned with glauds.

Glauds! How rorm it would be to pell back to the bewl and distunk them, distunk the whole delcot, let the drokes discren them.

But you are the gostak. The gostak distims the doshes. And no glaud will vorl them from you."

The Gostak won the 2001 XYZZY Awards for Best Use of Medium and Best Individual Puzzle.

== See also ==
- Sepulka
- Colorless green ideas sleep furiously
- Glokaya kuzdra
- Jabberwocky
- Nadsat
- Part-of-speech tagging
- Philosophy of language
- Pseudoword
- Semantics
- Stanley Unwin
