= Vernon Green =

American musician

Vernon Green (May 1, 1937 – December 24, 2000) was the American leader of the rhythm and blues band The Medallions. He wrote the 1954 song "The Letter", which contained the nonsense lyric "the puppeteers of love." According to an interview with Green, "puppeteum" was "a term I coined to mean a secret paper-doll fantasy figure [thus puppet], who would be my everything and bear my children."

Green died on December 24, 2000, in Los Angeles, California, from complications of a stroke he suffered earlier that year.
