= Glokaya kuzdra =

Artificial phrase in Russian language without meaning

Glokaya kuzdra (Russian: Глокая куздра) is a reference to a Russian language phrase constructed from non-existent words in a grammatically proper way, similar to the English language phrases using the pseudoword "gostak". It was suggested by Russian linguist Lev Shcherba. The full phrase is: "Гло́кая ку́здра ште́ко будлану́ла бо́кра и курдя́чит бокрёнка" (Glokaya kuzdra shteko budlanula bokra i kurdyachit bokryonka). In the phrase, all word stems (glok-, kuzdr-, shtek-, budl-, bokr-, kurd-) are meaningless, but all affixes are real, used in a grammatically correct way and — which is the point — provide enough semantics for the phrase to be a perceived description of some dramatic action with a specified plot but with unknown actors. An English translation (only syntax and no semantics) could be: "The glocky kuzdra shteckly budled the bocker and is kurdyaking the bockerling."

Shcherba used it in his lectures in linguistics to emphasize the importance of grammar in acquiring foreign languages. The phrase was popularized by Lev Uspensky in his popular-science linguistics book A Word about Words. Shcherba himself never published this phrase, but a number of linguists before Uspensky vouched for the origin of the phrase. Although its text varied, Uspensky's version is considered to be canonical. The phrase was quoted numerous times by notable linguists. In particular, they noticed that Uspensky's "deciphering" of the phrase is non-unique, due to high variability of the syntax of the Russian language. Still, it is the first one that comes to the mind of various categories of people.

== See also ==
- Jabberwocky
- Colorless green ideas sleep furiously
- Wug Test
