= Pseudoword =

Type of non-word

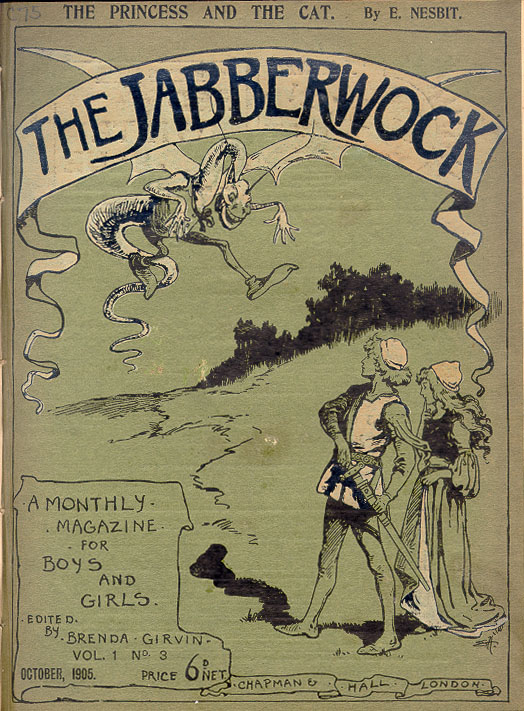
Cover of the October 1905 issue of Jabberwock: a Monthly Magazine for Boys and Girls

A pseudoword is a unit of speech or text that appears to be an actual word in a certain language, while in fact it has no meaning. It is a specific type of nonce word, or even more narrowly a nonsense word, composed of a combination of phonemes which nevertheless conforms to the language's phonotactic rules. It is thus a kind of vocable: utterable but meaningless.

Such words lacking a meaning in a certain language or absent in any text corpus or dictionary can be the result of (the interpretation of) a truly random signal, but there will often be an underlying deterministic source, as is the case for examples like jabberwocky and galumph (both coined in a nonsense poem by Lewis Carroll), dord (a ghost word published due to a mistake), ciphers, and typos.

A string of nonsensical words may be described as gibberish. Word salad, in contrast, may contain legible and intelligible words but without semantic or syntactic correlation or coherence.

== Characteristics ==
Within linguistics, a pseudoword is defined specifically as respecting the phonotactic restrictions of a language. That is, it does not include sounds or series of sounds that do not exist in that language: it is easily pronounceable for speakers of the language. When reading pseudowords, some cite the need to reflect on the real words that are "friendly" and "unfriendly". For instance, "tave" can be read easily due to the number of its friendly words such as cave, pave, and wave. Also, when written down, a pseudoword does not include strings of characters that are not permissible in the spelling of the target language. "Vonk" is a pseudoword in English, while "dfhnxd" is not. The latter is an example of a nonword. Nonwords are contrasted with pseudowords in that they are not pronounceable, and, by that, their spelling could not be the spelling of a real word.

Pseudowords are created in one of two ways. The first method involves changing at least one letter in a word. The second method uses various bigrams and trigrams and combines them. Both methods evaluate certain criteria to compare the pseudoword to another real word. The more that a given pseudoword matches a word in terms of criteria, the stronger the word is.

Pseudowords are also sometimes called wug words in the context of psycholinguistic experiments. This is because wug [wʌg] was one such pseudoword used by Jean Berko Gleason in her wug test 1958 experiments. Words like wug, which could have been a perfectly acceptable word in English but is not due to an accidental gap, were presented to children. The experimenter would then prompt the children to create a plural for wug, which was almost invariably wugs [wʌgz]. The experiments were designed to see if English morphophonemics would be applied by children to novel words. They revealed that even at a very young age, children have already internalized many of the complex features of their language.

A logatome is a short pseudoword or just a syllable which is used in acoustic experiments to examine speech recognition.

== Linguistic studies ==
Experiments involving pseudonyms have led to the discovery of the pseudoword effect, a phenomenon where non-words that are similar in spelling to real words give rise to more confusion, or "hits and false alarms," than other similar-spelling yet real words. This is theorized to be caused by human's use of semantic meaning to differentiate between words that look similar, and that the pseudoword effect is caused by a familiarity-based process.

Pseudowords are also often used in studies involving aphasia and other cognitive deficits. Particularly Broca’s aphasia has been associated with difficulties in processing pseudowords. In aphasia studies, they are often used to measure syllable frequency by having patients attempt to pronounce them. Also, patients with left hemisphere damage (LHD) tend to have significantly greater difficulty writing pseudowords than those with right hemisphere damage. This specific deficit is known as the lexicality effect. It occurs in the presence of perisylvian, rather than extrasylvian, damage in the left hemisphere.

== Pseudowords and reading ability ==
In testing the ability of beginning readers, pseudowords are used due to their characteristics as pronounceable non-words. Those with reading disabilities have a more difficult time pronouncing pseudowords. Because pseudowords are made using common syllables, it might be obvious that trouble in pronouncing them would be connected to trouble pronouncing real words. From these findings, nonsense word fluency is now considered to be a basic early literacy indicator.

A standardized test for beginning readers, Dynamic Indicators of Basic Early Literacy Skills (DIBELS), shows high scores in pseudoword pronunciation being correlated with high scores in the reading of authentic words. Due to these findings, often pseudowords are used to train early readers to strengthen their morphological knowledge.

There is evidence that suggests that higher scores on these tests, such as the Word-Pseudoword Reading Competence Test are highly correlated with other more general standardized tests, such as the Test for School Achievement and its subtests. Pseudoword pronunciation and spelling are associated with general reading comprehension and, more importantly, general, education-based achievement.

== Nonsense syllables ==
A logatome or nonsense syllable is a short pseudoword consisting most of the time of just one syllable which has no meaning of its own. Examples of English logatomes are the nonsense words snarp or bluck.

Like other pseudowords, logatomes obey all the phonotactic rules of a specific language.

Logatomes are used in particular in acoustic experiments. They are also used in experiments in the psychology of learning as a way to examine speech recognition. and in experimental psychology, especially the psychology of learning and memory.

Nonsense syllables were first introduced by Hermann Ebbinghaus in his experiments on the learning of lists. His intention was that they would form a standard stimulus so that experiments would be reproducible. However, with increasing use it became apparent that different nonsense syllables were learned at very different rates, even when they had the same superficial structure. Glaze introduced the concept of association value to describe these differences, which turned out to be reliable between people and situations. Since Glaze's time, experiments using nonsense syllables typically control association value in order to reduce variability in results between stimuli.

Nonsense syllables can vary in structure. The most used are the so-called CVC syllables, composed of a consonant, a vowel, and a consonant. These have the advantage that nearly all are pronounceable, that is, they fit the phonotactics of any language that uses closed syllables, such as English and German. They are often described as "CVC trigrams", reflecting their three-letter structure. Obviously, many other structures are possible, and can be described on the same principles, e.g. VC, VCV, CVCV. But the CVC trigrams have been studied most intensively; for example, Glaze determined association values for 2019 of them.

The term nonsense syllable is widely used to describe non-lexical vocables used in music, most notably in scat singing but also in many other forms of vocal music. Although such usages do not invoke the technical issues about structure and associability that are of concern in psychology, the essential meaning of the term is the same.

== See also ==
- Covfefe
- Glokaya kuzdra
- Gostak
- Hapax legomenon
- Language acquisition
- Lorem ipsum
- Neologism
- Placeholder name
- Speaking in tongues
