= Steve Miller Band discography =

Cataloging of published recordings by Steve Miller Band

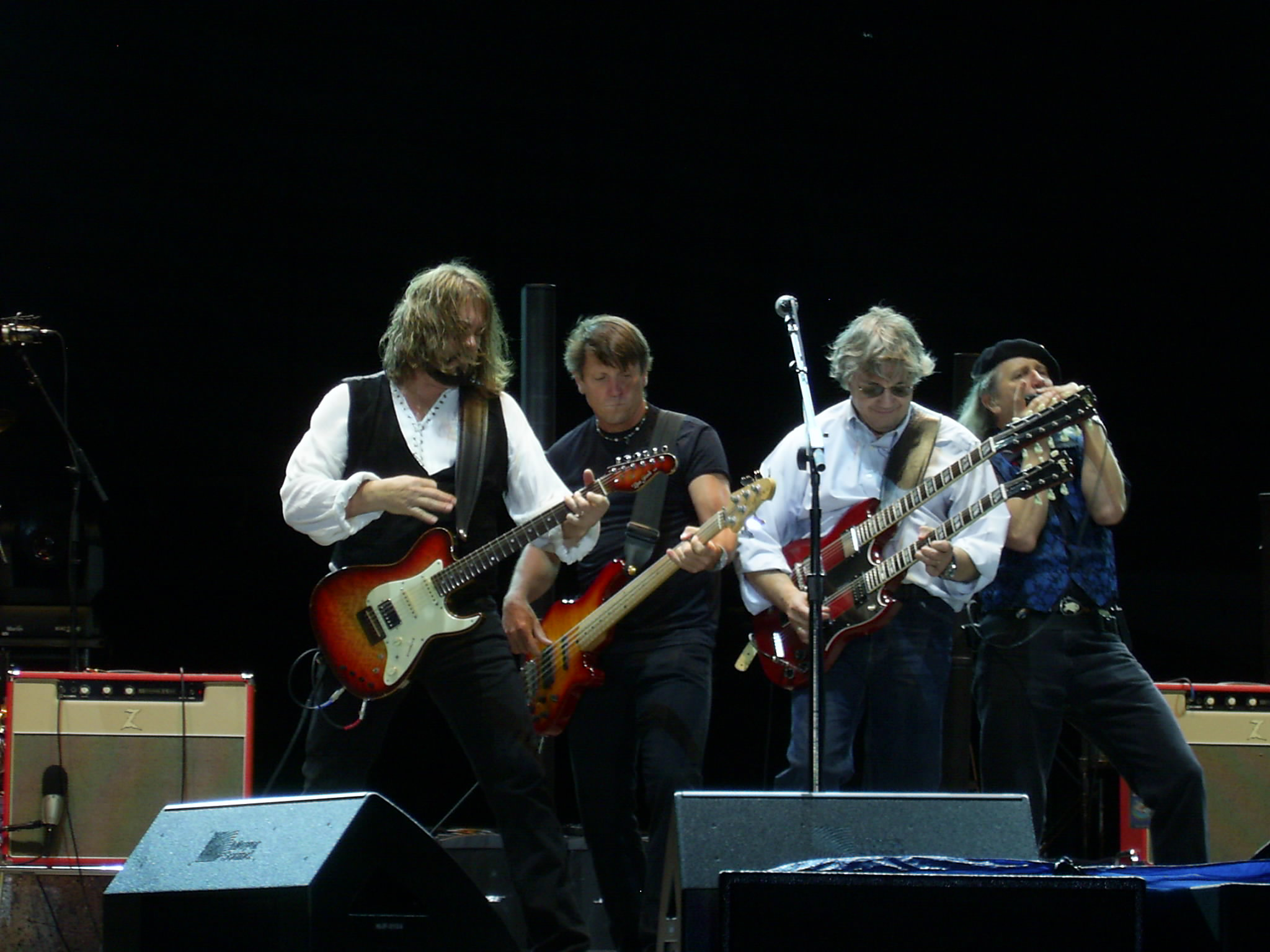
- Studio albums: 18
- Live albums: 6
- Compilation albums: 11
- Singles: 30
- Video albums: 3

The discography of American rock group Steve Miller Band is composed of 18 studio albums (including one solo album by Steve Miller), six live albums, 11 compilation albums, three video albums and 30 singles.

Originally called the Steve Miller Blues Band, the group first made its mark as a psychedelic blues rock band in San Francisco. They went through a fallow period commercially in the early seventies before coming back with the hit album The Joker and the song of the same name in late 1973, followed by the band's two most successful studio albums in 1976 and 1977, Fly Like an Eagle and Book of Dreams. In 1978, they released their biggest selling album in North America, Greatest Hits 1974–78, which has been certified 16× Platinum in the United States and diamond in Canada. Although the 1981 release Circle of Love was less successful than the two preceding studio albums, the popularity of 1982's Abracadabra, which included the worldwide hit single of the same name, more than made up for it. The band's studio releases became more infrequent at this point, with the biggest gap in albums being between 1993's Wide River and 2010's Bingo!. Their most recent studio album is 2011's Let Your Hair Down.

The band's releases have been most successful in North America: two number-one albums in Canada, three number one singles in the United States, two number one singles in Canada, three multi-platinum awards in the United States, and selling over 24 million albums in the United States alone. The band's most successful singles have been "The Joker", which peaked in the top 10 of the trade charts of six countries—reaching number one in four, and "Abracadabra", which made the top 10 in five countries—and number one in two countries. Of the band's albums, 12 have reached the top 40 in the United States and seven have done the same in Canada.

== Albums ==
=== Studio albums ===
List of studio albums, with selected details, chart positions and certifications
Title	Album details	Peak chart positions									Certifications
Title	Album details	US	US R&B	AUS	CAN	GER	NLD	NZ	SWE	UK	Certifications
Children of the Future	Released: June 1968; Label: Capitol (SKAO-2920); Format: LP/8-track/Cassette	134	—	—	—	—	—	—	—	—	
Sailor^{A}	Released: October 1968; Label: Capitol (ST-2984); Format: LP/8-track/Cassette; Re-issued in 1973 as Living in the U.S.A.	24	—	—	27	—	—	—	—	—	
Brave New World^{A}	Released: June 16, 1969; Label: Capitol (SKAO-184); Format: LP/8-track/Cassette	22	—	—	38	—	—	—	—	—	
Your Saving Grace^{A}	Released: November 1969; Label: Capitol (SKAO/4XT/8XT-331); Format: LP/8-track/Cassette/	38	—	—	79	—	—	—	—	—	
Number 5	Released: July 1970; Label: Capitol (SKAO-436); Format: LP/8-track/Cassette	23	—	—	55	—	—	—	—	—	
Rock Love	Released: September 1971; Label: Capitol (SW-748); Format: LP (Live & Studio)/8-track/Cassette	82	—	—	—	—	—	—	—	—	
Recall the Beginning...A Journey from Eden	Released: March 1972; Label: Capitol (SMAS-11022); Format: LP/8-track/Cassette	109	—	—	—	—	—	—	—	—	
The Joker	Released: October 19, 1973; Label: Capitol (SMAS/4XW/8XW-11235); Format: LP/8-track/Cassette	2	—	38	1	—	—	—	—	—	RIAA: Platinum
Fly Like an Eagle	Released: May 14, 1976; Label: Capitol (ST/8XT-11497); Format: LP/8-track/Cassette	3	19	25	4	20	7	16	—	11	RIAA: 4× Platinum; BPI: Gold; MC: 2× Platinum
Book of Dreams^{A}	Released: May 1977; Label: Capitol (SW/4XW/8XW-11630); Format: LP/8-track/Cassette	2	—	6	1	13	4	5	11	12	RIAA: 3× Platinum; BPI: Silver; MC: Platinum
Circle of Love^{A}	Released: October 23, 1981; Label: Capitol (ST/4XT-12121); Format: LP/8-track/Cassette	26	—	48	27	—	14	38	35	—	RIAA: Gold; MC: Gold
Abracadabra^{A}	Released: June 15, 1982; Label: Capitol (ST/4XT-12216); Format: LP/8-track/Cassette	3	40	5	4	1	11	47	3	10	RIAA: Platinum; ARIA: Platinum; BPI: Silver; MC: Platinum
Italian X Rays	Released: October 1984; Label: Capitol (SJ/4XJ-12339); Format: LP/Cassette	106	—	—	88	—	—	—	49	—	
Living in the 20th Century	Released: November 1986; Label: Capitol (PJ-12445/CDP 7 46326 2); Format: LP/Cassette/CD	65	—	34	—	—	—	—	—	—	
Born 2 B Blue^{B}	Released: 1988; Label: Capitol (C1-18303); Format: LP/Cassette/CD	108	—	—	95	—	—	—	—	—	
Wide River	Released: June 8, 1993; Label: Polydor (519 441–2); Format: Cassette/CD	85	—	—	—	81	—	—	—	—	
Bingo!^{A}	Released: June 15, 2010; Label: Roadrunner (1686-177592); Format: CD	37	—	—	—	68	70	—	—	—	
Let Your Hair Down^{A}	Released: April 19, 2011; Label: Roadrunner; Format: CD	189	—	—	—	—	77	—	—	—	
"—" denotes releases that did not chart.

=== Live albums ===
List of live albums, with selected details and chart positions
Title	Album details	Peak chart positions					
Title	Album details	US	AUS	CAN	GER	NLD	UK
Steve Miller Band Live!	Released: April 1983; Label: Capitol (ST/4XT-12263); Format: LP/Cassette	125	74	89	65	40	79
King Biscuit Flower Hour Presents the Steve Miller Band^{A}	Released: July 9, 2002; Label: King Biscuit Entertainment (115); Format: Double CD	—	—	—	—	—	—
Extended Versions	Released: April 1, 2003; Label: BMG (45962); Format: CD	—	—	—	—	—	—
Steve Miller Band: Live from Chicago	Released: May 27, 2008; Label: Coming Home Media; Format: Double DVD plus CD	—	—	—	—	—	—
The Joker (Live)	Released: May 15, 2014; Label: Sailor; Format: CD/Digital download	—	—	—	—	—	—
Live at the Carousel Ballroom, San Francisco, April 1968	Released: September 8, 2014; Label: Sailor; Format: Digital download	—	—	—	—	—	—
"—" denotes releases that did not chart.

=== Compilation albums ===
List of compilation albums, with selected details, chart positions and certifications
Title	Album details	Peak chart positions					Certifications
Title	Album details	US	AUS	NLD	NZ	UK	Certifications
Anthology	Released: November 1972; Label: Capitol (SVBB-11114); Format: double LP/double boxed 8-track tape/double boxed cassette tape/CD	56	—	—	—	—	RIAA: Gold
Greatest Hits 1974–78^{A}	Released: November 1978; Label: Capitol (S00/8X00/4X00-11872); Format: LP/8-track/Cassette/CD	18	42	—	—	—	RIAA: 16× Platinum; MC: Diamond
Greatest Hits 1976–86: A Decade of American Music^{A}	Released: 11 May 1987; Label: Mercury (MERH 105); Format: LP/Cassette/CD	—	—	—	—	—	
The Best of 1968–1973	Released: 1990; Label: Capitol (EST/TCEST/CDEST 2133); Format: LP/Cassette/CD	—	—	—	32	34	RIAA: Gold
Living in the U.S.A	Released: 1990; Label: Capitol; Format: Cassette/CD	—	—	—	—	—	RIAA: Gold
The Very Best of the Steve Miller Band^{A}	Released: 1991; Label: Arcade (04 6250 61); Format: CD	—	24	10	32	—	ARIA: Gold
Steve Miller Band	Released: July 26, 1994; Label: Capitol (89826); Format: CD box set	—	—	—	—	—	
Greatest Hits	Released: 1998; Label: PolyGram TV (559 240–2); Format: CD	—	—	—	—	58	
Young Hearts: Complete Greatest Hits	Released: September 16, 2003; Label: Capitol (CDP 7243 5 90509 2 8); Format: CD	37	—	93	3	—	RIAA: Gold
Ultimate Hits	Released: September 15, 2017; Label: Capitol (B0026748-02); Format: CD	—	—	—	—	—	
Welcome to the Vault	Released: October 11, 2019; Label: Capitol, Sailor; Format: CD, download, streaming	—	—	—	—	—	
"—" denotes releases that did not chart.

== Singles ==
Year	Titles (A-side, B-side) Both sides from same album except where indicated	Peak chart positions									Certifications	Album
Year	Titles (A-side, B-side) Both sides from same album except where indicated	US	US Main.	AUS	CAN	GER	NLD	NZ	SWE	UK	Certifications	Album
1968	"Sittin' in Circles" b/w "Roll With It" (from Children of the Future)	—	—	—	—	—	—	—	—	—		Non-album track
1968	"Living in the U.S.A." b/w "Quicksilver Girl"	94	—	—	—	—	—	—	—	—		Sailor
1969	"Sitting in Circles" b/w "Dear Mary" (from Sailor)	—	—	—	—	—	—	—	—	—		Non-album track
1969	"My Dark Hour" b/w "Song for Our Ancestors" (from Sailor)	126	—	—	—	—	—	—	—	—		Brave New World
1969	"Don't Let Nobody Turn You Around" b/w "Little Girl"	—	—	—	87	—	—	—	—	—		Your Saving Grace
1970	"Going to the Country" b/w "Never Kill Another Man"	69	—	91	54	—	—	—	—	—		Number 5
1970	"Steve Miller's Midnight Tango" b/w "Going to Mexico"	117	—	—	—	—	—	—	—	—		Number 5
1971	"Rock Love" b/w "Let Me Serve You"	—	—	—	—	—	—	—	—	—		Rock Love
1972	"Fandango" b/w "Love's Riddle"	—	—	—	—	—	—	—	—	—		Recall the Beginning...A Journey from Eden
1973	"The Joker"^{D} b/w "Something to Believe In"	1	—	8	2	7	1	1	4	1	RIAA: 7× Platinum; BPI: Gold; RMNZ: 4× Platinum	The Joker
1974	"Your Cash Ain't Nothin' But Trash"^{E} b/w "Evil"	51	—	—	40	—	—	—	—	—		The Joker
1974	"Living in the U.S.A." b/w "Kow Kow Calqulator" (from Anthology)	49	—	—	52	—	—	—	—	—		Sailor
1976	"Take The Money and Run"^{E} b/w "Sweet Maree"	11	—	48	8	—	—	—	—	57	RIAA: 2× Platinum; RMNZ: Gold	Fly Like An Eagle
1976	"Rock'n Me"^{E} b/w "Shu Ba Da Du Ma Ma Ma Ma" (from The Joker)	1	—	30	1	28	22	23	—	11	RIAA: 2× Platinum; RMNZ: Gold	Fly Like An Eagle
1976	"Fly Like an Eagle"^{E} b/w "Lovin' Cup" (from The Joker)	2	—	—	2	—	21	—	—	—	US: Platinum; RMNZ: Gold	Fly Like An Eagle
1977	"Serenade"^{F} b/w "Dance, Dance, Dance"	—	—	—	—	—	—	—	—	—		Fly Like An Eagle
1977	"Jet Airliner" b/w "Babes in the Wood"	8	—	23	3	—	11	12	—	—	RMNZ: Gold	Book of Dreams
1977	"Jungle Love" b/w "Wish Upon a Star"	23	—	87	18	—	—	—	—	—		Book of Dreams
1977	"Swingtown" b/w "Winter Time"	17	—	—	13	—	—	—	—	53		Book of Dreams
1981	"Heart Like a Wheel" b/w "True Fine Love" (from Book of Dreams)	24	17	87	17	—	—	—	—	—		Circle of Love
1982	"Circle of Love" b/w "Circle of Love" (Instrumental)	55	—	—	—	—	—	—	—	—		Circle of Love
1982	"Macho City" b/w "Fly Like An Eagle" (from Fly Like an Eagle)	—	—	—	—	—	27	—	—	—		Circle of Love
1982	"Abracadabra" b/w "Give It Up"	1	4	1	1	2	26	8	1	2	RIAA: 2× Platinum; BPI: Silver; MC: Platinum; RMNZ: Gold	Abracadabra
1982	"Cool Magic" b/w "Young Girl's Heart"	57	—	—	—	—	—	—	—	—		Abracadabra
1982	"Keeps Me Wondering Why"^{F} b/w "Get on Home" (from Circle of Love)	—	—	84	—	—	—	—	—	52		Abracadabra
1982	"Give It Up" b/w "Heart Like a Wheel" (from Circle of Love)	60	—	—	—	—	—	—	—	—		Abracadabra
1984	"Shangri-La" b/w "Circle of Love" (from Circle of Love)	57	—	—	84	—	—	—	—	—		Italian X Rays
1984	"Italian X-Rays" b/w "Who Do You Love"	—	—	—	—	—	—	—	—	—		Italian X Rays
1985	"Bongo Bongo" b/w "Get on Home" (from Circle of Love)	84	—	—	—	—	—	—	—	—		Italian X Rays
1986	"I Want to Make the World Turn Around" b/w "Slinky"	97	1	72	—	—	—	—	—	86		Living in the 20th Century
1987	"Nobody But You Baby" b/w "Maelstrom"	—	9	—	—	—	—	—	—	—		Living in the 20th Century
1988	"Ya Ya" b/w "Filthy McNasty"	—	10	—	57	—	—	—	—	—		Born 2 B Blue
1993	"Wide River"; CD single paired with "Stranger Blues"	64	7	—	36	—	—	—	—	—		Wide River
"—" denotes releases that did not chart.

== Video albums ==
Year	Title	Certifications
2006	Fly Like an Eagle: 30th Anniversary	RIAA: Gold
2008	Steve Miller Band: Live from Chicago	RIAA: Gold
2012	Steve Miller Band: Live at Austin City Limits	

== Notes ==
A.Album credited to "The Steve Miller Band".
B.Born 2 B Blue is a Steve Miller solo album.
D.All peak positions for "The Joker", except in the United States, are from the single's 1990 reissue.
E.Credited to Steve Miller on the American single release.
F.A UK only release.
