= Ultimate Hits (Steve Miller Band album) =

Greatest hits album by The Steve Miller Band
- Released: September 15, 2017
- Recorded: 1968–2010
- Genre: Rock / Blues
- Length: 1:11:54 (standard version); 146:04 (deluxe edition)
- Labels: Capitol, Universal

The Steve Miller Band chronology
Live at the Carousel Ballroom, San Francisco, April 1968 (2014)	Ultimate Hits (2017)	Welcome to the Vault (2019)

Professional ratings
Review scores
Source	Rating
AllMusic	3.5/5 stars
All About Jazz	3/4 stars
Louder Sound	4.5/5 stars
Backseat Mafia	6.5/10 stars

Ultimate Hits is a greatest hits album by The Steve Miller Band released in September 2017 by Capitol Records. Compiled by Miller himself, it features tracks that he felt were best representative of his career spanning more than fifty years. The deluxe edition includes the entirety of Greatest Hits 1974-78 with the exception of "Winter Time" which is on the standard edition, and both editions feature some of the band's most popular singles like "The Joker," "Take the Money and Run," "Fly Like an Eagle," "Jet Airliner," "Swingtown," "Jungle Love," and "Abracadabra." Previously unreleased studio tracks and live performances from his 21st Century line-up also appear.

== Standard version track listing ==
All tracks written by Steve Miller, unless otherwise noted.

No.	Title	Writer(s)	Length
1.	"Harmony of the Spheres 2" (from Italian X Rays, 1984)	Byron Allred	0:49
2.	"Steve Miller Age Five Talking To His Godfather Les Paul" (from Steve Miller Band box set, 1994)		0:49
3.	"Take the Money and Run" (from Fly Like an Eagle, 1976)		2:47
4.	"Rock'n Me" (from Fly Like an Eagle)		3:03
5.	"The Stake" (from Book of Dreams, 1977)	David Denny	3:55
6.	"Threshold" (from Book of Dreams)		0:53
7.	"Jet Airliner" (from Book of Dreams)	Paul Pena	3:36
8.	"The Joker" (from The Joker, 1973)	Miller, Eddie Curtis, Ahmet Ertegun	4:26
9.	"Abracadabra" (from Abracadabra, 1982)		5:07
10.	"Jungle Love" (from Book of Dreams)	Lonnie Turner, Greg Douglass	3:07
11.	"Swingtown" (from Book of Dreams)	Miller, Chris McCarty	3:28
12.	"Dance, Dance, Dance" (from Fly Like an Eagle)	Miller, Joseph Cooper, Brenda Cooper	2:18
13.	"Serenade from the Stars" (from Fly Like an Eagle)	Miller, Chris McCarty	3:10
14.	"Space Intro" (from Fly Like an Eagle)		1:13
15.	"Fly Like an Eagle" (from Fly Like an Eagle)		4:42
16.	"Wild Mountain Honey" (from Fly Like an Eagle)	Steve McCarty	4:50
17.	"Living in the U.S.A." (live, previously unreleased)		4:52
18.	"Space Cowboy" (live, previously unreleased)	Miller, Ben Sidran	3:49
19.	"Seasons" (previously unreleased)		3:04
20.	"I Want to Make the World Turn Around" (from Living in the 20th Century, 1986)		4:25
21.	"Winter Time" (from Book of Dreams)		3:14
22.	"The Window" (from Fly Like an Eagle)	Miller, Jason Cooper	4:16

== Deluxe edition track listing ==
All tracks written by Steve Miller, unless otherwise noted.

=== Disc one ===
No.	Title	Writer(s)	Length
1.	"Steve Miller at age five talking to his godfather Les Paul" (from Steve Miller Band box set, 1994)		0:50
2.	"Gangster of Love" (live, previously unreleased)	Johnny "Guitar" Watson	4:55
3.	"The Joker" (from The Joker, 1973)	Steve Miller, Eddie Curtis, Ahmet Ertegun	4:26
4.	"Baby's Callin' Me Home" (previously unreleased)	Boz Scaggs	3:59
5.	"My Dark Hour" (from Brave New World, 1969)		2:39
6.	"Little Girl" (from Your Saving Grace, 1969)		3:22
7.	"Living in the U.S.A." (live, previously unreleased)		4:49
8.	"Space Cowboy" (live, previously unreleased)	Miller, Ben Sidran	3:49
9.	"Seasons" (previously unreleased)		3:04
10.	"Journey from Eden" (from Recall the Beginning...A Journey from Eden, 1972)		3:44
11.	"Shu Ba Da Du Ma Ma Ma Ma" (from The Joker)		5:41
12.	"Going to Mexico" (from Number 5, 1970)	Miller, Scaggs	2:29
13.	"Kow Kow Calculator" (live, previously unreleased)		6:03
14.	"Come On in My Kitchen" (live, from The Joker Live In Concert, 2015)	Robert Johnson	3:14
15.	"Sugar Babe" (live, from The Joker Live In Concert)		4:09
16.	"The Lovin' Cup" (live, from The Joker Live In Concert)		3:07
17.	"Dance, Dance, Dance" (from Fly Like an Eagle, 1976)	Miller, Joseph Cooper, Brenda Cooper	2:18
18.	"Take the Money and Run" (from Fly Like an Eagle)		2:47
19.	"Rock'n Me" (from Fly Like an Eagle)		3:03
20.	"Space Intro" (from Fly Like an Eagle)		1:12
21.	"Fly Like an Eagle" (from Fly Like an Eagle)		4:42

=== Disc two ===
No.	Title	Writer(s)	Length
1.	"Wild Mountain Honey" (from Fly Like an Eagle)	Steve McCarty	4:50
2.	"The Window" (from Fly Like an Eagle)	Miller, Jason Cooper	4:16
3.	"Take the Money and Run" (demo, previously unreleased)		3:42
4.	"In the Midnight Hour" (previously unreleased)	Wilson Pickett	3:15
5.	"Jungle Love" (from Book of Dreams, 1977)	Lonnie Turner, Greg Douglass	3:06
6.	"Threshold" (from Book of Dreams)		1:04
7.	"Jet Airliner" (from Book of Dreams)	Paul Pena	4:22
8.	"The Stake" (from Book of Dreams)	David Denny	3:57
9.	"Swingtown" (from Book of Dreams)	Miller, Chris McCarty	3:27
10.	"Serenade from the Stars" (from Fly Like an Eagle)	Miller, Chris McCarty	3:10
11.	"True Fine Love" (from Book of Dreams)		2:39
12.	"Heart Like a Wheel" (from Circle of Love, 1981)		4:00
13.	"Abracadabra" (from Abracadabra, 1982)		5:11
14.	"I Want to Make the World Turn Around" (from Living in the 20th Century, 1986)		4:23
15.	"Italian X Rays" (from Italian X Rays, 1984)	Miller, Gary Mallaber	4:39
16.	"Don't Cha Know" (previously unreleased)	Jimmie Vaughan	3:16
17.	"Cry Cry Cry" (from Wide River, 1993)		4:18
18.	"Stranger Blues" (from Wide River)	Elmore James, Bobby Robinson	4:28
19.	"Behind the Barn" (from Living in the 20th Century)		3:39

== Charts ==
Chart performance for Ultimate Hits
Chart (2025)	Peak position
Greek Albums (IFPI)	25
