= Young Hearts (album) =

Greatest hits album by Steve Miller Band
- Released: September 16, 2003
- Recorded: 1968–1993
- Genre: Rock
- Length: 78:49
- Label: Capitol

Steve Miller Band chronology
King Biscuit Flour Hour Presents The Steve Miller Band (2002)	Young Hearts (2003)	Fly Like an Eagle (30th Anniversary Edition) (2006)

Young Hearts is a compilation album by the Steve Miller Band released in September 2003 by Capitol Records. It is the first single-disc career-spanning compilation for the band, including material from their earliest days through their latest (at the time) album. The album charted at number 37 on Billboard 200 and it peaked at number 93 in the Netherlands.

== Critical reception ==
Professional ratings
Review scores
Source	Rating
AllMusic	4.5/5 stars

== Track listing ==
1. "Take the Money and Run" – 2:52
2. "Abracadabra" (Single version) – 3:41
3. "Rock'n Me" – 3:08
4. "Swingtown" – 3:39
5. "The Joker" – 4:29
6. "Livin' in the USA" – 3:47
7. "Space Intro" – 1:14
8. "Fly Like an Eagle" – 4:06
9. "Threshold" – 1:06
10. "Jet Airliner" – 4:30
11. "Space Cowboy" – 4:59
12. "Jungle Love" – 3:10
13. "Serenade" – 3:15
14. "Cry, Cry, Cry" – 4:09
15. "Shubada Du Ma Ma" – 5:44
16. "Wide River" – 3:59
17. "Wild Mountain Honey" – 4:54
18. "The Stake" – 3:34
19. "My Dark Hour" – 2:38
20. "Who Do You Love" – 2:50
21. "I Want to Make the World Turn Around" – 4:31
22. "Dance Dance Dance" – 2:21

== Certifications ==
Region	Certification	Certified units/sales
United States (RIAA)	Gold	500,000^{^}
^{^} Shipments figures based on certification alone.
