= Steve Miller Band Live! =

Live album by Steve Miller Band
- Released: April 1983
- Recorded: September 25, 1982
- Venue: Pine Knob Amphitheater (Clarkston, Michigan)
- Genre: Blues rock; pop rock; new wave
- Length: 38:48
- Label: Capitol
- Producer: Steve Miller

Steve Miller Band chronology
Abracadabra (1982)	Steve Miller Band Live! (1983)	Italian X Rays (1984)

Steve Miller Band Live! is a 1983 live album by the Steve Miller Band. It was recorded live at the Pine Knob Amphitheater, Clarkston, Michigan, on September 25, 1982.

== Track listing ==
1. "Gangster of Love" – 2:56
2. "Rock 'N Me" – 4:08
3. "Living in the U.S.A." – 3:26
4. "Fly Like an Eagle" – 3:31
5. "Jungle Love" – 3:44
6. "The Joker" – 2:59
7. "Mercury Blues" – 5:24
8. "Take the Money and Run" – 3:53
9. "Abracadabra" – 3:42
10. "Jet Airliner" – 5:05

== Personnel ==
- Steve Miller – vocals, guitar
- John Massaro – guitar
- Kenny Lee Lewis – guitar
- Norton Buffalo – harmonica
- Byron Allred – keyboards
- Gerald Johnson – bass guitar
- Gary Mallaber – drums, percussion, keyboards
