= The Very Best of the Steve Miller Band =

Greatest hits album by Steve Miller Band
- Released: 1991
- Genre: Rock
- Length: 1:03:54
- Label: Arcade

Steve Miller Band chronology
Living in the U.S.A. (1990)	The Very Best of the Steve Miller Band (1991)	Wide River (1993)

The Very Best of the Steve Miller Band is a 1991 German compilation by the Steve Miller Band.

== Track listing ==
1. "Space Intro" (Steve Miller) – 1:16
2. "Fly Like an Eagle" (Miller) – 4:45
3. "The Joker" (Miller) – 4:25
4. "Abracadabra" (Miller) – 3:39
5. "Give It Up" (Miller) – 3:34
6. "Rock'n Me" (Miller) – 3:05
7. "Macho City" (Miller) – 3:21
8. "Serenade from the Stars" (Miller, Chris McCarthy) – 3:11
9. "Threshold" (Miller, Byron Allred) – 1:06
10. "Jet Airliner" (Paul Pena) – 3:34
11. "Keeps Me Wondering Why" (Gary Mallaber, Kenny Lewis) – 3:39
12. "Jungle Love" (Lonnie Turner, Greg Douglass) – 3:08
13. "Take the Money and Run" (Miller) – 2:49
14. "True Fine Love" (Miller) – 2:39
15. "Wild Mountain Honey" (Steve McCarthy) – 4:51
16. "Winter Time" (Miller) – 3:11
17. "The Stake" (David Denny) – 3:56
18. "Swingtown" (Miller, Chris McCarthy) – 3:28
19. "The Window" (Miller, Jason Cooper) – 4:17

== Personnel ==
- Steve Miller – vocals, guitars, keyboards, electronics
- Byron Allred – synthesizers
- Greg Douglass – guitar
- Gerald Johnson – bass
- Kenny Lewis – guitars and bass
- Gary Mallaber – drums
- Lonnie Turner – bass
- Jacheem Young – B-3 organ

== Certifications ==
Region	Certification	Certified units/sales
Australia (ARIA)	Gold	35,000^{^}
^{^} Shipments figures based on certification alone.
