= Greatest Hits 1974–78 =

- Cover art by Kelley and Mouse

Greatest hits album by the Steve Miller Band
- Released: November 1978
- Recorded: 1973–1977
- Genre: Rock
- Length: 43:21
- Label: Capitol (US) Mercury (Europe)
- Producer: Steve Miller

The Steve Miller Band chronology
Book of Dreams (1977)	Greatest Hits 1974–78 (1978)	Circle of Love (1981)

Professional ratings
Review scores
Source	Rating
AllMusic	4.5/5 stars
Christgau's Record Guide	A−
Encyclopedia of Popular Music	4/5 stars

Greatest Hits 1974–78 is a compilation album by the Steve Miller Band released in November 1978, presenting the band's hits from 1973–1978. (Note: Not every song on the album was released as a single, but among those that were, "The Joker" began its 20-week chart run on the Billboard Hot 100 in October 1973, and "Swingtown" ended its run on the same chart in January 1978.)

== Content ==
The album includes the title track from 1973's The Joker plus 13 tracks taken from Fly Like an Eagle (1976) and Book of Dreams (1977). The compilation doesn't include tracks from earlier albums, as the 1972 Anthology compilation covers the pre-1973 material.

The shorter 7-inch single versions of "Jet Airliner", "Swingtown", "The Joker", and "Fly Like an Eagle" are used on this compilation.

== Track listing ==
All tracks are written by Steve Miller, except where noted.

Side A
No.	Title	Writer(s)	Original Release	Length
1.	"Swingtown"	Steve Miller; Chris McCarty	1977 ~ Book of Dreams	3:27
2.	"Jungle Love"	Lonnie Turner; Greg Douglass	1977 ~ Book of Dreams	3:02
3.	"Take the Money and Run"		1976 ~ Fly Like An Eagle	2:48
4.	"Rock'n Me"		1976 ~ Fly Like An Eagle	3:05
5.	"Serenade"	Miller; Chris McCarty	1976 ~ Fly Like An Eagle	3:10
6.	"True Fine Love"		1977 ~ Book of Dreams	2:38
7.	"The Stake"	David Denny	1977 ~ Book of Dreams	3:55

Side B
No.	Title	Writer(s)	Original Release	Length
8.	"The Joker"	Steve Miller; Eddie Curtis; Ahmet Ertegun	1973 ~ The Joker	3:36
9.	"Fly Like an Eagle"		1976 ~ Fly Like An Eagle	3:00
10.	"Threshold"	Steve Miller; Byron Allred	1977 ~ Book of Dreams	1:04
11.	"Jet Airliner"	Paul Pena	1977 ~ Book of Dreams	3:20
12.	"Dance, Dance, Dance"	Steve Miller; Joseph Cooper; Brenda Cooper	1976 ~ Fly Like An Eagle	2:16
13.	"Winter Time"		1977 ~ Book of Dreams	3:09
14.	"Wild Mountain Honey"	Steve McCarty	1976 ~ Fly Like An Eagle	4:50

A later U.S. reissue cassette version of the album manufactured by Capitol Records omits four of the above tracks: "Serenade" and "The Stake" on side A, and "Threshold" and "Dance, Dance, Dance" from Side B; the order of the tracks remains the same.

All selections published by Sailor Music, except "The Joker" by Sailor Music/Unichappel Music, Inc. and "Jet Airliner" by Sailor Music/No Thought Music.

== Personnel ==
- Steve Miller – synthesizer, guitar, keyboards, vocals, producer, compilation producer
- David Denny – guitar, rhythm guitar
- Greg Douglass – guitar, slide guitar
- John McFee – Dobro
- Bob Glaub – bass guitar
- Gerald Johnson – bass guitar
- Lonnie Turner – bass guitar
- Byron Allred – synthesizer, piano, keyboards
- Joachim Jymm Young – Hammond organ
- Dickie Thompson – organ, clavinet
- Norton Buffalo – harmonica on tracks 7 and 13
- John King – drums
- Gary Mallaber – percussion, drums

Production

- Roberta Ballard – production manager
- Mike Fusaro – engineer
- Jim Gaines – engineer, mixing
- Gene Hicks – assistant engineer, mixing assistant
- Steve Hoffman – remastering
- Win Kutz – mixing assistant
- Marcia McGovern – pre-production
- John Palladino – executive producer
- Jay Ranellucci – engineer, mixing

Artwork and design

- Kelley and Mouse – Cover illustration & design
- Sam Shepard – cover lettering
- David Stahl – photography
- John Van Hamersveld – design

== Charts ==
=== Weekly charts ===
Chart (1978–2019)	Peak position
Canada Top Albums/CDs (RPM)	18
US Billboard 200	18
US Top Rock Albums (Billboard)	11

=== Year-end charts ===
Chart (2019)	Position
US Top Rock Albums (Billboard)	54
Chart (2020)	Position
US Top Rock Albums (Billboard)	42
Chart (2021)	Position
US Top Rock Albums (Billboard)	49

== Certifications and sales ==
Region	Certification	Certified units/sales
Canada (Music Canada)	Diamond	1,000,000^{^}
United States (RIAA)	16× Platinum	16,000,000^{‡}
^{^} Shipments figures based on certification alone.^{‡} Sales+streaming figures based on certification alone.

== See also ==
- List of best-selling albums in the United States
