= Steve Miller (musician) =

American guitarist and singer-songwriter (born 1943)

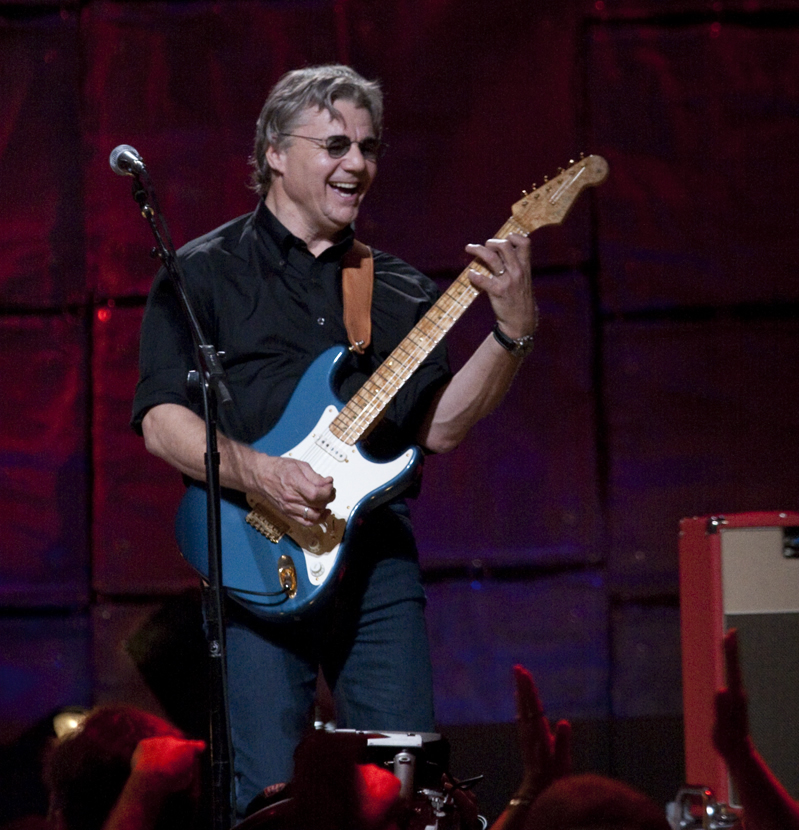
- Miller in 2010

Background information
- Born: Steven Haworth Miller; October 5, 1943 (age 83); Milwaukee, Wisconsin, U.S.
- Genres: Rock; pop; blues; psychedelia; new wave
- Occupations: Musician; singer-songwriter
- Instruments: Vocals; guitar; harmonica; keyboards
- Years active: 1962–present
- Member of: Steve Miller Band
- Website: stevemillerband.com

Steven Haworth Miller (born October 5, 1943) is an American musician. He is the frontman, principal songwriter, lead singer, lead guitarist and only continuous member of the Steve Miller Band, which he founded in 1966. He began his career in blues and blues rock and evolved to a more pop-oriented arena rock sound during the mid-1970s through the early 1980s, releasing popular singles and albums. Miller was inducted into the Rock and Roll Hall of Fame in 2016.

== Early years ==
Born in Milwaukee, Miller received his first exposure to music from his mother Bertha, whom he described as a remarkable jazz-influenced singer, and his physician father George ("Sonny") who, in addition to his profession as a pathologist, was a jazz enthusiast and an accomplished amateur recording engineer.

Guitar virtuoso Les Paul and his musical partner Mary Ford were regular visitors at the Miller house. The Millers were the best man and matron of honor at the December 1949 Paul/Ford wedding, and Paul became Steve's godfather. Les Paul heard six-year-old Steve on a wire recording made by his father. The boy was "banging away" on a guitar given to him by his uncle, K. Dale Atterbury. Paul encouraged Miller to continue with his interest in the guitar... and "perhaps he will be something one day."

In 1950, the family relocated to Dallas. Many distinguished musicians came to their house to record, and Miller absorbed much from "greats" such as T-Bone Walker, Charles Mingus, and Tal Farlow. Walker taught Miller how to play his guitar behind his back and with his teeth.

In 1955, Miller began attending St. Mark's School in Dallas, a non-denominational boys' preparatory day school where he formed his first band, The Marksmen. He taught his older brother Buddy how to play electric bass and instructed his classmate Boz Scaggs on guitar chords so Scaggs could join the band. After leaving St. Mark's—"I got kicked out", Miller recalled later—he attended a school in the Lakewood area of Dallas, Woodrow Wilson High School, where he graduated in 1961.

In 1961, Miller returned to Wisconsin, and entered the University of Wisconsin–Madison, where he formed The Ardells. Scaggs joined the Ardells the next year, and Ben Sidran became the band's keyboardist in the following year. After attending the University of Copenhagen in Denmark for a semester in his senior year to study comparative literature, Miller dropped out six credit hours shy of a literature degree, opting to pursue a music career with his mother's encouragement and his father's misgivings:

[Interviewer:] When you look back over the span of your career, what are the lasting moments, the sweetest highs?
[Miller:] I would have to say my father's relationship with Les Paul and T-Bone Walker when I was young. Growing up in Dallas, being part of that phenomenal music scene. I found a way to do what I really wanted to do, which is so important for a kid. Near the end of college, my parents said, 'Steve, what are you going to do?' I said, 'I want to go to Chicago and play the blues.' My father looked at me like I was insane. But my mom said, 'You should do it now.' So I went to Chicago. And that was a special time. I played with Muddy Waters and Howlin' Wolf. I got to work with adults and realized music was what I wanted to do, what I loved.

Upon his return to the United States, Miller moved to Chicago where he immersed himself in the city's blues scene. During his time there, he worked with harmonica player Paul Butterfield and jammed with blues greats Muddy Waters, Howlin' Wolf, and Buddy Guy, all of whom encouraged the young guitarist to pursue music. In 1965, Miller and keyboardist Barry Goldberg formed the Goldberg-Miller Blues Band and began playing on the Chicago club scene. They signed with Epic Records and released a single, "The Mother Song". They began a residency at a New York City blues club.

When Miller returned from New York, he was disappointed by the Chicago blues scene, so he moved to Texas in hopes of finishing his education at the University of Texas at Austin. He was disenchanted with academic politics at the university and took a Volkswagen Bus his father had given him and headed to San Francisco. After arriving he used his last $5 to see the Butterfield Blues Band and Jefferson Airplane at the Fillmore Auditorium. He fell in love with the vibrant San Francisco music scene and decided to stay.

== Steve Miller Band ==
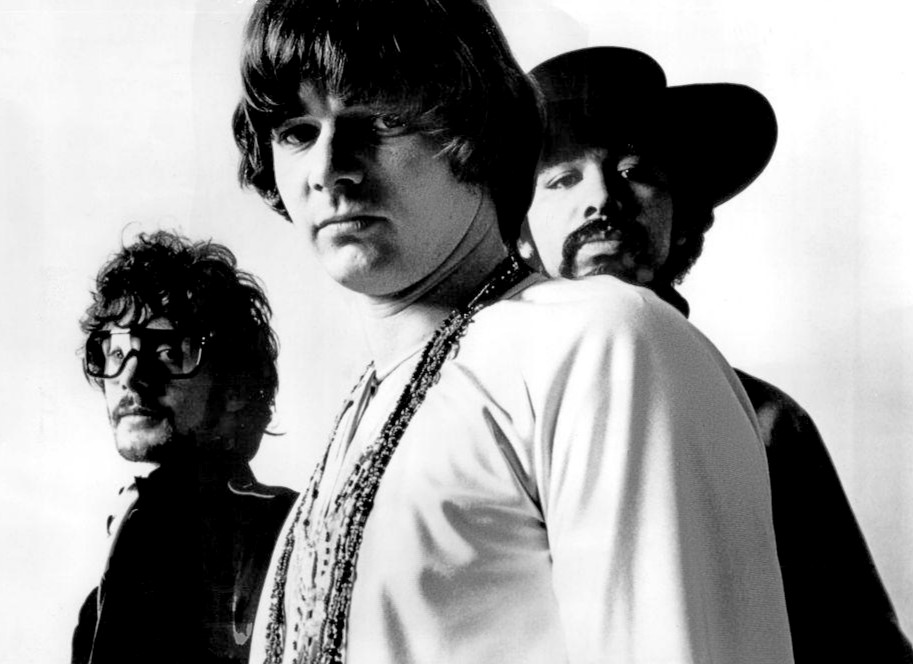
Miller (center) with the Steve Miller Band, 1969

In 1966, he formed the Steve Miller Band (at first called The Steve Miller Blues Band), with Miller doing the vocals. They backed Chuck Berry on his Live at Fillmore Auditorium album released that year. In 1968, they released an album, Children of the Future, the first in a series of discs rooted solidly in the psychedelic blues style that then dominated the San Francisco scene. Writing in Crawdaddy!, Peter Knobler called the album "a triple moment of experience, knowledge, inspiration". Boz Scaggs rejoined Miller for this album and the next one, before starting his solo career.

The group followed the release of their second album, Sailor, with Brave New World, Your Saving Grace, and Number 5. These albums performed respectably on the U.S. Billboard 200 chart but failed to yield a major hit single. The highest single was "Livin' in the USA" from Sailor. Songs from this period are featured in a portion of the double album compilation Anthology, which includes a guest appearance on bass guitar, drums, and backing vocals by Paul McCartney (as Paul Ramon) on "Celebration Song" and "My Dark Hour".

Miller established his persona of the "Gangster of Love" (from Sailor) and the "Space Cowboy" (from Brave New World), which were reused in later works. In 1972, Miller recorded the album Recall the Beginning...A Journey from Eden, in which a third persona, "Maurice", was introduced in the tune "Enter Maurice".

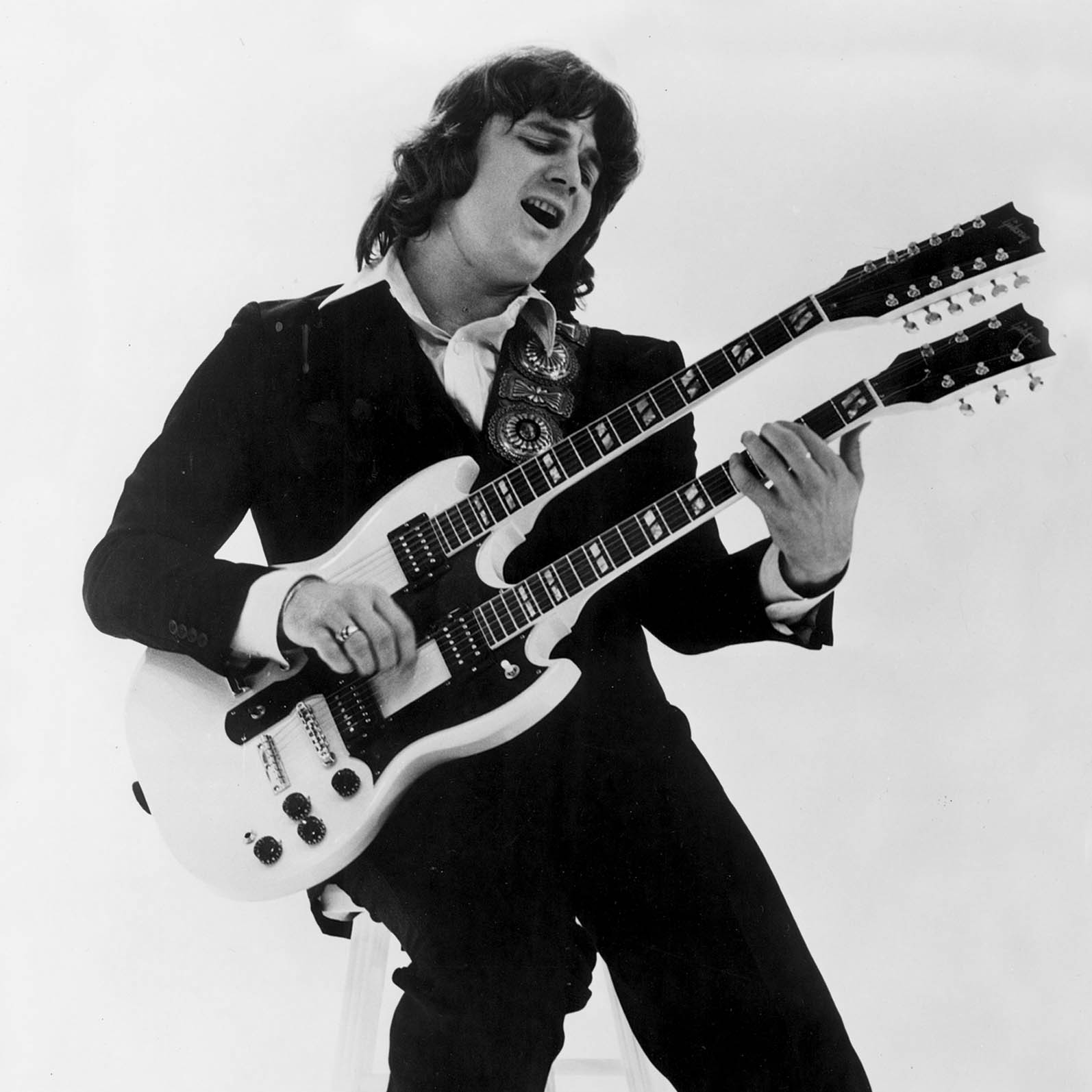
Miller in 1977

In 1973, The Joker marked the start of the second phase of Miller's career: this work was less blues oriented and simpler in composition. The album received significant radio airplay, which helped the title track reach number one on the Billboard Hot 100 chart. The single hit No 1 on the UK Singles Chart in September 1990 after it was used for a television commercial.

Miller followed up with Fly Like an Eagle in 1976, and Book of Dreams in 1977. (The songs for both had been recorded at the same time, and released over two single albums rather than one double-album.) This pair of albums represented the peak of Miller's commercial career, both reaching the top echelons of the album charts and spawning a lengthy series of hit singles, including "Take the Money and Run", "Rock'n Me", "Fly Like an Eagle", "Jet Airliner", and "Jungle Love". The Steve Miller Band co-headlined a major stadium tour with the Eagles in 1978.

In 1978, Greatest Hits 1974–78 was released. The band's ongoing popularity fueled successful concert tours throughout the 1980s and 1990s, often with large numbers of younger people present at the concerts. Miller would often headline shows with other classic rock acts, and played a variety of his music, including a selection of his blues work dating from the late 1960s.

== 1980s and later ==
On the heels of this massive success, Miller took a long hiatus from recording and touring, emerging in 1981 with Circle of Love. Sales were disappointing, and in 1982 he returned to the pop formula with another hit album, Abracadabra. This was Miller's last great commercial success; a series of collections, live albums and attempts to find a new style appeared in 1984 (Italian X-Rays), 1986 (Living in the 20th Century), and 1988 (Born 2B Blue). He released Wide River in 1993, which was his only studio release of new material between 1988 and 2010.

Miller released Bingo! on June 15, 2010. The album of blues covers, issued through his own Space Cowboy label in partnership with Roadrunner Records/ Loud & Proud Records, was his first studio album release since 1993. Let Your Hair Down, a companion release to Bingo!, was released 10 months later (on April 18, 2011).

For the 2010–11 academic year, Miller was an Artist in Residence at the USC Thornton School of Music, where he taught students in the Popular Music and Music Industry programs.

At a guitar auction in 2011, Miller said that he owned 450 guitars.

In 2016, Miller was inducted into the Rock and Roll Hall of Fame. The ceremony caused controversy because of Miller's disparaging remarks about the experience being "unpleasant", saying that the Hall of Fame was misogynistic and ignoring the "need to respect the artists they say they're honoring, which they don't". He thanked the Hall of Fame for all of its "hard work on behalf of all musicians", but added, "I encourage you to keep expanding your vision, to be more inclusive of women and more transparent … and, most important, to do much more to provide music in our schools." Miller himself said part of his angry behavior that evening was because the Hall vetoed his proposal to be inducted by Elton John, as he "knows me and probably knows my music better than most people", and its controlling aspects such as the licensing contracts. The Black Keys, who were asked to induct Miller and accepted, having been long-time fans, later stated that they regretted the experience. Dan Auerbach said that for him and Patrick Carney, the unpleasant experience was being around Miller, as he had no idea who the band was and did not care. Auerbach and Carney left the ceremony as soon as they finished their speech.

In 2025, the Steve Miller Band was featured in "It's Time" on Nas' and DJ Premier's album Light-Years.

== Influence ==
In May 2024, Eminem released the single "Houdini", which prominently samples Steve Miller Band's 1982 hit "Abracadabra".

== Personal life ==
Miller has been married four times. As of 2019 his wife was Janice Ginsberg Miller. From 1976 to 1986, Miller owned the Lippincott-Wagner House and a 420-acre (170 ha) ranch in the hamlet of Williams, Oregon. In 2015, it was placed on the National Register of Historic Places.

As of 2009, Miller is a member of the Bohemian Club.

== Discography ==
=== Solo ===
- Born 2B Blue (September 1988)

=== with Steve Miller Band ===
- Children of the Future (April 1968)
- Sailor (October 1968 - reissued as Living In The U.S.A. in 1973)
- Brave New World (June 1969)
- Your Saving Grace (November 1969)
- Number 5 (July 1970)
- Rock Love (October 1971)
- Recall the Beginning...A Journey from Eden (March 1972)
- Anthology (October 1972) [Compilation]
- The Joker (October 1973)
- Fly Like an Eagle (May 1976)
- Book of Dreams (May 1977)
- Greatest Hits (1974-1978) (November 1978) [Compilation]
- Circle of Love (October 1981)
- Abracadabra (June 1982)
- Steve Miller Band Live! (April 1983)
- Italian X-Rays (November 1984)
- Living in the 20th Century (November 1986)
- The Very Best of the Steve Miller Band (1991) [Compilation]
- Wide River (July 1993)
- Young Hearts (2003) [Compilation]
- Bingo! (2010)
- Let Your Hair Down (2011)

== See also ==
- Notable alumni of St. Mark's School of Texas
- Pompatus
