= Kids Rock Free =

American non-profit organization

Kids Rock Free is an American non-profit organization whose aim is to help children aged 7 to 17 receive a music education. The organization was founded by the Fender Musical Instruments Corporation in 1998, and is housed in the Fender Museum of Music & Art in Corona, California. Lessons are free or at low cost in an area where music education in the public schools was a rarity. Initially aimed at giving guitar and piano lessons and focused on rock and roll, it soon began a technical program for producing music, and then programs for theater, dance, and world music. In 2000, it was teaching 400 students a week, and more than 12,000 students have gone through the program since 1998.

Longtime supporters of the organization include Steve Miller. To raise money for the organization, the Fender Center for the Performing Arts regularly stages concerts and Fender sponsors golf tournaments; in 2004, the organization received $100,000 from the federal government.
