= Ultimate Hits =

Ultimate Hits may refer to:

== Albums ==
- Ultimate Hits (Lee Kernaghan album), 2011
- Ultimate Hits (Steve Miller Band album), 2017
- Ultimate Hits (Little River Band album), 2022
- The Ultimate Hits (Garth Brooks album), 2007
- The Ultimate Hits Collection (Juice Newton album), 2011
- The Ultimate Hits Collection (Johnny Mathis album), 1998
- 42 Ultimate Hits, compilation album by Kenny Rogers, 2004
- Ultimate Hits: Rock and Roll Never Forgets, compilation album by Bob Seger
- Double Dose: Ultimate Hits, Poison, 2011
- I Told You So: The Ultimate Hits of Randy Travis, compilation album by Randy Travis, 2009

== Games ==
- Ultimate Hits (Square Enix), Square Enix budget ranges
