= Rock Love =

Studio album / live album by Steve Miller Band
- Released: September 1971
- Genre: Rock
- Length: 38:11
- Label: Capitol
- Producer: Steve Miller

Steve Miller Band chronology
Number 5 (1970)	Rock Love (1971)	Recall the Beginning...A Journey from Eden (1972)

Professional ratings
Review scores
Source	Rating
AllMusic	1/5 stars
Christgau's Record Guide	C−
The Encyclopedia of Popular Music	2/5 stars

Rock Love is the sixth album by American rock band Steve Miller Band, consisting of a mix of material recorded live and in the studio.

The album was released in September 1971, and compiled by Capitol Records. All of Miller's previous backing band had left following the recording of the previous album, save bassist Bobby Winkelman. They were replaced by members of Winkelman's previous group, Frumious Bandersnatch, for this record. The new musicians were Ross Valory on bass, and Jack King on drums. Winkelman moved to rhythm guitar during all three live recordings on the album's first side, but is not credited on the album cover. Likewise, David Denny, who would rejoin the band in 1976, is on lead guitar on the first two - again, not credited.

The album consists of three blues-rock tracks recorded live, including lengthy jam-style "Love Shock" which lasts nearly 12 minutes and includes an extensive drum solo, and four studio tracks. The first song opens with the words "I'm going to play you some blues 'cos I know you like that"; some critics dismissed the album as "generic white-boy blueisms". Unlike Miller's previous five albums, it was a commercial failure.

== Track listing ==
All tracks are written by Steve Miller.

Side one (live)
No.	Title	Length
1.	"The Gangster Is Back"	2:28
2.	"Blues With Out Blame"	5:41
3.	"Love Shock"	11:43

Side two (studio)
No.	Title	Length
1.	"Let Me Serve You"	2:26
2.	"Rock Love"	2:28
3.	"Harbor Lights"	4:06
4.	"Deliverance"	9:19
Total length:		38:11

== Personnel ==
- Steve Miller – lead guitar, vocals
- Ross Valory – bass guitar
- Jack King – drums
- Bobby Winkelman – rhythm guitar (1–3, not credited)
- David Denny - lead guitar (1–2, not credited)
- Tracks 1–2 were recorded live in Dania, Florida.
- Track 3 was recorded live in Pasadena, California.

== Charts ==
Album - Billboard (United States)

Year	Chart	Position
1971	The Billboard 200	82
