= David Denny (musician) =

American rock guitar player (born 1948)

David Denny (born February 5, 1948, Berkeley, California) is an American rock guitar player and founding member of Frumious Bandersnatch, a seminal psychedelic rock band from 1960s San Francisco. Denny was a member of the Steve Miller Band, playing on 1971's Rock Love (uncredited), 1977's Book of Dreams, Greatest Hits 1974–1978 (released in 1978, it sold more than 16 million copies), and 1993's Wide River. Denny wrote the hit song "The Stake" (Book of Dreams, Greatest Hits 1974–1978) and "Circle of Fire" (Wide River).

While running a Mission District studio during the late 1980s, Denny contributed his guitar and vocal talents as a founding member of The Bombay Crawlers and played several Bay Area gigs with the rock ensemble. He later released two albums with his Diesel Harmonics band, Diesel Harmonics (1991) and Louisiana Melody (1997). Denny and ex-wife Kathy Peck (executive director and co-founder of H.E.A.R., former bass player for The Contractions) are artists, songwriters, film score composers, music publishers and owners of Monima Music. Denny recently released two full-length solo albums, Take a Deep Breath (2022) and Agree to Disagree (2023) with co-producer Michael Hurwitz.

== Discography ==
=== With Frumious Bandersnatch ===
- 1968 – Frumious Bandersnatch EP; self-produced
- 1995 – The Berkeley EP's (compilation, 3 songs featured); Big Beat UK
- 1996 – A Young Man's Song; Big Beat UK
- 2003 – Golden Songs of Libra, Get Back
- 2007 – Love Is the Song We Sing: San Francisco Nuggets 1965-1970 (compilation, feat. "Hearts to Cry"); Rhino Records

=== With the Steve Miller Band ===
- 1971 – Rock Love; Capitol Records (uncredited)
- 1977 – Book of Dreams; Capitol Records
- 1978 – Greatest Hits 1974-1978; Capitol Records
- 1993 – Wide River; Polydor Records

=== Six Degrees of Freedom ===
- 1991 – Diesel Harmonics; Diesel Harmonics
- 1997 – Louisiana Melody; Diesel Harmonics

=== Monima Music ===
- 2000 – Live at Hyde Street; David Denny & Carlos Reyes
- 2014 – The Winds of Lyon; The Winds of Lyon (David Denny, Kathy Peck)
- 2014 – Passing By; The Winds of Lyon (David Denny, Kathy Peck)
- 2014 – Need A Lift; The Winds of Lyon (David Denny, Kathy Peck)
- 2022 – Take a Deep Breath; David Denny
- 2023 – Agree to Disagree; David Denny
