= Book of Dreams =

Studio album by Steve Miller Band
- Released: May 10, 1977
- Recorded: 1975–76
- Studios: CBS (San Francisco, California)
- Genres: Blues rock; progressive rock; pop rock
- Length: 38:02
- Label: Capitol
- Producer: Steve Miller

Steve Miller Band chronology
Fly Like an Eagle (1976)	Book of Dreams (1977)	Greatest Hits 1974–78 (1978)

Singles from Book of Dreams
- 1. "Jet Airliner" Released: April 1977; 2. "Jungle Love" Released: July 1977; 3. "Swingtown" Released: October 1977

Book of Dreams is the tenth studio album by Steve Miller Band. The album was released in May 1977 on Capitol Records in the United States, Canada and Japan and by Mercury Records in Europe. Three singles were released from the album in 1977 with the first single, "Jet Airliner", being the most successful.

The album peaked in the top 10 of the trade charts in four countries, including Canada where the album topped RPM magazine's 100 Albums chart. The album has gone on to become one of the group's most successful studio outings.

== Recording and production ==
The songs on Book of Dreams were recorded at CBS Studios in San Francisco, California; the basic tracks were recorded at the same time as the basic tracks for the Steve Miller Band's 1976 album Fly Like an Eagle. The sessions were produced by the group's leader, Steve Miller, who had been producing the group's albums since Number 5 in 1970. John Palladino was the album's executive producer and the recording engineer was Mike Fusaro. The recordings were later mixed by Jim Gains with assistance from Win Kutz and were mastered by Ken Perry.

== Artwork ==
The winged horse art was created by Alton Kelley and Stanley Mouse, who were credited as "Kelly and Mouse". The art director for the album was Roy Kohara. The cover illustration was also used on the record label on the vinyl version of the album.

== Reception ==
Professional ratings
Review scores
Source	Rating
Christgau's Record Guide	B−
The Encyclopedia of Popular Music	3/5 stars
The Rolling Stone Album Guide	4/5 stars

The Bay State Banner wrote that the album "is, for the most part, firmly within the California soft-rock mold exemplified by the Eagles."

AllMusic gave the album a rating of 4/5 stars, calling it "a highlight of the '70s classic rock era and one of Miller's finest releases." The review also comments that it is an unnecessary album for the casual fan to consider, as the 1978 compilation album Greatest Hits 1974–78 contains seven highlight tracks from Book of Dreams.

== Track listing ==
All tracks are written by Steve Miller, except where noted.

Side one
No.	Title	Writer(s)	Length
1.	"Threshold" (Instrumental)	Steve Miller; Byron Allred	1:05
2.	"Jet Airliner"	Paul Pena	4:25
3.	"Winter Time"		3:10
4.	"Swingtown"	Miller; Chris McCarty	3:54
5.	"True Fine Love"		2:37
6.	"Wish Upon a Star"		3:39

Side two
No.	Title	Writer(s)	Length
7.	"Jungle Love"	Lonnie Turner; Greg Douglass	3:10
8.	"Electro Lux Imbroglio" (Instrumental)		0:55
9.	"Sacrifice"	Curley Cooke; Les Dudek	5:17
10.	"The Stake"	David Denny	3:57
11.	"My Own Space"	Jason Cooper; Bobby Winkelman	3:00
12.	"Babes in the Wood" (Instrumental)		2:40
Total length:			38:02

== Personnel ==
- Steve Miller – vocals, guitar, synthesizer, sitar, producer
- David Denny – guitar
- Greg Douglass – guitar, slide guitar
- Byron Allred – piano, synthesizer
- Lonnie Turner – bass guitar
- Gary Mallaber – drums, percussion

Additional personnel

- Norton Buffalo – harmonica on "Winter Time" and "The Stake"
- Les Dudek – lead guitar on "Sacrifice"
- Kenny Johnson – drums on "Sacrifice"
- Joachim Young – piano on "Sacrifice"
- Charles Calmese – bass guitar on "Sacrifice"
- Curley Cooke – acoustic guitar on "Sacrifice"
- Bob Glaub – bass guitar on "Winter Time"

Technical

- John Palladino – executive producer
- Mike Fusaro – recording engineer
- Jim Gains – mixing
- Win Kutz – assistant mixer
- Ken Perry – mastering
- Roy Kohara – art direction
- Kelly – illustration
- Mouse – illustration

== Charts ==
=== Weekly charts ===
Chart (1977)	Peak position
Australian Albums (Kent Music Report)	6
Canada Top Albums/CDs (RPM)	1
Dutch Albums (Album Top 100)	4
German Albums (Offizielle Top 100)	13
New Zealand Albums (RMNZ)	5
Swedish Albums (Sverigetopplistan)	11
UK Albums (Official Charts)	12
US Billboard 200	2

=== Year-end charts ===
Chart (1977)	Position
Australian Albums (Kent Music Report)	22
Canada Top Albums/CDs (RPM)	10
Dutch Albums (Album Top 100)	21
New Zealand Albums (RMNZ)	30
US Billboard 200	44

== Certifications and sales ==
Region	Certification	Certified units/sales
United Kingdom (BPI)	Silver	60,000^{^}
United States (RIAA)	3× Platinum	3,000,000^{^}
^{^} Shipments figures based on certification alone.
