= Abracadabra (Steve Miller Band song) =

1982 single by Steve Miller Band

Single by Steve Miller Band

from the album Abracadabra
- B-side: "Give It Up" (US/Canada) "Baby Wanna Dance" (US/Canada, alternate B-side) "Never Say No" (international)
- Released: May 4, 1982
- Recorded: 1981
- Genre: Pop rock; electronic rock; new wave
- Length: 5:08 (album version); 3:34 (single/video version)
- Label: Capitol (US/Canada); Mercury (international)
- Songwriter: Steve Miller
- Producers: Steve Miller; Gary Mallaber

Steve Miller Band singles chronology
| "Heart Like a Wheel" (1981) | "Abracadabra" (1982) | "Keeps Me Wondering Why" (1982) |

Music video
- "Abracadabra" on YouTube

"Abracadabra" is a song by American rock group the Steve Miller Band, written by Steve Miller. The song was released as the first single from the 1982 album of the same name that year. In the U.S., it spent two non-consecutive weeks at No. 1 on the Billboard Hot 100, the biggest hit of Steve Miller's career to date, as well as their last US top 40 hit.

The song was interpolated in the Eminem song "Houdini", which debuted at No. 2 on the Billboard Hot 100.

== Origins ==
The song is said to have been inspired by the American singer Diana Ross, whom Miller had met when they each performed on the same episode of the pop music television show Hullabaloo in the 1960s. The lyrics "Round and round and round it goes, where it stops nobody knows" are a reference to the spinning wheel segment from The Original Amateur Hour.

Speaking on The Howard Stern Show in June 2016, Miller said at first his record company Capitol Records did not see the potential hit it would become. "Capitol didn't believe in it and didn't want to release it. I had a different deal with Phonogram in Europe. When it came out in Europe, I cancelled my American tour because it was No. 1 everywhere in the world, except the States." After seeing its success overseas, Capitol released it in the U.S. and it also climbed to No. 1.

Upon release, Billboard said the song "mixes sly lyric, soulful vocal, and Miller's guitar wizardry."

== Commercial performance ==
This song became a worldwide hit, charting in ten countries and topping the charts in six. In the U.S., the million selling 45 was No. 1 on the Billboard Hot 100 twice, in two non-consecutive weeks, becoming the band's third number one hit in the U.S. (along with "The Joker" and "Rock'n Me"). It was knocked off the top by Chicago's "Hard to Say I'm Sorry", only to return to No. 1 two weeks later. A similar occurrence happened in 1976, when "Rock'n Me" knocked Chicago's "If You Leave Me Now" out of the No. 1 spot. Surprisingly, 'Abracadabra' crossed over to the Billboard Soul chart and its accompanying music video aired on BET as well as MTV.

The song also showed substantial longevity, spending fourteen weeks in the top ten of the Hot 100 chart. It was the No. 9 song on the Billboard Year-End Hot 100 singles of 1982. "Abracadabra" is listed at No. 90 on Billboard's Hot 100 60th Anniversary chart.

== Alternate versions ==
The UK single version has never yet appeared on CD. It is 3:33 and is an exclusive edit where the chorus is edited back in at 3:06 and repeats to fade. The non-UK single version of the song appears on several Steve Miller Band compilation albums such as Young Hearts as well as on the Time-Life compilation Sounds of the Eighties: 1980–1982 and on a CD of songs hand-picked by Guy Fieri titled Diners, Drive-Ins and Dives: Road Songs That Rock. Capitol issued an alternative version on a promotional 12" single (Capitol Records #SPRO 9797) for radio airplay; it featured a slightly slower tempo, removal of the second verse and first chorus, and a slightly earlier fade than the LP version. A live version of the song was released on Steve Miller Band Live! in 1983.

== Music video ==
The music video features magicians in a white room performing tricks and other illusions with a female assistant. Since Miller himself was touring Europe at the time and unavailable for the shoot, he appears in the video only in a series of photos. He is seen wearing sunglasses or having his eyes covered with a black bar juxtaposed next to images of a beautiful enchantress, "The Abracadabra Girl", Suzanne (Isabelle) Trimble. Her face, physique and actions form the focal point of the video, dramatising the lyrics. She appears in different guises and attitudes; stage magician, juggler of scarves, playful sorceress with white mouse on her shoulder, seductress in a top hat and spandex. At times she is seen reclining, tossing her hair, making fireworks burst from the hat with tap of her wand amid more stills of Steve Miller.

Two young male magician/jugglers are also featured in the video, sometimes shirtless. They perform tricks and make the young witch disappear. She then turns into an older female sorceress, performed by another actress, who gestures dramatically then dances a tango in hot pants. The video begins and ends with the Abracadabra Girl placing a ball on a spinning umbrella, suggestive of the line "round and round and round it goes, where it stops nobody knows".

Various special effects are employed in the video, such as collage, extreme colours and computer created magical effects. Somewhat primitive now, at that time, the early days of MTV and music videos, such effects were fresh and innovative. The video has since become iconic as has the mysterious girl, whose image is interwoven with the song. Peter Conn served as the video's director.

== Track listings ==
=== 7" 45 RPM ===
Side one

1. "Abracadabra" (single version; note: UK 7" version is an exclusive edit – see above for details)

Side two

1. "Baby Wanna Dance" (North American release)
1. "Never Say No" (European release)

=== 12" maxi ===
==== North American release ====
Side one

1. "Abracadabra" (album version)

Side two

1. "Macho City" (album version)

==== European release ====
Side one

1. "Abracadabra" (album version)

Side two

1. "Never Say No" (album version)

== Charts ==
=== Weekly charts ===
Weekly chart performance for "Abracadabra"
| Chart (1982) | Peak position |
|---|---|
| Argentina | 7 |
| Australia (Kent Music Report) | 1 |
| Austria (Ö3 Austria Top 40) | 1 |
| Belgium (BRT Top 30) | 1 |
| Canada (RPM) Top Singles | 1 |
| Canada RPM Adult Contemporary | 1 |
| Denmark (Hitlisten) | 2 |
| Finland (Suomen virallinen lista) | 4 |
| France (IFOP) | 37 |
| Germany (Official German Charts) | 2 |
| Iceland (Dagblaðið Vísir) | 2 |
| Ireland (IRMA) | 2 |
| Israel (IBA) | 1 |
| Italy (Musica e dischi) | 26 |
| Netherlands (Single Top 100) | 26 |
| New Zealand (Recorded Music NZ) | 8 |
| Norway (VG-lista) | 4 |
| Portugal (Associação Fonográfica Portuguesa) | 1 |
| South Africa (Springbok) | 2 |
| Spain (AFYVE) | 1 |
| Sweden (Sverigetopplistan) | 1 |
| Switzerland (Schweizer Hitparade) | 1 |
| UK Singles (Official Charts) | 2 |
| US Billboard Hot 100 | 1 |
| US Billboard Adult Contemporary | 28 |
| US Dance Club Songs (Billboard) | 14 |
| US Mainstream Rock Airplay (Billboard) | 4 |
| US Hot R&B/Hip-Hop Songs (Billboard) | 26 |

=== Year-end charts ===
Year-end chart performance for "Abracadabra"
| Chart (1982) | Rank |
|---|---|
| Australia (Kent Music Report) | 13 |
| Canada | 5 |
| Germany | 32 |
| New Zealand | 50 |
| South Africa | 17 |
| US Billboard | 9 |

=== Decade-end charts ===
Decade-end chart performance for "Abracadabra"
| Chart (1980–1989) | Rank |
|---|---|
| US Billboard Hot 100 | 44 |

=== All-time charts ===
| Chart (1958–2018) | Position |
|---|---|
| US Billboard Hot 100 | 99 |

== Certifications ==
Certifications for "Abracadabra"
| Region | Certification | Certified units/sales |
|---|---|---|
| Canada (Music Canada) | Platinum | 100,000^{^} |
| New Zealand (RMNZ) | Gold | 15,000^{‡} |
| United Kingdom (BPI) | Silver | 250,000^{^} |
| United States (RIAA) | 2× Platinum | 2,000,000^{‡} |
^{^} Shipments figures based on certification alone.^{‡} Sales+streaming figures based on certification alone.

== Cover versions and samples ==
- Eagles of Death Metal covered the song on the 2019 cover album Eagles of Death Metal Presents Boots Electric Performing the Best Songs We Never Wrote alongside Shawnee Smith.
- Filipino singer and current Journey frontman Arnel Pineda covered the song along with Whitesnake's Joel Hoekstra, Billy Sheehan, Lenny Castro, Van Romaine and Ollie Marland.
- Sugar Ray covered the song on their 1999 album 14:59; it peaked at #43 on the Radio and Records Pop chart.
- S.O.A.P covered the song on their 2000 album Miracle.
- Rapper Eminem interpolated the song for his 2024 single "Houdini".
- Lebanon Hanover covered the song as a single in 2024.
- The 2007 album Super Eurobeat Vol. 181 contains a eurobeat cover of the song by Italian singer Cherry.

== Depictions in popular media ==
"Abracadabra" was used in the season 14 episode "The Witches of Langley" of the animated television series American Dad! during a musical montage when Steve and his friends take up witchcraft to gain popularity at school. The song also featured in the British sitcom Not Going Out episode "Magic" when Lee and Lucy are rehearsing their magic act. It was also used in the 2013 film The Incredible Burt Wonderstone and in an audition scene in the 2021 film Sing 2.

== See also ==
- List of Billboard Hot 100 number-one singles of 1982
