= Circle of Love (Steve Miller Band album) =

Album by Steve Miller Band

Studio album by Steve Miller Band
- Released: October 23, 1981
- Genre: Rock
- Length: 34:58
- Label: Capitol
- Producer: Steve Miller

Steve Miller Band chronology
Greatest Hits 1974-78 (1978)	Circle of Love (1981)	Abracadabra (1982)

Singles from Circle of Love
- 1. "Heart Like a Wheel" Released: 23 October 1981 (US); 2. "Circle of Love" Released: January 1982; 3. "Macho City" Released: 12 February 1982 (UK)

Circle of Love is the eleventh studio album by American rock band Steve Miller Band. Released on October 23, 1981, by Capitol Records, Circle of Love was the Steve Miller Band's first album of new material since the May 1977 release Book of Dreams. (The band's Greatest Hits 1974–78 compilation disc had been issued in November 1978.) In its original vinyl album format, Circle of Love featured a total of five tracks, Side 2 of the album comprising one extended track, "Macho City" (18:32). A much shorter edit of the track was later used for CD releases.

Although Circle of Love was certified Gold for sales of 500,000 units in December 1981 the album, with its lead single "Heart Like a Wheel" only managing to reach #24 in the US (and #17 in Canada), was a commercial disappointment in contrast to the band's three preceding albums which had all reached million-selling Platinum status.

== Critical reception ==
Professional ratings
Review scores
Source	Rating
AllMusic	3/5 stars
The Encyclopedia of Popular Music	3/5 stars
Rolling Stone	2/5 stars

Record World called the title track a "pretty ballad [that] features warm, pinpoint harmony choruses and a unique guitar bridge."

== Track listing ==
All songs written by Steve Miller, except "Get On Home", which is Traditional, with new lyrics and arrangement by Miller.

Side A
No.	Title	Length
1.	"Heart Like a Wheel"	3:55
2.	"Get On Home"	3:58
3.	"Baby Wanna Dance"	2:11
4.	"Circle of Love"	6:22

Side B
No.	Title	Length
1.	"Macho City"	18:32

- Early CD and some vinyl versions of the album featured the same tracks with slightly different durations, "Macho City" being shortened to 16:24.

== Personnel ==
- Steve Miller – vocals, guitar
- Byron Allred – keyboards
- Gerald Johnson – bass guitar
- Gary Mallaber – drums, percussion

Additional personnel

- Recording engineer – Rick Fisher
- Art – Stephen Peringer
- Design – John Browning/Ken Trimpe
- Calligraphy – Greg Stadler

== Charts ==
Chart performance for Circle of Love
Chart (1981)	Peak position
Australian Albums (Kent Music Report)	48
Canada Top Albums/CDs (RPM)	27
Dutch Albums (Album Top 100)	14
New Zealand Albums (RMNZ)	38
Swedish Albums (Sverigetopplistan)	35
US Billboard 200	26
