= Living in the 20th Century =

Album by Steve Miller Band

Studio album by Steve Miller Band
- Released: November 1986
- Recorded: 1986
- Genre: Rock
- Length: 36:14
- Label: Capitol
- Producer: Steve Miller

Steve Miller Band chronology
Italian X Rays (1984)	Living in the 20th Century (1986)	Born 2 B Blue (1988)

Professional ratings
Review scores
Source	Rating
AllMusic	2/5 stars
Encyclopedia of Popular Music	3/5 stars

Living in the 20th Century is the fourteenth studio album by American rock band Steve Miller Band. The album was released in November 1986, by Capitol Records. The song "I Want to Make the World Turn Around" spent six consecutive weeks at the top of the Album Rock Tracks chart in the U.S. at the end of 1986.

== Track listing ==
No.	Title	Writer(s)	Length
1.	"Nobody But You Baby"	Steve Miller	4:04
2.	"I Want To Make The World Turn Around"	Miller	4:26
3.	"Slinky"	Miller	2:40
4.	"Living in the 20th Century"	Miller	3:07
5.	"Maelstrom"	Greg Douglass	4:07
6.	"I Wanna Be Loved (But by Only You)"	Jimmy Reed	2:25
7.	"My Babe"	Willie Dixon	2:53
8.	"Big Boss Man"	Luther Dixon, Al Smith	2:37
9.	"Caress Me Baby"	Reed	3:18
10.	"Ain't That Lovin' You Baby"	Reed	2:51
11.	"Behind the Barn"	Miller	3:38

== Personnel ==
- Steve Miller – vocals, guitar, keyboards, Synclavier
- Kenny Lee Lewis – bass guitar, guitar
- Byron Allred – keyboards
- Gary Mallaber – drums, percussion

Additional personnel

- Gerald Johnson – bass guitar on tracks 6, 7, 8 & 9
- Kenny G – saxophone on track 2
- Greg Douglass – guitar on track 5
- James Cotton – harmonica on track 11
- Norton Buffalo – harmonica on tracks 10 & 11
- Lonnie Turner – bass guitar on track 5
- Les Dudek – dobro on track 11
- Charles Calimise – bass guitar on tracks 10 & 11
- Kenny Johnson – drums on tracks 10 & 11
- Joachim Young – piano on track 11

== Charts ==
Chart performance for Living in the 20th Century
Chart (1986)	Peak position
Australian Albums (Kent Music Report)	38
US Billboard 200	65
