= I Want to Make the World Turn Around =

Single by Steve Miller Band

from the album Living in the 20th Century
- Released: November 1986 (US): March 1987 (UK)
- Recorded: 1986
- Genre: Rock, new wave
- Length: 4:26
- Label: Capitol
- Songwriter: Steve Miller
- Producer: Steve Miller

Steve Miller Band singles chronology
| "Keeps Me Wondering Why" (1982) | "I Want to Make the World Turn Around" (1986) |

"I Want to Make the World Turn Around" is a single from Steve Miller Band's album Living in the 20th Century, released in November 1986. It reached number 97 on the Billboard Hot 100 and number one on the Album Rock Tracks chart, where it stayed for six straight weeks. In Australia, it peaked at No. 72 on the Kent Music Report.

The sax solo is performed by jazz-pop saxophonist, Kenny G.
