= Wide River =

Studio album by Steve Miller Band
- Released: June 8, 1993
- Genre: Rock
- Length: 53:08
- Label: Sailor/Polydor
- Producer: Steve Miller

Steve Miller Band chronology
The Very Best of the Steve Miller Band (1991)	Wide River (1993)	Bingo! (2010)

Professional ratings
Review scores
Source	Rating
AllMusic	2/5 stars
The Encyclopedia of Popular Music	2/5 stars
Rolling Stone	3.5/5 stars
The Village Voice	C

Wide River is the fifteenth album by American rock band the Steve Miller Band, released in 1993. The title track was their last Billboard Hot 100 single, peaking at No. 64. It is their last album of original material to date, and would also be their last studio album until Bingo! in 2010. As of 2010, sales in the United States have exceeded 258,000 copies, according to Nielsen SoundScan. It was re-released on vinyl by Sailor Records in 2016. In addition, May 24, 2019, saw the re-release again of Wide River on exclusive translucent light blue vinyl, by UMe Label, and on black vinyl.

== Track listing ==
No.	Title	Writer(s)	Length
1.	"Wide River"	Chris McCarty, Steve Miller	4:00
2.	"Midnight Train"	McCarty, Miller, Kenny Lee Lewis	4:20
3.	"Blue Eyes"	Miller, Les Dudek, Rocket Richotte	5:10
4.	"Lost in Your Eyes"	Leo Sidran	3:47
5.	"Perfect World"	Sidran	5:30
6.	"Horse and Rider"	McCarty, Miller	4:10
7.	"Circle of Fire"	David Denny	3:46
8.	"Conversation"	Sidran, Miller	4:11
9.	"Cry Cry Cry"	Miller	4:19
10.	"Stranger Blues"	Elmore James, Bobby Robinson	4:30
11.	"Walks Like a Lady"	Sidran, Miller	3:58
12.	"All Your Love (I Miss Loving)"	Otis Rush	5:17

== Personnel ==
- Steve Miller – vocals, guitar, producer, mixing
- Billy Peterson – bass guitar, piano
- Gordy Knutson – drums, percussion
- Bob Mallach – saxophone
- Norton Buffalo – harmonica

Additional personnel

- Ben Sidran – keyboards
- Leo Sidran – keyboards, guitar
- David Denny – guitar
- Jay Bird Koder – guitar
- Joey Heinemann – piano

Production

- Steve Wiese – recording engineer, mixing
- Rick Fisher – recording engineer

== Charts ==
Chart performance for Wide River
Chart (1993)	Peak position
German Albums (Offizielle Top 100)	81
US Billboard 200	85
