= Anthology (Steve Miller Band album) =

Greatest hits album by Steve Miller Band
- Released: November 1972
- Recorded: 1968–1972
- Genre: Rock
- Length: 63:24
- Label: Capitol / EMI

Steve Miller Band chronology
Recall the Beginning...A Journey from Eden (1972)	Anthology (1972)	The Joker (1973)

Anthology is the first greatest hits album for the Steve Miller Band, covering material from their first seven albums (though there are no selections from either Children of the Future or Rock Love). It has been certified Gold in the United States.

== Critical reception ==
Professional ratings
Review scores
Source	Rating
Christgau's Record Guide	B+
Encyclopedia of Popular Music	5/5 stars

In a retrospective review for Allmusic, Stephen Thomas Erlewine feels that the album captures Miller's "first-rate" and "effective" early space blues, and that the songs are less commercial and "catchy" than those on Miller's later Greatest Hits album.

== Track listing ==
Side 1

1. "I Love You" (Miller) – 2:46 - from Number 5 (1970)
2. "Going To The Country" (Miller, Sidran) – 3:14 (Number 5)
3. "Baby's House" (Hopkins, Miller) – 8:07 - from Your Saving Grace (1969)
4. "Kow Kow Calqulator" (Miller) – 4:26 - from Brave New World (1969)

Side 2

5. "Your Saving Grace" (Davis, Miller, Sidran) – 4:50 (Your Saving Grace)
6. "Going To Mexico" (Miller, Scaggs) – 2:29 (Number 5)
7. "Space Cowboy" (Miller, Sidran) – 4:55 (Brave New World)
8. "Living In The U.S.A." (Miller) – 4:06 - from Sailor (1968)

Side 3

9. "Journey From Eden" (Miller) – 6:25 - from Recall the Beginning...A Journey from Eden (1972)
10. "Seasons" (Miller, Sidran) – 3:51 (Brave New World)
11. "Motherless Children" (Traditional) – 4:22 (Your Saving Grace)
12. "Never Kill Another Man" (Miller) – 2:44 (Number 5)

Side 4

13. "Don't You Let Nobody Turn You Around" (Miller) – 2:29 (Your Saving Grace)
14. "Little Girl" (Miller) – 3:24 (Your Saving Grace)
15. "Celebration Song" (Miller, Sidran) – 2:32 (Brave New World)
16. "My Dark Hour" (Miller) – 3:08 (Brave New World)

"Going To The Country", "Baby's House" and "Motherless Children" are shorter edits than their original LP versions.

== Personnel ==
- Steve Miller – guitar, vocals, harmonica, bass
- Boz Scaggs – vocals, guitar
- Paul McCartney – vocals, bass, drums on "My Dark Hour"
- Tim Davis – vocals, drums, percussion
- James Curley Cook – guitar
- Buddy Spicher – violin
- Charlie McCoy – harmonica
- Nicky Hopkins – piano, organ
- Dick Thompson – piano, organ (credited as Richard Thompson)
- Ben Sidran – piano, keyboards
- James Peterman organ, vocals
- Lee Michaels – organ
- Gerald Johnson – organ
- Lonnie Turner – bass -(most songs) - organ
- Bob Winkelman – bass
- Gary Mallaber – drums
- Glyn Johns – vocals
- Thomas Lunde – album art
