= Italian X Rays =

Album by Steve Miller Band

Studio album by Steve Miller Band
- Released: October 1984
- Recorded: 1984
- Genres: Rock, new wave, synth-pop
- Length: 37:19
- Label: Capitol
- Producers: Steve Miller, Byron Allred, Kenny Lee Lewis, Gary Mallaber

Steve Miller Band chronology
Steve Miller Band Live! (1983)	Italian X Rays (1984)	Living in the 20th Century (1986)

Professional ratings
Review scores
Source	Rating
AllMusic	2/5 stars
Encyclopedia of Popular Music	2/5 stars

Italian X Rays is the thirteenth studio album by American rock band Steve Miller Band. The album was released in October 1984, by Capitol Records. "Who Do You Love?" and "Out of the Night" were songs co-written by Steve Miller and Tim Davis. Tim Davis had been a co-founder of the Steve Miller Band and had been a drummer, singer and songwriter with the band during its first five albums, released between 1968 and 1970. As of 1984, Davis was suffering from the effects of diabetes, and died four years later.

The album contained two minor hit singles, “Shangri-La” (No. 57 on the Billboard Hot 100) and, “Bongo Bongo” (No. 84 on the Billboard Hot 100). Music videos were also made to accompany both tracks.

Referring to "Out of the Night", Steve Miller wrote, in the liner notes to the Steve Miller Band Box Set (1994), "This is the last song I wrote with Tim Davis. Tim was dying at the time from diabetes and it had taken a terrible toll on him. But he never lost his good humor."

== Track listing ==
No.	Title	Writer(s)	Length
1.	"Radio 1"	Byron Allred	0:37
2.	"Italian X Rays"	Steve Miller, Gary Mallaber	4:40
3.	"Daybreak"	Allred	2:38
4.	"Shangri-La"	Miller, Kenny Lee Lewis	5:04
5.	"Who Do You Love?"	Miller, Tim Davis	2:56
6.	"Harmony of the Spheres 1"	Allred	1:46
7.	"Radio 2"	Allred	0:35
8.	"Bongo Bongo"	Miller, Chris McCarty	3:12
9.	"Out of the Night"	Miller, Davis	3:46
10.	"Golden Opportunity"	Mallaber, Lewis	3:32
11.	"The Hollywood Dream"	Miller, Allred	3:51
12.	"One in a Million"	Miller	3:43
13.	"Harmony of the Spheres 2"	Allred	0:53

== Personnel ==
- Steve Miller – vocals, guitar, Synclavier, keyboards
- Kenny Lee Lewis – bass guitar, guitar
- Byron Allred – keyboards
- Gary Mallaber – drums, percussion

== Charts ==
Chart performance for Italian X Rays
Chart (1984)	Peak position
Canada Top Albums/CDs (RPM)	88
Swedish Albums (Sverigetopplistan)	49
US Billboard 200	106
