= Gangster of Love =

Song written by Johnny "Guitar" Watson

Single by Johnny "Guitar" Watson
- B-side: "One Room Country Shack"
- Released: 1957
- Recorded: 1957
- Genre: Blues
- Length: 2:48
- Label: Keen
- Songwriter: John Watson a.k.a. Johnny "Guitar" Watson

"Gangster of Love" is a blues song recorded by Johnny "Guitar" Watson in 1957. When he re-recorded the song in 1978, it became a hit. It is perhaps Watson's best known song and several artists have recorded interpretations.

== Original song ==
Johnny "Guitar" Watson first recorded a demo version of "Gangster of Love" while he was with RPM Records in the mid-1950s. In 1957, he recorded a version of the song, a mid-tempo blues shuffle featuring a stop-time arrangement, which was released by Keen Records. The single did not appear in the record charts. However, with Johnny Otis producing, Watson re-recorded the song in 1963 for King Records. The newer recording gained wider exposure, but again did not reach the charts.

== 1970s version ==
In 1978, during his "flamboyant funkster" phase, Watson's recorded an updated "Gangster of Love" for DJM Records. It became a hit, reaching number 32 during a stay of thirteen weeks on Billboard's Hot Soul Singles chart. The song was a feature of his live shows, with some performances playing up the gangster theme with a simulated siren and a mock police bulletin. Most versions open with:

Jesse James and Frank James, Billy the Kid all the rest
Supposed to be some bad cats, out in the West
But when they dug me, and my gangster ways
They hung up their guns, and made it to the grave
'Cause I'm a gangster of love

== Legacy ==
Author David Ritz has identified "Gangster of Love" as Watson's "most famous song" and the different recordings have been released on numerous compilations of Watson's music. Additionally, the song has been adapted by a variety of artists. The Steve Miller Band recorded it for their album Sailor (1968). In an album review for AllMusic, Amy Hanson commented:

[Miller's Sailor] is the LP that introduced many to the Johnny "Guitar" Watson classic "Gangster of Love", a song that would become almost wholly Miller's own, giving the fans an alter ego to caress long before "The Joker" arose to show his hand.

In 1973, "The Joker", written by Miller, was his first number one hit and included the line "some call me the gangster of love".
