= Recall the Beginning...A Journey from Eden =

Studio album by Steve Miller Band
- Released: March 1972
- Recorded: January 29, 1972
- Genre: Rock
- Length: 34:44
- Label: Capitol
- Producer: Ben Sidran

Steve Miller Band chronology
Rock Love (1971)	Recall the Beginning...A Journey from Eden (1972)	Anthology (1972)

Professional ratings
Review scores
Source	Rating
AllMusic	3.5/5 stars
Christgau's Record Guide	C−
The Encyclopedia of Popular Music	4/5 stars

Recall the Beginning...A Journey from Eden is the seventh studio album by American rock band Steve Miller Band. The album was released in March 1972, by Capitol Records. Like his previous album, Rock Love, this album did not meet with much success.

It was voted number 2 in the 50 All-Time Long Forgotten Gems from Colin Larkin's All Time Top 1000 Albums.

== Track listing ==
All tracks written by Steve Miller.

Side One
No.	Title	Length
1.	"Welcome"	1:18
2.	"Enter Maurice"	3:53
3.	"High on You Mama"	3:42
4.	"Heal Your Heart"	3:22
5.	"The Sun Is Going Down"	1:37
6.	"Somebody Somewhere Help Me"	2:37

Side Two
No.	Title	Length
7.	"Love's Riddle"	3:25
8.	"Fandango"	3:57
9.	"Nothing Lasts"	4:08
10.	"Journey from Eden"	6:45

== Personnel ==
- Steve Miller – guitar, vocals
- Gerald Johnson – bass guitar
- Ben Sidran – keyboards
- Dick Thompson – keyboards
- Jim Keltner – drums
- Roger Allen Clark – drums
- Gary Mallaber – drums
- Jack King – drums

Additional personnel

- Jesse Ed Davis – guitar on "Heal Your Heart"
- Nick DeCaro – strings, horns
- Produced by Ben Sidran
- Recorded and balanced by Bruce Botnick
- Photography – Bill Walker
- Art direction – John Hoernle
- Album design & Serigraphy – Tom Lunde
- Album Coordinator – Lester T. Pouncy
- Recording completed on January 29, 1972
