= Swingtown (song) =

Single by Steve Miller Band

from the album Book of Dreams
- B-side: "Winter Time"
- Released: 7 October 1977 (US): 6 January 1978 (UK)
- Recorded: 1975–1976
- Studio: CBS (San Francisco, California)
- Genre: Blues rock, rock and roll, progressive rock
- Length: 3:27 (single version); 3:54 (album version)
- Label: Capitol Records
- Songwriters: Steve Miller, C. McCarty
- Producer: Steve Miller

Steve Miller Band singles chronology
"Jungle Love" (1977)	"Swingtown" (1977)	"Heart Like a Wheel" (1981)

Official audio
- "Swingtown" on YouTube

"Swingtown" is a 1977 hit song by the Steve Miller Band. It was their third and final single release from their Book of Dreams album, and became the second biggest hit from the album.

"Swingtown" reached No. 17 on the U.S. Hot 100 and spent two weeks at No. 13 on the Cashbox Hot 100. It also peaked at No. 13 on the Canadian Singles Chart.

== Reception ==
Cashbox said that it "centers around an infectious drum/bass riff." Record World said that it is "as compelling a bit of melody as [Miller has] written."

== Chart performance ==
=== Weekly charts ===
Chart (1977–78)	Peak position
Canada Top Singles (RPM)	13
US Billboard Hot 100	17
U.S. Cash Box Top 100	13

=== Year-end charts ===
Chart (1977)	Rank
Canada	156
U.S. (Joel Whitburn's Pop Annual)	118

== Use in media ==
In late 1978 and 1979, Ford used an edit from the instrumental sections of the song in its television ads for the '79 Ford Mustang.

"Swingtown" appears in the soundtrack of the 1994 film My Girl 2.

"Swingtown" is used in the 2000 episode entitled "D-Girl" from the second season of the HBO series, The Sopranos.

"Swingtown" is a popular song sung by students at the University of Wisconsin–Madison, especially at Wisconsin football games at Camp Randall Stadium in Madison, Wisconsin. The Wisconsin Marching Band plays it and the students sing the "O-OOOOO-O-O-O-O-O-O-O" part of the song ending it with the word "sucks" to refer to section "O" of the student section, the "sucks" is chanted by other student sections especially section P, this is usually followed by a chant of "fuck you, eat shit" by student sections O and P. Despite the song being popular among the students, several attempts to have the song banned by the UW staff and the Chancellor have been attempted due to the controversial "fuck you, eat shit" chant, but the banning of the song has so far proven to be unsuccessful. Steve Miller, himself a graduate of the University of Wisconsin and vocalist of the Steve Miller Band guest conducted the song with The Wisconsin Marching Band.

It appears in promotions for the 2022 The Players golf tournament.

== Inspiration for Ozzy Osbourne's "Crazy Train" ==
Guitarist Greg Leon, who initially took Randy Rhoads' place in Quiet Riot, claims that the iconic verse riff to Ozzy Osbourne's "Crazy Train" came about when he and Rhoads were messing around with "Swingtown". “We were hanging out, and I showed him the riff to Steve Miller’s "Swingtown". I said: "Look what happens when you speed this riff up". We messed around, and the next thing I know he took it to a whole other level and end up writing the "Crazy Train" riff.”
