= Number 5 (Steve Miller Band album) =

Studio album by Steve Miller Band
- Released: July 1970
- Studios: Cinderella Sound (Nashville, Tennessee)
- Genres: Mexican folk; folk rock; psychedelic rock; blues rock
- Length: 36:22
- Label: Capitol
- Producer: Steve Miller

Steve Miller Band chronology
Your Saving Grace (1969)	Number 5 (1970)	Rock Love (1971)

Professional ratings
Review scores
Source	Rating
AllMusic	4/5 stars
Christgau's Record Guide	B
Rolling Stone	unfavorable
Encyclopedia of Popular Music	4/5 stars

Number 5 is the fifth studio album by American rock band Steve Miller Band. The album was released in July 1970, by Capitol Records. It is the last of the group's albums to feature original drummer Tim Davis. The album reached number 23 on the Billboard 200 album chart.

== Track listing ==
Side One
No.	Title	Writer(s)	Length
1.	"Good Morning"	Bobby Winkelman	2:48
2.	"I Love You"	Steve Miller	2:45
3.	"Going to the Country"	Miller; Ben Sidran	3:47
4.	"Hot Chili"	Tim Davis	3:30
5.	"Tokin's"	Davis	4:23

Side Two
No.	Title	Writer(s)	Length
6.	"Going to Mexico"	Miller; Boz Scaggs	2:29
7.	"Steve Miller's Midnight Tango"	Sidran	2:40
8.	"Industrial Military Complex Hex"	Miller	3:54
9.	"Jackson-Kent Blues"	Miller	7:18
10.	"Never Kill Another Man"	Miller	2:42

== Personnel ==
=== Steve Miller Band ===
- Steve Miller — lead vocals (tracks 2, 3, 6–10), guitar (track 2, 6–9), 12-string guitar (tracks 2, 3, 10), piano (track 1), backing vocals (tracks 1, 5), bass (track 4), Condor Innovator guitar (track 6), Echoplex guitar (track 9)
- Bobby Winkelmann — bass (tracks 1–3, 6, 8, 9), backing vocals (tracks 2, 5, 8), lead vocals (tracks 1), 12-string guitar (track 1)
- Tim Davis — drums (tracks 1, 3–6, 8, 9), backing vocals (tracks 1, 2, 8), lead vocals (tracks 4, 5)

=== Additional personnel ===
- Jim Miller — guitar (tracks 1, 9)
- Charlie McCoy — harmonica (tracks 2, 3, 5)
- Buddy Spicher — violin (track 3)
- Bud Billings — trumpet (track 4)
- Curley Cooke — acoustic guitar (track 4), guitar (track 6)
- Nicky Hopkins — piano (tracks 4, 8, 10)
- Bobby Thompson — banjo (track 5)
- Wayne Moss — guitar (track 5), bass (track 5)
- Lee Michaels — organ (track 6)
- Ben Sidran — keyboards (track 7)
- Jimmy Tillman — drums (track 7)
- Lonnie Turner — fretless bass (track 10)
