= Jet Airliner (Steve Miller Band song) =

Single by Steve Miller Band

from the album Book of Dreams
- B-side: "Babes in the Wood"
- Released: April 1977
- Recorded: May 1975
- Studio: CBS (San Francisco, California)
- Genre: Rock; heartland rock; boogie rock
- Length: 5:28 (album version with "Threshold"); 4:25 (album version); 3:33 (single version)
- Label: Mercury; Capitol
- Songwriter: Paul Pena
- Producer: Steve Miller

Steve Miller Band singles chronology
"Fly Like an Eagle" (1976)	"Jet Airliner" (1977)	"Jungle Love" (1977)

Official audio
- "Jet Airliner" on YouTube

"Jet Airliner" is a song composed by Paul Pena in 1973 and popularized by the Steve Miller Band in 1977.

== History ==
Pena wrote and recorded "Jet Airliner" in 1973 for his New Train album. However, New Train was not released until 2000, due to conflicts between him and his label.

Steve Miller heard Pena's unreleased New Train album through Ben Sidran, who produced it, and who was formerly in Miller's band. Miller recorded "Jet Airliner" in 1975 during sessions for the Fly Like an Eagle album, but the song was not released until 1977, when it was included on Miller's Book of Dreams album. The single reached No. 8 on the Billboard chart. In Canada, the song spent two weeks at No. 3.

On classic rock radio, Miller's "Jet Airliner" is generally played in tandem with "Threshold", the all-synthesizer instrumental that precedes it on Book of Dreams and the Greatest Hits 1974–78 compilation.

Cash Box said that it "has the best of Miller's past and present, including impeccable harmonies and a deep guitar arrangement that pumps along steadily."

== Chart performance ==
=== Weekly charts ===
Chart (1977)	Peak position
Australia (Kent Music Report)	23
Canada RPM Top Singles	3
Netherlands (Single Top 100)	11
New Zealand (Recorded Music NZ)	12
U.S. Billboard Hot 100	8
U.S. Cash Box Top 100	3

=== Year-end charts ===
Chart (1977)	Rank
Canada	44
U.S. Billboard Hot 100	62
U.S. Cash Box	44
