= Fly Like an Eagle (album) =

Studio album by Steve Miller Band
- Released: May 15, 1976
- Recorded: 1975–1976
- Studios: CBS (San Francisco, California)
- Genres: Blues rock; pop rock; space rock
- Length: 38:07
- Labels: Capitol; Mercury
- Producer: Steve Miller

Steve Miller Band chronology
The Joker (1973)	Fly Like an Eagle (1976)	Book of Dreams (1977)

Singles from Fly Like an Eagle
- 1. "Take the Money and Run" Released: April 26, 1976; 2. "Rock'n Me" Released: August 1976 (US); 3. "Fly Like an Eagle" Released: August 13, 1976 (UK); 4. "Serenade" Released: January 28, 1977 (UK)

Fly Like an Eagle is the ninth studio album by American rock band Steve Miller Band, released on May 15, 1976, by Capitol Records in the United States, Canada and Japan and Mercury Records in Europe. The album was a commercial success, spawning three hit singles: the title track, "Take the Money and Run" and "Rock'n Me", and was later certified 4× Platinum by the Recording Industry Association of America (RIAA).

Fly Like an Eagle was voted number 400 in the third edition of Colin Larkin's All Time Top 1000 Albums (2000). In 2012, the album was ranked number 445 on Rolling Stone magazine's list of the "500 Greatest Albums of All Time." It remains a staple of rock, with its singles having remained in constant rotation on classic rock radio in the United States and worldwide. In 2025, the album was deemed "culturally, historically, or aesthetically significant" by the Library of Congress and selected for preservation in the National Recording Registry.

On the album's cover, Miller is posing with a black left-handed Fender Stratocaster that Jimi Hendrix had originally ordered from Manny's Music, but which Miller ended up purchasing (Hendrix died before it arrived) and re-stringing for right-handed playing. The guitar was stolen after the album's release.

== Critical reception ==
Professional ratings
Review scores
Source	Rating
AllMusic	4.5/5 stars
Christgau's Record Guide	B+
Rolling Stone	(favorable)
The Village Voice	B−
Encyclopedia of Popular Music	4/5 stars

Stephen Thomas Erlewine in a retrospective review for AllMusic felt that "the focus brings about his strongest set of songs (both originals and covers), plus a detailed atmospheric production where everything fits." However, he said that "it still can sound fairly dated", but concluded the review by saying that "its best moments [...] are classics of the idiom." Rolling Stone voted it 1976's Best Album. Jay Cridlin of the Tampa Bay Times described "Dance, Dance, Dance" as "the best John Denver song John Denver never recorded".

== Track listing ==
Side one
No.	Title	Writer(s)	Length
1.	"Space Intro" (Instrumental)	Steve Miller	1:15
2.	"Fly Like an Eagle"	Miller	4:42
3.	"Wild Mountain Honey"	Steve McCarty	4:51
4.	"Serenade"	Miller; Chris McCarty	3:13
5.	"Dance, Dance, Dance"	Miller; Joseph Cooper; Brenda Cooper	2:18
6.	"Mercury Blues"	K. C. Douglas; Bob Geddins	3:30

Side two
No.	Title	Writer(s)	Length
7.	"Take the Money and Run"	Miller	2:50
8.	"Rock'n Me"	Miller	3:05
9.	"You Send Me" (*)	Sam Cooke	2:42
10.	"Blue Odyssey" (Instrumental)	Miller	1:00
11.	"Sweet Maree"	Miller	4:16
12.	"The Window"	Miller; Joseph Cooper	4:19

* Contains a brief sample from Cheech & Chong's comedy routine "Championship Wrestling" (from Cheech & Chong's Wedding Album, 1974), inserted after the first verse. The sample includes the words "...c'mon, don't be nervous!"

== Personnel ==
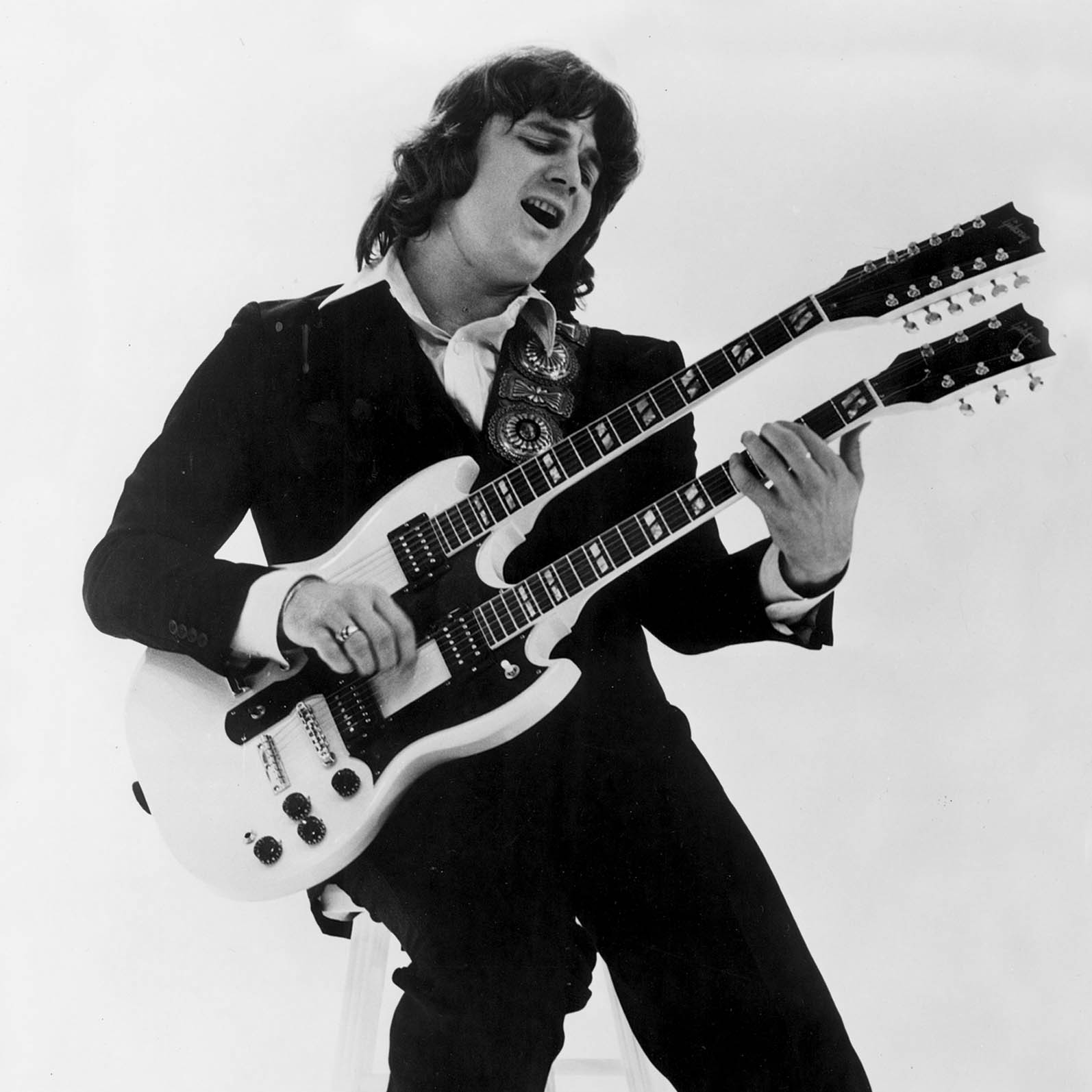
Miller in 1977 with his Gibson EDS-1275

=== Steve Miller Band ===
- Steve Miller – lead vocals, guitar, keyboards, sitar, ARP Odyssey (on tracks 1, 2, 10, 12), producer
- Lonnie Turner – bass (on all tracks but 12)
- Gary Mallaber – drums (on all tracks but 12)

=== Additional personnel ===
- James Cotton – harmonica (on track 11)
- Curley Cooke – guitar (on track 12)
- Les Dudek – guitar (on track 12)
- Charles Calamise – bass (on track 12)
- Kenny Johnson – drums (on track 12)
- John McFee – dobro (on track 5)
- Joachim Young – Hammond B3 organ (on tracks 2 and 12)

=== Technical ===
- John Palladino – executive producer
- Mike Fusaro – recording engineer
- Jim Gains – mastering
- Susan McCardle – photography
- David Stahl – photography

== Quadraphonic and original editions ==
A Quadraphonic mix of the album was available on the Quadraphonic 8-Track cartridge format (in which Track 1 - "Space Intro" is edited into "Fly Like an Eagle" as one track, and Track 6 - "Take the Money and Run" intro repeats twice).

On the U.K. original vinyl release "Space Intro" does not appear on track listing. A 40-second track called "Space Odyssey" segues into "Wild Mountain Honey".

== Charts ==
=== Weekly charts ===
Chart (1976)	Peak position
Canadian Top Albums	4
Netherlands Top 100 Albums	7
UK Albums Chart	11
US Billboard 200	3

Chart (1977)	Peak position
German Albums (Offizielle Top 100)	20
New Zealand Top 40 Albums	16
US R&B Albums	19

=== Year-end charts ===
Chart (1976)	Position
Canada Top Albums/CDs (RPM)	32
US Billboard 200	46
Chart (1977)	Position
Canada Top Albums/CDs (RPM)	48
US Billboard 200	11

== Certifications ==
Region	Certification	Certified units/sales
Canada (Music Canada)	2× Platinum	200,000^{^}
United Kingdom (BPI)	Gold	100,000^{^}
United States (RIAA)	4× Platinum	4,000,000^{^}
^{^} Shipments figures based on certification alone.
