= Fly Like an Eagle (song) =

1976 single by Steve Miller Band

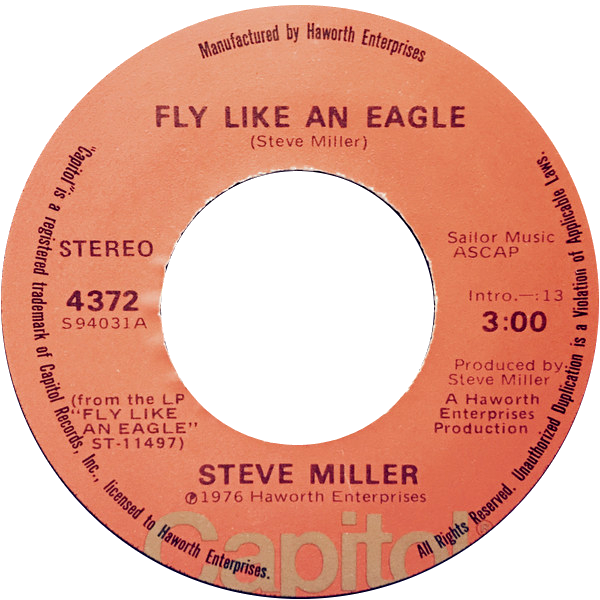
- An A-side label of the US vinyl single

Single by Steve Miller Band

from the album Fly Like an Eagle
- B-side: "Lovin' Cup"
- Released: August 13, 1976
- Recorded: 1976
- Studio: CBS (San Francisco, California)
- Genre: Rock; synth-funk; psychedelic rock
- Length: 4:42 (album version); 5:57 (album version with "Space Intro"); 3:00 (single version)
- Label: Capitol
- Songwriter: Steve Miller
- Producer: Steve Miller

Steve Miller Band singles chronology
"Rock'n Me" (1976)	"Fly Like an Eagle" (1976)	"Jet Airliner" (1977)

Music video
- "Space Intro" / "Fly Like an Eagle" on YouTube

"Fly Like an Eagle" is a song written by American musician Steve Miller. The song was released in the United Kingdom in August 1976 and in the United States in December 1976. It went to number two on the US Billboard Hot 100 for the week of March 12, 1977. The single edit can be found on Greatest Hits (1974–1978). It is often played in tandem with "Space Intro". On the album, the song segues into "Wild Mountain Honey".

== Background ==
The band first performed the song in 1973 while performing at New York City's Felt Forum on a bill with The Marshall Tucker Band, Buddy Guy, and Junior Wells.

An earlier 1973 version features a more bluesy and less funk-inspired rhythm, with the guitar taking the synthesizer parts (albeit with similar delay effects). Miller described earlier iterations of the song as being a "15- or 20-minute thing that went in all kinds of different places because of the freedom of the whole psychedelic music scene."

It was re-recorded for the eponymous album released in 1976. The initial studio sessions consisted of Miller with Gerald Johnson and Gary Mallaber on bass and drums respectively. Following some unsuccessful attempts at Capitol Studios and Wally Heider Studios, Miller reconvened at Pacific Union in San Francisco with the same lineup in addition to Joachim Young on Hammond organ. Once this configuration achieved a satisfactory take, Miller mixed the song down to a portable 3M eight-track machine and conducted guitar and vocal overdubs at his home studio in Novato, California. He used a Fender Stratocaster connected to a Fender Bassman with an Echoplex to provide a staggered triplet echo effect. For the vocals, Miller sang his parts through an Electro-Voice RE20 and compressed the audio signal with a Shure Level Loc.

When discussing the inclusion of the synthesizer on "Fly Like An Eagle", Miller mentioned that he had experimented with electronic music and sound collages in the 1960s with tape recorders and the Echoplex, having been inspired by the work of La Monte Young and Karlheinz Stockhausen. The synthesizer was recorded in one take after the track was mixed. "Fly Like an Eagle" was mixed on three different occasions as Miller "didn't want to put that song out until it was really right." When the song was receiving its final mix, the tracks were transferred using a tape that had been bulk erased, resulting in a repeated beeping noise that occurred during the fade-out of the song.

== Reception ==
Billboard described the Steve Miller Band version as "uncharacteristically thoughtful, but rivetingly attention grabbing." Cash Box said that the single edit "preserves the high points of the original while cutting the time just about in half."

The original Steve Miller Band version sold over one million copies. The Seal version had sold over 300,000 units as of April 5, 1997.

== Personnel ==
- Steve Miller – lead vocals, guitar, ARP Odyssey
- Lonnie Turner – bass
- Gary Mallaber – drums
- Joachim Young – Hammond B3 organ

== Charts ==
=== Weekly charts ===
Weekly chart performance for "Fly Like an Eagle"
Chart (1976–1977)	Peak position
Canada Top Singles (RPM)	2
Netherlands (Single Top 100)	21
US Adult Contemporary (Billboard)	38
US Best Selling Soul Singles (Billboard)	20
US Billboard Hot 100	2
US Cash Box Top 100	3

=== Year-end charts ===
Year-end chart performance for "Fly Like an Eagle"
Chart (1977)	Position
Canada Top Singles (RPM)	34
US Billboard Hot 100	28
US Cash Box Top 100	50

== Certifications ==
Certifications for "Fly Like an Eagle"
Region	Certification	Certified units/sales
New Zealand (RMNZ)	Gold	15,000^{‡}
United States (RIAA)	Platinum	1,000,000^{‡}
^{‡} Sales+streaming figures based on certification alone.

== Seal version ==
"Fly Like an Eagle"

Single by Seal

from the album Space Jam: Music from and Inspired by the Motion Picture
- Released: October 22, 1996
- Length: 4:14
- Label: ZTT
- Songwriter: Steve Miller
- Producer: Seal

Seal singles chronology
"Don't Cry" / "Prayer for the Dying" (1995)	"Fly Like an Eagle" (1996)	"Human Beings" (1998)

Space Jam singles chronology
"Fly Like an Eagle" (1996)	"Hit 'Em High (The Monstars' Anthem)" (1996)

Licensed audio
- "Fly Like an Eagle" on YouTube

Twenty years after Miller's original version, British singer-songwriter Seal covered "Fly Like an Eagle" for the soundtrack to the 1996 film Space Jam, sampling Miller's original "Space Intro" parts in the song's chorus. This version was released in the United States in October 1996 and was issued worldwide in early 1997 by ZTT Records. It peaked at number 10 on the US Billboard Hot 100, number 13 on the UK Singles Chart, and number two on the Canadian RPM 100 Hit Tracks chart.

According to Seal, the executive producer of the Space Jam soundtrack, Dominique Trenier, asked him to record it. D'Angelo, who was managed by Trenier, played keyboards on the song. Seal said that Steve Miller approved of the cover version and at one point called him "thanking me and saying that was the best cover of the song that he had heard."

=== Critical reception ===
Larry Flick from Billboard magazine felt that the soundtrack to Space Jam "is off to a roaring start, thanks to this faithfully funky rendition of Steve Miller's classic rocker. [...] After the solemn tone of his own compositions in recent years, Seal clearly sounds like he's having a blast as he cruises through the track's rubbery bassline and space-age synths." He added, "In fact, listen closely, and you will catch him vamping a few lines from his breakthrough hit, 'Crazy', toward the end." Daina Darzin from Cash Box stated that "you couldn't ask for a more perfect take on the song, which Seal makes even more spacey, swirling and effortlessly gorgeous than the original." Matt Diehl from Entertainment Weekly gave the song a B, writing, "Aside from some funky scatting and a dash of hip-hop rhythm, the soul slickster doesn't add much to Steve Miller's '70s classic-rock classic. Seal does get points for good taste in cover material, though: The song's ethereal synthesizer squiggles, wah-wah guitars, and soaring chorus sound great in the '90s. The latest fast break on the charts from the Space Jam soundtrack, it's perfect music for Michael Jordan to slam to."

=== Music video ===
The video has scenes from the movie itself, Seal performs in the sky (both versions), All scenes add real children doing something athletic. The original version shot in black-and-white. Also, the colored version shown where a colored Seal in the black-and-white sky (some scenes swap colors along Seal and in the sky).

=== Personnel ===
- Seal – vocals, guitar, producer
- Earl Harvin – drums
- Armando Colon – bass guitar, keyboards
- D'Angelo – keyboards
- Nile Rodgers – guitar
- Rashad Smith – additional production
- Tim Weidner – engineer, mixing
- Glen Marchese – additional engineering
- Paul Falcone – assistant engineer
- Greg Thompson, Rob Feeney, David Goodermouth – additional assistant engineers

=== Charts ===
==== Weekly charts ====
Weekly chart performance for "Fly Like an Eagle"
Chart (1997)	Peak position
Australia (ARIA)	81
Belgium (Ultratip Bubbling Under Flanders)	7
Canada Adult Contemporary (RPM)	4
Canada Top Singles (RPM)	2
Europe (Eurochart Hot 100)	49
Germany (GfK)	61
Iceland (Íslenski Listinn Topp 40)	18
New Zealand (Recorded Music NZ)	29
Scottish Singles Sales (Official Charts)	20
Switzerland (Schweizer Hitparade)	38
UK Singles (Official Charts)	13
UK Dance (Official Charts)	14
US Billboard Hot 100	10
US Adult Alternative Airplay (Billboard)	14
US Adult Contemporary (Billboard)	9
US Adult Pop Airplay (Billboard)	7
US Hot R&B/Hip-Hop Songs (Billboard)	44
US Pop Airplay (Billboard)	12
US Rhythmic Airplay (Billboard)	36

==== Year-end charts ====
Year-end chart performance for "Fly Like an Eagle"
Chart (1997)	Position
Canada Adult Contemporary (RPM)	36
Canada Top Singles (RPM)	47
US Adult Top 40 (Billboard)	40
US Billboard Hot 100	79
US Top 40/Mainstream (Billboard)	78

=== Release history ===
Release dates and formats for "Fly Like an Eagle"
Region	Date	Format(s)	Label(s)	Ref.
United States	October 22, 1996	Contemporary hit radio	Atlantic; Warner Sunset; ZTT	
Europe	February 10, 1997	CD	ZTT	
Japan	February 25, 1997	CD	WEA	

== Other cover versions ==
- In 1998, the United States Postal Service used the song in television commercials.
- Biz Markie sampled the song in his 1986 song, "Nobody Beats the Biz", that was released on his debut album Goin' Off (1988).
- Vanilla Ice sampled the song in his 1991 single "Rollin' in My 5.0".
- EPMD sampled the song in the song, "You're a Customer", from the album Strictly Business (1988).
- The Neville Brothers covered this song on their album Family Groove in 1992. Steve Miller played some guitar parts on this version.
- Deion Sanders, a former football and baseball player, sampled the song in his song "Prime Time Keeps On Ticking" from his album Prime Time (1994).
- Gospel singer Yolanda Adams covered the song and did the medley from her studio album More Than a Melody (1995).
- In 1998, guitarist Ed Hamilton covered the song from his album Groovology.
- American nu metal band Limp Bizkit reference the song's hook on their song "Crushed", which is featured on the soundtrack of the film End of Days (1999).
- A vocal part was sampled by Nate Dogg in Xzibit's song "Been a Long Time" on the album Restless (2000).
- Portugal. The Man covered the song for the French radio station Mouv'.
- American metal band In This Moment covered the song for their seventh album Mother.
- The Dave Matthews Band has covered the song multiple times during their summer tour series including a July 2019 show in Cincinnati, OH.
- Thundercat covered the song on the soundtrack of the film Minions: The Rise of Gru (2022).
- DJ Premier sampled the song on the track "It's Time", off his collaboration album with Nas, Light-Years (2025).

== Additional information ==
- The song is featured as a playable song in Rock Band 3.
- In 2012, "Fly Like an Eagle" was chosen as "the best-ever song about birds" by Birds & Blooms magazine. "We're not at all surprised by the popularity of Steve Miller's 'Fly Like an Eagle' with our readers," said Birds & Blooms editor Stacy Tornio in a press release. "It's an iconic song for the iconic American bird." Other notable songs on the Birds & Blooms list were Lynyrd Skynyrd's "Free Bird" and the Beatles' "Blackbird".
