= Rock'n Me =

1976 single by Steve Miller Band

- The European release of "Rock'n Me" by Mercury Records.

Single by Steve Miller Band

from the album Fly Like an Eagle
- B-side: "Mercury Blues"
- Released: August 1976 (US): October 1976 (UK)
- Recorded: 1976
- Studio: CBS (San Francisco, California)
- Genre: Pop rock; rock
- Length: 3:05
- Label: Capitol
- Songwriter: Steve Miller
- Producer: Steve Miller

Steve Miller Band singles chronology
"Take the Money and Run" (1976)	"Rock'n Me" (1976)	"Fly Like an Eagle" (1976)

Audio
- "Rock'n Me" on YouTube

"Rock'n Me" (also known as "Rock 'N Me" or "Rock 'N' Me") is a song by American rock band Steve Miller Band, released in 1976 as the second single from the band's ninth studio album Fly Like an Eagle (1976). It was written by primary band leader and songwriter Steve Miller. Miller also produced the song and album. The North American release of the single was generally credited to Steve Miller as an individual, while the European release was generally credited to the Steve Miller Band as a whole group.

The song achieved lasting commercial and critical success, with the publication Billboard labeling it "an immediate audience grabber". It became the band's second #1 hit on the US Billboard Hot 100, where it stayed at the top for one week; it also topped the Canadian RPM Top Singles chart. In later years, the song has been included in several compilation albums such as 1978's Greatest Hits 1974–78 and 1991's The Very Best of the Steve Miller Band.

== Composition ==
Composed for a pop and rock festival atmosphere in B mixolydian, the lyrics and vocals have been labeled as having an 'every man' quality. It is sung from the point of view of someone frequently traveling while keeping a positive, upbeat attitude. Locations mentioned in the song include Phoenix, Arizona; Tacoma, Washington; Philadelphia; Atlanta; and Los Angeles.

Miller has acknowledged that elements of "Rock'n Me", particularly the intro, was a nod to the English rock band Free particularly the band's hit song "All Right Now". He stated:

Yeah, it's a tack on the wall for Paul [Kossoff]. I did one concert in the two years that I was off the road. I went to London and played with Pink Floyd... it was a big, huge outdoor show so we needed a big rock and roll number that was really going to excite everybody. I just put it together and didn't think much about it.

He returned to the subject in an interview with Ultimate Classic Rock Nights, referring to his support slot at Pink Floyd's one-off appearance at Knebworth in June 1975:

I had thought about the gig and I knew they [sic] way it was going to work was, I was going to play just before Pink Floyd... the sun would be going down, it would be really cold, there wouldn’t be any lights on the stage, it would be a lousy time ... I went, 'You know, I’m gonna kick those guys in the butt.' So what I did was, I wrote 'Rock'n Me' as a song to play at a festival, to just get it going.

== Reception ==
Billboard described "Rock'n Me" as a "catchy and highly humorous midtempo rocker," saying that the melody sounds like the Beach Boys and the Eagles in places. Cash Box said that it "draws from the best of rock ’n' roll over the last ten years" and has "hook-filled guitar lines." Record World said it has "an intro reminiscent of Free's 'All Right Now' and vocals and guitar pure Steve Miller."

== In other media ==
The song is a playable track in the video game Rock Band 2, and Tap Tap Revenge 3. It is featured as a radio station track in the video game Grand Theft Auto V.

== Personnel ==
- Steve Miller – guitar, double-tracked lead vocals
- Lonnie Turner – bass
- Gary Mallaber – drums

== Charts ==
=== Weekly charts ===
Chart (1976)	Peak position
Canada Top Singles (RPM)	1
Netherlands (Single Top 100)	22
New Zealand (Recorded Music NZ)	23
South Africa (Springbok)	3
UK Singles (Official Charts)	11
US Billboard Hot 100	1

Chart (1977)	Peak position
Austria (Ö3 Austria Top 40)	25
West Germany (GfK)	28

=== Year-end charts ===
Chart (1976)	Position
Canada Top Singles (RPM)	16

== Certifications ==
Region	Certification	Certified units/sales
New Zealand (RMNZ)	Gold	15,000^{‡}
United States (RIAA)	2× Platinum	2,000,000^{‡}
^{‡} Sales+streaming figures based on certification alone.
