= The Joker (Steve Miller Band song) =

1973 single by Steve Miller Band

Single by Steve Miller Band

from the album The Joker
- B-side: "Something to Believe In"
- Released: October 1973
- Studio: Capitol (Hollywood, California)
- Genre: Rock
- Length: 4:26 (album version); 3:36 (single version)
- Label: Capitol
- Songwriters: Eddie Curtis; Ahmet Ertegun; Steve Miller
- Producer: Steve Miller

Steve Miller Band singles chronology
| "Fandango" (1972) | "The Joker" (1973) | "Your Cash Ain't Nothin' But Trash" (1974) |

Official video
- "The Joker" on YouTube

"Take the Money and Run" (live) / "The Joker" (live)
- Cover of the 1983 live single

Steve Miller Band singles chronology
| "Living in the U.S.A." (live) (1983) | "Take the Money and Run" (live) / "The Joker (live)" (1983) | "Shangri-La" (1984) |

Steve Miller Band singles chronology
| "Ya Ya" (1988) | "The Joker" (1990) | "Wide River" (1993) |

"The Joker" is a song by American rock band Steve Miller Band from their eighth studio album, The Joker (1973). Released as a single in October 1973, the song topped the US Billboard Hot 100 in early 1974 and reached the top 20 in Australia, Canada, and the Netherlands.

More than 16 years later, in September 1990, "The Joker" reached number one on the UK Singles Chart for two weeks after being used in a television advertisement for clothing company Levi's, and caused controversy for keeping Deee-Lite's "Groove Is in the Heart" off the number-one spot. This reissue of "The Joker" also topped the Irish Singles Chart, the New Zealand Singles Chart, the Dutch Nationale Top 100, and the Dutch Top 40.

== Lyrics ==
Miller borrowed from the hit song "Lovey Dovey", which shares the lyric, "You're the cutest thing that I ever did see / I really love your peaches, wanna shake your tree / Lovey dovey, lovey dovey, lovey dovey all the time". Ahmet Ertegun and Eddie Curtis wrote the song, and the Clovers had the highest charting version in 1954.

It is one of two Steve Miller Band songs that feature the nonce word "pompatus". The first line of the lyrics is a reference to the song "Space Cowboy" from Miller's Brave New World album. The following lines refer to two other songs: "Gangster of Love" from Sailor and "Enter Maurice" from Recall the Beginning...A Journey from Eden. The line "some people call me Maurice / 'Cause I speak of the pompatus of love" was written after Miller heard the song "The Letter" by the Medallions. In "The Letter", writer Vernon Green made up the word puppetutes, meaning a paper-doll erotic fantasy figure; however, Miller misheard the word and wrote pompatus instead.

== Critical reception ==
Cash Box said that "The Joker" "is going all the way to become [Miller's] most successful release ever." Record World called it "a smooth piece that is highly reminiscent of Van Morrison" and that "could establish Miller as a potent AM act."

== Chart performance ==
"The Joker" topped the UK Singles Chart upon its reissue in 1990, beating "Groove Is in the Heart" by Deee-Lite. Initially, it was thought both had sold the same number, triggering a rule that, in the event of a tie, the higher position would be awarded to the single that had most increased its sales over the prior week. "The Joker", having grown its sales by 57% compared to 37% for "Groove", thus secured the top spot. It was later determined that a rounding discrepancy had caused the tie, with "The Joker" topping the charts on merit, by 44,118 to 44,110 copies.

== Track listings ==
7-inch single (1973)

1. "The Joker" – 3:36
2. "Something to Believe In" – 4:40

7-inch single (1983 – live version)

1. "The Joker" (live) – 2:55
2. "Take the Money and Run" (live) – 3:49

7-inch single (1990)

1. "The Joker" (single version) – 3:34
2. "Don't Let Nobody Turn You Around" – 2:27

12-inch maxi (1990)

1. "The Joker" (LP version) – 4:22
2. "Don't Let Nobody Turn You Around" – 2:27
3. "Shu Ba Da Du Ma Ma Ma" – 5:39

CD maxi (1990)

1. "The Joker" (single version) – 3:34
2. "Don't Let Nobody Turn You Around" – 2:27
3. "Shu Ba Da Du Ma Ma Ma Ma" – 3:33
4. "Living in the U.S.A." – 3:59

== Personnel ==
- Steve Miller – guitar, lead vocals
- Gerald Johnson – bass, backing vocals
- Dick Thompson – organ
- John King – drums

== Charts ==
=== Weekly charts ===
| Chart (1973–1974) | Peak position |
|---|---|
| Australia (Kent Music Report) | 8 |
| Canada Top Singles (RPM) | 2 |
| Netherlands (Dutch Top 40) | 18 |
| Netherlands (Single Top 100) | 18 |
| US Billboard Hot 100 | 1 |

| Chart (1990–1991) | Peak position |
|---|---|
| Austria (Ö3 Austria Top 40) | 5 |
| Belgium (Ultratop 50 Flanders) | 5 |
| Europe (Eurochart Hot 100) | 2 |
| Finland (Suomen virallinen lista) | 12 |
| France (SNEP) | 33 |
| Germany (GfK) | 7 |
| Ireland (IRMA) | 1 |
| Netherlands (Dutch Top 40) | 1 |
| Netherlands (Single Top 100) | 1 |
| New Zealand (Recorded Music NZ) | 1 |
| Norway (VG-lista) | 2 |
| Sweden (Sverigetopplistan) | 4 |
| Switzerland (Schweizer Hitparade) | 5 |
| UK Singles (Official Charts) | 1 |

=== Year-end charts ===
| Chart (1974) | Position |
|---|---|
| Australia (Kent Music Report) | 58 |
| Canada Top Singles (RPM) | 50 |
| US Billboard Hot 100 | 40 |

| Chart (1990) | Position |
|---|---|
| Belgium (Ultratop) | 35 |
| Europe (Eurochart Hot 100) | 58 |
| Netherlands (Dutch Top 40) | 15 |
| Netherlands (Single Top 100) | 19 |
| Sweden (Topplistan) | 26 |
| UK Singles (OCC) | 24 |

| Chart (1991) | Position |
|---|---|
| Europe (Eurochart Hot 100) | 62 |
| Germany (Media Control) | 54 |
| New Zealand (RIANZ) | 20 |
| Sweden (Topplistan) | 81 |

== Certifications ==
| Region | Certification | Certified units/sales |
|---|---|---|
| New Zealand (RMNZ) | 4× Platinum | 120,000^{‡} |
| Sweden (GLF) | Gold | 25,000^{^} |
| United Kingdom (BPI) | Gold | 400,000^{‡} |
| United States (RIAA) | 7× Platinum | 7,000,000^{‡} |
^{^} Shipments figures based on certification alone.^{‡} Sales+streaming figures based on certification alone.

== Notable covers and samplings ==
American reggae singer Shaggy and Barbadian singer Rayvon's 2001 song "Angel" samples the bassline of the song. It reached No. 1 on the Billboard Hot 100 for the week ending March 31, 2001.

The German hip hop trio Fettes Brot covered The Joker in 2001, translated the lyrics word by word into German and changed the title to "The Grosser". It entered the German Singles Charts at December 17, 2001, stayed there for 11 weeks, and peaked at number 26.

English musician Fatboy Slim covered "The Joker" and released it as a single on February 28, 2005. This version reached number 32 on the UK Singles Chart and number 29 in Ireland.
