= Take the Money and Run (Steve Miller Band song) =

1976 single by Steve Miller Band

Single by Steve Miller Band

from the album Fly Like an Eagle
- B-side: "Sweet Maree"
- Released: April 26, 1976 (US): May 21, 1976 (UK)
- Recorded: 1976
- Studio: CBS (San Francisco, California)
- Genre: Rock
- Length: 2:50
- Label: Capitol
- Songwriter: Steve Miller
- Producer: Steve Miller

Steve Miller Band singles chronology
"The Joker" (1973)	"Take the Money and Run" (1976)	"Rock'n Me" (1976)

Official Audio
- "Take the Money and Run" on YouTube

"Take the Money and Run" is a song recorded in 1976 by the Steve Miller Band. A song about two young (possibly teenage) bandits and the detective pursuing them, it was one of the many hit singles produced by the Steve Miller Band in the 1970s and featured on the 1976 album Fly Like an Eagle. The song peaked at number 11 on the U.S. Billboard Hot 100 and at number 8 in Canada in July 1976 and also charted in Australia.

== Background and writing ==
The song was written as a road trip. Miller drew inspiration from his childhood, when he listened to the radio while on long road trips with his family, and he would sing along to his favorite songs. Because FM radio was capable of clearer stereo sound, this allowed him to make his road trip songs with more layers for a much bigger sound.

This here's a story about Billy Joe and Bobbie Sue
Two young lovers with nothin' better to do
Than sit around the house, get high, and watch the tube
And here's what happened when they decided to cut loose

Billy Joe robs a house in El Paso and shoots its owner, while Bobbie Sue escapes with the proceeds of the robbery. They reunite the next day and flee south through Texas, pursued by Billy Mack, a police detective intent on arresting them.

== Reception ==
Cash Box said that the song gets off to a "fine start" with "spirited drums" and has "intelligent" lyrics and music that is "just as good, maybe better, than "Space Cowboy." Record World said that this "story about an armed robbery is punctuated with some good guitar chording and [Miller's] distinct vocal."

== Personnel ==
- Steve Miller – guitar, double-tracked lead vocals
- Gary Mallaber – drums, percussion
- Lonnie Turner – bass guitar

== Certifications ==
Region	Certification	Certified units/sales
United States (RIAA)	2× Platinum	2,000,000^{‡}
^{‡} Sales+streaming figures based on certification alone.

== Legacy ==
This was the first song Miller let a rap group sample, since he had previously turned down requests to sample his songs. Run-DMC used it in 2001 with Everlast also on vocals. He agreed only after hearing the song and liking what they did with it.

In 2000, the song was covered in country style by Canadian singer Julian Austin on his album Back in Your Life.

In 2006, the 30th Anniversary Edition of the Fly Like An Eagle album was released. The track "Take the Joker and Run" was included as a bonus track and is an acoustic version of "Take the Money and Run" sung over an early version of "The Joker".

In 2026, exactly 50 years after “Take the Money and Run” was released, the song was featured in the Rockstar published video game Grand Theft Auto VI. Players can listen to the song on the in-game radio station “V-Rock”, which plays mainly ‘80s era classic rock hits.
