= Jungle Love (Steve Miller Band song) =

- UK 7" picture sleeve

Single by Steve Miller Band

from the album Book of Dreams
- B-side: "Wish Upon a Star"
- Released: 7 July 1977 (US): 2 September 1977 (UK)
- Recorded: 1975–1976
- Studio: CBS (San Francisco, California)
- Genre: Hard rock; boogie rock
- Length: 3:07
- Label: Capitol
- Songwriters: Lonnie Turner; Greg Douglass
- Producer: Steve Miller

Steve Miller Band singles chronology
"Jet Airliner" (1977)	"Jungle Love" (1977)	"Swingtown" (1977)

"Jungle Love" is a 1977 song by the Steve Miller Band, featured on the album Book of Dreams. It was written by Lonnie Turner (longtime bass player for the Steve Miller Band) and Greg Douglass (a well-known San Francisco sideman who also played with Hot Tuna and Greg Kihn, among many others). It reached No. 23 on the Billboard Hot 100.

According to Greg Douglass, he and Turner wrote the song for Dave Mason, who turned it down. Turner gave a demo of the record to Miller, who liked it, and the Steve Miller Band (with Douglass playing guitar) recorded it in 30 minutes on the last day of recording for Book of Dreams.

Cash Box called it "a hard-rocking, energetic tune" and said that "the vocal here is delivered with a shout, but carefully orchestrated instruments, especially the organ, make a clear statement of each melodic hook." Record World called it an "up-beat, well-produced single-with a synthesizer opening."

== Guitar tuning ==
Greg Douglass' guitar is tuned to 'Open A' (which is, low to high, E-A-E-A-C#-E), and is performed on a 1965 Epiphone Riviera through a Quilter "Duck" amplifier. It is the only guitar on the studio recording.

== Chart history ==
=== Weekly charts ===
Chart (1977)	Peak position
Australia (Kent Music Report)	87
Canada Top Singles (RPM)	18
US Billboard Hot 100	23
U.S. Cash Box Top 100	17

=== Year-end charts ===
Chart (1977)	Rank
Canada	145
US (Joel Whitburn's Pop Annual)	143

== In television ==
"Jungle Love" has been used on multiple occasions in the television series Everybody Loves Raymond. It was featured on the season 6 episode "Snow Day", which aired January 14, 2002: at the end, all the characters, except Marie and Frank, chaotically danced to the song. The song was then used as the opening credits theme music in seasons 7-9.
