= Steve Miller Band =

American rock band

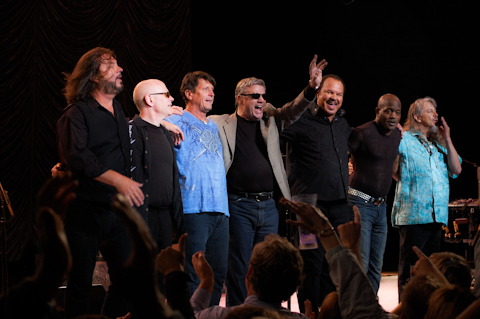
- Steve Miller Band at the Ravinia Festival in 2009

Background information
- Also known as: Steve Miller Blues Band (1966–1967); The Miller Band (1967); The Steve Miller Band (1967–1968)
- Origin: San Francisco, California, U.S.
- Genres: Blues rock; psychedelic rock; pop rock
- Years active: 1966–present
- Labels: Capitol; Mercury; Polydor; Roadrunner; Loud & Proud
- Members: Steve Miller; Kenny Lee Lewis; Joseph Wooten; Jacob Petersen; Ron Wikso
- Past members: See below
- Website: www.stevemillerband.com

The Steve Miller Band is an American rock band formed in San Francisco, California, in 1966. The band is led by Steve Miller on guitar and lead vocals. The group had a string of mid- to late-1970s hit singles that are staples of classic rock radio, as well as several earlier psychedelic rock albums. The band signed with Capitol Records in 1967 and released its debut album, Children of the Future, in February 1968. The band's album Greatest Hits 1974–78, released in 1978, has sold over 13 million copies. In 2016, Steve Miller was inducted as a solo artist into the Rock and Roll Hall of Fame.

== History ==
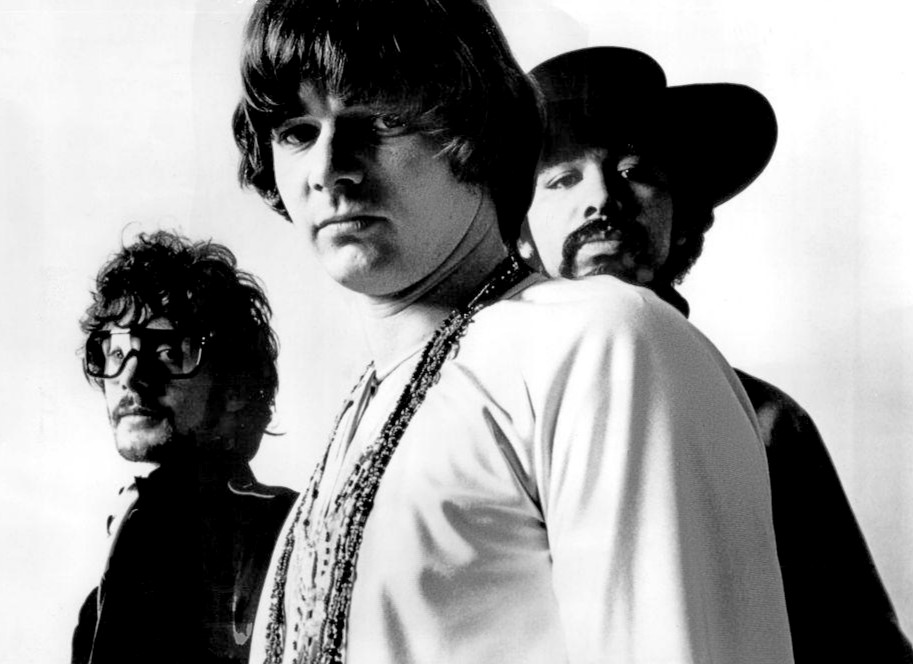
The Steve Miller Band in 1969

In 1965, after moving to Chicago to play the blues, Steve Miller and keyboardist Barry Goldberg founded the Goldberg-Miller Blues Band along with bassist Roy Ruby, rhythm guitarist Craymore Stevens, and drummer Maurice McKinley. The band contracted to Epic Records and recorded a single, "The Mother Song", which they performed on Hullabaloo, before Miller left the group and moved to San Francisco.

In November 1966, Miller formed the Steve Miller Blues Band, consisting of Miller and a trio of Wisconsin transplants: guitarist James "Curley" Cooke, drummer Tim Davis, and bassist Rich Personett; in January 1967, Lonnie Turner replaced Personett, who had been drafted. The band performed regularly in the San Francisco area, and in June they appeared at the Magic Mountain Festival (held June 10/11, 1967). Tim Davis' former college roommate, Jim Peterman, then joined on Hammond B3 organ in time for the band's appearance at the Monterey Pop Festival the following week (the festival was held June 16/17/18, 1967). Later that same month, the group backed Chuck Berry at a gig at the Fillmore Auditorium that was released as the live album, Live at Fillmore Auditorium. In September, guitarist/vocalist Boz Scaggs, who had played in various bands with Steve in the early 1960s in Texas, replaced Curley Cooke, who had taken ill.

In November 1967, the Steve Miller Blues Band signed with Capitol Records. Harvey Kornspan, Miller's lawyer and managing partner, wrote and negotiated the contract ($860,000 over five years as well as $25,000 of promotion money that was to be spent at the band's discretion) with the label's then-president Alan Livingston, who had first approached Miller after seeing the band play at the Monterey Pop Festival in June. Shortly after, the band's name was shortened to the Steve Miller Band at the recommendation of George Martin, in order to broaden its appeal.

In January 1968, the band went to London, England to record their debut album, Children of the Future at Olympic studios, with Glyn Johns as engineer/producer. The album did not score among the Top 100 album chart. The visit itself got off to a poor start also as the group and their entourage were arrested for "importing drugs and possession of a dangerous firearm". Kornspan's wife had called Johns asking whether he would appear as a character witness in the magistrate's court the day after the arrest and, hopefully, stand bail for them. Johns agreed, and the group was released on condition that Johns would "stand surety for their good behavior" for the rest of their time in England. Both accusations were dropped. The "dangerous firearm" turned out to be a non-working flare gun that was being used as a wall decoration in the house where the group was staying. The "imported drugs" happened to be some hash that was buried in the middle of a large fruitcake that had been sent to the group by a stateside friend, unbeknownst to anyone in the group.

The second album Sailor appeared in October 1968 and climbed the Billboard chart to No. 24. Successes included the single "Living in the USA". Brave New World (No. 22, 1969) featured the songs "Space Cowboy" and "My Dark Hour". Paul McCartney, credited as "Paul Ramon", played drums, bass and sang backing vocals on "My Dark Hour". This was followed by Your Saving Grace (No. 38, 1969) and Number 5 (No. 23, 1970). In 1971, Capitol Records released the album Rock Love, featuring unreleased live performances and studio material. This is one of two Steve Miller Band albums not to be reissued on CD until 2022, the other being Recall the Beginning...A Journey from Eden from 1972. Later in 1972, the double album compilation Anthology was released, containing 16 songs from five of the band's first seven albums.

The style and personnel of the band changed radically with The Joker (No. 2, 1973), concentrating on straightforward rock and leaving the psychedelic blues side of the band behind. The title track, "The Joker", became a No. 1 single and was certified 7× platinum, reaching over seven million sales. It was awarded a gold disc by the RIAA on January 11, 1974.

Three years later, the band returned with the album Fly Like an Eagle, which charted at No. 3. Three singles were released from the album: "Take the Money and Run" (No. 11), "Fly Like an Eagle" (No. 2) and their second No. 1 success, "Rock'n Me". Miller credits the guitar introduction to "Rock'n Me" as a tribute to the Free song, "All Right Now".

Book of Dreams (No. 2, 1977) also included three successes: "Jet Airliner" (No. 8), "Jungle Love" (No. 23), and "Swingtown" (No. 17).

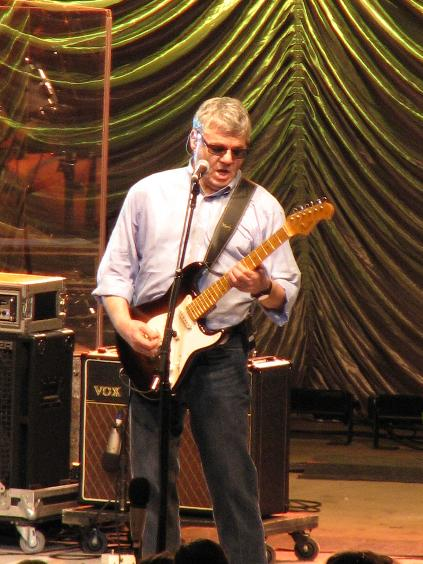
Steve Miller performing at Interlochen Fine Arts Camp on July 20, 2009

Released in 1978, The Steve Miller Band's Greatest Hits 1974–78 has sold over 16 million copies.

1982's Abracadabra album gave Steve Miller his third No. 1 success with the title track. Miller's hit pushed Chicago's "Hard to Say I'm Sorry" out of the No. 1 spot, just as his "Rock'n Me" had knocked Chicago's "If You Leave Me Now" out of the No. 1 spot in 1976.

Bingo!, an album of blues and R&B covers, was released on June 15, 2010. Let Your Hair Down, a companion release to Bingo!, was released 10 months later, on April 18, 2011.

Founding member Tim Davis died from complications due to diabetes on September 20, 1988, at the age of 44. Long-time band member Norton Buffalo died from lung cancer on October 30, 2009. John King (drummer during "The Joker" era) died after a short bout with kidney cancer on October 26, 2010. James Cooke died from cancer on 16 May 2011. Original bassist Lonnie Turner died from lung cancer on April 28, 2013. His time with the band led to songs such as Jet Airliner, Swingtown, Take the Money And Run, Jungle Love and many more. Blues guitarist Jacob Petersen officially joined the band before the Spring 2011 tour. Following Petersen joining the band, longtime guitarist Kenny Lee Lewis switched instruments to become the band's full-time bassist. In 2014, Steve Miller Band toured with fellow San Francisco rock band Journey.

When it was announced that Steve Miller would be inducted into the Rock and Roll Hall of Fame as a solo artist without his band, Miller told Rolling Stone, "It wasn't my decision, and I didn't have any input into any of it. If they had asked me what do, I think I would have said, 'Here's a list of everyone that was ever in my band. They all ought to be here.'"

== Musical style and influences ==
The Steve Miller Band's early material was blues rock that was influenced by psychedelic music. The band played pop rock in their later output. The songwriting has a strong emphasis on melody. Miller experimented with new wave music in the 1980s before reverting back to his initial style with the band.

== Members ==
Current members

- Steve Miller – lead vocals, guitar, harmonica, keyboards (1966–present)
- Kenny Lee Lewis – bass (1983–1987, 2011–present), guitar (1982–1983, 1987–1988, 1994–2011), backing vocals (1982–1988, 1994–present)
- Joseph Wooten – keyboards, backing vocals (1993–present)
- Jacob Petersen – guitar, backing vocals (2011–present)
- Ron Wikso – drums (2021–present)

Former members

- Lonnie Turner – bass, guitar, backing vocals (1966–1970, 1975–1978; died 2013)
- Tim Davis – drums, backing vocals (1966–1970; died 1988)
- Jim Peterman – keyboards, backing vocals (1966–1968)
- Boz Scaggs – guitar, lead and backing vocals (1967–1968)
- James "Curley" Cooke – guitar (1967; died 2011)
- Ben Sidran – keyboards (1969, 1972, 1987–1991; session contributor in 1968, 1970)
- Nicky Hopkins – keyboards (1969, 1970; died 1994)
- Bobby Winkelman – bass, guitar, vocals (1969–1970; died 2023)
- Ross Valory – bass, backing vocals (1970–1971)
- Jack King – drums (1970–1972)
- Gary Mallaber – drums, keyboards, backing vocals (1972, 1975–1987)
- Roger Allen Clark – drums (1972; died 2018)
- Dick Thompson – keyboards (1972–1974)
- Gerald Johnson – bass, backing vocals (1972–1974, 1981–1983)
- John King – drums (1972–1974; died 2010)
- Les Dudek – guitar (1975)
- Doug Clifford – drums (1975)
- David Denny – guitar, backing vocals (1975–1978)
- Norton Buffalo – harmonica, guitar, backing vocals (1975–1978, 1982–1987, 1989–2009; died 2009)
- Greg Douglass – slide guitar, backing vocals (1976–1978)
- Byron Allred – keyboards (1976–1987, 1990; died 2021)
- John Massaro – guitar, backing vocals (1982–1983)
- Billy Peterson – bass, backing vocals (1987–2011)
- Bob Mallach – saxophone (1987–1996)
- Paul Peterson – guitar (1988, 1991–1992)
- Ricky Peterson – keyboards (1988, 1991)
- Keith Allen – guitar, backing vocals (1989–1990)
- Sonny Charles – backing vocals (2008–2011)
- Gordy Knudtson – drums (1987–2021)

== Discography ==
Studio albums

The group has been releasing albums and singles since 1968 and currently has released 18 studio albums, six live albums, seven (official) compilation albums, and at least 29 singles.

- Children of the Future (1968)
- Sailor (1968)
- Brave New World (1969)
- Your Saving Grace (1969)
- Number 5 (1970)
- Rock Love (1971)
- Recall the Beginning...A Journey from Eden (1972)
- The Joker (1973)
- Fly Like an Eagle (1976)
- Book of Dreams (1977)
- Circle of Love (1981)
- Abracadabra (1982)
- Italian X Rays (1984)
- Living in the 20th Century (1986)
- Wide River (1993)
- Bingo! (2010)
- Let Your Hair Down (2011)

== Awards ==
Receiving their Walk of Fame star

- ASCAP Golden Note Award, 2008.
- Star for "Recording" on the Hollywood Walk of Fame on 1750 Vine Street.
- Steve Miller inducted into The Rock and Roll Hall Of Fame in 2016

== See also ==
- List of bands from the San Francisco Bay Area
- Steve Miller Band in Rockpalast 1983
