= Living in the U.S.A. =

Compilation album by The Steve Miller Band
- Released: 1990
- Genre: Rock / Blues
- Label: Capitol
- Producer: Steve Miller, Glyn Johns

The Steve Miller Band chronology
Born 2B Blue (1988)	Living in the U.S.A. (1990)	The Very Best of the Steve Miller Band (1991)

Living in the U.S.A. is a budget compilation package with songs by The Steve Miller Band, assembled by CEMA Special Markets and released in 1990. It features material from the band's 1968-1973 albums, and despite being only a budget release, it has been certified "gold" in the United States. An earlier version with this same title was a 1971 double budget reissue of their second album Sailor along with their first Children of the Future.

== Track listing ==
1. "Living in the U.S.A." (Steve Miller) – 4:05
2. "Space Cowboy" (Miller, Ben Sidran) – 4:57
3. "Don't Let Nobody Turn You Around" (Miller) – 2:29
4. "The Joker" (Miller) – 4:26
5. "Gangster of Love" (Johnny Watson) – 1:25
6. "Lovin' Cup" (Miller) – 2:11
7. "Quicksilver Girl" (Miller) – 2:44
8. "Your Saving Grace" (Tim Davis) – 4:49
9. "Motherless Children" (Trad. arr. Miller) – 4:22
10. "Mary Lou" (Obie Jessie, Sam Ling) – 2:24

== Track listing from Capitol Records Cassette 4XL-57288 ==
1. "The Joker"
2. "Your Saving Grace"
3. "Living in the U.S.A."
4. "Lovin' Cup"
5. "Don't Let Nobody Turn You Around"
6. "Motherless Children"
7. "Gangster of Love"
8. "Space Cowboy"

== Personnel ==
- Steve Miller – guitar, harmonica, vocals
- Boz Scaggs – guitar, vocals on tracks 1, 5 & 7
- Glyn Johns – guitar, percussion, vocals on track 2
- Lonnie Turner – bass guitar, vocals on tracks 1–3, 5, 7–9
- Gerald Johnson – bass guitar, vocals on tracks 4, 6 & 10
- Jim Peterman – keyboards, vocals on tracks 1, 5 & 7
- Ben Sidran – keyboards on tracks 2, 3, 8 & 9
- Dick Thompson – keyboards on tracks 4, 6 & 10
- Tim Davis – drums, vocals on tracks 1–3, 5, 7–9
- John King – drums on tracks 4, 6 & 10

== Certifications ==
Region	Certification	Certified units/sales
United States (RIAA)	Gold	500,000^{^}
^{^} Shipments figures based on certification alone.
