= Steve Miller Band in Rockpalast 1983 =

The Steve Miller Band in Rockpalast 1983 was a televised concert which was broadcast widely in Europe. Despite being a Western European production, it was broadcast also in some countries behind the Iron Curtain, most notably in the Soviet Union.

The performance of the band was actually the final act of the Second Open Air Loreley festival, held on 20 August 1983, at the Freilichtbühne Loreley, an amphitheatre located on top of the Lorelei rock in St. Goarshausen, Germany.

== Background and significance ==
The Steve Miller Band had been touring The United States on the strength of their recent US no. 1 hit "Abracadabra", helping to promote their album of the same name to no. 3 on the US charts. They had played arena concerts with the likes of Heart, Foreigner and The Eagles. When the US dates had all been played, the band gave its only concert of that year in Europe in Loreley.

But not only was this the last concert of the year for Steve Miller, and his only concert in Europe that year, it was the last one for five years, even though he released two more albums with his band (Italian X Rays and Living in the 20th Century) and a solo effort (Born 2 B Blue) in the years following this concert. Only in 1988, after having been invited by Les Paul to appear in his Cinemax show and having seen Pink Floyd and the Beach Boys on successive night, was he convinced that he still had something to offer and put together a band and started annual tours again.

== The festival ==
The acts of the concert were:

- Dave Edmunds
- U2
- Stray Cats
- Joe Cocker
- Steve Miller Band

== The televised concert ==
The performance of the Steve Miller Band was televised during the following winter to the following countries, with greetings addressed to audiences in these countries in the following words:

- West Germany and East Germany in German: “Hi, deutsche Fans, willkommen und viel Spaß, bei unsere Schau, auch für unsere Freunde im Osten.” (‘Hi German fans, welcome and enjoy the show, likewise to our friends in the east’)
- The Soviet Union in Russian: “Привет всем нашем друзям в Советском Союзе.” (‘Greetings to all our friends in the Soviet Union.’)
- Italy in Italian: “Benvenuti a nostro spettacolo. (‘Welcome to our show.’)
- Hungary in Hungarian: "Helló, magyarok! Reméljük, szeretik ezt a műszort!" (‘Hello Hungarians! We hope you’ll like the show.’)
- Switzerland in German: “Grüezi, Fans in der Schweitz.” (‘Hello, fans in Switzerland’).
- Finland in Finnish: "Hei Suomi, ja tervetuloa konserttiin." (‘Hi Finland and welcome to the concert.’)
- France in French: “Bonjour la France, bienvenu à nôtre spectacle.” (‘Hello France, and welcome to our show.’)
- Denmark in Danish: "Hilse Danmark og hjertelig velkommen." (‘Greetings Denmark and a warm welcome.’)
- Austria in German: “Hallo Österreich!” (‘Hello Austria.’)
- Sweden in Swedish: "Och till våra svenska vänner, hjärtlig välkomna till vår show." (‘And to our Swedish friends, a warm welcome to our show.’)
- Portugal in Portuguese: "Boa noite, Portugal. Bem-vindos ao nosso espetáculo." (‘Good evening Portugal. Welcome to our show.’)

The concert by the Steve Miller Band was a bit of American show biz and Las Vegas at the Loreley. Miller had decided that the only concert in Europe would be a spectacular event, so two tigers appeared on the stage together with a magician who was brought in from America.

The concert can be found in YouTube in eleven parts. (See the links on the table below.)

== The line-up of the band ==
The line-up of the band was essentially the same as on the Abracadabra album, with the addition of Norton Buffalo on the harmonica.

- Steve Miller – vocals, guitar, harmonica
- John Massaro – guitar
- Kenny Lee Lewis – guitar
- Norton Buffalo – harmonica
- Byron Allred – keyboards
- Gerald Johnson – bass guitar
- Gary Mallaber – drums

== Setlist ==
The setlist contained songs released since 1968, along with some that were released on subsequent albums (in italics) and some that apparently were penned by Miller but never released, (likewise in italics). The unreleased songs include "Honey Hush" and "Somebody Done Hoo Dood The Hoo Doo Man", the latter of which is not the Wesley Wilson song, made popular by the 1940 version of Louis Jordan. (The lyrics begin as follows: “I’m tired of being cool, I wanna get hot…”) One very rare piece in this concert was the song "Macho City", a live recording of which probably can not be found anywhere else.

Steve Miller himself appears to have posted a video of the concert on YouTube, and despite it being described as a "full concert", it leaves out seven songs from the end and renders "Macho City" incomplete.

Setlist
Track	Song	Length	Start at	Writer(s)	Album	Year
1	Swingtown/Guitar solo (Magic Introduction)	1'48"	0:00:00	S. Miller/McCarty	Book of Dreams	1982/—
2	Abracadabra	4'14"	0:01:28	S. Miller	Abracadabra	1982
–	Multillingual Welcome		0:06:54			
3	The Joker	2'57"	0:07:47	Miller/Curtis/Ertegün	The Joker	1973
4	You You You	2'38"	0:10:54	S. Miller/Davis	Italian X Rays	1984
5	Out of the Night	4'17"	0:13:54	S. Miller/Davis	Italian X Rays	1984
6	Living in the USA	5'34"	0:18:31	S. Miller	Sailor	1968
7	Somebody Done Hoo Dood The Hoo Doo Man	2'59"	0:23:20		unreleased	
8	Just A Little Bit	2'32"	0:26:21	Gordon/McCracklin	Let Your Hair Down	2011
9	Buffalo's Serenade	5'55"	0:29:27	Buffalo	unreleased	
10	Fly Like An Eagle	3'11"	0:35:30	S. Miller	Fly Like an Eagle	1976
11	Keeps Me Wondering Why	4'17"	0:38:46	Mallaber/Lewis	Abracadabra	1982
12	Rock’n Me	5'17"	0:43:16	S. Miller	Fly Like an Eagle	1976
13	Jungle Love	3'37"	0:49:07	S. Miller	Book of Dreams	1977
14	Jet Airliner	4'36"	0:53:24	Pena	Book of Dreams	1977
15	Macho City	7'28"	0:58:57	S. Miller	Circle of Love	1981
16	Honey Hush	4'26"	Video		unreleased	
17	My Babe	3'21"	"	Dixon	Living in the 20th Century	1986
18	You Know What I Mean	6'06"	Video		unreleased	
19	Yonder's Wall	3'05"	"	James/Sehorn	Let Your Hair Down	2011
20	Yonder's Wall reprise	1'43"	Video	James/Sehorn	Let Your Hair Down	2011
21	Space Cowboy	2'50"	"	S. Miller	Brave New World	1969
22	Abracadabra	4'17"	"	S. Miller	Abracadabra	1982
