= Don't Cry For No Hipster =

2013 jazz album by Ben Sidran

Studio album by Ben Sidran
- Released: 2013
- Recorded: July 23–25, 2012
- Venue: The Bunker, Brooklyn
- Studio: Sterling Sound
- Genre: Jazz; Jazz-funk
- Length: 54:14
- Label: Nardis Records in the US; Bonsaï Music in France
- Producer: Leo Sidran

Ben Sidran chronology
Dylan Different (2009)	Don't Cry For No Hipster (2013)

Don't Cry For No Hipster is a jazz album by keyboardist and vocalist Ben Sidran. It was recorded in July 2012, and released in 2013 under Sidran's label Nardis Records in the United States, and Bonsaï Music in France.

It was Sidran's 35th studio album, and his first with original tracks since his 2008 album Cien Noches (One Hundred Nights at the Cafe).

== Background ==
The album is a retrospective for Sidran, and a commentary on hipster culture. The liner notes summarise Sidran's view that "[a]nybody who self-identifies as a hipster is, by definition, not one". The eponymous track laments what hipster culture had become by the early 2010s. Sidran describes that the "hipster is an image that goes back all the way to Prohibition" and that "Hipsters were basically people who dug jazz, dug the nightlife, and I consider myself one of them."

The tracks include a mix of jazz, funk, blues, and rock influences. They cover topics from golf (in the "Back Nine") to religion (in "In The Beginning") delivered with subtle irony and a range of different instrumentation. "Private Guy" recalls his efforts writing his 2004 album Nick's Bump and his aversion to publicity.

Twelve of the tracks were newly-written for the album, with four co-written with Sidran's son Leo. Leo produced the album, and makes another appearance as drummer. It also contains an instrumental cover of "Reflections" by Thelonious Monk, and a rendition of Merle Travis's "Sixteen Tons" made famous by Tennessee Ernie Ford.

== Reception ==
Professional ratings
Review scores
Source	Rating
AllAboutJazz	4/5 stars

Luca Muchetti rated the album four stars for AllAboutJazz, commenting Sidran had "style" (translated).

Christopher Loudon summarised the album for the JazzTimes as a "collection of funny, wry and occasionally even spiritual musings" and that it was his "hippest" since his 2009 tribute album to Bob Dylan. He reviewed the covers as "gorgeous" and "finger snapping".

George Graham commented on WVIA-FM the album was "clever" and "another enjoyable recording from a prolific musician" whose "songs are both lyrically clever and intelligent as musical compositions". On Sidran's familiarity, he concluded it "could be a good vehicle for larger audiences to get to know this versatile artist."

Former USA Today writer Nick DeRiso praised the range of musical genres on the album, commenting Sidran rendered them "effortlessly".

Robin wrote for the South China Morning Post that the album was "delivered in a style full of wit and polish".

== Track listing ==
All tracks are written by Ben Sidran, unless otherwise stated.

No.	Title	Writer(s)	Length
1.	"Back Nine"	Ben Sidran, Leo Sidran	4:31
2.	"Brand New Music"		3:26
3.	"Don't Cry for No Hipster"		4:57
4.	"As Least We Got to the Race"		3:02
5.	"Can We Talk"	Ben Sidran, Leo Sidran	5:29
6.	"In The Beginning"		2:32
7.	"It Don't Get No Better"	Ben Sidran, Leo Sidran	3:39
8.	"Dying Anyway"		4:15
9.	"Private Guy"		4:01
10.	"Reflections"	Theloneous Monk	4:23
11.	"Take a Little Hit"		2:57
12.	"Sixteen Tons"	Merle Travis	3:35
13.	"Rich Interior Life"	Ben Sidran, Leo Sidran	2:45
14.	"Hooglin'"		4:42
Total length:			54:14

== Personnel ==
=== Musicians ===
- Ben Sidran – Vocals, piano, electric piano (Wurlitzer), Hammond organ
- Leo Sidran – Drums
- Tim Luntzel – Bass
- Orlando le Fleming – Bass
- Will Bernard – Guitar
- John Ellis – Saxophone
- Mark Shim – Saxophone
- Moses Patrou – Percussion
- Trixie Waterbed – Backing vocals

=== Support ===
- Leo Sidran – Producer
- UE Nastasi – Mastering
- Hector Condon – Mixing
- Jordan Makow – Photography
- Aaron Nevezie – Recording
