= The Concert for García Lorca =

Live album by Ben Sidran
- Released: 1999
- Recorded: June 18, 1998; Huerta de San Vicente in Granada, Spain.
- Genre: Jazz
- Length: 65:50
- Label: Go Jazz go 6033

Ben Sidran chronology
Live at Celebrity Lounge (1998)	The Concert for García Lorca (1999)	Walk Pretty: The Music of Alec Wilder (2002)

The Concert for García Lorca is an album by pianist Ben Sidran featuring performances recorded in 1998 at the home of Federico García Lorca using his piano on the 100th anniversary of his birth and released on the Go Jazz label.

== Reception ==
Professional ratings
Review scores
Source	Rating
Allmusic	4/5 stars

The Allmusic review states "This is not only a fitting tribute to Federico García Lorca, but it is also a shining, truly original portrait of a very literate jazzman who has plenty of tricks and wonders up his sleeve, more than three decades after he began. Highly recommended if you can find it".

== Track listing ==
All compositions by Ben Sidran featuring text by Federico García Lorca except as indicated

1. "On Defeating Death/Absent Soul" – 11:37
2. "It Ain't Necessarily So" (George Gershwin, Ira Gershwin) – 5:02
3. "On Duende" – 10:30
4. "Cante Jondo and the Blues" – 11:49
5. "New Gypsy Ballads: Whisper Not/Lover Man" (Benny Golson/Jimmy Davis, Ram Ramirez, James Sherman) – 6:18
6. "Look Here" (Mose Allison) – 3:34
7. "Poet in New York/Freedom Jazz Dance" (García Lorca, Sidran/Eddie Harris) – 8:37
8. "For Margarita Xirgu" – 8:29

== Personnel ==
- Ben Sidran – piano, vocals
- Bobby Martínez – tenor saxophone
- Manuel Calleja – bass
- Leo Sidran – drums
