= Bohemia (disambiguation) =

Bohemia is a region making up the western two-thirds of the contemporary Czech Republic.

Bohemia may also refer to:

== Historical countries ==
- Kingdom of Bohemia (1198–1918), a medieval and early modern monarchy in Central Europe
- Lands of the Bohemian Crown (1348–1918), a monarchy comprising all historical Czech lands
- Duchy of Bohemia (c.870–1198), a predecessor of Kingdom of Bohemia
- Protectorate of Bohemia and Moravia (1939–1945), an entity established by Nazi Germany in occupied parts of Czechoslovakia

== Places ==
=== England ===
- Bohemia, Hastings, a suburb and electoral ward of Hastings, East Sussex
- Bohemia, Wiltshire

=== United States ===
- Bohemia, Louisiana, a historical town in Plaquemines Parish
- Bohemia, New York, a hamlet in Suffolk County
- Bohemia Mountain, a mountain in Oregon
- Bohemia River, a tributary of the Elk River in Maryland and Delaware
- Bohemia Township (disambiguation), a list of places
- Mount Bohemia, a mountain in Michigan

== Music ==
- Bohemia (rapper) (born 1979), Pakistani-American Punjabi rapper
- Bohemia (Ils album), an album released by Ils in 2005 on Distinct'ive Records
- Bohemia (Leo Sidran album), 2004
- "Bohemia", a 1919 ragtime composition by Joseph Lamb
- Bohemia Suburbana, a Guatemalan rock band

== Beer ==
- A beer by the Cuauhtémoc Moctezuma Brewery, a subsidiary of Heineken International
- A Brazilian brewery founded in 1853 and currently owned by Anheuser-Busch InBev
- National Bohemian, a brand of beer originally brewed in Baltimore, Maryland, now owned by the Pabst Brewing Company
- Bohemian style beer, created in 1842 in Pilsner, Bohemia

== Other ==
- Bohemia (newspaper), the title of newspapers in Prague
- SS Bohemia, a Hamburg Amerika Linie steamship
- Bohemianism, a cultural movement of wanderers, adventurers, or vagabonds
- Bohemia Interactive Studio, a software company
- Acacia cuspidifolia, a tree called "bohemia"

== See also ==
- Bohemian (disambiguation)
