= Nick's Bump =

Studio album by Ben Sidran
- Released: 17 Feb 2004
- Recorded: 28 – 29 Jun 2003
- Genre: Smooth jazz
- Length: 44:07
- Language: English
- Label: Nardis
- Producer: Ben Sidran

Nick's Bump is a smooth jazz album by American keyboardist and jazz vocalist Ben Sidran, released in 2004. It is Sidran's twenty sixth album, and his first release by his independent label Nardis Records.

== Background ==
Although Sidran's reputation as a keyboardist had been well established by the time it was released, Nick's Bump represented his first effort at an instrumental album. The tracks are presented as a "party mix" of cool tunes to be accompanied by a "Nick's Bump" drink, the recipe for which is included in the CD notes.

The album's songs were composed by a litany of jazz artists, notably Eddie Harris who is represented in three songs including "Listen Here", the first single track from the 1967 second place R&B chart topper The Electrifying Eddie Harris.

In a style that would later be echoed by such works as Dylan Different, the album was recorded live without alterations.

== Track listing ==
The album is an Enhanced CD, as such it contains a mix of CD audio and computer video files.

=== Audio tracks ===
No.	Title	Writer(s)	Length
1.	"Little Sherry"	Charlie Rouse, Ben Sidran	3:30
2.	"Cryin' Blues"	Eddie Harris	4:36
3.	"Black Jack"	Donald Byrd	7:12
4.	"Blue Parther"	Sidran	5:02
5.	"The Cats"	Sidran	0:20
6.	"Zambia"	Lee Morgan	6:00
7.	"Mean Greens"	Harris	5:08
8.	"Listen Here"	Harris	5:51
9.	"Blue Minor"	Sonny Clark	6:28
10.	"Nicks's Bump"	Bob Rockwell	4:05

=== Computer videos ===
- The How and Why of Nick's Bump, video interview
- You Can't Judge a Book (A Great Rhythm Section)

== Personnel ==
- Ben Sidran – Hammond organ, Wurlitzer electric piano
- Louka Patenaude – guitar
- Billy Peterson – bass
- Bob Rockwell – tenor saxophone, flute
- Leo Sidran – drums, percussion
- Mark Haines – engineer

== Reception ==
Professional ratings
Review scores
Source	Rating
AllMusic	3/5 stars

Writing for AllMusic, Alex Henderson comments that the musical style "unfortunately, didn't restore the mass appeal that jazz enjoyed during the Great Depression and World War II", but concedes "it was a noble effort".

With reference to Sidran's previous work, Henderson concludes that the album "falls short of essential but is still an infectious, enjoyably funky demonstration of what he can do in an instrumental setting."
