= How to Win! =

Live album by Maria Bamford
- Released: February 20, 2007
- Recorded: November 15–19, 2005
- Genre: Comedy
- Length: 49:43
- Label: Stand Up!
- Producer: Dan Schlissel

Maria Bamford chronology
The Burning Bridges Tour (2003)	How to Win! (2007)	Unwanted Thoughts Syndrome (2009)

Professional ratings
Review scores
Source	Rating
Allmusic	3.5/5 stars

How to Win! is Maria Bamford's second comedy album, following The Burning Bridges Tour. It was recorded at Cap City Comedy Club in Austin, Texas, on November 15–19, 2005.

== Critical reception ==
Stewart Mason of AllMusic found the album an improvement over her debut record, noting that Bamford seemed to be relying less on a cartoony persona and called her material both "amusingly dark" and "less insular" than previously, "focusing on more social and political topics."

== Track listing ==
1. "Opening Party" – 2:15
2. "I Heart My Country" – 3:06
3. "Mental Makeup" – 2:15
4. "Competitive Living" – 2:22
5. "Giant Corporation" – 3:38
6. "Self Employed" – 3:12
7. "Saddest Place in the World" – 1:52
8. "Your Comedy Club" – 1:51
9. "Fun Being Evil" – 2:28
10. "Life in LA" – 2:39
11. "TV" – 2:33
12. "Super Confident People" – 1:51
13. "The-Rapist" – 1:15
14. "Alicia Keys" – 2:42
15. "Credit Test" – 2:11
16. "Depression" – 2:14
17. "Dale Carnegie" – 2:01
18. "Dad" – 3:18
19. "Sister Sarah" – 3:02
20. "Arch Enemy from High School" – 1:31
21. "Aging" – 1:25

== Personnel ==
- Maria Bamford – performer
- Britt Lundquist – photography
- John Machnik – engineering, mastering, photography
- Ian Rans – design
- Dan Schlissel – production, editing
