= Jewish Music Festival =

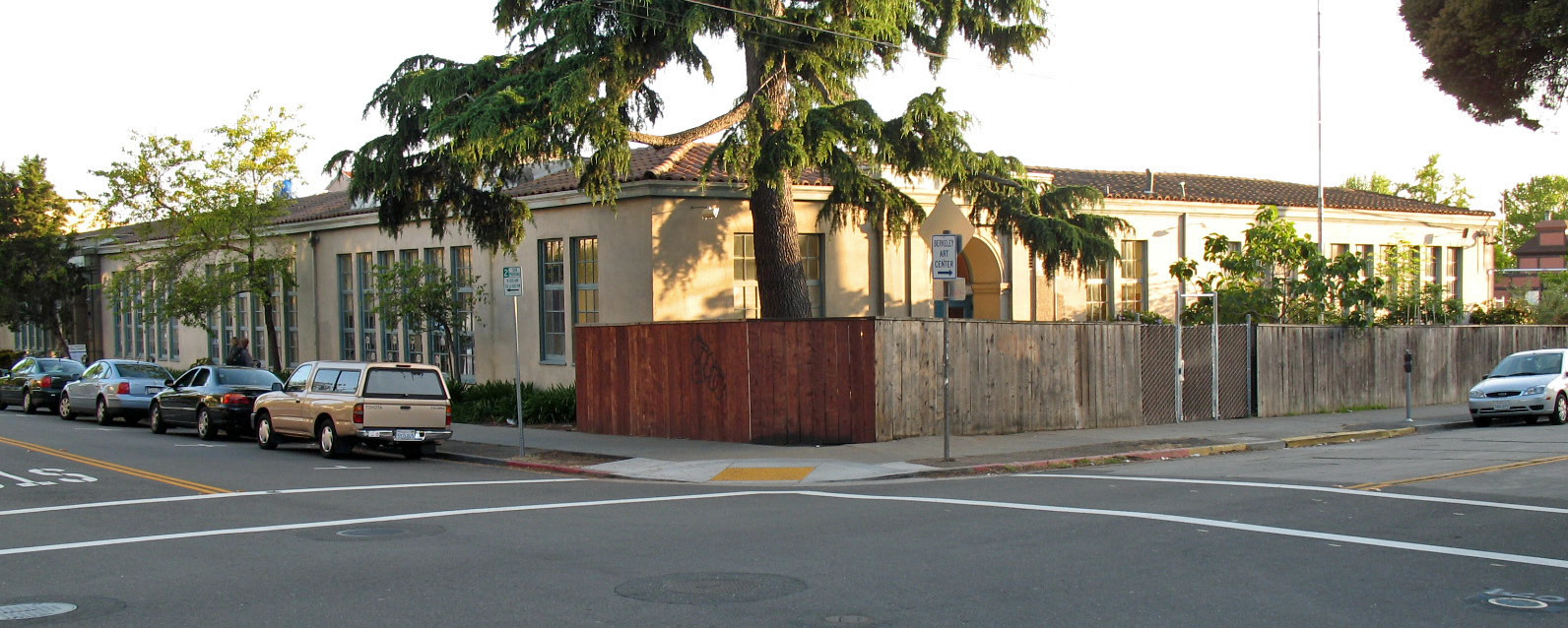
The Jewish Community Center of Berkeley

The Jewish Music Festival, established in 1994, is an annual festival of Jewish music held in Berkeley, California, hosted by the Jewish Community Center of the East Bay. It has been held for 32 years. Notable guests have included Ben Sidran in 2014, among others.

There was no festival in 2020.
