= Joy and the Boy =

American musical duo

Joy and the Boy is an American musical duo consisting of singer-songwriter Joy Dragland and musician/producer Leo Sidran (son of Ben Sidran). Their first performance as a duo was in Madison, Wisconsin at a 2000 political rally at the Wisconsin State Capitol in front of 30,000 people. They released the album Paradise on Nardis Records in 2004 and its cover version of Marvin Gaye's "Let's Get It On" debuted in the Top 40 pop radio charts in Spain.

== Discography ==
- Paradise (Nardis Records) (2004)
