= The Burning Bridges Tour =

Live album by Maria Bamford
- Released: December 1, 2003
- Recorded: October 25–26, 2002
- Venue: Acme Comedy Club, Minneapolis
- Genre: Comedy
- Length: 42:45
- Label: Stand Up!
- Producer: Dan Schlissel

Maria Bamford chronology
The Burning Bridges Tour (2003)	How to WIN! (2007)

The Burning Bridges Tour is the debut album from comedian Maria Bamford. It was recorded at Acme Comedy Club in Minneapolis, Minnesota from October 25–26, 2002.

== Critical reception ==
Jenny Nelson of Vulture called the album an early example of Bamford's "honesty and unique creativity. ... It’s nice to hear her coming into her own unconventional style in her earlier material."

== Track listing ==
1. "My Mother Always Told Me" – 1:44
2. "Goddess of Little Lake Pequaym" – 2:26
3. "32AA" – 2:42
4. "Hollywood Standards" – 0:47
5. "Small Talk" – 4:26
6. "Miss the Excitement" – 3:31
7. ""We Do Things a Little Differently Around Here"" – 2:17
8. "Crazy Cult" – 2:34
9. "Sexual Harassment" – 2:10
10. "Lady Boss" – 0:54
11. "Vennette" – 2:07
12. "Plan B" – 1:42
13. "Too Much TV" – 0:56
14. "Celebrity Homes" – 1:25
15. "Mom's Religion" – 1:17
16. "Touched by an Angel" – 2:49
17. "LA People" – 1:10
18. "Ritz Carlton Jesus" – 1:58
19. "Ventriloquist Prayer" – 1:31
20. "Voicemail Non Sequiturs" – 1:56
21. "Pterodactyl Song" – 1:01

== Personnel ==
- Maria Bamford – performer
- John Machnik – mastering, mixing
- Susan Maljan – photography
- Dan Schlissel – production, engineering, editing
