= Your Saving Grace =

Studio album by Steve Miller Band
- Released: November 1969
- Recorded: 1969
- Studios: Wally Heider, San Francisco, California
- Genres: Psychedelic rock; blues rock
- Length: 37:31
- Label: Capitol
- Producer: Glyn Johns

Steve Miller Band chronology
Brave New World (1969)	Your Saving Grace (1969)	Number 5 (1970)

Your Saving Grace is the fourth album by American rock group the Steve Miller Band, released in November 1969. It reached number 38 on the Billboard Top LPs chart.

Professional ratings
Review scores
Source	Rating
AllMusic	3/5 stars
Rolling Stone	(favorable)
Encyclopedia of Popular Music	3/5 stars

== Track listing ==
Side One
No.	Title	Writer(s)	Length
1.	"Little Girl"	Steve Miller	3:20
2.	"Just a Passin' Fancy in a Midnite Dream"	Miller; Ben Sidran	3:38
3.	"Don't Let Nobody Turn You Around"	Miller	2:27
4.	"Baby's House"	Miller; Nicky Hopkins	8:55

Side Two
No.	Title	Writer(s)	Length
5.	"Motherless Children"	traditional; arr. Miller	5:52
6.	"The Last Wombat in Mecca"	Lonnie Turner	2:53
7.	"Feel So Glad"	Miller	5:22
8.	"Your Saving Grace"	Tim Davis	4:55
Total length:			37:31

== Personnel ==
=== Steve Miller Band ===
- Steve Miller — lead vocals (tracks 1–5, 7), guitar (track 1–5, 7), guitar solo (tracks 3, 5), electronics (track 5)
- Lonnie Turner — bass; co-lead vocals (track 3), slide guitar (track 6)
- Tim Davis — drums; co-lead vocals (track 3), electronics (track 5), lead vocals (tracks 6, 8), percussion (track 8)

=== Additional personnel ===
- Glyn Johns — tambourine (track 1), co-lead vocals (track 3), guitar (tracks 5, 8), electronics (track 5), backing vocals (track 8)
- Nicky Hopkins — piano (tracks 2, 4, 7), organ (tracks 4, 8), harpsichord (track 5)
- Ben Sidran — organ (track 2)
- "Ronnie" — co-lead vocals (track 3)
- Barnes Ensemble — vocal chorus (track 4)
- Minor Wilson — guitar (track 6)
- Curley Cooke — guitar (track 8)
