= John Machnik =

American record producer

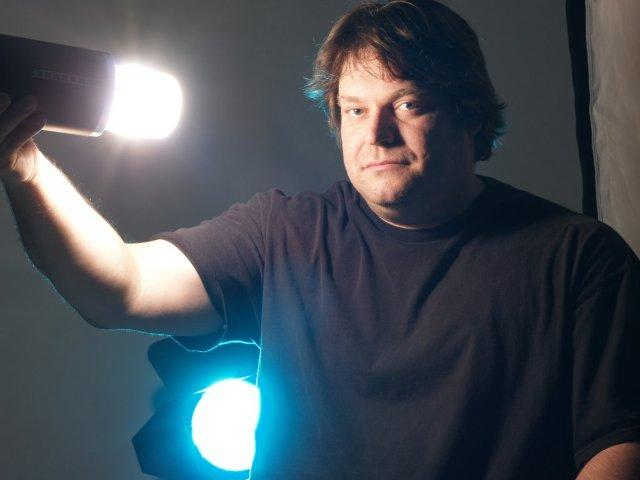

Background information
- Born: John Fredrick Machnik; February 14, 1968 (age 58); Arlington Heights, Illinois, U.S.
- Genres: Rock, heavy metal, punk rock, blues, world music
- Occupations: Record producer, electrical engineer
- Years active: 1991–present
- Labels: Stand Up!, Comedy Central, Rhetoric
- Website: electro-works.com

John F. Machnik (born February 14, 1968) is an American record producer and recording engineer from Madison, Wisconsin. He was the owner of Sleepless Nights Recording Studios from 1989 to 2001.

== Biography ==
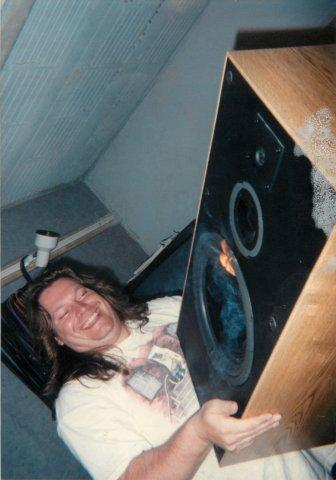
Machnik carrying a speaker out of the studio that caught fire while recording a guitar solo for the heavy metal band Anshar

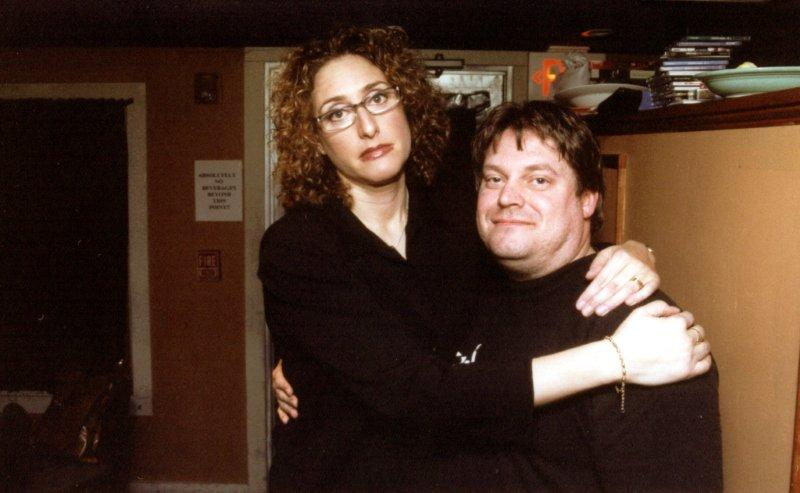
Judy Gold and John Machnik in 2004

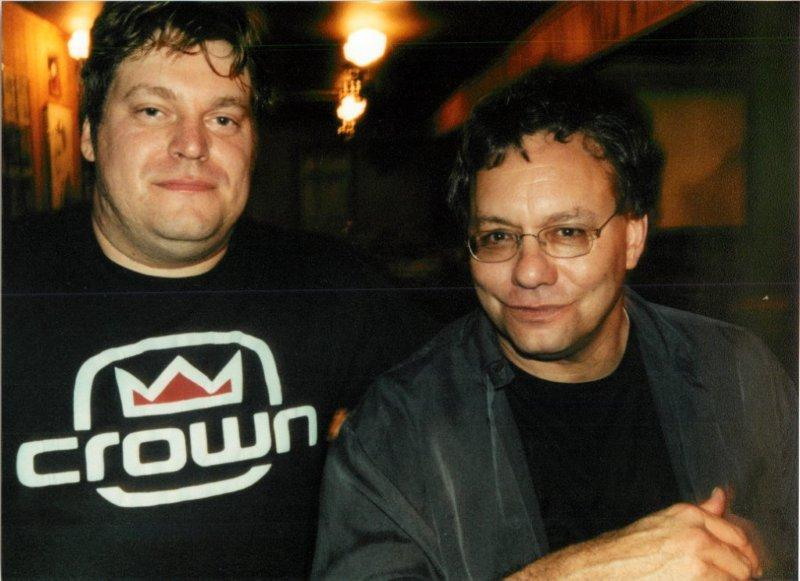
Lewis Black and John Machnik in Atlanta, GA

Resonance (Tesla) Coil that John help build while employed at Resonance Research, Baraboo, WI

In 2000, he started recording comedy for Stand Up! Records, including Mitch Hedberg, Lewis Black "White Album", Lewis Black "Revolver", Lewis Black "End of the Universe", Ron White, Dave Attell, Doug Stanhope, Sklar Brothers, David Cross, Maria Bamford, Judy Gold, Marc Maron, Greg Proops, Dan Naturman, Tom Rhodes, Tim Slagle, Matt Kirshen, Rene Hicks, Jamie Kilstein, Hannibal Buress and Andy Andrist.

In 2004, John recorded the Madison stint of the David Cross's "Shut Up, You Fucking Baby!" tour. Initially, it was thought that none of the material was used on the album but later found out from producer Scotty Crane that bits were indeed used on the album. The album was nominated for a Grammy for Best Comedy Album in 2004.

In 2008, John received a Grammy award for his work on the Lewis Black album "Anticipation". and was nominated in 2006 for work on Lewis Black's album Luther Burbank Performing Arts Center Blues.

John has done engineering, producing and/or mastering for the following: Cold, Less Than Jake, Unsane, Space Streakings, Ed Hall, Merl Saunders, Killdozer, Bongzilla, Horace Pinker, Still Life, Ceilishrine, Crayon Black, None Left Standing, The Promise Ring, The Heavils, Mount Shasta, Madisalsa, White, Marques Bovre and the Evil Twins, Road Trip, Sunshine Allison, Corm, Discount, Peepshow, Middle World, Pachinko, Driving with Carl, Saving Face, Genetic Drift, Mad Trucker, Phat Phunktion, Muzzy Luctin, Angels or Insects, Howl, Wish, Magic 7, and Last Crack plus many midwest local acts.

John is now President of Electro-Works, Inc., a Wisconsin-based company providing custom sound, lighting, audio and video applications. Electro-Works, Inc. has been involved in projects across the United States and parts of Asia.
