= Don't Let Go (Ben Sidran album) =

Studio album by Ben Sidran
- Released: 1974
- Recorded: 1974; Madison, Chicago and Los Angeles
- Genre: Jazz, jazz-funk
- Length: 37:20
- Label: Blue Thumb; BTS 6012
- Producer: Bulldog Productions Inc.

Ben Sidran chronology
Puttin' In Time on Planet Earth (1973)	Don't Let Go (1974)	Free in America (1976)

Don't Let Go is an album by pianist Ben Sidran featuring performances recorded in 1974 and released on the Blue Thumb label.

== Reception ==
Professional ratings
Review scores
Source	Rating
AllMusic	4/5 stars

The AllMusic review states "This is a killer, adventurous record from a magical time that doesn't sound a bit dated in the 21st century".

== Track listing ==
All compositions by Ben Sidran except as indicated

1. "Fat Jam" (James P. Cooke) – 3:25
2. "House of Blue Lites" (Don Raye, Freddie Slack) – 3:13
3. "Ben Sidran's Midnite Tango" – 2:40
4. "The Chicken Glide" – 3:45
5. "She's Funny That Way (I Got a Woman, Crazy for Me)" (Neil Moret, Richard Whiting) – 3:36
6. "Monopoly" (Bud Powell) – 1:31
7. "Don't Let Go" – 3:18
8. "Hey Hey Baby" (James P. Cooke) – 3:31
9. "The Foolkiller" (Mose Allison) – 3:44
10. "The Funky Elephant" (Ben Sidran, James P. Cooke, Kip Merklein, Clyde Stubblefield) – 3:30
11. "Snatch" – 3:51
12. "Down to the Bone" – 1:16

== Personnel ==
- Ben Sidran – piano, vocals
- Bunky Green – alto saxophone
- Sonny Seals – tenor saxophone
- Jerry Alexander – harmonica
- Jim Peterman – organ
- James P. Cooke – guitar
- Phil Upchurch – guitar, bass, drums, percussion
- Randy Fullerton, Kip Merklein (track 10) – bass
- Clyde Stubblefield, George Brown – drums, percussion
- Tom Piazza – drums (track 8)
- Sonny Burke – horn arrangement
- Unidentified string section arranged by Les Hooper
