= Phat Phunktion =

American funk band

- Origin: Madison, Wisconsin, United States
- Genres: Funk, R&B, Jazz, Rock, Hip-hop
- Years active: 1996 – present
- Labels: Nardis Records/Liquid 8; Groovetime
- Members: Tim Whalen; Al Falaschi; Courtney Larsen; Jon Schipper; Pauli Ryan; Darvonte Murray; Nick Moran; Vince Jesse; Jim Doherty
- Past members: Sheldon Allen; Steve Styles; Jason Braatz; Travis Andrews; Kevin Klemme; Rob Szudy; Dan Wallach; Jeff Maddern; Mike Boman
- Website: phatphunktion.com

Phat Phunktion is a nine-piece American funk band founded in 1996 by students at the University of Wisconsin–Madison. Tim Whalen and Al Falaschi started the band for a battle of the bands competition. They have recorded four studio albums and a live album and Blu-ray disc, and are noted for a horn-driven sound that draws inspiration from funk bands of the 1970s. Whalen and Falaschi are the primary songwriters.

== Origin ==
In April 1996, music students Tim Whalen and Al Falaschi gathered a group of jazz band students at the University of Wisconsin-Madison and formed Phat Phunktion to enter a battle of the bands competition at the student union. It was meant to be a one-off gig, but the band kept going. They released their self-titled, eponymous debut album in 1997.

== Career ==
The band toured throughout the Midwest during the late 1990s and early 2000s, releasing two more studio albums. The first, Here We Go, came out in 1999, followed in 2004 by You and Me, which was released on Nardis Records. In the meantime, they had begun to attract national and international notice. In 2001, they won the Wisconsin Area Music Industry (WAMI) award for best R&B band. In 2003, Rolling Stone singled them out as a "band on the rise" and Billboard judges selected them to perform at the Disc Makers Independent Music World Series Midwest regional final in Chicago, where they took top honors along with Chicago's Orbert Davis.

The band embarked on its first US tour from June 2005 to August 2006, playing festivals, including the Bele Chere Music Festival, the Riverbend Festival, Riverfest, and the Art Tatum Jazz and Heritage Festival, as well as premiere venues such as The Knitting Factory and BB Kings in New York City.

Meanwhile, You and Me was re-released in Japan on the Groovetime Records label. The band then released a compilation album called Soul Juice with songs from the first two albums, and they toured Japan in February 2006. Local press called them "the new Tower of Power."

The band then took some time off while Falaschi's wife Kate battled cancer. After her death in 2009, Whalen and Falaschi began writing again, and the band released Real Life.:.High Fidelity in 2011, leading to another tour of Japan in April 2012.

The band celebrated their 20th anniversary on 7 October 2016 at the High Noon Saloon in Madison, Wisconsin. The audio and video from that show was released as a live CD and Blu-ray disc set called Phat Phunktion: Live at the High Noon on 2 June 2017. In the lead-up to the release, the video for the track "Knockin' Em Down" premiered at Vents Magazine on 22 May, and Relix premiered the video for "Don't Destroy the Funk" on 31 May.

== Individual achievements ==
Co-founder and saxophonist Falaschi arranged and composed music for Clyde Stubblefield's 2003 album, The Original, and appeared as a member of the "Sad Sax" collective on Bon Iver's 22, A Million. Whalen also contributed to The Original, and orchestrated strings for Jorge Drexler's Oscar-winning song "Al otro lado del río."

== Charity work ==
Since 2009 the band has staged "Funk Out Cancer" fundraising concerts in Madison every other year. As of 2017 they had raised nearly $200,000 in research funds for the University of Wisconsin Carbone Cancer Center.

== Awards ==
- 2001 - WAMI for Best R&B Group
- 2005 - MAMA (Madison Area Music Award) for Best R&B Album - “You and Me”
- 2012 - MAMA (Madison Area Music Awards) for Best Pop/R&B Album (Real Life.:.High Fidelity), and Best Pop/R&B Performer
- 2018 - WAMI for Best Reeds/Brass Player (Al Falaschi)
- 2018 - MAMA (Madison Area Music Award) for Woodwinds/Sax (Al Falaschi) and Keyboards/Synthesizers (Tim Whalen)
- 2019 - MAMA (Madison Area Music Awards) for Woodwinds/Sax (Al Falaschi) and Trombone (Courtney Larsen)
- 2020 - MAMA (Madison Area Music Awards) for Best Trombonist (Courtney Larsen) and percussionist (Pauli Ryan)

== Discography ==
Album	Year	Label
PhatPhunktion	1997	
Here We Go	1999	
You and Me	2004	Nardis Records/Liquid 8, Groovetime Records
Soul Juice	2005	Groovetime Records
Real Life.:.High Fidelity	2011	Nardis Records/Liquid 8
Phat Phunktion: Live at the High Noon	2017	
