= On the Cool Side =

Studio album by Ben Sidran
- Released: 1985 (LP); 1996 (CD)
- Genre: Jazz; Smooth jazz Jazz fusion
- Length: 48:32
- Language: English
- Label: Windham Hill
- Producer: Ben Sidran

Ben Sidran chronology
Live at the Elvehjem (1985)	On the Cool Side (1985)	On the Live Side (1986)

On the Cool Side is a smooth jazz album by keyboardist and jazz vocalist Ben Sidran. Released in 1985, it was Sidran's fourteenth studio album.

== Background ==
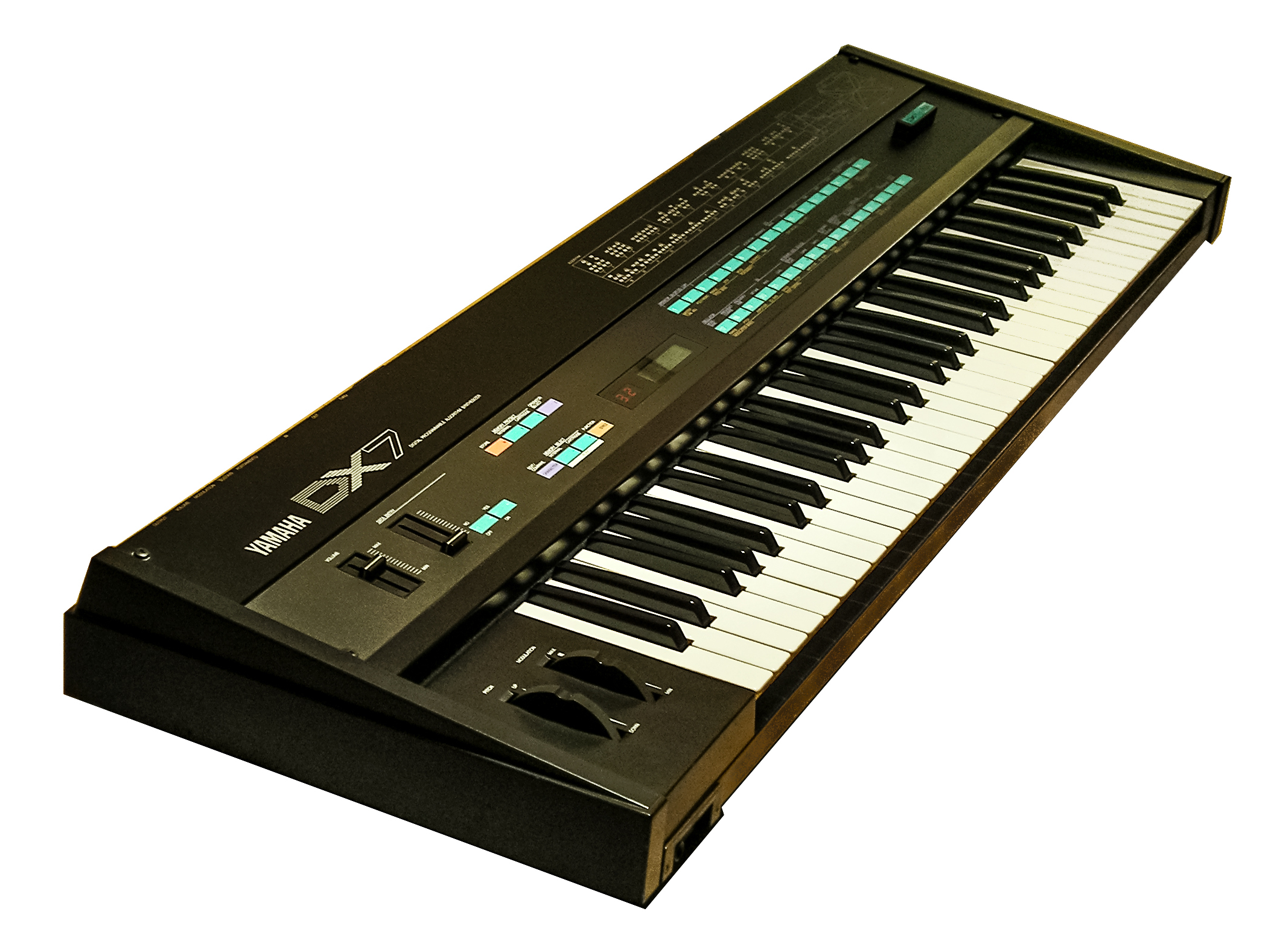
"On the Cool Side" was Sidran's first album to use electronic instruments, including the Yamaha DX7.

On the Cool Side was one of Sidran's first commercially successful solo releases, receiving significant airtime on contemporary jazz stations at the time. It was also his first album to use electronic instruments, including drum machines and a Yamaha DX7 synthesiser "to capture the spirit of the times".

Some album releases were pressed on translucent black vinyl.

== Reception ==
Professional ratings
Review scores
Source	Rating
AllMusic	4/5 stars

Writing for AllMusic, Jim Newsom commented the "music on this recording is heavily electronicized [..] but it sure sounds like a lot of fun." He summarised the eponymous track as "a classic of the genre, an upbeat, joyous affirmation of life, featuring a backing vocal from old pal Steve Miller [..] you'll find yourself walking down the street singing "keep on searching, keep it on the cool side" with a big smile on your face."

Newsom also praised the renditions of "Lover Man", "Heat Wave" and "Up a Lazy River" with Sidran's new "funky" elements.

== Track listing ==
Side one
No.	Title	Length
1.	"Mitsubishi Boy"	5:13
2.	"Lover Man Part 1"	2:57
3.	"Lover Man Part 2"	5:02
4.	"Brown Eyes"	3:55

Side two
No.	Title	Length
1.	"On the Cool Side"	5:50
2.	"Old Hoagy"	3:40
3.	"Heat Wave"	3:55
4.	"Up a Lazy River"	3:40

== Personnel ==
- Billy Peterson – bass (on "Lover Man Part 1" and "Lover Man Part 2")
- Howard Arthur – guitar (on "Mitsubishi Boy" and "Brown Eyes")
- Paul Peterson – synthesizer (on "Lover Man Part 1" and "Lover Man Part 2")
- Ricky Peterson – synthesizer, keyboards, backing vocals (on "Brown Eyes")
- Mac Rebennack – backing vocals (on "Up a Lazy River")
- Steve Miller – backing vocals (on "On the Cool Side")
- Patty Peterson – backing vocals (on "Heat Wave")
- Ben Sidran – synthesizer, keyboards, vocals
