= Unwanted Thoughts Syndrome =

Live album by Maria Bamford
- Released: April 21, 2009
- Recorded: August 2008
- Venue: Upright Citizens Brigade Theater, Hollywood, California
- Genre: Comedy
- Length: 50:44
- Label: Comedy Central
- Producer: Jack Vaughn Jr.

Maria Bamford chronology
How to WIN! (2007)	Unwanted Thoughts Syndrome (2009)

Unwanted Thoughts Syndrome is a live album by comedian Maria Bamford, her third album following 2007's How to Win! The title refers to a condition coined by Bamford, which she calls "a little known version of obsessive-compulsive disorder", which Bamford experiences. The album was recorded at Upright Citizens Brigade Theater in Hollywood, California in August 2008.

== Track listing ==
1. "Baby Jesus" – 3:33
2. "My Sister" – 2:19
3. "Learning" – 5:33
4. "Wizard of Art" – 1:25
5. "Getting Older" – 1:13
6. "Being a Good Person" – 1:28
7. "Mentor" – 1:43
8. "Vision Board" – 8:54
9. "Love Songs" – 4:02
10. "I Miss Working in an Office" – 8:07
11. "Free Clinic" – 9:29
12. "Road Show" – 2:58

== Personnel ==
- Maria Bamford – performer
- Martin Bauza – production
- John Brown Quintet – package design
- Ray Codrington – package design
- Damon Jones – director, editing, musician
- Steve Rossiter – mastering
- Ian Stearns – engineering
- Jack Vaughn Jr.;– production
