= Clémentine (musician) =

Clémentine Mitz
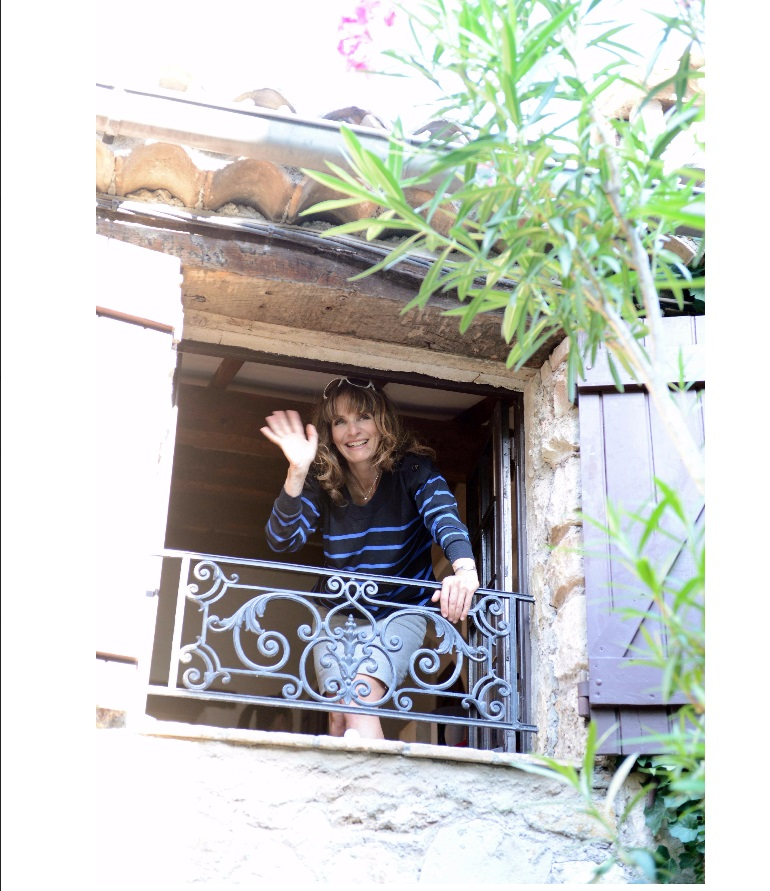
- Photo of clementine in her house in the south of France.

Background information
- Born: 23 September 1963 (age 62); Paris, France
- Genres: French Pop, Jazz, Bossa Nova
- Occupations: Singer, songwriter
- Years active: 1988–present
- Labels: Sony Music Japan, Epic, EMI
- Website: www.possion-h.com/cle

Clémentine is a French singer and songwriter based in Japan. She debuted in France in 1988 with the single, "Absolument Jazz". In addition to many releases as a singer, she has appeared regularly on the entertainment segment for NHK Educational TV, "French TV".

Collaborates frequently with other artists, mostly in Japan. Recently, she has often collaborated with her daughter, Solita, who is also a singer.

== History ==
Clémentine was born in Paris but traveled extensively as a child. As her father's work took the family to Mexico and other locations around the world, she became immersed in Bossa Nova and other local flavors of music.

Upon returning to France, she began piano lessons at age 10 and enrolled in jazz school at age 12. She launched her professional career in 1987 by sending a demo tape to Jazz greats Johnny Griffin and Ben Sidran, who subsequently invited her to record several songs with them.

In 1988, she released her debut single, "Absolument Jazz" with CBS France. She signed with Sony Music Entertainment Japan in 1990, and released many singles and albums. Between 2003 and 2005, she moved to the Epic Records Japan label, and from 2005 to 2008 to Toshiba EMI. She eventually returned to Sony Music Entertainment in 2008.

In 2015, she performed in many Buddhist and Shinto temples across Japan, accompanied by AUN J Classic Orchestra.

In 2018 and 2019, she became Godmother of the Tandem Tokyo Festival.

Although she regularly travels to Japan, where her career takes place, Clémentine continues to live in Paris.

== Discography ==
=== Singles ===
- "Absolument Jazz" (1988); vinyl CBS-651456
- "A St Tropez" (1992.6.21); SRDS-8234
- "Pillow Talk Re-Mix" (1992.11.21); SRCS 6569
- "Jérie Boit Du Caffè Latte" (1993.3.21); SRDS-8252
- "Un Homme et Une Femme" (1994.9.7); SRCS-7447
- "L'étoile Du Bonheur" (1994.12.21); SRCS-7562
- "It's a shame" (1997.7.18); SMA 664602 1 (France)
- "Poisson Lune" (1997.10.22); SRCS-8465
- "La Fete" (1998.10.28); SRCS-8794
- "Un Dia De Estos" (1999.1.27); SRCS-8875
- "Couleur Café" (1999.6.19); SRCS-8959
- "Collines Violettes" (2000.3.8); SRCS-2233
- "二人でゆっくり ~Tous deux tout doux~" (2001.11.21); AICL-1356
  - Clémentine with Jinsei Tsuji
- "Tenohira wo taiyouni" (2004.9.15); ESCL-2582
  - Duet with daughter Solita

=== Albums ===
- Spread Your Wings (1989); vinyl, cassette & CD in France only
  - Clémentine and Ben Sidran (1991.11.21); SRCS-5689
  - later release (2002.3.6); SICP-5029
- Continent Bleu (1989.11.11); CSCS-5026
- Mes Nuits, Mes Jours (1990.11.21); CSCS-5332
- En Privé (1992.7.1); SRCS-5898
- Long Courrier (1993.7.1); SRCS-6760
- Clémentine Sings Ben Sidran (1993.11.18); SRCS-6887
  - later release (2002.3.6); SICP-5030
- Ils et elle (1994.9.21); SRCS-7458
- Solita (1997.5.1); SRCS-8284
- Heure D'Ete (1998.11.6); SRCS-8793
- Couleur Café (1999.7.1); SRCS-8957
- Les Voyages (2000.9.27); SRCS-2337
- Continent Bleu (2000.11.22); SRCS-9628
- Café Aprés-midi [Compilation] (2001.7.18); SRCS-2503
- Lil' Darlin' (2001.12.12); SICP-4
- 30 °C (2002.8.7); SICP-190
- Clé (2003.6.4); ESCL-2409
- Soleil (2004.7.7); ESCL-2687
- Made in France (2005.6.20); TOCP-67700
- Lumiere (2006.6.14); TOCP-67976
- Chocolats et Sweets (2008.7.23); SICP-1922
- Sweet Rendez-vous (2008.9.24); SICP-1954
- Sweet Illumination (2008.11.26); SICP-2077
- Animentine~Bossa du Animé (2010.7.21); SICP-2770

=== "Best-of" albums ===
- A Suivre...～The Very Best of Clementine～ (1996.11.11); SRCS-8166
- Clémentine de Best (2004.11.26); SICP-641

=== Tribute albums ===
- Clementine Sings Disney (2014.11.26); AVCW-63038
