= Leo Sidran =

American singer-songwriter

- Born: November 27, 1976 (age 49); Madison, Wisconsin, United States
- Genres: Jazz, Latin, pop
- Occupation: Musician
- Instruments: Vocals, guitar, keyboards, drums
- Years active: 1993–present
- Website: leosidran.com

Leo Sidran is an American Latin Grammy-winning musician, composer, performer, and producer whose credits include co-producing the Oscar-winning song "Al Otro Lado Del Rio" for the soundtrack to the movie The Motorcycle Diaries.

Sidran began his career in music early. Having learned to play the drums from funk-jazz percussionist Clyde Stubblefield, he wrote songs as a teenager for Steve Miller.

== Early life and education ==
Sidran grew up in Madison, Wisconsin. His father, Ben Sidran, is a jazz musician, producer and historian. His mother is a weaver. Leo attended the University of Wisconsin, graduating in 1999 with a degree in history and integrated liberal studies. While still in high school, he developed a fascination with Spain and the Spanish language, and moved to Seville for a year in college. He relocated from Madison to Brooklyn in 2005 and has lived there since.

== Early music career ==
Sidran began playing and writing music at a young age. He wrote his first song, "Pushing and Shoving", when he was six years old, and recorded a demo of the song with his father. The vocal from that demo was later used on the Sidrans' father-son children's music album El Elefante.

His first instrument was the drums, and his first teacher was Clyde Stubblefield. Sidran later produced Stubblefield's solo record The Original. As a drummer, Sidran has recorded on many of his father's records, including Nick's Bump, Don't Cry For No Hipster, and the Grammy-nominated Concert for Garcia Lorca.

The Steve Miller Band recorded Sidran's songs before he had graduated from high school. Miller, a longtime friend and collaborator with his father, taught Sidran to play the guitar.

Also while still in high school, Sidran began performing regularly as a jazz drummer with his father. His earliest performances included shows with bassist Richard Davis, saxophonists Frank Morgan and Richie Cole, and guitarist Phil Upchurch.

== Solo recordings ==
Sidran released his first solo record, Leo and the Depleting Moral Legacy, while he was in college. The album was a collection of songs he had written mostly in high school, including two songs that had already been recorded by Steve Miller. He played many of the instruments and mixed the record; Paul Peterson, Ricky Peterson, and Steve Marker also contributed.

After returning from Spain, Sidran recorded two bilingual solo albums. In 1998 he recorded L. Sid in Minneapolis with a studio band including Anthony Cox, Gordy Knudtson and Bob Malach. In 2003 he released Bohemia, an album recorded in Madison and Madrid, and featuring appearances by Spanish artists including Jorge Drexler, Ana Laan, and Tino di Geraldo, and American collaborators including Freedy Johnston, Holly Brook, and Howard Levy.

Sidran's fourth solo record, Mucho Leo, was released in October 2014 and featured the song "Speak To Me In Spanish". It was followed in 2018 by a tribute to Michael Franks called Cool School (The Music Of Michael Franks), which was recorded in New York and Paris and featured a duet performed between Sidran and Franks.

== Productions ==
During the process of recording Bohemia, Sidran became friendly with Jorge Drexler and Ana Laan, and eventually went on to produce and perform regularly with both. He co-produced Laan's Oregano and Chocolate and Roses albums, as well as Drexler's Oscar-winning song, "Al Otro Lado Del Rio".

In 2003 Sidran started Nardis Records with his father. The name "Nardis" comes from a Miles Davis composition, but is also Sidran's name spelled backwards. The label was set up as a vehicle to release projects by both father and son, and both have released their recent solo projects as well as other artist productions on the label.

A chance encounter at a jam session in Madison with singer-songwriter Joy Dragland would ultimately lead to the creation of Joy and the Boy; primarily a studio project, the duo released three albums. Their cover of Marvin Gaye's "Let's Get It On" debuted in the Top 40 pop radio charts in Spain.

After moving to New York in 2005, Sidran developed his career as a composer for film and television commercials. He has scored over 100 national television commercials, and six feature-length documentaries including At The Death House Door and No Crossover: The Trial of Allen Iverson, directed by Steve James.

== The Third Story ==
In 2014, Leo Sidran started a podcast called The Third Story, in which he interviews musicians, artists, and writers. His first guest was Will Lee, and subsequent interviews included scientist Daniel Levitin, pianist Jon Batiste, singer Madeleine Peyroux, arranger/producer Rob Mounsey record producer Tommy LiPuma, and hundreds more. In 2022 The Third Story joined WBGO Studios.

== Discography ==
- Depleting Moral Legacy (1999)
- L Sid (2000)
- Bohemia (2004)
- Mucho Leo (2014)
- Entre Chien Et Loup (2015)
- Cool School (The Music of Michael Franks) (2018)
- The Art of Conversation (2021)
- What's Trending (2023)

=== With Joy and The Boy ===
- Paradise (2004)
- Soaking Wet (2007)
- Secret Place (2009)

=== With Ben Sidran ===
- The Concert for García Lorca (Go Jazz, 1999)
- El Elefante (Liquid 8, 2001)
- Nick's Bump (Nardis, 2003)
- Cien Noches (Nardis, 2008)
- Dylan Different (Nardis, 2009)
- Don't Cry For No Hipster (Nardis, 2013)
- Blue Camus (Nardis, 2014)
- Picture Him Happy (Nardis, 2017)
