= Paralyzed by Hope: The Maria Bamford Story =

- Directed by: Judd Apatow; Neil Berkeley
- Produced by: Judd Apatow; Neil Berkeley; David Heiman; Amanda Rohlke
- Starring: Maria Bamford
- Cinematography: Neil Berkeley
- Edited by: James Leche
- Release date: January 22, 2026 (Sundance)
- Running time: 116 minutes
- Country: United States
- Language: English

Paralyzed by Hope: The Maria Bamford Story is a 2026 American documentary film which explores the life and career of comedian Maria Bamford. It was directed by Judd Apatow and Neil Berkeley.

== Reception ==
On the review aggregator website Rotten Tomatoes, 96% of 26 critics' reviews are positive, with an average rating of 7.9/10. Metacritic, which uses a weighted average, assigned the film a score of 72 out of 100, based on 10 critics, indicating "generally favorable" reviews.

Daniel Fienberg of The Hollywood Reporter wrote, "[I]t's a good opportunity to fall in love with Maria Bamford if you're unfamiliar." Gregory Nussen of Screen Rant gave the film a score of 8 out of 10 and wrote that it "is an essential doc that reveals the origins of her singular voice with exceeding warmth and vulnerability."
