= Cool Paradise =

Studio album by Ben Sidran
- Released: 1990
- Genres: Jazz; Smooth jazz Jazz fusion
- Length: 47:52
- Language: English
- Label: Go Jazz
- Producer: Ben Sidran

Cool Paradise is a smooth jazz album by keyboardist and jazz vocalist Ben Sidran, released in 1990. It is Sidran's eighteenth album, and his first release with the Go Jazz label he started in 1989.

== Track listing ==
No.	Title	Writer(s)	Length
1.	"Cool Paradise"	Sidran	5:42
2.	"Lip Service"	Sidran	3:22
3.	"If Someone Has to Wreck Your Life"	Pat MacDonald	4:14
4.	"She Steps into a Dream"	Sidran	4:17
5.	"Try"	Sidran	4:17
6.	"Language of the Blues"	Pat MacDonald	4:13
7.	"Desire of Love"	Bottini, Sidran, Telesforo	4:44
8.	"Bye Bye Blackbird"	Mort Dixon, Henderson	4:03
9.	"So Long"	Sidran	3:34
10.	"Walking With The Blues"	Sidran	6:10
11.	"Searching for a Girl Like You"	Sidran	3:11

== Personnel ==
=== Musicians ===
- Arrangement – Billy Peterson
- Lead vocals – Ben Sidran
- Background vocals – Ricky Peterson
- Bass – Billy Peterson
- Keyboards – Ricky Peterson, Ben Sidran
- Tenor saxophone – Bob Malach

=== Support ===
- Recording and mixing – Steve Wiese at Creation Audio, Minneapolis, MN
- Mastering – George Marino at Sterling Sound, New York
- Additional recording – John "Chopper" Black
- Art direction – Toni Eckmayer, Zillman Advertising & Marketing
- Design – Planet Design Company, Madison, Wisconsin

== Reception ==
Professional ratings
Review scores
Source	Rating
AllMusic	4.5/5 stars

Writing for AllMusic, Jim Newsom declared Cool Paradise to be Sidran's "most fully realized recording"; complimenting his working band, audio clarity, Sidran's "cool and relaxed" voice and his "compelling" compositions. He concludes "it's surprising that Sidran hasn't become better known in pop and contemporary jazz circles" for such material.
