= L Sid =

L. Sid

Studio album by Leo Sidran
- Released: February 15, 2000
- Recorded: December 27–30, 1998
- Genre: Rock
- Length: 59:29
- Label: Go Jazz Records
- Producer: Ben Sidran, Leo Sidran

Leo Sidran chronology
Depleting Moral Legacy (1999)	L. Sid (2000)	Bohemia (2004)

L Sid is the second solo album by Leo Sidran. It was released on February 15, 2000, on Go Jazz Records. It was the first album by Sidran dually composed in English and Castilian.

== Track listing ==
All of the songs were written by Leo Sidran.

1. "43 Con Piña" - 4:39
2. "What We Know" - 3:39
3. "Home" - 3:39
4. "In The Stars" (En Las Estrellas) - 4:22
5. "Better Off Alone" - 3:21
6. "Old Enough" - 4:42
7. "Pushing & Shoving" - 2:48
8. "Sevillanas" - 3:44
9. "It Wasn't Supposed To Happen This Way" - 4:16
10. "La Mitad" - 4:00
11. "Hypnotized" - 5:02
12. "Gloria" - 4:02
13. "I'm Gone" - 3:04
14. "Enjoy Yourself" - 4:33
15. "Times Before" - 3:38

== Personnel ==
=== Performance ===
- Mark Anderson – percussion
- Anthony Cox – bass
- Al Falaschi – Background vocals
- Ken Holmen – tenor saxophone
- Gordon Knudtson – Snare drums
- Bob Malach – tenor saxophone
- Michael Nelson – trombone, horn arrangements
- Ricky Peterson – piano, keyboards, orchestration
- Ben Sidran – piano, orchestration
- Leo Sidran – guitar, vocals

=== Production ===
- James Farber – mixing
- Mark Haines – assistant engineer
- George Marino – mastering
- Ben Sidran – producer
- Leo Sidran – producer, engineer
- Steve Wiese – engineer
- Mike Zirkel – engineer
