= Ask My Mom =

- Genre: Comedy
- Created by: Maria Bamford
- Directed by: Joseph Arnao
- Starring: Maria Bamford
- Country of origin: United States
- Original language: English
- No. of seasons: 1
- No. of episodes: 9 (list of episodes)

Production
- Producer: Milka Alexandrino
- Production locations: Los Angeles, California
- Running time: 0:56-1:46 minutes

Original release
- Network: Mydamnchannel; Blip
- Release: May 22 – June 13, 2013

Ask My Mom is an American comedy web series created by American stand up comedian Maria Bamford. The series is broadcast on the internet and premiered on May 22, 2013. 9 episodes have been made and the show can be found distributed across the web including on Blip. Ask My Mom is about Maria playing both herself and her mother, whilst answering questions from viewers on just about anything and everything.

== History ==
Ask My Mom was inspired and written by Maria Bamford, a stand up comedian who has made appearances in many movies and television shows such as playing Debrie Bardeaux in series four of Arrested Development, as well as starring in her own show The Maria Bamford Show. The character for Ask My Mom is Bamford’s mother, Marilyn, who was a previous character in The Maria Bamford Show, a 20 episode web series. The Maria Bamford Show used to take questions over email sent through Bamford’s website, a similar format to Ask My Mom.

== Plot ==
The plot involves Maria acting as her mom. The character of Maria's mom is described by Bamford as "...a 70-year-old retired family therapist and a Netflix connoisseur. She has years of wisdom to tackle any query, question or fact of life. But, she's also one of the busiest senior citizens on the planet. We can only get her to answer questions while she's getting something done, but it's priceless hard-hitting advice - whether she's microwaving baked potatoes, doing yard work or jumping on a mini-trampoline."

== Episodes ==
- Episode 1: "Sad Sack" - Maria's mom dishes wisdom on what a sad sack can offer the world.
- Episode 2: "Sex" - Maria's 70-year-old mom, gives advice about sex.
- Episode 3: "Raising Kids" - Maria's mom gives advice on how to communicate with teenagers.
- Episode 4: "Abstract" - Sometimes the simplest questions yield the deepest answers.
- Episode 5: "Religion" - Religion without the fuss.
- Episode 6: "Show Business" - There's no business like show business.
- Episode 7: "Favorite"
- Episode 8: "Cheerful"
- Episode 9: "A Private Moment"
