= Maria Bamford =

American stand-up comedian and actress (born 1970)

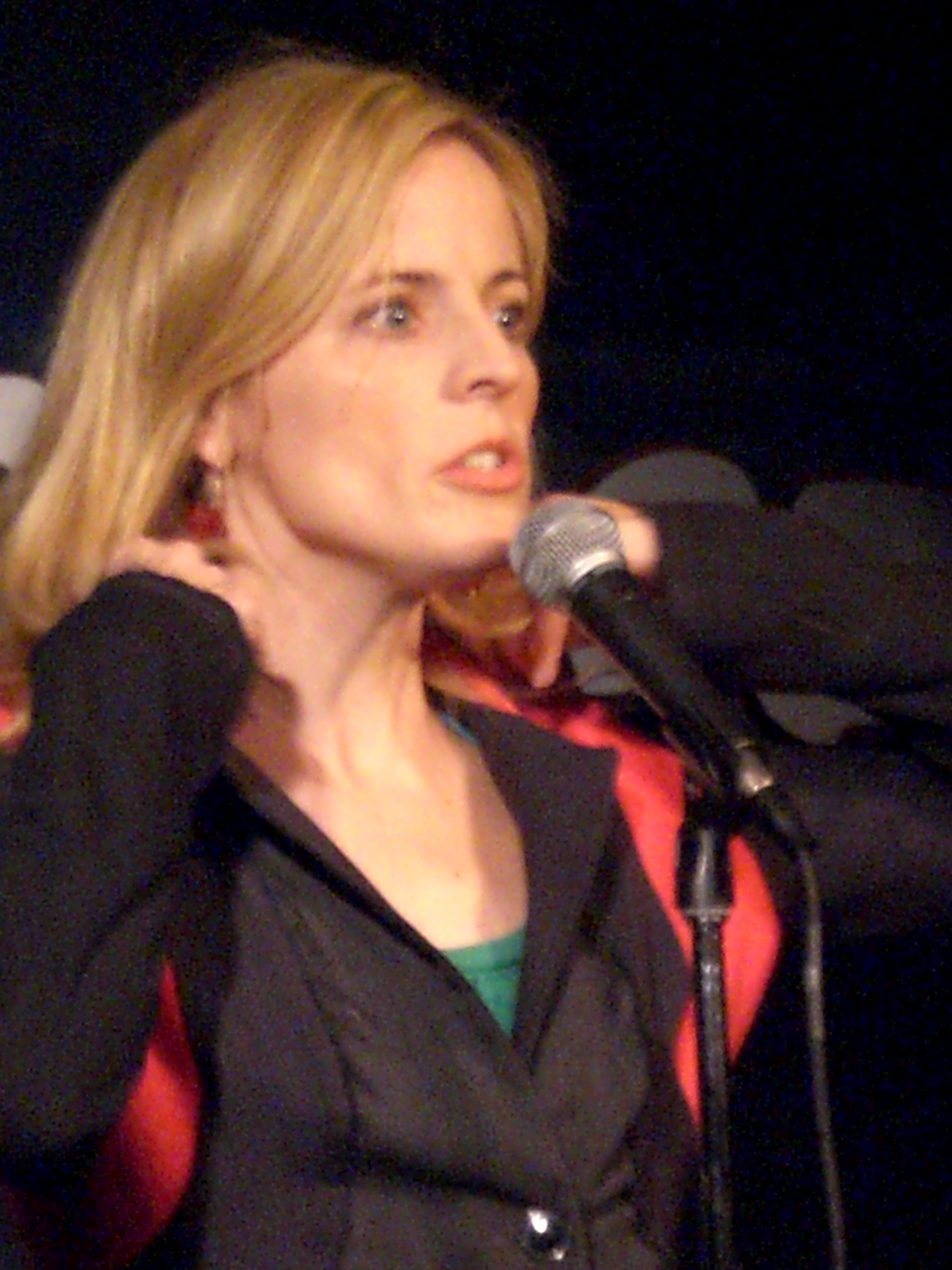
- Bamford in 2008
- Born: September 3, 1970 (age 56); Port Hueneme, California
- Education: Bates College; University of Edinburgh; University of Minnesota (BA)
- Occupations: Actress; comedian
- Years active: 1989–present
- Spouse: Scott Marvel Cassidy (m. 2015; div. 2026)

Comedy career
- Medium: Stand-up; television; film
- Genres: Observational comedy; character comedy; surreal humor; alternative comedy; black comedy
- Subjects: Pop culture; personal life; mental health
- Website: mariabamford.com

Maria Bamford (born September 3, 1970) is an American actress and stand-up comedian. Her work often uses self-deprecating and dark topics, including her dysfunctional family, depression, anxiety, suicidal ideation, and mental illness.

Her first comedy album and tour was The Burning Bridges Tour (2003), followed by eight more albums and specials. One of her first feature films is Lucky Numbers (2000), and she voiced characters on many animated shows, including Scorpi on Mixels, Shriek on CatDog, and many more on American Dad!, Ugly Americans, Adventure Time, and BoJack Horseman. Her film work includes Stuart Little 2 (2002), Charlotte's Web 2: Wilbur's Great Adventure (2003), Barnyard (2006), Heckler (2007), and Hell and Back (2015). Her other work began in Louie (2012), Arrested Development (2013–2019), WordGirl (2007–2015), Talking Tom & Friends (2014–2021), Big Mouth (2017–2025), Flatbush Misdemeanors (2021–2022), and Human Resources (2022–2023). In 2014, she won the American Comedy Award for Best Club Comic.

The 2016 Netflix original series Lady Dynamite, in which she plays the lead role, is based on her life. She voiced Tito, the Anxiety Mosquito, in Big Mouth and its spinoff, Human Resources. In 2023, she released a memoir, titled Sure, I'll Join Your Cult. The 2026 documentary Paralyzed by Hope: The Maria Bamford Story explores her life and career.

== Early life ==
Bamford's father, Joel Bamford, served as a Navy doctor. She grew up in Duluth, Minnesota, attending Chester Park Elementary and Duluth Marshall School. She has stated that when she was younger, she was often troubled with her anxiety, depression, and what she has called "Unwanted Thoughts Syndrome", a subset of obsessive–compulsive disorder.

Upon graduating from high school, she attended Bates College in Lewiston, Maine. In 1992, she transferred to the University of Edinburgh in Scotland at the start of her junior year. She became the first female member of the college's improvised comedy group, The Improverts. After a year in Scotland, she transferred back to her home state and enrolled at the University of Minnesota, where she earned a Bachelor of Arts degree in English. She began stand-up comedy in Minneapolis, Minnesota, at age 19, at Stevie Ray's Comedy Cabaret.

== Career ==
=== 1998–2008: Comedy beginnings ===
Bamford has been in many movies and television shows, including cartoon voices. She was the voice of Shriek DuBois in Nickelodeon's CatDog, a wide selection of secondary characters in Cartoon Network's Adventure Time, and Mrs. Botsford, Violet, and Leslie on the PBS educational series WordGirl. She does impersonations, including her mother and her agent. Her stand-up comedy often takes the form of vignettes rather than the standard setup-and-punchline format.

Bamford was featured in the documentary series The Comedians of Comedy on Comedy Central and Showtime, and appears in short skits titled The Maria Bamford Show, broadcast on the website Super Deluxe. She appears on the comedy compilation CD Comedy Death-Ray.

=== 2008–2014: Rise to prominence ===
Her album Unwanted Thoughts Syndrome, produced by Comedy Central Records, was released in April 2009 and includes a DVD containing The Maria Bamford Show episodes. During the Christmas 2009–2010 shopping seasons, she was featured in a series of Target commercials, portraying an over eager shopper determined to be first in line. For Christmas 2009, she released a free stand-up special online as a gift to her fans.

While working in voice-over shows and advertisements in Los Angeles, she was hospitalized three times over the course of 18 months for nervous breakdowns. She commented on the hospital visits by saying "it was the responsible thing to do" after she felt "suicidal" and "dispirited". In 2012, she released The Special Special Special for download through Chill.com. The special was recorded at her own home in Los Angeles with only her parents present as the audience.

In 2013, she created and starred in a web series called Ask My Mom. She plays both herself and her mother, who answers questions sent in by fans. Also in 2013, she appeared as herself in one episode of the interview web series All Growz Up with Melinda Hill. She voiced Pema in the Nickelodeon cartoon The Legend of Korra.

In 2013, she appeared in season four of Arrested Development as Debrie Bardeaux, Tobias Fünke's love interest. The series creator noted her as a comical "genius" and said that "real artists [like Maria] talk about things that nobody else talks about, and talk about them candidly." She remained on the series until it concluded in 2019.

=== 2014–present: Lady Dynamite and critical acclaim ===
She appeared in the third season of Louis C.K.'s Louie. In 2014, she co-created, wrote, and starred in The Program with Melinda Hill, produced by Funny or Die. In 2014, she won the American Comedy Award for Best Club Comic. In January 2016, she was a guest on The Late Show with Stephen Colbert, where host Stephen Colbert called her his "favorite comedian on planet Earth".

In early 2016, Netflix announced an original series based on her life, called Lady Dynamite, starring her, released in May 2016. She was invited to the writing process. She did not write any episodes, but was often in the writers' room, discussing ideas and "hanging out". The writers had freedom to modify her experiences for creative purposes.

In May 2017, she was the commencement speaker for the University of Minnesota's College of Liberal Arts. During the speech, she gave a check made out to Sallie Mae for $5,000, her net speaking fee, to a graduate in the audience who had student loans. In April 2018, she appeared on season 13 of Worst Cooks in America. She was eliminated in the fourth episode.

On September 5, 2023, her book, Sure, I'll Join Your Cult: A Memoir of Mental Illness and the Quest to Belong Anywhere, was released by Gallery Books. On September 24, 2023, the book entered the New York Times Combined Print & E-Book Nonfiction best seller list at #11.

== Comedy style ==
Maria Bamford is the most unique, bizarre, imaginative comedian out there right now.

— Judd Apatow

Bamford's unique comedic style has drawn praise from many in the comedy world. She is best known for her portrayal of her dysfunctional family and self-deprecating comedy involving jokes about depression and anxiety. Her comedy style is surreal and incorporates voice impressions of various character types. Zach Freeman of the Chicago Tribune has noted her content and comedic style as "comically erratic" with "seemingly unrelated tangents and constantly varying vocal inflections". David Sims of The Atlantic noted her roles and voice work as having themes of "serial passivity" stemming from her "polite upbringing and own internal anxieties". Film producer Judd Apatow has described her comedic style as "complex" and "bizarre", later calling her "the funniest woman in the world". Variety described Bamford's performance in Lady Dynamite, saying that "the actress and comedian, whose presence has rarely been used as well as it is here, manages the neat trick of being both believably guileless and winningly sharp." A 2014 New York Times profile of Bamford noted her comedic style by saying:

Much of Bamford's work examines the relationship between "people" — generally well-intentioned friends and family — and those who grapple with depression or anxiety or any other challenge to the psyche. Her act is a series of monologues and mini skits performed rapid fire and often without regard for transition. Deploying a range of deadpan voices, she mimics the faux enlightened who hover around the afflicted, offering toothless platitudes, bootstrapping pep talks, or concern warped by self-interest. The humor of any given moment relies not so much on punch lines as it does on the impeccably timed swerves of her tone, the interplay between Bamford's persona and those of all the people who don't get her.

== Personal life ==
Bamford stated in an interview with The Salt Lake Tribune that she has been diagnosed with bipolar II disorder, and obsessive–compulsive disorder (OCD). In stand-up, she describes bipolar as "the new gladiator sandal".

On December 11, 2014, during her show at the Neptune Theater in Seattle, she announced that she was engaged to artist Scott Marvel Cassidy. They were married at a private ceremony in 2015. In March 2025, Bamford and Cassidy separated, and as of January 2026 they are in the process of finalizing their divorce. She has one sister, Sarah Seidelmann, who is a physician, life coach and Shamanic healer. She has a private residence in Los Angeles, California, and a home in Altadena, California. She loves pugs, and typically owns at least one senior pug at any given time.

== Filmography ==
=== Film ===
Year	Title	Role	Notes
1998	Denial	Newscaster	
2000	Lucky Numbers	Wendy	
2002	Stuart Little 2	Teacher	
2003	Charlotte's Web 2: Wilbur's Great Adventure	Aranea / Button / additional voices	Voice
2005	The Comedians of Comedy	Herself	Documentary
2006	Barnyard	Mrs. Beady	Voice
2007	Heckler	Herself	Documentary
2014	Muffin Top: A Love Story	Angelique	
2015	Hell and Back	Gloria	Voice
2015	Misery Loves Comedy	Herself	Documentary
2018	An Evening with Beverly Luff Linn	Elegant Woman	
2018	Seven Stages to Achieve Eternal Bliss	Cultist	
2021	Extinct	Bo's Mom	Voice
2022	The Bubble	Carol's Mom	
2022	The People's Joker	Lorne Michaels	Voice
2024	Micro Budget	Darby	
2026	Paralyzed by Hope: The Maria Bamford Story	Herself	Documentary

=== Television ===
Year	Title	Role	Notes
1994	Mystery Science Theater 3000	Fiddler	Episode: "Bloodlust!"
1998	The Tom Show	Christy	Episode: "The Band"
1998–99	Hey Arnold!	Mayor Dixie / various	Voice, 3 episodes
1998–2005	CatDog	Shriek DuBois	Voice, 58 episodes
1999	Dharma & Greg	Sandy	Episode: "Death & Violins"
1999–2004	Home Movies	Additional voices	3 episodes
2000	Men in Black: The Series		Voice, episode: "The Back to School Syndrome"
2000–01	The Trouble with Normal	Dora	2 episodes
2001	The Tonight Show with Jay Leno	Herself	2 episodes
2001–02	Late Friday	Herself	2 episodes
2001, 2007	Comedy Central Presents	Herself	2 episodes; also writer
2002	Comic Remix	Herself	
2002	Premium Blend	Herself	1 episode
2003	Hey Monie!	Sex Education Teacher	Voice, episode: "For Pet's Sake"
2003	The World Comedy Tour: Melbourne 2003	Herself	TV special
2004, 2016	Jimmy Kimmel Live!	Herself	2 episodes
2005	Tom Goes to the Mayor	Home Shopping Woman / Sandy	Voice, episode: "Porcelain Birds"
2005	Rove Live	Herself	Episode: "#6.7"
2005–15	The Late Late Show with Craig Ferguson	Herself	4 episodes
2006	Shorty McShorts' Shorts	Additional voices	3 episodes
2007	American Dad!	Randy's Mother	Voice, episode: "The 42-Year-Old Virgin"
2007–08	Tim and Eric Awesome Show, Great Job!	Various	3 episodes
2007–11	Back at the Barnyard	Mrs. Beady	Voice, 30 episodes
2007–15	WordGirl	Violet / Sally Botsford / Leslie / Johnson / Mrs. Best / Energy Monster (in "Dinner or Consequences") / Loretta-Sanchez Johnson	Voice, 87 episodes
2009	Sit Down, Shut Up	Various voices	9 episodes
2010	The Sarah Silverman Program	Mae Kadoodie	Episode: "Nightmayor"
2010	Check It Out! with Dr. Steve Brule	Cynthia Driscoll	Episode: "Health"
2010	Ugly Americans	Various voices	3 episodes
2010	The Cartoonstitute	Captain, Zack	2 episodes
2010–11	John Oliver's New York Stand-Up Show	Herself	3 episodes
2010–12	Kick Buttowski: Suburban Daredevil	"Wacky" Jackie Wackerman	Voice, 7 episodes
2010–18	Adventure Time	Various voices	69 episodes
2011	Nick Swardson's Pretend Time	Linda Martin	Episode: "Flying Stripper"
2011	Conan	Herself	Episode: "Happy One Year Anniversary to Us, and to Lisa and Greg Drucker of Wayne, New Jersey"
2011	Adam Hills in Gordon Street Tonight	Herself	Episode: "#1.8"
2011–16	Kung Fu Panda: Legends of Awesomeness	Chen	Voice, 8 episodes
2012	Louie	Maria	2 episodes
2012	Unsupervised	Various voices	7 episodes
2012–14	The Legend of Korra	Pema	Voice, 19 episodes
2013	Comedy.tv	Herself	Episode #1
2013	Kroll Show	Denise Ryan	2 episodes
2013	Tales of Metropolis	Lois Lane	Voice, 2 episodes
2013	The Nerdist	Herself	Episode: "Space!"
2013–15	Golan the Insatiable	Carole Beekler	Voice, 12 episodes
2013–19	Arrested Development	Debrie Bardeaux	15 episodes
2014	Chozen		Voice, episode: "Pilot"
2014	The Program	Peace	2 episodes; also writer and executive producer
2014	Benched	Cheryl	8 episodes
2014	Mixels	Scorpi	Voice
2014–16	TripTank	Various voices	6 episodes
2014–17	@midnight	Herself	4 episodes
2014–19	BoJack Horseman	Kelsey Jannings / various	Voice, 9 episodes
2015	Comedy Bang! Bang!	Claire Coulter	Episode: "Maya Rudolph Wears a Black Skirt & Strappy Sandals"
2015	Clarence	Dillis	Voice, episode: "Hurricane Dillis"
2015	Maron	Herself	Episode: "Mad Marc"
2015	Axe Cop	Various voices	3 episodes
2015	Your Pretty Face Is Going to Hell	The Thin Twins	Voice, episode: "Psyklone and the Thin Twins"
2015	Pickle and Peanut	Kandy	Voice, episode: "PAL-SCAN/America's Sweetboy"
2015–16	Fresh Off the Boat	Principal Thomas	4 episodes
2015–17	Pig Goat Banana Cricket	Various voices	4 episodes
2015–17	Penn Zero: Part-Time Hero	Various voices	12 episodes
2015–18	The Adventures of Puss in Boots	The Duchess	Voice, 12 episodes
2016	Take My Wife	Maria	Episode: "Punchline"
2016	Flophouse	Herself	Episode: "Haircuts at Babe Island"
2016	The Late Show with Stephen Colbert	Herself	Episode: "Scott Kelly/Abby Wambach/Maria Bamford"
2016–17	Lady Dynamite	Maria Bamford	20 episodes; also executive producer
2016–19	Star vs. the Forces of Evil	Various voices	3 episodes
2017	Portlandia	Humane Society Volunteer	Episode: "Misunderstood Miracles"
2017	We Bare Bears	Miss Chriss	Voice, episode: "Panda's Art"
2017	Ginger Snaps	Vivian	Voice, 10 episodes
2017	Downward Dog	Pepper	Voice, 4 episodes
2017	Mighty Magiswords	Tara-Byte 11.0	Voice, episode: "The Saga of Robopiggeh!"
2017	Bob's Burgers	Kendra / Catherine	Voice, episode: "Sit Me Baby One More Time"
2017	Harvey Beaks	Grada	Voice, episode: "The End and the Beginning"
2018	Liverspots and Astronots	Various voices	4 episodes
2018	Stan Against Evil	Nurse Pickles	Episode: "Intensive Scare Unit"
2018	The Shivering Truth	Lover / Elderly Woman	Voice, episode: "Tow and Shell"
2018	Worst Cooks in America	Herself	4 episodes
2018	Dream Corp LLC	Norf Norf	2 episodes
2019	SuperMansion	Teach	Voice, episode: "Teacher and the Goof"
2019	Victor and Valentino	Guandelupe	Voice, episode: "Los Cadejos"
2019	SpongeBob SquarePants	Macadamia, Hazelnut, Pistachio	Voice, episode: "Sandy's Nutty Nieces"
2019	Ask the StoryBots	Dr. Pat the Mad Scientist	Voice, episode: "How Do Eyes See?"
2019–20	The Rocketeer	Laura	Voice, 6 episodes
2019–20	Tigtone	Spaceress	Voice, 3 episodes
2020	The Midnight Gospel	Various voices	2 episodes
2020	Butterbean's Café	Queen Batilda	Voice, episode: "The Legend of the Shadow Bean!"
2020–21	Adventure Time: Distant Lands	Various voices	2 episodes
2020–23	Animaniacs	Julia / Tammy	Voice, 4 episodes
2020–25	Big Mouth	Tito the Anxiety Mosquito	Voice, recurring role
2021	Everything's Gonna Be Okay	Suze	4 episodes
2021	Kenan	Glory	Episode: "Wednesday's Gal"
2021	Tuca & Bertie	Patricia Ramsey	Voice, 3 episodes
2021	I Heart Arlo	Various voices	8 episodes
2021	Summer Camp Island	The Royal Mush / Foghorn / Polly / Sandy	Voice, 6 episodes
2021	Santa Inc.	Mrs. Claus / Big Candy	Voice, 8 episodes
2021	Centaurworld	Malangella, Maitre D, Opposumtaur	Voice, 3 episodes
2021–22	Flatbush Misdemeanors	Maria	2 episodes
2021–23	HouseBroken	Jill / Big Cookie / Various	Voice, recurring role
2021–23	Teenage Euthanasia	Trophy Fantasy	Voice, main role
2022	Mr. Mayor	Leaf	Episode: "The Illusion of Choice"
2022	Wolfboy and the Everything Factory	Sky Ancient	Episode: "We Search Above"
2022–23	Human Resources	Tito the Anxiety Mosquito	Voice
2023	Rick and Morty	Churry	Voice, episode: "Rickfending Your Mort"
2023	Night Court	Ghost of Christmas Present	Episode: "The Night Court Before Christmas"
2024	After Midnight	Herself	2 episodes
2025	Futurama	Jambone	Season 10; episode: "The Trouble with Truffles"
2025	The Bad Guys: The Series	Peppy Sweet Pots	Voice; episode: "The Sweet, Sweet Steal"
2026	Adventure Time: Side Quests	Wildberry Princess, various voices	Voice; 11 episodes
2026	President Curtis	Soul Ganderer	Voice; 2 episodes

=== Video games ===
Year	Title	Role	Notes
2000	Escape from Monkey Island	Brittany the Bank Teller	
2016	Lego Dimensions	Manfried the Talking Piñata	

=== Web series ===
Year	Title	Role	Notes
2007	The Maria Bamford Show	Herself, her mother, her father, her sister, others	
2012	SuperF*ckers	Princess Sunshine, Computer Fist	Voice
2012–2018	Bravest Warriors	Pixel, Gayle, Elves, others	Voice
2013	Ask My Mom	Herself, her mother Marilyn Bamford	
2014–2021	Talking Tom & Friends	Talking Ginger, Talking Becca, Flo, Autumn Summers (seasons 3–5), Pilar, various voices	
2017	Ave Maria Bamford	Herself	Also writer
2019–present	What's Your Ailment?!	Herself	Also executive producer
2026	Game Changer	Herself	1 episode; "Last Talent Standing"
2026	Helluva Boss	Cassity	Voice; 1 episode
2026	Crowd Control	Herself	1 episode; "Trauma Heals"

=== Discography ===
- The Burning Bridges Tour (2003) [CD]
- How to WIN! (2007) [CD]
- Unwanted Thoughts Syndrome (2009) [CD]
- Plan B (2010) [DVD]
- The Special Special Special! (2012) [video download]
- Ask Me About My New God! (2013) [CD]
- 20% (2016) [CD]
- Maria Bamford: Old Baby (2017) [Netflix]
- Weakness Is the Brand (2020) [album/video]
- CROWD-PLEASER! (2023) [album]
- Local Act (2023) [video download]

=== Bibliography ===
- Sure, I'll Join Your Cult: A Memoir of Mental Illness and the Quest to Belong Anywhere (2023)

=== Podcasts ===
- Bonanas for Bonanza (2020)
- Conan O'Brien Needs A Friend (2023)
- Planet Money - Maria Bamford gets personal (about) finance (Oct 13, 2023)
