= Dylan Different =

Studio album by Ben Sidran
- Released: November 16, 2009
- Recorded: June 1st-4th 2009
- Studios: Alsace, France
- Genre: Smooth jazz
- Length: 46:01
- Label: Nardis
- Producer: Ben Sidran

Dylan Different is a smooth jazz album by keyboardist and jazz vocalist Ben Sidran, released in 2009. It is Sidran's thirty-sixth album, and his fourth release with his independent label Nardis Records.

== Background ==
Alsace in France

A tribute to Bob Dylan, the album consists of covers of his songs, reinterpreted as jazz. Sidran maintained the original lyrics, but introduced revised tempos, instruments and a large backing band.

The album was recorded between June 1st and June 4th, 2009. Eschewing a traditional recording studio, Sidran elected to record the album in an Alsatian farm house in the east of France, explaining that he wanted to introduce the same haunted, mysterious quality that he felt from Dylan's music. Several of the musicians were also European, including Rodolphe Burger, a French singer and musician; Marcello Giuliani, an Italian bassist; and Alberto Malo, a Spanish drummer.

== Track listing ==
All lyrics are written by Bob Dylan; all music is composed by Ben Sidran.

No.	Title	Length
1.	"Everything Is Broken" (from Oh Mercy, 1989)	3:25
2.	"Highway 61 Revisited" (from Highway 61 Revisited, 1965)	3:18
3.	"Tangled Up in Blue" (from Blood on the Tracks, 1975)	3:46
4.	"Gotta Serve Somebody" (from Slow Train Coming, 1979)	4:47
5.	"Rainy Day Women#12 & 35" (from Blonde on Blonde, 1966)	3:56
6.	"Ballad of a Thin Man" (from Highway 61 Revisited, 1965)	2:56
7.	"Maggie's Farm" (from Bringing It All Back Home, 1965)	4:58
8.	"Knockin' On Heaven's Door" (from Pat Garrett & Billy the Kid, 1973)	3:50
9.	"Subterranean Homesick Blues" (from Bringing It All Back Home, 1965)	3:39
10.	"On The Road Again" (from Bringing It All Back Home, 1965)	3:08
11.	"All I Really Want To Do" (from Another Side of Bob Dylan, 1964)	3:20
12.	"Blowin' in the Wind" (from The Freewheelin' Bob Dylan, 1963)	5:08

== Personnel ==
=== Musicians ===
- Ben Sidran – vocals, piano, Wulitizer, Hammond B3, Fender Rhodes
- Rodolphe Burger – guitar, vocal on "Blowin' in the Wind"
- Jorge Drexler – vocals on "Knockin' on Heaven's Door"
- Georgie Fame – vocals and organ on "Rainy Day Woman #12 & 35"
- Marcello Giuliani – acoustic bass, electric bass
- Amy Helm – background vocals
- Michael Leonhart – trumpet, flugelhorn
- Bob Malach – tenor saxophone, flute, bass clarinet
- Alberto Malo – drums, percussion
- Leo Sidran – horn arrangements, additional guitar, Hammond B3, piano, koto
- Leonor Watling & Luca – background vocals on "Knockin' on Heaven's Door"

== Reception ==
Professional ratings
Review scores
Source	Rating
AllMusic	4/5 stars

Writing for AllMusic, Thom Jurek praised Sidran's interpretation and style, "his requisite musicality, unaffected jazzman's cool, and streetwise yet elegant poetic imagination." He also praised the source material, commenting on Dylan's ability to write "folk songs that transcend their eras of origin in relevancy."

== See also ==
- List of songs written by Bob Dylan
- List of artists who have covered Bob Dylan songs
