= Brave New World (Steve Miller Band album) =

Studio album by Steve Miller Band
- Released: June 16, 1969
- Recorded: 1969
- Studios: Sound Recorders, Hollywood, California; Olympic, London
- Genres: Psychedelic rock; blues rock
- Length: 29:52
- Label: Capitol
- Producers: Glyn Johns; Steve Miller

Steve Miller Band chronology
Sailor (1968)	Brave New World (1969)	Your Saving Grace (1969)

Singles from Brave New World
- 1. "My Dark Hour / Song for Our Ancestors" Released: October 1973

Brave New World is the third studio album by American rock band Steve Miller Band, released in June 1969. It is the band's first album following the departure of founding members Boz Scaggs and Jim Peterman, with Ben Sidran replacing Peterman on keyboards. The album reached number 22 on the Billboard 200 album chart. In Colin Larkin's third edition of All Time Top 1000 Albums (2000) it was voted number 676.

Paul McCartney contributed to "My Dark Hour" (credited as "Paul Ramon"), providing backing vocals, drums, guitar and bass guitar. The song originated from what was intended to have been a Beatles recording session, which engineer Glyn Johns invited Miller to visit as a guest as Miller. When only McCartney came to the studio as planned, Johns suggested Miller and McCartney work together to take advantage of the time.

Professional ratings
Review scores
Source	Rating
AllMusic	4.5/5 stars
Rolling Stone	(favorable)
Encyclopedia of Popular Music	5/5 stars

== Track listing ==
Side One
No.	Title	Writer(s)	Length
1.	"Brave New World"	Steve Miller	3:27
2.	"Celebration Song"	Miller; Ben Sidran	2:33
3.	"Can't You Hear Your Daddy's Heartbeat"	Tim Davis	2:30
4.	"Got Love 'Cause You Need It"	Miller; Sidran	2:28
5.	"Kow Kow Calqulator"	Miller	4:28

Side Two
No.	Title	Writer(s)	Length
1.	"Seasons"	Miller; Sidran	3:50
2.	"Space Cowboy"	Miller; Sidran	4:55
3.	"LT's Midnight Dream"	Lonnie Turner	2:33
4.	"My Dark Hour"	Miller	3:07
Total length:			29:52

== Personnel ==
=== Steve Miller Band ===
- Steve Miller – guitar, harmonica, synthesizer, keyboards, vocals, producer
- Lonnie Turner – guitar, bass, vocals
- Tim Davis – drums, percussion, vibraphone, vocals
- Ben Sidran – keyboards, vibraphone

=== Additional personnel ===
- Nicky Hopkins – keyboards
- Paul McCartney (as "Paul Ramon") – bass, drums, guitar, vocals ("My Dark Hour")
- Glyn Johns – engineer, producer, guitar, percussion, vocals
- Iván Nagy – photography
