= Bohemia (Leo Sidran album) =

Studio album by Leo Sidran
- Released: June 1, 2004
- Label: Liquid 8

Bohemia is an album by Leo Sidran. It was released on June 1, 2004 on Liquid 8.

== Track listing ==
1. Jamboree
2. La Misma Luna
3. Deaf Ears
4. Tobacco Alinado
5. Not A Word
6. Born Again Today
7. Stolen Moments
8. Bombacha
9. Living On The Interest
10. De Hora En Hora
11. Walking On Sunshine
