= Children of the Future (album) =

Studio album by Steve Miller Band
- Released: May 1968
- Recorded: 29 January - March 1968
- Studios: Olympic, London
- Genres: Psychedelic rock; blues rock
- Length: 38:21
- Label: Capitol
- Producer: Glyn Johns

Steve Miller Band chronology
Children of the Future (1968)	Sailor (1968)

Children of the Future is the debut studio album by the Steve Miller Band, released in April 1968 by Capitol Records. Contributed by several writers, the songs on the album include a mixture of blues and psychedelic rock. The album was produced by British record producer-engineer Glyn Johns. It reached number 134 on the Billboard 200 album chart.

== Background ==
Steve Miller Band had formed in November 1966, shortly after Steve Miller moved to San Francisco, and quickly became fixtures on the ballroom scene; they eventually appeared at the Monterey International Pop Festival in June 1967. They attracted the attention of multiple record companies and eventually signed with Capitol Records in November 1967 for a then unprecedented $60,000 advance. The money allowed them to choose where they wanted to record, so Miller picked Olympic Studios in London and asked for engineer Glyn Johns. Before that, the group spent time during November and December 1967 at Columbus Recorders in San Francisco recording preparatory demo tapes where Miller experimented with electronic sounds, combining them with the group's blues-rock base. As keyboardist Jim Peterman recalled, "Steve was already working with pre-recorded sound tapes and electronic music in October/November ’67 and was listening to Stockhausen, John Cage and The Beatles...The rest of the band wasn’t really into it. It just really caught a hold of Steve. His direction then, right before we were getting ready to get that first album’s material together, the change in sound and style that we had, it was developing into the sound that was on the first record - Children of The Future." Some of the songs had been written earlier, when Miller was working as a janitor at a Texas music studio in the summer of 1966.

== Songs and recording ==
Children of the Future is the first of two Steve Miller Band albums to feature guitarist/vocalist Boz Scaggs before he embarked on a successful solo career. Recording sessions took place at Olympic Studios starting January 29, 1968 after the group had arrived to England by boat on the SS United States. The next four weeks were spent recording with Miller producing, but the sessions were haphazard until Johns threatened to quit unless he could help produce the album himself. Miller conceded and the bulk of the material was recorded smoothly over the final two weeks. Miller would later say of working with Glyn Johns:

We had to pretty much keep him off the record. Keep him from playing bass, keep him from playing rhythm guitar, from playing the tambourine. I argued with him all the time. I learned a lot from Glyn about making records. The difference between the English and the Americans was the Americans were all conservative, they didn’t like loud amplifiers or big drums or any of that stuff. They were into making pop records. When you went to London they had a Marshall stack, they wanted you to turn it up, they wanted it to sound like rock ’n’ roll. They had the microphone 15 feet away from the amplifier. There was a crazy guy at the console saying "Let’s see if we can make it sound badder". It was great. We got there and Glyn was all of that. I had a lot of arguments with him about too much echo on the records. I was into Otis Redding and the Stax sound, I liked a lot of dry presence and soul. We argued about the sound of the guitars, the sound of the record. We really argued about electronics. He didn’t like any electronic sound glosses, he thought that was all bullshit. I had to really force him to do that stuff and fight for it.

On February 26, 1968 the entire band and their entourage (except Miller himself) were involved in a drug bust at their London home, when a Scotland Yard dog smelled hash in a package addressed to the group. The group were fined and given a one year probation on narcotics charges, but were allowed to finish recording the album. Their work visas, however, were canceled which meant that a series of UK dates the group had planned to play over the next few weeks after recording had to also be canceled.

On the same day as the drug bust, Miller's childhood friend Ben Sidran arrived to work on the record. He ended up playing harpsichord on Boz Scaggs' "Baby's Callin' Me Home", a song Scaggs had written about his world travels which was recorded with only himself, Sidran and Johns in the studio. Although there was concern that the song wouldn't fit in with the rest of the album, Miller allowed it. The album was finished in mid-March, whereupon the group made a brief stopover in France before returning to America.

== Release and reception ==
Professional ratings
Review scores
Source	Rating
AllMusic	4.5/5 stars
Rolling Stone	(positive)
Encyclopedia of Popular Music	4/5 stars

Children of the Future was released in May 1968 with a front cover design by famed San Francisco poster artist Victor Moscoso but underperformed on the charts when it peaked at number 134. Reviews were positive: Rolling Stone described the first side, which plays as a single continuous track (subtitled Children of the Future), as being "constructed like Sgt Pepper, a coherent whole of individual pieces, with a dominant verbal theme (philosophical without pretentiousness)". Writing in Crawdaddy!, Peter Knobler called the album "a triple moment of experience, knowledge, inspiration". San Francisco Chronicle opined that "the album is beautifully recorded and there is a surprising sweetness to it which the Miller band never evidenced prior to its London visit. The tunes and performances are good and there are some interesting electronics employed and the band swings. The blues tracks are smoother than the band usually sounds but the whole thing is quite good, even if it is a little more British than the Miller band ordinarily is."

== Track listing ==
All tracks are written by Steve Miller, except where noted.

Side one
No.	Title	Writer(s)	Length
1.	"Children of the Future"		2:58
2.	"Pushed Me to It"		0:36
3.	"You've Got the Power"		0:55
4.	"In My First Mind"	Miller; Jim Peterman	7:31
5.	"The Beauty of Time Is That It's Snowing (Psychedelic B.B.)"		5:23

Side two
No.	Title	Writer(s)	Length
6.	"Baby's Callin' Me Home"	Boz Scaggs	3:24
7.	"Steppin' Stone"	Scaggs	3:02
8.	"Roll with It"		2:29
9.	"Junior Saw It Happen"	Jim Pulte	2:29
10.	"Fanny Mae"	Buster Brown	3:11
11.	"Key to the Highway"	Big Bill Broonzy; Charlie Segar	6:18
Total length:			38:21

== Personnel ==
- Steve Miller – guitar, vocals
- Boz Scaggs – guitar, vocals
- Lonnie Turner – bass guitar
- Jim Peterman – Hammond organ
- Tim Davis – drums

=== Additional personnel ===
- Ben Sidran – harpsichord ("Baby's Callin' Me Home")
