= Acacia cuspidifolia =

Wait-a-while

Scientific classification
- Kingdom: Plantae
- Clade: Embryophytes
- Clade: Tracheophytes
- Clade: Angiosperms
- Clade: Eudicots
- Clade: Rosids
- Order: Fabales
- Family: Fabaceae
- Subfamily: Caesalpinioideae
- Clade: Mimosoid clade
- Genus: Acacia
- Species: A. cuspidifolia

Binomial name
- Acacia cuspidifolia Maslin
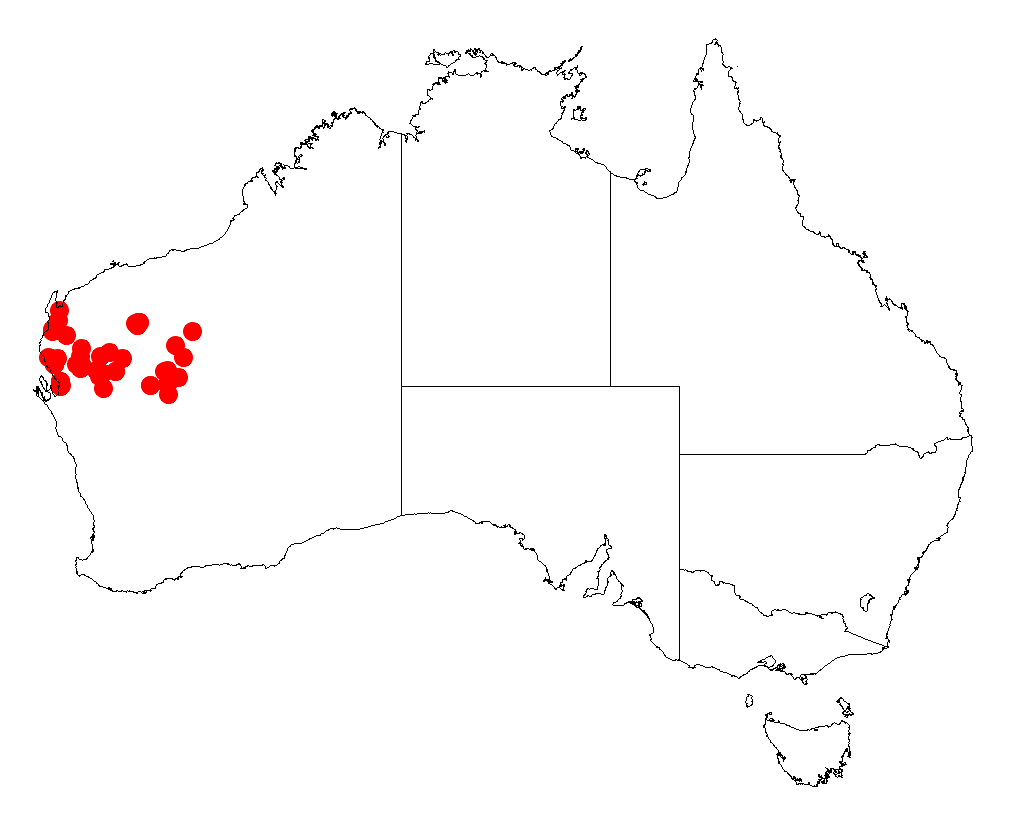
- Occurrence data from AVH

Synonyms
- Racosperma cuspidifolium (Maslin) Pedley

Species of legume

Acacia cuspidifolia, commonly known as wait-a-while or bohemia, is a species of flowering plant in the family Fabaceae and is endemic to the north of Western Australia. It is a dense, bushy, much-branched shrub or gnarled tree with narrowly oblong to linear phyllodes with a sharp point on the end, spherical heads of pale yellow flowers and narrowly oblong, papery pods.

== Description ==
Acacia cuspidifolia is a dense, bushy, much-branched shrub or gnarled tree that typically grows to a height of 3–7 m (9.8–23.0 ft). Its phyllodes are narrowly oblong to linear, mostly 30–60 mm (1.2–2.4 in) long and 2–5 mm (0.079–0.197 in) wide, sharply pointed, with a prominent midrib and a gland up to 5 mm (0.20 in) above the base of the phyllode. There are sometimes spiny stipules 2–4 mm (0.079–0.157 in) long and slightly curved at the base of the phyllodes. The flowers are borne in one or two spherical heads in axils on a peduncle 15–20 mm (0.59–0.79 in) long, each head with 23 to 32 pale yellow flowers. Flowering mainly occurs from October to December, and the pods are narrowly oblong, up to 90 mm (3.5 in) long, 10–20 mm (0.39–0.79 in) wide and papery. The seeds are widely elliptic to widely egg-shaped, 6–7.5 mm (0.24–0.30 in) long and brown.

== Taxonomy ==
Acacia cuspidifolia was first formally described in 1982 by Bruce Maslin in the journal Nuytsia, 2 km (1.2 mi) south of the Hill 4 East mine at Paraburdoo in 1980. The specific epithet (cuspidifolia) means 'pointed leaf', referring to the sharply pointed phyllodes.

== Distribution and habitat ==
Wait-a-while grows in clay or loam on open floodplains from Minilya Station, east to Mundiwindi and south to Ballythanna Hill and near Meekatharra, in the Carnarvon, Gascoyne, Murchison and Pilbara bioregions of northern Western Australia.

== Conservation status ==
Acacia cuspidifolia is listed as "not threatened" by the Government of Western Australia Department of Biodiversity, Conservation and Attractions.

== See also ==
- List of Acacia species
