= Tim Davis (musician) =

American drummer

- Born: September 20, 1943; Milwaukee
- Died: September 29, 1988 (aged 44)
- Occupation: Co-founder of the Steve Miller Band

Timothy Lawrence Davis (November 29, 1943 – September 20, 1988), was a drummer, singer and songwriter, who co-founded the Steve Miller Band.

== History ==
Davis was born in Milwaukee and raised in Janesville, Wisconsin. He played on the first five albums released by the Steve Miller Band and contributed lead and background vocals and songwriting. Davis left the band to work with others, such as Ben Sidran, and to commence a solo career. Shortly after his departure from Miller, Davis joined David Lindley in a band supporting Terry Reid, appearing at the Isle of Wight Festival in 1970.

Davis had a modest hit in 1972, "Buzzy Brown", written by fellow Wisconsin musician and Steve Miller Band co-founder James "Curley" Cooke. Davis continued an association with Steve Miller, contributing two songs, co-written with Miller, to the 1984 Steve Miller Band album, Italian X Rays.

Davis died in 1988 from complications from diabetes at the age of 44.

== Discography ==
=== Steve Miller Band ===
- 1968 Children of the Future
- 1968 Sailor
- 1969 Brave New World
- 1969 Your Saving Grace
- 1970 Number 5
- 1972 Anthology
- 1990 The Best of 1968-1973
- 1994 Box Set (3 CD compilation)
- 2003 Young Hearts

=== Solo ===
- 1972 Pipe Dream
- 1974 Take Me As I Am

=== Contributions to Others ===
- 1967 Chuck Berry, Live at the Fillmore Auditorium
- 1968 Jefferson Airplane, Crown of Creation
- 1971 Ben Sidran, I Lead A Life
- 1973 Ben Sidran, Puttin' In Time On Planet Earth

=== General Compilations ===
- 1994 Texas Music, Vol. 3: Garage Bands & Psychedelia (Rhino)
- 1997 The Monterey International Pop Festival, June 16-17-18, 1967 (Rhino); 4-CD set.
