= Born 2 B Blue =

Studio album by Steve Miller
- Released: September 1988
- Recorded: in Seattle, Minneapolis, Los Angeles and New York
- Genres: Easy listening, jazz
- Length: 42:22
- Label: Capitol
- Producer: Steve Miller

Steve Miller chronology
Living in the 20th Century (1986)	Born 2 B Blue (1988)	The Very Best of the Steve Miller Band (1991)

Born 2 B Blue is the debut solo album by Steve Miller, released in 1988 by Capitol Records, and his only album to not be released under the Steve Miller Band moniker. It consists primarily of jazz standards reinterpreted in a more modern context. It represented a departure from Miller's work with the Steve Miller Band. The album was Miller's final release for Capitol Records, after 20 years with the label.

== Critical reception ==
Professional ratings
Review scores
Source	Rating
AllMusic	3/5 stars
The Encyclopedia of Popular Music	3/5 stars
The Rolling Stone Album Guide	3/5 stars

The Philadelphia Inquirer called the album "perhaps the most anemic, far-removed expression of blues sentiment to surface in years".

== Track listing ==
No.	Title	Writer(s)	Length
1.	"Zip-a-Dee-Doo-Dah"	Allie Wrubel, Ray Gilbert	4:13
2.	"Ya Ya"	Lee Dorsey, Morris Levy, Clarence Lewis, Morgan Robinson	3:37
3.	"God Bless the Child"	Billie Holiday, Arthur Herzog Jr.	5:00
4.	"Filthy McNasty"	Horace Silver	2:50
5.	"Born to Be Blue"	Mel Tormé, Robert Wells	5:25
6.	"Mary Ann"	Ray Charles	4:49
7.	"Just a Little Bit"	Buster Brown, Ralph Bass, Fats Washington, John Thornton	4:04
8.	"When Sunny Gets Blue"	Marvin Fisher, Jack Segal	4:36
9.	"Willow Weep for Me"	Ann Ronell	5:12
10.	"Red Top"	Lionel Hampton, Ben Kynard	2:31

== Personnel ==
- Steve Miller – guitar, vocals
- Billy Peterson – bass guitar
- Ben Sidran – keyboards
- Gordy Knudtson – drums

Additional personnel

- Milt Jackson – vibraphone on "Born to be Blue"
- Phil Woods – alto saxophone on "When Sunny Gets Blue" & "Red Top"
- Bobby Malach – tenor saxophone on "Mary Ann," "God Bless the Child," "Filthy McNasty," & "Just a Little Bit"
- Ricky Peterson – all programming on "Zip-A-Dee-Doo-Dah," additional synthesizers on "Ya Ya" & "Just a Little Bit"
- Bruce Paulson – trombone on "God Bless the Child"
- Steve Faison – percussion on "Zip-A-Dee-Doo-Dah"
- Steve Wiese (engineer) – recorded and mixed at Creation Audio, Minneapolis

== Charts ==
Chart performance for Born 2 B Blue
Chart (1988)	Peak position
Canada Top Albums/CDs (RPM)	95
US Billboard 200	108
