= Sailor (Steve Miller Band album) =

Studio album by Steve Miller Band
- Released: October 1968
- Recorded: June and August 1968
- Studios: Wally Heider, Los Angeles
- Genre: Rock
- Length: 34:22
- Label: Capitol
- Producers: Steve Miller Band; Glyn Johns

Steve Miller Band chronology
Children of the Future (1968)	Sailor (1968)	Brave New World (1969)

Sailor is the second studio album by American rock band Steve Miller Band, released in October 1968 by Capitol Records. It was recorded in Los Angeles, California, and was produced by the band along with Glyn Johns. It was the last album to feature contributions from original members Boz Scaggs and Jim Peterman.

== Background ==
Steve Miller Band had signed to Capitol Records in 1967 for an unprecedented advance, but underperformed expectations when their debut album Children of the Future peaked at number 134 on the Billboard chart. However, the group continued to be popular in the Bay Area and began to tour overseas. For the next album, engineer Glyn Johns recalls that Miller phoned to say he had decided to change the name of the band to "Sailor" and wanted to create a concept album reflecting the new name. Johns was apprehensive of the idea but studio time was set aside for the sessions.

== Songs and recording ==
Sessions for Sailor were held at Wally Heider Studios in Los Angeles, where the group stayed at the Chateau Marmont. The recording was swifter than that of Children of the Future, beginning with a week of sessions in late June 1968 before taking a break and returning for another week in early August. During the first week Glyn Johns recalls:

"Steve arrived with a large roll of paper that he ceremoniously spread across the bed. He took a pencil and began drawing wavy lines along the length of the paper, explaining that this was his visual interpretation of what he wanted the album to be. I realized I was in trouble. I had become fond of Steve, and we had developed a really good working relationship. Thinking that I was at fault for not understanding, I changed the subject and told him of an idea that I'd had on the plane on the way over, which was to start the album with an instrumental with sound effects that could, with some considerable stretch of the imagination, suggest the returning to home port of a sailor."

Miller liked the idea and the next day the team recorded foghorn sounds at the San Francisco docks, before returning to the studio to complete what became the opening track "Song for Our Ancestors" by blending the group's vocals with a pitch-bended organ note. Sound effects of a dragster taking off were used for "Living In The USA", a track that had been performed live prior to the debut album and which was released as a single that September, where it climbed to number 94 and became a signature staple in the group's live shows for the remainder of its career; a 1974 rerelease saw it reach number 49. For "Dear Mary", Johns remembers Miller harmonizing with himself through extensive overdubbing. By the finish of recording, the idea of changing the band's name or making it a concept album had vanished.

The songs by Peterman and Scaggs were initially recorded without Miller's presence, as Peterman recalls "we felt stronger about playing it without him being there. You know, his being there would change our songs because of him wanting to direct. We were having fun just the four of us together and we weren’t having fun with Steve". Miller then overdubbed his parts to these songs later. This growing rift within the band came to a head in September, just prior to the album's release, when both Scaggs and Peterman quit the group.

== Release and reception ==
Professional ratings
Review scores
Source	Rating
AllMusic	4/5 stars
Rolling Stone	(positive)
Encyclopedia of Popular Music	5/5 stars

Sailor was released on October 7, 1968, less than five months after the debut, with front and back cover photography by Thomas Weir. It performed much better than its predecessor, reaching number 24 on the US Billboard 200 album chart and number 27 in Canada. The album was later reissued in 1971 under the name Living in the U.S.A., then again in 1982 under the original name Sailor.

Reception to the album was positive, with many critics and fans citing it as one of the group's finest efforts. In a retrospective review for AllMusic Amy Hanson writes "Sailor is a classic Miller recording and a must-have -- especially for the more contemporary fan, where it becomes an initiation into a past of mythic proportion". The New Rolling Stone Album Guide rated it three and a half stars while labeling it "steady, effortless rock and roll". The album was voted number 353 in the third edition of Colin Larkin's All Time Top 1000 Albums (2000).

== Track listing ==
Side One
No.	Title	Writer(s)	Length
1.	"Song for Our Ancestors"	Steve Miller	5:57
2.	"Dear Mary"	Miller	3:35
3.	"My Friend"	Tim Davis; Boz Scaggs	3:30
4.	"Living in the U.S.A."	Miller	4:03

Side Two
No.	Title	Writer(s)	Length
1.	"Quicksilver Girl"	Miller	2:40
2.	"Lucky Man"	Jim Peterman	3:08
3.	"Gangster of Love"	Johnny "Guitar" Watson	1:24
4.	"You're So Fine"	Jimmy Reed	2:51
5.	"Overdrive"	Scaggs	3:54
6.	"Dime-a-Dance Romance"	Scaggs	3:26
Total length:			34:22

== Personnel ==
=== Steve Miller Band ===
- Steve Miller – guitar, harmonica, lead vocals, producer
- Boz Scaggs – guitar, lead vocals, backing vocals
- Lonnie Turner – bass, backing vocals
- Tim Davis – drums, lead vocals, backing vocals
- Jim Peterman – keyboards, backing vocals

=== Additional personnel ===
- Glyn Johns – producer, engineer
- Thomas Weir – photography
