= Ben Sidran =

American keyboardist, label owner, and writer

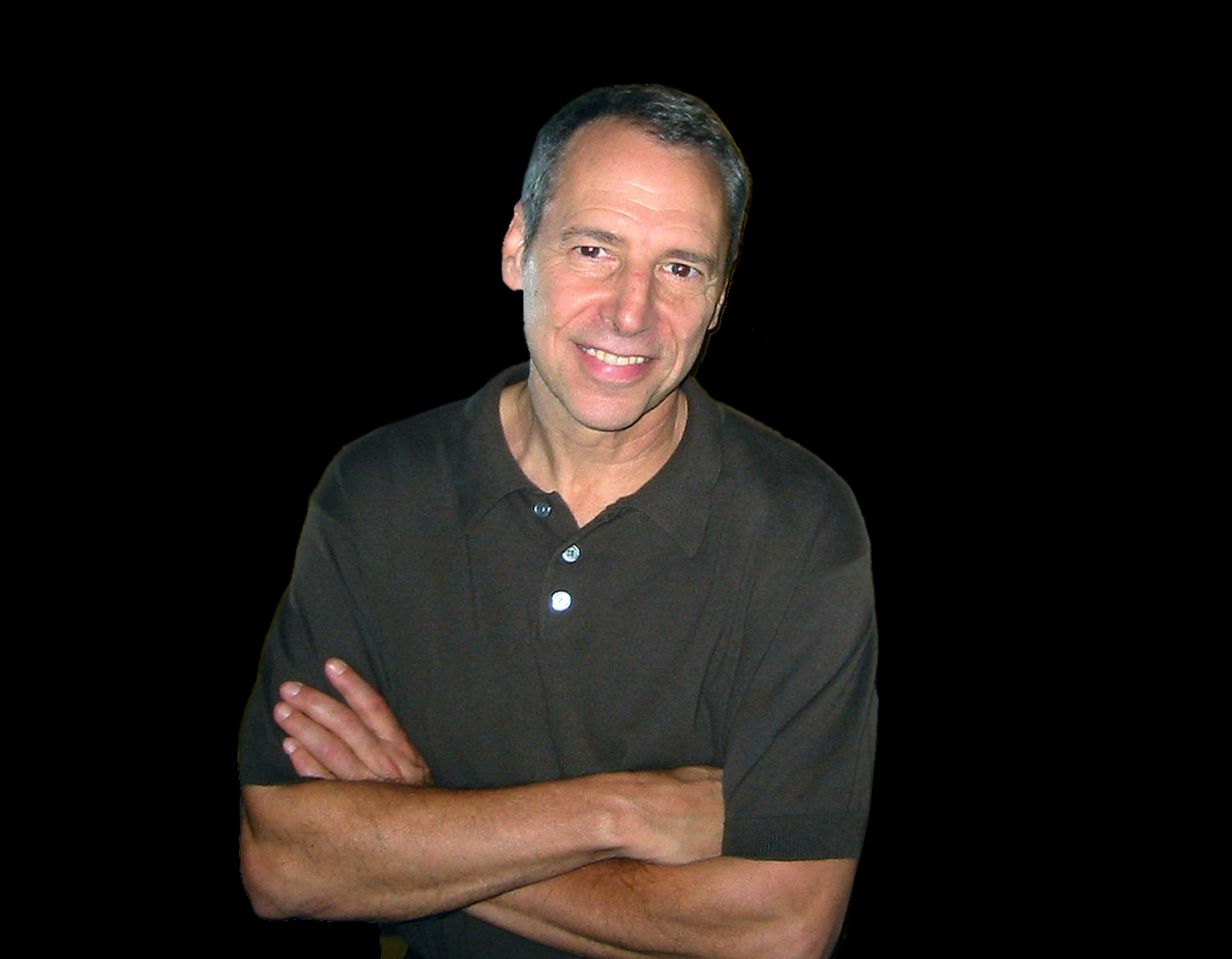
- At the Le Sunside jazz club in Paris, 2004

Background information
- Born: Ben Hirsh Sidran; August 14, 1943 (age 83); Chicago, Illinois, U.S.
- Genres: Jazz, rock
- Occupations: Musician, producer, label owner
- Instruments: Keyboards, vocals
- Years active: 1960s–present
- Labels: Blue Thumb, Arista, Windham Hill, Go Jazz, Nardis
- Formerly of: Steve Miller Band
- Website: bensidran.com

Ben Hirsh Sidran (born August 14, 1943) is an American jazz and rock keyboardist, producer, label owner, and music writer. Early in his career he was a member of the Steve Miller Band and is the father of Grammy-nominated musician, composer and performer Leo Sidran.

== Life and career ==
Sidran was born in Chicago, Illinois, United States. He was raised in Racine, Wisconsin, and attended the University of Wisconsin–Madison in 1961, where he became a member of The Ardells with Steve Miller and Boz Scaggs. When Miller and Scaggs left Wisconsin for the West Coast, Sidran stayed behind to earn a degree in English literature. After graduating in 1966, he enrolled at the University of Sussex, England, to pursue a PhD. While in England, he was a session musician for Eric Clapton, The Rolling Stones, Peter Frampton, and Charlie Watts.

Sidran joined Steve Miller as keyboardist and songwriter on recording projects, appearing on the albums Brave New World, Your Saving Grace, Number 5, and Recall the Beginning...A Journey from Eden. He produced Recall the Beginning and co-wrote the hit song "Space Cowboy." In 1988, he produced Miller's jazz album Born 2B Blue. He has also produced albums for Mose Allison, Van Morrison, Rickie Lee Jones, and Diana Ross.

Sidran returned to Madison, Wisconsin, in 1971 and has spent most of his life there. He taught courses at the university (on the business of music) and beginning in 1981 hosted jazz radio programs for NPR (including the Peabody Award-winning Jazz Alive series) and TV programs for VH1 (where his New Visions series in the early 1990s won the Ace Award). While hosting that series, Sidran frequently expressed his desire to "demystify the world of jazz; jazz musicians are just like the rest of us, only more so."

As a musician and a producer he has released over 35 solo recordings.

His written works include the book Black Talk on the sociology of black music in America; the memoir A Life in the Music, published in 2003 and detailing his musical career;Talking Jazz, a collection of his historic interviews with jazz musicians; There Was a Fire: Jews, Music and the American Dream, a cultural history of the Jewish contribution to American popular music during the 20th century and a finalist for the 2012 National Jewish Book Award; and The Ballad of Tommy LiPuma, a biography of the record producer Tommy LiPuma.

His 24-CD box set Talking Jazz includes an 80-page booklet with essays from writers, critics and musicians, classic photos from Lee Tanner, and 24 compact discs featuring conversations with 60 jazz musicians, recorded during a five-year period for Sidran's award-winning NPR program Sidran on Record. The 24 CDs orchestrated by Sidran document the speaking voice of jazz musicians, including Miles Davis, Art Blakey, and others.

Sidran has been referred to by the Chicago Sun Times as a "Renaissance man cast adrift in a modern world" and by The Times as "the first existential jazz rapper," in reference to his commentary while playing music.

== Discography ==
=== As leader ===
- Feel Your Groove (Capitol, 1970)
- I Lead a Life (Blue Thumb, 1971)
- Puttin' in Time on Planet Earth (Blue Thumb, 1972)
- Don't Let Go (Blue Thumb, 1974)
- Free in America (Arista, 1975)
- The Doctor Is in (Arista, 1977)
- A Little Kiss in the Night (Arista, 1978)
- Live at Montreux (Arista, 1978)
- The Cat and the Hat (Horizon/A&M, 1979)
- Old Songs for the New Depression [aka New Wave Bebop] (Antilles, 1981)
- Bop City (Antilles, 1982)
- Get to the Point (Baybridge, 1983)
- On the Cool Side (Magenta/Windham Hill, 1985)
- On the Live Side (Magenta/Windham Hill, 1986)
- Too Hot to Touch (Windham Hill, 1988)
- Have You Met... Barcelona? (Orange Blue, 1989)
- Cool Paradise (Go Jazz, 1990)
- Life's a Lesson (Go Jazz, 1993)
- Mr. P's Shuffle (Go Jazz, 1995)
- Live at the Celebrity Lounge (Go Jazz, 1997)
- The Concert for Garcia Lorca (Go Jazz, 1998)
- Walk Pretty: The Songs of Alec Wilder (Go Jazz, 2002)
- Nick's Bump (Go Jazz, 2003; Nardis, 2004)
- Live à FIP (Nardis, 2004 [2005])
- Bumpin' at the Sunside (Nardis, 2005)
- Cien Noches (One Hundred Nights at the Cafe) (Nardis, 2008)
- Dylan Different (Nardis, 2009)
- Don't Cry For No Hipster (Nardis, 2012)
- Blue Camus (Nardis, 2014)
- Picture Him Happy (Nardis, 2017)
- Swing State (Nardis, 2022)
- Rainmaker (Nardis, 2024)
- Are We There Yet (Nardis, 2025)

=== As sideman ===
With the Steve Miller Band

- Children of the Future (Capitol, 1968) (one track)
- Brave New World (Capitol, 1969)
- Your Saving Grace (Capitol, 1969) (one track)
- Number 5 (Capitol, 1970) (one track)
- Recall the Beginning...A Journey from Eden (Capitol, 1972)
- Born 2 B Blue (Capitol, 1988)
- Wide River (Polydor, 1993)

With others

- Gene Clark, White Light (A&M, 1971)
- Clementine, Clementine & Ben Sidran (Sony, 2011)
- Richie Cole, Popbop (Milestone, 1987)
- Richie Cole, Signature (Milestone, 1988)
- Jesse Davis, Jesse Davis (Atco, 1970)
- Tim Davis, Take Me As I Am (Metromedia, 1972)
- Jorge Drexler, Eco2 (Gasa, 2005)
- Jorge Drexler, Amar La Trama (WEA, 2010)
- Georgie Fame, Cool Cat Blues (Go Jazz, 1991)
- Georgie Fame, The Blues and Me (Go Jazz, 1992)
- Jon Hendricks, Tell Me the Truth (Arista, 1975)
- Joy and the Boy, Paradise (Go Jazz, 2001)
- Marlango, Life in the Treehouse (Universal, 2010)
- Aya Matsuura, Click You Link Me (Zetima, 2010)
- Sarah Jane Morris, Sarah Jane Morris (Jive, 1989)
- Van Morrison, Tell Me Something - The songs of Mose Allison (Verve, 1996)
- Paul Pena, New Train (Hybrid, 2000)
- Bob Rockwell, Bob's Ben Webster (Stunt, 2004)
- Gustavo Santaolalla, The Motorcycle Diaries (Edge Music, 2004)
- Boz Scaggs, Moments (Columbia, 1971)
- Leo Sidran, L. Sid (Go Pop, 1999)
- Phil Upchurch, Darkness, Darkness (Blue Thumb, 1972)
- Phil Upchurch, Whatever Happened to the Blues (Go Jazz, 1992)
