= Nardis Records =

American jazz record label

Nardis Music
- Parent company: Liquid8
- Founded: 2003
- Founder: Ben Sidran, Leo Sidran
- Distributor(s): Navarre
- Genre: Jazz, vocal jazz, smooth jazz
- Country of origin: U.S.
- Official website: www.nardismusic.com

Nardis Music is a jazz record label formed in 2003 by Ben Sidran and his son Leo.

It is a subsidiary of Liquid8. It has a compilation series called Nardis Music Presents, which features songs and artists from Nardis and Sidran's GoJazz label. Nardis is marketed by Liquid8 Records and is distributed in the U.S. by Navarre.

The Nardis Music logo is "Man in Balance", a sketch drawn by Miles Davis and given to Ben Sidran in 1986. The name "Nardis" comes from a jazz tune most often attributed to Davis but made famous by Bill Evans. It's also "Sidran" spelled backwards.

== See also ==
- List of record labels
