= 2008 in downloadable songs for the Rock Band series =

- Songs released: 341
- Packs released: 35
- Albums released: 9

The Rock Band series of music video games supports downloadable songs for the Xbox 360, PlayStation 3, and Wii versions through the consoles' respective online services. Users can download songs on a track-by-track basis, with many of the tracks also offered as part of a "song pack" or complete album at a discounted rate. These packs are available for the Wii only on Rock Band 3. Most downloadable songs are playable within every game mode, including the Band World Tour career mode. All downloadable songs released before October 26, 2010 are cross-compatible between Rock Band, Rock Band 2 and Rock Band 3, while those after only work with Rock Band 3. Certain songs deemed "suitable for all ages" by Harmonix are also available for use in Lego Rock Band.

The Wii version of Rock Band does not support downloadable content, but Rock Band 2 and Rock Band 3 do, with DLC first made available in January 2009. Songs from the back catalogue of downloadable content were released for the Wii weekly in an effort by Harmonix to provide Wii players with every previously available song.

Following the release of Rock Band 4 for the PlayStation 4 and Xbox One, all previously purchased downloadable content for Rock Band 3 and earlier is forward compatible (with the exception of any downloadable content purchased for The Beatles: Rock Band) within the same system family at no additional cost.

Over 300 songs were released for Rock Band in 2008, including 9 full albums. Screaming for Vengeance by Judas Priest was the first available Rock Band album, released on April 22. The self-titled debut album by The Cars and Doolittle by Pixies were released in the succeeding months. Though developer Harmonix had previously announced that the album Who's Next by The Who would be among the first downloadable albums for Rock Band, this never came to fruition. Instead, a 12-song compilation pack titled "The Best of the Who (Rock Band Edition)" was released on July 15.

== List of songs released in 2008 ==
The following songs have been released for the Rock Band games in the year 2008. All songs available in packs are also available as individual song downloads on the same date, unless otherwise noted. Dates listed are the initial release of songs on Xbox Live. Starting May 20, 2008, all downloadable songs are available in both the North American and European markets, unless noted.

Some songs released before Rock Band 3 have been retrofitted to include Rock Band 3 features, including backing vocals, and the ability to buy an additional pack for Pro Guitar/Bass charts without having to buy the "RB3 Version" of the song. Certain songs have been marked "family friendly" by Harmonix; such songs released before Rock Band 3's launch on October 26, 2010 can be played in Lego Rock Band.

Starting October 26 (with The Doors), all new songs are only playable in Rock Band 3, due to a change in the file format. All songs released via downloadable content are playable in Rock Band 3, and support its new Pro Drum mode. Most songs released for Rock Band 3 include core features for keyboards, Pro Keyboards, and backing vocals in the core song, where they are appropriate. Additionally, some of these songs features charts for Pro Guitar and Bass that can also be purchased.

Song title	Artist	Year	Genre	Single / Pack name	Release date	Family Friendly	Additional Rock Band 3 Features
"Gimme Three Steps"	Lynyrd Skynyrd	1973	Southern Rock	Single	Jan 1, 2008	Yes	None
"Hard to Handle" (Cover Version) (Note: Track uses a cover version of the song, rather than a master recording.)	The Black Crowes	1990	Southern Rock	Single	Jan 1, 2008	Yes	None
"Limelight" (Cover Version) (Note: Song is no longer available for purchase.) (Note: Song is not available for the Wii platform.)	Rush	1981	Prog	Single	Jan 1, 2008	Yes	None
"Die, All Right!"	The Hives	2000	Punk	Single	Jan 8, 2008	No	None
"Interstate Love Song"	Stone Temple Pilots	1994	Alternative	Single	Jan 8, 2008	Yes	None
"The Number of the Beast" (Cover Version)	Iron Maiden	1982	Metal	Single	Jan 8, 2008	No	None
"Action" (Cover Version)	Sweet	1976	Glam	Single	Jan 15, 2008	No	None
"Last Train to Clarksville" (Cover Version)"	The Monkees	1966	Pop-Rock	Single	Jan 15, 2008	Yes	None
"All the Small Things"	Blink-182	1999	Punk	Single	Jan 15, 2008	Yes	None
"Don't Look Back in Anger"	Oasis	1995	Rock	Oasis 01	Jan 22, 2008	Yes	None
"Live Forever"	Oasis	1994	Rock	Oasis 01	Jan 22, 2008	Yes	None
"Wonderwall"	Oasis	1995	Rock	Oasis 01	Jan 22, 2008	Yes	None
"Siva"	Smashing Pumpkins	1991	Alternative	Single	Jan 29, 2008	Yes	None
"Working Man" (Cover Version)	Rush	1974	Prog	Single	Jan 29, 2008	No	None
"Ten Speed (Of God's Blood and Burial)" (Cover Version)	Coheed and Cambria	2005	Prog	Single	Jan 29, 2008	No	None
"Roam"	The B-52's	1989	New Wave	Single	Feb 5, 2008	Yes	None
"We Care a Lot"	Faith No More	1987	Rock	Single	Feb 5, 2008	No	None
"Calling Dr. Love"	Kiss	1976	Classic Rock	Single	Feb 5, 2008	No	None
"Complete Control"	The Clash	1977	Punk	(Arguably) Punk 02	Feb 11, 2008	No	None
"Truth Hits Everybody"	The Police	1978	Rock	(Arguably) Punk 02	Feb 11, 2008	No	None
"Teenage Lobotomy"	Ramones	1977	Punk	(Arguably) Punk 02	Feb 11, 2008	Yes	None
"Sex Type Thing"	Stone Temple Pilots	1992	Alternative	Single	Feb 19, 2008	No	None
"El Scorcho"	Weezer	1996	Alternative	Single	Feb 19, 2008	No	None
"Why Do You Love Me"	Garbage	2005	Alternative	Single	Feb 19, 2008	No	None
"March of the Pigs"	Nine Inch Nails	1994	Rock	Nine Inch Nails 01	Feb 26, 2008	No	None
"The Collector"	Nine Inch Nails	2005	Rock	Nine Inch Nails 01	Feb 26, 2008	No	None
"The Perfect Drug"	Nine Inch Nails	1997	Rock	Nine Inch Nails 01	Feb 26, 2008	No	None
"China Cat Sunflower"	Grateful Dead	1969	Classic Rock	Grateful Dead 01	Mar 4, 2008	Yes	None
"Casey Jones"	Grateful Dead	1970	Classic Rock	Grateful Dead 01	Mar 4, 2008	No	None
"Sugar Magnolia"	Grateful Dead	1970	Classic Rock	Grateful Dead 01	Mar 4, 2008	Yes	None
"Truckin'"	Grateful Dead	1970	Classic Rock	Grateful Dead 01	Mar 4, 2008	No	None
"Franklin's Tower"	Grateful Dead	1975	Classic Rock	Grateful Dead 01	Mar 4, 2008	No	None
"I Need a Miracle"	Grateful Dead	1978	Classic Rock	Grateful Dead 01	Mar 4, 2008	Yes	None
"Crushcrushcrush"	Paramore	2007	Pop-Rock	Single	Mar 11, 2008	Yes	None
"Beethoven's C***"	Serj Tankian	2007	Nu-Metal	Single	Mar 11, 2008	No	None
"Shockwave"	Black Tide	2008	Metal	Single	Mar 11, 2008	No	None
"Blinded by Fear"	At the Gates	1995	Metal	Earache Thrash 01	Mar 18, 2008	No	None
"D.O.A."	The Haunted	2003	Metal	Earache Thrash 01	Mar 18, 2008	No	None
"Thrasher"	Evile	2007	Metal	Earache Thrash 01	Mar 18, 2008	No	None
"Peace of Mind"	Boston	1976	Classic Rock	Boston 01	Mar 25, 2008	Yes	None
"More Than a Feeling"	Boston	1976	Classic Rock	Boston 01	Mar 25, 2008	Yes	Pro Guitar/Bass
"Smokin'"	Boston	1976	Classic Rock	Boston 01	Mar 25, 2008	No	None
"Rock and Roll Band"	Boston	1976	Classic Rock	Boston 01	Mar 25, 2008	Yes	None
"Something About You"	Boston	1976	Classic Rock	Boston 01	Mar 25, 2008	Yes	None
"Hitch a Ride"	Boston	1976	Classic Rock	Boston 01	Mar 25, 2008	Yes	None
"Still Alive" (Note: Song is available at no cost.)	GLaDOS	2007	Novelty	Single	Apr 1, 2008	Yes	None
"Rock Rebellion" (Note: Song costs US$0.99 (80 MSP/100 Wii Points).)	Bang Camaro	2007	Rock	Harmonix 01	Apr 8, 2008	Yes	None
"Shake"	Count Zero	2008	Rock	Harmonix 01	Apr 8, 2008	No	None
"Sprode"	Freezepop	2003	Pop/Dance/Electronic	Harmonix 01	Apr 8, 2008	Yes	None
"Simple Man"	Lynyrd Skynyrd	1973	Southern Rock	Classic Rock 01	Apr 15, 2008	Yes	Pro Guitar/Bass
"Message in a Bottle"	The Police	1979	Rock	Classic Rock 01	Apr 15, 2008	Yes	None
"Call Me"	Blondie	1981	New Wave	Classic Rock 01	Apr 15, 2008	Yes	None
"Saints of Los Angeles"	Mötley Crüe	2008	Glam	Single	Apr 15, 2008	No	None
"The Hellion/Electric Eye"	Judas Priest	1982	Metal	Screaming for Vengeance	Apr 22, 2008	No	None
"Riding on the Wind"	Judas Priest	1982	Metal	Screaming for Vengeance	Apr 22, 2008	No	None
"Bloodstone"	Judas Priest	1982	Metal	Screaming for Vengeance	Apr 22, 2008	Yes	None
"(Take These) Chains"	Judas Priest	1982	Metal	Screaming for Vengeance	Apr 22, 2008	Yes	None
"Pain and Pleasure"	Judas Priest	1982	Metal	Screaming for Vengeance	Apr 22, 2008	No	None
"Screaming for Vengeance"	Judas Priest	1982	Metal	Screaming for Vengeance	Apr 22, 2008	No	None
"You've Got Another Thing Comin'"	Judas Priest	1982	Metal	Screaming for Vengeance	Apr 22, 2008	No	None
"Fever"	Judas Priest	1982	Metal	Screaming for Vengeance	Apr 22, 2008	No	None
"Devil's Child"	Judas Priest	1982	Metal	Screaming for Vengeance	Apr 22, 2008	No	None
"Red Tandy"	The Mother Hips	2005	Rock	Single	Apr 29, 2008	Yes	None
"Time-Sick Son of a Grizzly Bear"	The Mother Hips	2007	Rock	Single	Apr 29, 2008	Yes	None
"Zero"	Smashing Pumpkins	1995	Alternative	Single	Apr 29, 2008	No	None
"This Ain't a Scene, It's an Arms Race"	Fall Out Boy	2007	Pop-Rock	Scene 01	May 6, 2008	No	None
"Date with the Night"	Yeah Yeah Yeahs	2003	Indie Rock	Scene 01	May 6, 2008	No	None
"It Hurts"	Angels & Airwaves	2006	Alternative	Scene 01	May 6, 2008	No	None
"Hanging on the Telephone"	Blondie	1978	New Wave	Single	May 13, 2008	Yes	None
"Train in Vain (Stand by Me)"	The Clash	1979	Punk	Single	May 13, 2008	Yes	None
"Kool Thing"	Sonic Youth	1990	Alternative	Single	May 13, 2008	No	None
"Beetlebum" (Cover Version)	Blur	1997	Alternative	Single	May 20, 2008	No	None
"Countdown to Insanity"	H-Blockx	2007	Rock	Single	May 20, 2008	No	None
"Hier Kommt Alex"	Die Toten Hosen	1988	Punk	Single	May 20, 2008	No	None
"Hysteria"	Muse	2003	Alternative	Single	May 20, 2008	Yes	None
"Manu Chao"	Les Wampas	2003	Punk	Single	May 20, 2008	No	None
"Monsoon"	Tokio Hotel	2005	Pop-Rock	Single	May 20, 2008	Yes	None
"New Wave"	Pleymo	2002	Metal	Single	May 20, 2008	No	None
"Perfekte Welle"	Juli	2004	Rock	Single	May 20, 2008	No	None
"Rock 'n' Roll Star"	Oasis	1994	Rock	Single	May 20, 2008	Yes	None
"Good Times Roll"	The Cars	1978	New Wave	The Cars	May 27, 2008	Yes	None
"My Best Friend's Girl"	The Cars	1978	New Wave	The Cars	May 27, 2008	Yes	None
"Just What I Needed"	The Cars	1978	New Wave	The Cars	May 27, 2008	Yes	None
"I'm in Touch with Your World"	The Cars	1978	New Wave	The Cars	May 27, 2008	Yes	None
"Don't Cha Stop"	The Cars	1978	New Wave	The Cars	May 27, 2008	No	None
"You're All I've Got Tonight"	The Cars	1978	New Wave	The Cars	May 27, 2008	Yes	None
"Bye Bye Love"	The Cars	1978	New Wave	The Cars	May 27, 2008	Yes	None
"Moving in Stereo"	The Cars	1978	New Wave	The Cars	May 27, 2008	Yes	None
"All Mixed Up"	The Cars	1978	New Wave	The Cars	May 27, 2008	Yes	None
"Indestructible"	Disturbed	2008	Nu-Metal	Disturbed 01	Jun 3, 2008	No	None
"Inside the Fire"	Disturbed	2008	Nu-Metal	Disturbed 01	Jun 3, 2008	No	None
"Perfect Insanity"	Disturbed	2008	Nu-Metal	Disturbed 01	Jun 3, 2008	No	None
"Cheeseburger in Paradise" (Rock Band Re-Record)	Jimmy Buffett	1978	Rock	Jimmy Buffett 01	Jun 3, 2008	No	None
"Margaritaville" (Rock Band Re-Record)	Jimmy Buffett	1977	Rock	Jimmy Buffett 01	Jun 3, 2008	No	None
"Volcano" (Rock Band Re-Record)	Jimmy Buffett	1979	Rock	Jimmy Buffett 01	Jun 3, 2008	No	None
"Moving to Seattle"	The Material	2007	Alternative	MTV2 01	Jun 10, 2008	Yes	None
"A Clean Shot"	The Myriad	2008	Alternative	MTV2 01	Jun 10, 2008	No	None
"Bullets & Guns"	Them Terribles	2007	Alternative	MTV2 01	Jun 10, 2008	No	None
"Girls Who Play Guitars"	Maxïmo Park	2007	Pop-Rock	Single	Jun 10, 2008	No	None
"Critical Acclaim"	Avenged Sevenfold	2007	Metal	Single	Jun 17, 2008	No	None
"Afterlife"	Avenged Sevenfold	2007	Metal	Single	Jun 17, 2008	No	None
"Hammerhead"	The Offspring	2008	Punk	Single	Jun 17, 2008	No	None
"Rock n' Roll Dream"	Crooked X	2008	Rock	Single	Jun 17, 2008	Yes	None
"Debaser"	Pixies	1989	Alternative	Doolittle	Jun 24, 2008	No	None
"Tame"	Pixies	1989	Alternative	Doolittle	Jun 24, 2008	Yes	None
"I Bleed"	Pixies	1989	Alternative	Doolittle	Jun 24, 2008	No	None
"Here Comes Your Man"	Pixies	1989	Alternative	Doolittle	Jun 24, 2008	Yes	None
"Dead"	Pixies	1989	Alternative	Doolittle	Jun 24, 2008	No	None
"Monkey Gone to Heaven"	Pixies	1989	Alternative	Doolittle	Jun 24, 2008	No	None
"Mr. Grieves"	Pixies	1989	Alternative	Doolittle	Jun 24, 2008	Yes	None
"Crackity Jones"	Pixies	1989	Alternative	Doolittle	Jun 24, 2008	Yes	None
"La La Love You"	Pixies	1989	Alternative	Doolittle	Jun 24, 2008	Yes	None
"No. 13 Baby"	Pixies	1989	Alternative	Doolittle	Jun 24, 2008	No	None
"There Goes My Gun"	Pixies	1989	Alternative	Doolittle	Jun 24, 2008	Yes	None
"Hey"	Pixies	1989	Alternative	Doolittle	Jun 24, 2008	No	None
"Silver"	Pixies	1989	Alternative	Doolittle	Jun 24, 2008	Yes	None
"Gouge Away"	Pixies	1989	Alternative	Doolittle	Jun 24, 2008	No	None
"Dreamin'"	Weezer	2008	Alternative	Weezer 01	Jun 24, 2008	Yes	None
"The Greatest Man That Ever Lived"	Weezer	2008	Alternative	Weezer 01	Jun 24, 2008	No	None
"Troublemaker"	Weezer	2008	Alternative	Weezer 01	Jun 24, 2008	No	None
"Down at the Whisky"	Mötley Crüe	2008	Glam	Crüe Fest 01	Jul 1, 2008	No	None
"Time Is Running Out"	Papa Roach	2006	Nu-Metal	Crüe Fest 01	Jul 1, 2008	Yes	None
"Who's Going Home with You Tonight?"	Trapt	2008	Nu-Metal	Crüe Fest 01	Jul 1, 2008	Yes	None
"Promised Land"	Vesuvius	2008	Rock	Single	Jul 1, 2008	No	None
"Snow ((Hey Oh))"	Red Hot Chili Peppers	2006	Alternative	Single	Jul 8, 2008	No	None
"Tell Me Baby"	Red Hot Chili Peppers	2006	Alternative	Single	Jul 8, 2008	No	None
"Closer to the Heart"	Rush	1977	Prog	Single	Jul 8, 2008	Yes	None
"Working Man" (Vault Edition)	Rush	1974	Prog	Single	Jul 8, 2008	No	None
"Amazing Journey"	The Who	1969	Classic Rock	The Best of The Who (Rock Band Edition)	Jul 15, 2008	Yes	None
"Baba O'Riley"	The Who	1971	Classic Rock	The Best of The Who (Rock Band Edition)	Jul 15, 2008	Yes	None
"Behind Blue Eyes"	The Who	1971	Classic Rock	The Best of The Who (Rock Band Edition)	Jul 15, 2008	Yes	None
"Eminence Front"	The Who	1982	Classic Rock	The Best of The Who (Rock Band Edition)	Jul 15, 2008	Yes	None
"Going Mobile"	The Who	1971	Classic Rock	The Best of The Who (Rock Band Edition)	Jul 15, 2008	Yes	None
"Leaving Here"	The Who	1965	Classic Rock	The Best of The Who (Rock Band Edition)	Jul 15, 2008	Yes	None
"My Generation" (Live at Leeds)	The Who	1970	Classic Rock	The Best of The Who (Rock Band Edition)	Jul 15, 2008	Yes	None
"Real Good Looking Boy"	The Who	2004	Classic Rock	The Best of The Who (Rock Band Edition)	Jul 15, 2008	No	None
"Sea and Sand"	The Who	1973	Classic Rock	The Best of The Who (Rock Band Edition)	Jul 15, 2008	No	None
"Summertime Blues" (Live at Leeds)	The Who	1970	Classic Rock	The Best of The Who (Rock Band Edition)	Jul 15, 2008	Yes	None
"Who Are You"	The Who	1978	Classic Rock	The Best of The Who (Rock Band Edition)	Jul 15, 2008	No	None
"Young Man Blues" (Live at Leeds)	The Who	1970	Classic Rock	The Best of The Who (Rock Band Edition)	Jul 15, 2008	No	None
"Burn"	Nine Inch Nails	1994	Rock	Nine Inch Nails 02	Jul 22, 2008	No	None
"Capital G"	Nine Inch Nails	2007	Rock	Nine Inch Nails 02	Jul 22, 2008	No	None
"Last"	Nine Inch Nails	1992	Rock	Nine Inch Nails 02	Jul 22, 2008	No	None
"Devour"	Shinedown	2008	Nu-Metal	Single	Jul 22, 2008	Yes	None
"Junkies for Fame"	Shinedown	2008	Nu-Metal	Single	Jul 22, 2008	No	None
"They Say"	Scars on Broadway	2008	Rock	Single	Jul 29, 2008	No	None
"This Is It"	Staind	2008	Nu-Metal	Single	Jul 29, 2008	Yes	None
"Electric Crown"	Testament	1992	Metal	Single	Jul 29, 2008	Yes	None
"Yomp"	Thenewno2	2008	Pop-Rock	Single	Jul 29, 2008	Yes	None
"Toxicity"	System of a Down	2001	Nu-Metal	Single	Aug 5, 2008	Yes	None
"B.Y.O.B."	System of a Down	2005	Nu-Metal	Single	Aug 5, 2008	No	None
"Face Down in the Dirt"	Mötley Crüe	2008	Glam	Crüe Fest 02	Aug 5, 2008	No	None
"Rescue Me"	Buckcherry	2008	Rock	Crüe Fest 02	Aug 5, 2008	Yes	None
"Life Is Beautiful"	Sixx:A.M.	2007	Rock	Crüe Fest 02	Aug 5, 2008	No	None
"Aesthetics of Hate"	Machine Head	2007	Metal	Roadrunner Records 01	Aug 12, 2008	No	None
"Clouds Over California"	DevilDriver	2007	Metal	Roadrunner Records 01	Aug 12, 2008	No	None
"Constant Motion"	Dream Theater	2007	Metal	Roadrunner Records 01	Aug 12, 2008	Yes	None
"My Curse"	Killswitch Engage	2006	Metal	Roadrunner Records 01	Aug 12, 2008	Yes	None
"Sleepwalker"	Megadeth	2007	Metal	Roadrunner Records 01	Aug 12, 2008	No	None
"Runnin' Wild"	Airbourne	2007	Rock	Single	Aug 12, 2008	No	None
"Girl U Want (Rock Band Re-Record)"	Devo	1980	New Wave	Single	Aug 19, 2008	Yes	None
"Through Being Cool (Rock Band Re-Record)"	Devo	1981	New Wave	Single	Aug 19, 2008	Yes	None
"Rio"	Duran Duran	1982	New Wave	Single	Aug 19, 2008	Yes	None
"Girls on Film"	Duran Duran	1981	New Wave	Single	Aug 19, 2008	Yes	None
"Get Your Rock On"	The Janitors	2008	Pop-Rock	Single	Aug 19, 2008	Yes	None
"All Over Again"	Locksley	2007	Pop-Rock	Locksley 01	Aug 28, 2008	Yes	None
"She Does"	Locksley	2007	Pop-Rock	Locksley 01	Aug 28, 2008	Yes	None
"Don't Make Me Wait"	Locksley	2007	Pop-Rock	Locksley 01	Aug 28, 2008	Yes	None
"Skullcrusher Mountain"	Jonathan Coulton	2004	Pop-Rock	The PAX 2008 Collection	Sep 2, 2008	Yes	None
"Livin' at the Corner of Dude & Catastrophe"	MC Frontalot feat. Brad Sucks	2007	Hip-Hop/Rap	The PAX 2008 Collection	Sep 2, 2008	No	None
"Shhh...."	The Darkest of the Hillside Thickets	2008	Rock	The PAX 2008 Collection	Sep 2, 2008	No	None
"This Calling"	All That Remains	2006	Metal	All That Remains 01	Sep 9, 2008	Yes	None
"Chiron"	All That Remains	2008	Metal	All That Remains 01	Sep 9, 2008	Yes	None
"Two Weeks"	All That Remains	2008	Metal	All That Remains 01	Sep 9, 2008	Yes	None
"Charlene (I'm Right Behind You)"	Stephen and the Colberts	1986	Pop-Rock	Single	Sep 11, 2008	Yes	None
"One of THOSE Nights"	The Cab	2008	Pop-Rock	Rock Band Live 2008 Tour 01	Sep 16, 2008	Yes	None
"Hands Down"	Dashboard Confessional	2003	Emo	Rock Band Live 2008 Tour 01	Sep 16, 2008	No	None
"She's a Handsome Woman"	Panic! at the Disco	2008	Emo	Rock Band Live 2008 Tour 01	Sep 16, 2008	Yes	None
"Natural Disaster"	Plain White T's	2008	Pop-Rock	Rock Band Live 2008 Tour 01	Sep 16, 2008	No	None
"Wake Up Dead"	Megadeth	1986	Metal	Peace Sells... but Who's Buying?	Sep 16, 2008	No	None
"The Conjuring"	Megadeth	1986	Metal	Peace Sells... but Who's Buying?	Sep 16, 2008	No	None
"Devil's Island"	Megadeth	1986	Metal	Peace Sells... but Who's Buying?	Sep 16, 2008	No	None
"Good Mourning/Black Friday"	Megadeth	1986	Metal	Peace Sells... but Who's Buying?	Sep 16, 2008	No	None
"Bad Omen"	Megadeth	1986	Metal	Peace Sells... but Who's Buying?	Sep 16, 2008	No	None
"I Ain't Superstitious"	Megadeth	1986	Metal	Peace Sells... but Who's Buying?	Sep 16, 2008	No	None
"My Last Words"	Megadeth	1986	Metal	Peace Sells... but Who's Buying?	Sep 16, 2008	No	None
"Tom Sawyer" (Original Version)	Rush	1981	Prog	Moving Pictures	Sep 23, 2008	Yes	None
"Red Barchetta"	Rush	1981	Prog	Moving Pictures	Sep 23, 2008	Yes	None
"YYZ"	Rush	1981	Prog	Moving Pictures	Sep 23, 2008	Yes	None
"Limelight" (Original Version)	Rush	1981	Prog	Moving Pictures	Sep 23, 2008	Yes	None
"The Camera Eye"	Rush	1981	Prog	Moving Pictures	Sep 23, 2008	Yes	None
"Witch Hunt (Part III of Fear)"	Rush	1981	Prog	Moving Pictures	Sep 23, 2008	Yes	None
"Vital Signs"	Rush	1981	Prog	Moving Pictures	Sep 23, 2008	Yes	None
"Sorrow"	Bad Religion	2002	Punk	Single	Sep 23, 2008	No	None
"She Sells Sanctuary"	The Cult	1985	Rock	Single	Sep 23, 2008	Yes	None
"Bandages"	Hot Hot Heat	2002	Alternative	Single	Sep 23, 2008	No	None
"Shoot the Runner"	Kasabian	2006	Indie Rock	Single	Sep 23, 2008	No	None
"You're No Rock N Roll Fun"	Sleater-Kinney	2000	Indie Rock	Single	Sep 23, 2008	No	None
"Love Spreads"	The Stone Roses	1994	Alternative	Single	Sep 23, 2008	No	None
"The Power of Equality"	Red Hot Chili Peppers	1991	Alternative	Blood Sugar Sex Magik	Sep 30, 2008	No	None
"If You Have to Ask"	Red Hot Chili Peppers	1991	Alternative	Blood Sugar Sex Magik	Sep 30, 2008	No	None
"Breaking the Girl"	Red Hot Chili Peppers	1991	Alternative	Blood Sugar Sex Magik	Sep 30, 2008	No	None
"Funky Monks"	Red Hot Chili Peppers	1991	Alternative	Blood Sugar Sex Magik	Sep 30, 2008	No	None
"Suck My Kiss"	Red Hot Chili Peppers	1991	Alternative	Blood Sugar Sex Magik	Sep 30, 2008	No	None
"I Could Have Lied"	Red Hot Chili Peppers	1991	Alternative	Blood Sugar Sex Magik	Sep 30, 2008	No	None
"Mellowship Slinky in B Major"	Red Hot Chili Peppers	1991	Alternative	Blood Sugar Sex Magik	Sep 30, 2008	No	None
"The Righteous and the Wicked"	Red Hot Chili Peppers	1991	Alternative	Blood Sugar Sex Magik	Sep 30, 2008	No	None
"Blood Sugar Sex Magik"	Red Hot Chili Peppers	1991	Alternative	Blood Sugar Sex Magik	Sep 30, 2008	No	None
"Under the Bridge"	Red Hot Chili Peppers	1991	Alternative	Blood Sugar Sex Magik	Sep 30, 2008	No	Pro Guitar/Bass
"Naked in the Rain"	Red Hot Chili Peppers	1991	Alternative	Blood Sugar Sex Magik	Sep 30, 2008	No	None
"Apache Rose Peacock"	Red Hot Chili Peppers	1991	Alternative	Blood Sugar Sex Magik	Sep 30, 2008	No	None
"The Greeting Song"	Red Hot Chili Peppers	1991	Alternative	Blood Sugar Sex Magik	Sep 30, 2008	No	None
"My Lovely Man"	Red Hot Chili Peppers	1991	Alternative	Blood Sugar Sex Magik	Sep 30, 2008	No	None
"Sir Psycho Sexy"	Red Hot Chili Peppers	1991	Alternative	Blood Sugar Sex Magik	Sep 30, 2008	No	None
"They're Red Hot"	Red Hot Chili Peppers	1991	Alternative	Blood Sugar Sex Magik	Sep 30, 2008	No	None
"All Right Now"	Free	1970	Classic Rock	Single	Oct 7, 2008	No	None
"Stop!"	Against Me!	2007	Punk	Single	Oct 7, 2008	No	None
"Bad to the Bone"	George Thorogood & the Destroyers	1982	Rock	Single	Oct 7, 2008	Yes	None
"Cream and Bastards Rise"	Harvey Danger	2005	Alternative	Single	Oct 7, 2008	No	None
"Nearly Lost You"	Screaming Trees	1992	Grunge	Single	Oct 7, 2008	Yes	None
"Push It"	Static-X	1999	Nu-Metal	Single	Oct 7, 2008	No	None
"Gone Away"	The Offspring	1997	Punk	The Offspring 01	Oct 7, 2008	No	None
"Pretty Fly (For a White Guy)"	The Offspring	1998	Punk	The Offspring 01	Oct 7, 2008	No	None
"Self Esteem"	The Offspring	1994	Punk	The Offspring 01	Oct 7, 2008	No	Pro Guitar/Bass
"Dr. Feelgood"	Mötley Crüe	1989	Glam	Dr. Feelgood	Oct 14, 2008	No	None
"Slice of Your Pie"	Mötley Crüe	1989	Glam	Dr. Feelgood	Oct 14, 2008	No	None
"Rattlesnake Shake"	Mötley Crüe	1989	Glam	Dr. Feelgood	Oct 14, 2008	No	None
"Kickstart My Heart"	Mötley Crüe	1989	Glam	Dr. Feelgood	Oct 14, 2008	No	Pro Guitar/Bass
"Without You"	Mötley Crüe	1989	Glam	Dr. Feelgood	Oct 14, 2008	Yes	None
"Same Ol' Situation (S.O.S.)"	Mötley Crüe	1989	Glam	Dr. Feelgood	Oct 14, 2008	No	None
"Sticky Sweet"	Mötley Crüe	1989	Glam	Dr. Feelgood	Oct 14, 2008	No	None
"She Goes Down"	Mötley Crüe	1989	Glam	Dr. Feelgood	Oct 14, 2008	No	None
"Don't Go Away Mad (Just Go Away)"	Mötley Crüe	1989	Glam	Dr. Feelgood	Oct 14, 2008	Yes	None
"Time for Change"	Mötley Crüe	1989	Glam	Dr. Feelgood	Oct 14, 2008	Yes	None
"Breed"	Nirvana	1991	Grunge	Nirvana 01	Oct 21, 2008	No	Pro Guitar/Bass
"Lounge Act"	Nirvana	1991	Grunge	Nirvana 01	Oct 21, 2008	No	Pro Guitar/Bass
"On a Plain"	Nirvana	1991	Grunge	Nirvana 01	Oct 21, 2008	No	Pro Guitar/Bass
"Polly"	Nirvana	1991	Grunge	Nirvana 01	Oct 21, 2008	No	Pro Guitar/Bass
"Something in the Way"	Nirvana	1991	Grunge	Nirvana 01	Oct 21, 2008	Yes	Pro Guitar/Bass
"Stay Away"	Nirvana	1991	Grunge	Nirvana 01	Oct 21, 2008	No	Pro Guitar/Bass
"Territorial Pissings"	Nirvana	1991	Grunge	Nirvana 01	Oct 21, 2008	No	Pro Guitar/Bass
"Hong Kong Garden"	Siouxsie and The Banshees	1981	Pop-Rock	Siouxsie and the Banshees 01	Oct 28, 2008	Yes	None
"Kiss Them for Me"	Siouxsie and The Banshees	1991	Pop-Rock	Siouxsie and the Banshees 01	Oct 28, 2008	Yes	None
"The Killing Jar"	Siouxsie and The Banshees	1988	Pop-Rock	Siouxsie and the Banshees 01	Oct 28, 2008	Yes	None
"Dammit"	Blink-182	1997	Punk	Single	Oct 28, 2008	No	Pro Guitar/Bass
"Well Thought Out Twinkles"	Silversun Pickups	2006	Indie Rock	Single	Oct 28, 2008	Yes	None
"Melatonin"	Silversun Pickups	2006	Indie Rock	Single	Oct 28, 2008	Yes	None
"Pretty in Pink"	The Psychedelic Furs	1981	New Wave	Single	Oct 28, 2008	Yes	None
"Dune Buggy"	The Presidents of the United States of America	1995	Grunge	The Presidents of the United States of America 01	Nov 4, 2008	No	None
"Feather Pluck'n"	The Presidents of the United States of America	1995	Grunge	The Presidents of the United States of America 01	Nov 4, 2008	Yes	None
"Ladybug"	The Presidents of the United States of America	2008	Grunge	The Presidents of the United States of America 01	Nov 4, 2008	Yes	None
"Use Me"	Hinder	2008	Rock	Single	Nov 4, 2008	No	None
"I Don't Care"	Fall Out Boy	2008	Pop-Rock	Single	Nov 4, 2008	No	None
"Ashes to Fire" (Note: Song is also available through a special promotion.)	Ghost Hounds	2008	Rock	Rock Band 2 20-Pack	Nov 6, 2008	Yes	None
"Bounce"	The Cab	2008	Pop-Rock	Rock Band 2 20-Pack	Nov 6, 2008	No	None
"Burn You Down"	Opiate for the Masses	2008	Rock	Rock Band 2 20-Pack	Nov 6, 2008	No	None
"Crazy Tuesday"	Thenewno2	2008	Pop-Rock	Rock Band 2 20-Pack	Nov 6, 2008	Yes	None
"Database Corrupted"	Dealership	2004	Indie Rock	Rock Band 2 20-Pack	Nov 6, 2008	Yes	None
"Desperate Times, Desperate Measures"	Underoath	2008	Emo	Rock Band 2 20-Pack	Nov 6, 2008	No	None
"Get It On"	The Chevelles	2008	Rock	Rock Band 2 20-Pack	Nov 6, 2008	No	None
"Give It to Me"	Cocktail Slippers	2006	Indie Rock	Rock Band 2 20-Pack	Nov 6, 2008	No	None
"I Wanna Be Your Man"	Endeverafter	2007	Rock	Rock Band 2 20-Pack	Nov 6, 2008	No	None
"I'm Gone, I'm Going"	Lesley Roy	2008	Pop-Rock	Rock Band 2 20-Pack	Nov 6, 2008	Yes	None
"I.V."	X Japan	2008	Metal	Rock Band 2 20-Pack	Nov 6, 2008	No	None
"If I Ain't Got You"	The Len Price 3	2007	Rock	Rock Band 2 20-Pack	Nov 6, 2008	Yes	None
"Like a Fool"	Shaimus	2008	Indie Rock	Rock Band 2 20-Pack	Nov 6, 2008	Yes	None
"Magnetic Baby"	Semi Precious Weapons	2008	Glam	Rock Band 2 20-Pack	Nov 6, 2008	No	None
"No Regrets"	Authority Zero	2007	Punk	Rock Band 2 20-Pack	Nov 6, 2008	No	None
"Prequel to the Sequel"	Between the Buried and Me	2007	Prog	Rock Band 2 20-Pack	Nov 6, 2008	No	None
"Sons and Daughters"	The 88	2008	Pop-Rock	Rock Band 2 20-Pack	Nov 6, 2008	No	None
"The Feeling"	Kutless	2008	Rock	Rock Band 2 20-Pack	Nov 6, 2008	Yes	None
"The Time Is Wrong"	Tickle Me Pink	2008	Emo	Rock Band 2 20-Pack	Nov 6, 2008	Yes	None
"Young"	Hollywood Undead	2008	Nu-Metal	Rock Band 2 20-Pack	Nov 6, 2008	No	None
"Doll"	Foo Fighters	1997	Alternative	The Colour and the Shape	Nov 11, 2008	Yes	None
"Monkey Wrench"	Foo Fighters	1997	Alternative	The Colour and the Shape	Nov 11, 2008	No	Pro Guitar/Bass
"Hey, Johnny Park!"	Foo Fighters	1997	Alternative	The Colour and the Shape	Nov 11, 2008	Yes	None
"My Poor Brain"	Foo Fighters	1997	Alternative	The Colour and the Shape	Nov 11, 2008	No	None
"Wind Up"	Foo Fighters	1997	Alternative	The Colour and the Shape	Nov 11, 2008	Yes	None
"Up in Arms"	Foo Fighters	1997	Alternative	The Colour and the Shape	Nov 11, 2008	Yes	None
"My Hero"	Foo Fighters	1997	Alternative	The Colour and the Shape	Nov 11, 2008	Yes	None
"See You"	Foo Fighters	1997	Alternative	The Colour and the Shape	Nov 11, 2008	Yes	None
"Enough Space"	Foo Fighters	1997	Alternative	The Colour and the Shape	Nov 11, 2008	Yes	None
"February Stars"	Foo Fighters	1997	Alternative	The Colour and the Shape	Nov 11, 2008	Yes	None
"Walking After You"	Foo Fighters	1997	Alternative	The Colour and the Shape	Nov 11, 2008	Yes	None
"New Way Home"	Foo Fighters	1997	Alternative	The Colour and the Shape	Nov 11, 2008	Yes	None
"California über alles"	Dead Kennedys	1987	Punk	Dead Kennedys 01	Nov 18, 2008	No	None
"Holiday in Cambodia"	Dead Kennedys	1987	Punk	Dead Kennedys 01	Nov 18, 2008	No	None
"Police Truck"	Dead Kennedys	1987	Punk	Dead Kennedys 01	Nov 18, 2008	No	None
"Mica"	Mission of Burma	1982	Punk	Mission of Burma 01	Nov 18, 2008	Yes	None
"That's How I Escaped My Certain Fate"	Mission of Burma	1982	Punk	Mission of Burma 01	Nov 18, 2008	Yes	None
"That's When I Reach for My Revolver"	Mission of Burma	1981	Punk	Mission of Burma 01	Nov 18, 2008	No	None
"Forever"	In This Moment	2008	Metal	Century Media Girls of Metal 01	Nov 18, 2008	Yes	None
"Closer"	Lacuna Coil	2006	Metal	Century Media Girls of Metal 01	Nov 18, 2008	No	None
"Swamped"	Lacuna Coil	2002	Metal	Century Media Girls of Metal 01	Nov 18, 2008	Yes	None
"Gone"	Crooked X	2008	Metal	Single	Nov 18, 2008	Yes	None
"Mr. Brightside"	The Killers	2004	Alternative	The Killers 01	Nov 25, 2008	No	None
"Spaceman"	The Killers	2008	Alternative	The Killers 01	Nov 25, 2008	Yes	None
"Smile Like You Mean It"	The Killers	2004	Alternative	The Killers 01	Nov 25, 2008	Yes	None
"Caprici Di Diablo"	Yngwie Malmsteen's Rising Force	2008	Metal	Yngwie Malmsteen 01	Nov 25, 2008	No	None
"Damnation Game"	Yngwie Malmsteen's Rising Force	2008	Metal	Yngwie Malmsteen 01	Nov 25, 2008	No	None
"Red Devil"	Yngwie Malmsteen's Rising Force	2008	Metal	Yngwie Malmsteen 01	Nov 25, 2008	No	None
"Jesus Christ Pose"	Soundgarden	1991	Grunge	Single	Nov 25, 2008	No	None
"Pretty Noose"	Soundgarden	1996	Grunge	Single	Nov 25, 2008	No	Pro Guitar/Bass
"Laid to Rest"	Lamb of God	2004	Metal	Single	Nov 25, 2008	No	None
"Are You Dead Yet?"	Children of Bodom	2005	Metal	Single	Dec 2, 2008	No	None
"Tutto è possibile"	Finley	2006	Punk	Single	Dec 2, 2008	Yes	None
"Hay Poco Rock N Roll"	Platero y Tú	1994	Rock	Single	Dec 2, 2008	No	None
"Tempted"	Squeeze	1981	New Wave	Single	Dec 2, 2008	Yes	None
"Ready, Set, Go!"	Tokio Hotel	2007	Pop-Rock	Single	Dec 2, 2008	Yes	None
"Real World"	All-American Rejects	2008	Emo	Single	Dec 2, 2008	No	None
"Headphones On"	Miranda Cosgrove	2008	Pop-Rock	Single	Dec 2, 2008	Yes	None
"Body I Occupy"	The Naked Brothers Band	2008	Pop-Rock	Single	Dec 2, 2008	Yes	None
"I Don't Want to Go to School"	The Naked Brothers Band	2008	Pop-Rock	Single	Dec 2, 2008	Yes	None
"Just a Girl"	No Doubt	1995	Pop-Rock	The Singles 1992-2003 (Note: Song is also available as part of "No Doubt Tragic Kingdom: The Complete Album".)	Dec 9, 2008	Yes	None
"It's My Life"	No Doubt	2003	Pop-Rock	The Singles 1992-2003	Dec 9, 2008	Yes	None
"Hey Baby"	No Doubt	2003	Pop-Rock	The Singles 1992-2003	Dec 9, 2008	Yes	None
"Bathwater"	No Doubt	2003	Pop-Rock	The Singles 1992-2003	Dec 9, 2008	Yes	None
"Sunday Morning"	No Doubt	1995	Pop-Rock	The Singles 1992-2003	Dec 9, 2008	Yes	None
"Hella Good"	No Doubt	2003	Pop-Rock	The Singles 1992-2003	Dec 9, 2008	No	None
"Underneath It All"	No Doubt	2003	Pop-Rock	The Singles 1992-2003	Dec 9, 2008	Yes	None
"Excuse Me Mr."	No Doubt	1995	Pop-Rock	The Singles 1992-2003	Dec 9, 2008	Yes	None
"Running"	No Doubt	2003	Pop-Rock	The Singles 1992-2003	Dec 9, 2008	Yes	None
"Spiderwebs"	No Doubt	1995	Pop-Rock	The Singles 1992-2003	Dec 9, 2008	Yes	None
"Simple Kind of Life"	No Doubt	2003	Pop-Rock	The Singles 1992-2003	Dec 9, 2008	Yes	None
"Don't Speak"	No Doubt	1995	Pop-Rock	The Singles 1992-2003	Dec 9, 2008	Yes	None
"Ex-Girlfriend"	No Doubt	2003	Pop-Rock	The Singles 1992-2003	Dec 9, 2008	Yes	None
"Mud on the Tires"	Brad Paisley	2003	Country	Going Country 01	Dec 16, 2008	Yes	None
"Hillbilly Deluxe"	Brooks & Dunn	2005	Country	Going Country 01	Dec 16, 2008	No	None
"Free and Easy (Down the Road I Go)"	Dierks Bentley	2006	Country	Going Country 01	Dec 16, 2008	Yes	None
"Sin Wagon"	Dixie Chicks	1999	Country	Going Country 01	Dec 16, 2008	No	None
"Gunpowder & Lead"	Miranda Lambert	2007	Country	Going Country 01	Dec 16, 2008	No	None
"Hanukkah Blessings"	Barenaked Ladies	2004	Rock	Rockin' the Holidays 2008	Dec 23, 2008	Yes	None
"Christmas Is the Time to Say I Love You"	Billy Squier	1994	Classic Rock	Rockin' the Holidays 2008	Dec 23, 2008	Yes	None
"Blue Christmas"	The Pretenders	2008	New Wave	Rockin' the Holidays 2008	Dec 23, 2008	Yes	None
"This Is a Call"	Foo Fighters	1995	Alternative	Foo Fighters 01	Dec 23, 2008	Yes	None
"Times Like These"	Foo Fighters	2002	Alternative	Foo Fighters 01	Dec 23, 2008	Yes	None
"DOA"	Foo Fighters	2005	Alternative	Foo Fighters 01	Dec 23, 2008	Yes	None
"Space Truckin'"	Deep Purple	1972	Prog	Single	Dec 30, 2008	Yes	None
"Funk #49"	James Gang	1970	Classic Rock	Single	Dec 30, 2008	Yes	Pro Guitar/Bass
"Hymn 43"	Jethro Tull	1971	Prog	Single	Dec 30, 2008	No	None
"Take Back the City"	Snow Patrol	2008	Alternative	Single	Dec 30, 2008	Yes	None

== Promotions ==
Following the release of Rock Band, Harmonix and EA began to form partnerships with different companies and bands to provide promotional content.

- Harmonix Pack 01 was first released as part of a bonus disc included with the February 2008 issue of Official Xbox Magazine.
- "Inside the Fire" and "Indestructible" (from Disturbed Pack 01) were offered at no cost in June 2008 to customers who preordered the band's album Indestructible through Best Buy's online store.
- Crüe Fest Pack 01 was handed out as a prize in Stride's Rock Band Off, held in June 2008.
- On November 6, 2008 Harmonix began distributing 20 free downloadable songs to owners of Rock Band 2 for the Xbox 360 and PlayStation 3. The song pack could only be downloaded after redeeming a code printed inside the game's manual. These songs were released to the Wii as free downloads on January 13, 2009, and could be found in the Rock Band Music Store. Harmonix has made no announcement regarding plans to release these songs through the Music Store for the 360 or PS3. This content is playable in both Rock Band and Rock Band 2 for the 360 and PS3. Wii owners can only use this content in Rock Band 2.
