= It's Alive! (The New Cars album) =

Live album by The New Cars
- Released: June 6, 2006
- Venue: Center Staging Studios (Burbank)
- Studio: Big Brother Studios (Los Angeles)
- Genres: New wave; pop rock
- Length: 71:49
- Label: Eleven Seven
- Producer: The New Cars

Professional ratings
Aggregate scores
Source	Rating
Metacritic	54/100
Review scores
Source	Rating
AllMusic	3.5/5 stars
Entertainment Weekly	C−
Pitchfork	2.8/10

It's Alive! is the only album released by The New Cars. The album features 15 live tracks, 12 of which are songs known as being performed by the original Cars. The remaining two, "I Saw the Light" and "Open My Eyes", were popularized by New Cars member Todd Rundgren ("Open My Eyes" was originally performed by Rundgren's earlier garage rock group, Nazz). The album ends with three new studio tracks, recorded specifically for this release.

== Critical reception ==
It's Alive! was met with "mixed or average" reviews from critics. At Metacritic, which assigns a weighted average rating out of 100 to reviews from mainstream publications, this release received an average score of 54 based on 8 reviews.

In a review for AllMusic, critic reviewer Stephen Thomas Erlewine wrote: "It's Alive functions as a good appetizer for the tour: it's not earth-shaking, but it's far better than nearly any other reunion of this kind." At Pitchfork, Mark Hogan explained: "The first hour or so of It's Alive is perfect for Cars fans so diehard they'd not only pay for a live album of songs they mostly already own, but a live album 20 years after the fact with only two original members and a different lead singer."

== Track listing ==
It's Alive! track listing
No.	Title	Writer(s)	Length
1.	"Just What I Needed"	Ric Ocasek	4:11
2.	"Let's Go"	Ocasek	3:49
3.	"Candy-O"	Ocasek	2:49
4.	"You Might Think"	Ocasek	3:12
5.	"My Best Friend's Girl"	Ocasek	4:12
6.	"I Saw the Light"	Todd Rundgren	3:02
7.	"You're All I've Got Tonight"	Ocasek	5:23
8.	"Not Tonight"	Rundgren; Greg Hawkes; Elliot Easton	3:33
9.	"Drive"	Ocasek	4:04
10.	"Moving in Stereo"	Ocasek; Hawkes	5:14
11.	"Shake It Up"	Ocasek	3:45
12.	"Dangerous Type"	Ocasek	4:24
13.	"Bye Bye Love"	Ocasek	5:01
14.	"Open My Eyes"	Rundgren	3:01
15.	"Good Times Roll"	Ocasek	4:55
16.	"Not Tonight" (Studio track)	Rundgren; Hawkes; Easton	3:25
17.	"Warm" (Studio track)	Rundgren; Hawkes; Easton	4:03
18.	"More" (Studio track)	Rundgren; Hawkes; Easton	3:46

== Personnel ==
- Todd Rundgren – lead vocals, rhythm guitar
- Elliot Easton – lead guitar, background vocals
- Greg Hawkes – keyboards, background vocals
- Kasim Sulton – bass guitar, background vocals, lead vocals on "Drive"
- Prairie Prince – drums, percussion (tracks 1–15 and 17)
- Kenny Aronoff – drums (tracks 16 and 18)
