= Road Rage Tour =

2006 concert tour by the New Cars and Blondie

- Tour by The New Cars and Blondie
- Location: North America
- Associated album: It's Alive! (The New Cars); Greatest Hits: Sound & Vision (Blondie)
- Start date: May 12, 2006
- End date: July 1, 2006
- Legs: 1
- No. of shows: 18

Blondie tour chronology
- UK Tour (2005); Road Rage Tour (2006); Asia Tour (2006)

The Road Rage Tour was a concert tour co-headlined by The New Cars and Blondie in the North America in 2006.

== Background ==
The Road Rage Tour was The New Cars' first tour, the first time an incarnation of The Cars has toured in seventeen years. VH-1 Classic sponsored the tour, and commercials were aired frequently on VH-1 and its sister channels to draw attention to the tour.

The tour featured a unique internet promotion. With each online ticket purchase through VH1classic.com or Ticketmaster.com a full album The New Cars and Blondie: Road Rage was offered to free download from eMusic.com. The album included five songs performed by The New Cars (four classic songs of The Cars, recorded live and the newly penned studio track "Not Tonight") and five songs performed by Blondie (four previously unreleased live tracks and one new studio cover of Roxy Music hit "More than This"). Currently eMusic offers a shortened version of the album in a form of 4 track EP.

== Set ==
The New Cars set was reportedly designed by drummer Prairie Prince. It featured large, circular, metallic rings with screens in them suspended above the stage. The rings were meant to resemble a stop light. The drummer sat in a large glowing ring, and the keyboards were elevated behind the center of the stage. The set was concealed when Blondie performed by a large black tarp, meant to resemble the New York City skyline.

== Tour cancellation ==
On June 5, 2006, the driver of The New Cars' tour bus swerved to avoid a collision with a vehicle, resulting in the New Cars' guitarist Elliot Easton suffering a broken left clavicle. Easton played four more shows despite the injury, but when it became apparent that he needed surgery, the rest of the tour was cancelled. Easton had surgery in New York on June 12.

== Tour dates ==
List of 2006 concerts
Date	City	Country	Venue
May 12, 2006	Robinsonville	United States	Grand Casino Tunica Event Center
May 13, 2006	Grand Prairie	United States	Nokia Theatre
May 17, 2006	Phoenix	United States	Dodge Theatre
May 19, 2006	Las Vegas	United States	Aladdin Theatre for the Performing Arts
May 20, 2006	Los Angeles	United States	Gibson Amphitheatre
May 23, 2006	Alpine	United States	Viejas Casino
May 25, 2006	Saratoga	United States	Mountain Winery
May 26, 2006	Reno	United States	Reno Events Center
May 27, 2006	Kelseyville	United States	Konocti Field Amphitheater
May 30, 2006	Greenwood Village	United States	Coors Amphitheatre
June 1, 2006	Hinckley	United States	Grand Casino Amphitheatre
June 3, 2006	Highland Park	United States	Ravinia Pavilion
June 4, 2006	Cuyahoga Falls	United States	Blossom Music Center
June 6, 2006	Vienna	United States	Filene Center
June 7, 2006	Boston	United States	Bank of America Pavilion
June 9, 2006	Wantagh	United States	Jones Beach Music Theater
June 10, 2006	Holmdel	United States	PNC Bank Arts Center
June 20, 2006	Buffalo	United States	Rockin' at the Knox^{[A]}

Notes

- A This show was Blondie only without The New Cars

=== Cancelled dates ===
Date	City	Country	Venue
June 13, 2006	Orlando	United States	Hard Rock Live
June 14, 2006	Clearwater	United States	Ruth Eckerd Hall
June 15, 2006	Hollywood	United States	Seminole Hard Rock Hotel and Casino Hollywood
June 17, 2006	Atlanta	United States	Chastain Park Amphitheater
June 18, 2006	North Charleston	United States	Oyster Shell & North Charleston Coliseum
June 21, 2006	Toronto	Canada	Molson Amphitheatre
June 23, 2006	Montreal	Canada	Bell Centre
June 24, 2006	Atlantic City	United States	Borgata Event Center
June 25, 2006	Uncasville	United States	Mohegan Sun
June 30, 2006	Clarkston	United States	DTE Energy Music Theatre
July 1, 2006	Saratoga Springs	United States	Saratoga Performing Arts Center

== Road Rage Winter Tour ==
After the original tour cancellation The New Cars and Blondie went separate ways. Blondie went on short tour to Asia in September with single stops in USA before and after, while The New Cars continued the Road Rage tour in winter without Blondie with Persephone's Bees as a supporting act. The winter dates were scheduled to be of much smaller, theatre, venues, than large-scale arenas of the summer leg. Kasim Sulton was not featured on several shows due to his touring with Meat Loaf in support of Bat Out of Hell III: The Monster Is Loose album with Atom Ellis filling for him.

=== Promotion ===
VIP Tickets, a popular feature during the summer tour, was available for most venues of the winter leg, with the exclusion of the Count Basie Theatre in Red Bank. Reserved fan-club seating was also available at most venues, except the Count Basie. A ticket pre-sale began on September 18, 2006. Ticketmaster supplied the tickets for most of the venues, although Seatadvisor and various box offices did carry tickets for others.

== Personnel ==
Blondie

- Debbie Harry – vocals
- Chris Stein – guitars
- Clem Burke – drums
- Kevin Patrick – keyboards
- Leigh Foxx – bass
- Paul Carbonara – guitars

The New Cars

- Todd Rundgren – lead vocals, rhythm guitar
- Elliot Easton – lead guitar, backing vocals
- Greg Hawkes – keyboards, backing vocals
- Kasim Sulton – bass guitar, lead and backing vocals
- Prairie Prince – drums, percussion
