= All Mixed Up (The Cars song) =

- The single release of the song in the Netherlands

Single by the Cars

from the album The Cars
- B-side: "You're All I've Got Tonight"
- Released: 1979
- Genre: Rock; new wave
- Length: 4:14
- Label: Elektra 46014
- Songwriter: Ric Ocasek
- Producer: Roy Thomas Baker

The Cars Netherlands singles chronology
"Just What I Needed" (1978)	"All Mixed Up" (1979)	"Let's Go" (1979)

The Cars track listing
- 9 tracks Side one: 1. "Good Times Roll"; 2. "My Best Friend's Girl"; 3. "Just What I Needed"; 4. "I'm in Touch with Your World"; 5. "Don't Cha Stop"; Side two: 6. "You're All I've Got Tonight"; 7. "Bye Bye Love"; 8. "Moving in Stereo"; 9. "All Mixed Up"

Audio
- "All Mixed Up" on YouTube

"All Mixed Up" is a song by the Cars and the final track on their 1978 eponymous debut studio album. It was written by bandleader Ric Ocasek.

== Background ==
On the album, "All Mixed Up" is bridged together with "Moving in Stereo". Released as the B-side to the single "Good Times Roll", the song has received widespread airplay on American FM rock radio stations, and is generally played together with "Moving in Stereo" on AOR and classic rock radio stations. The song also saw single release in the Netherlands, backed with "You're All I've Got Tonight" (also from The Cars.)

"All Mixed Up" features bassist Benjamin Orr on lead vocals in the studio version, though Ocasek sang lead vocals on the demo version. The song afforded Greg Hawkes a chance to step away from his many synthesizers and play the closing saxophone solo, the only one in the Cars' discography. "All Mixed Up" also featured the Mu-Tron Octavider pedal, which Benjamin Orr recalled he "had to have".

Classic Rock History critic Brian Kachejian rated "Moving in Stereo" combined with "All Mixed Up" as the Cars' all-time greatest song. Classic Rock History critic Emily Fagan rated it as the Cars 4th best song sung by Orr, saying that it "exemplifies the band's ability to blend catchy pop melodies with deeper, more introspective themes." Ultimate Classic Rock critic Dave Swanson rated it as the 2nd best Benjamin Orr Cars song, saying that "The haunting mood created on this track has no equal in the band's catalog" and that "Orr's vocal is full of yearning, confusion and drama."

== Other versions ==
- When Cars guitarist Elliot Easton and keyboardist Greg Hawkes recruited new musicians to replace Ocasek, the deceased Orr, and drummer David Robinson, they chose Todd Rundgren as primary singer, but "All Mixed Up" and the hit ballad "Drive" were sung by bassist/vocalist Kasim Sulton.
- This song was later covered by the Red House Painters on their 1996 album, Songs for a Blue Guitar.
