= I'm in Touch with Your World =

Song by the Cars

from the album The Cars
- Released: May 29, 1978
- Genre: New wave
- Length: 3:31
- Label: Elektra
- Songwriter: Ric Ocasek
- Producer: Roy Thomas Baker

The Cars track listing
- 9 tracks Side one: 1. "Good Times Roll"; 2. "My Best Friend's Girl"; 3. "Just What I Needed"; 4. "I'm in Touch with Your World"; 5. "Don't Cha Stop"; Side two: 6. "You're All I've Got Tonight"; 7. "Bye Bye Love"; 8. "Moving in Stereo"; 9. "All Mixed Up"

Audio
- "I'm in Touch with Your World" on YouTube

"I'm in Touch with Your World" is a song written by Ric Ocasek and recorded by the American rock band the Cars, from their debut studio album, The Cars (1978).

== Background ==
"I'm in Touch with Your World" features many bizarre sound effects played by Greg Hawkes. Hawkes said, "That was always one of my favorite ones to play live." He continued, "Plus, I figured it'd be fun for people to watch visually." The line "everything is science fiction" was the result of Hawkes mishearing Ocasek's original lyric, "everything you say is fiction"; hence the spacey sound effect after the line. Ocasek changed it to accommodate this. (Liner notes for The Cars Deluxe Edition, Rhino, 1999)

Aside from being released on The Cars, the song appeared as the B-side to the band's debut single, "Just What I Needed".

== Reception ==
"I'm in Touch with Your World" has received mixed reviews from critics. Rolling Stone critic Kit Rachlis said "'I'm in Touch with Your World' and 'Moving in Stereo' are the kind of songs that certify psychedelia's bad name." On Billboard's 1978 review of The Cars, they noted "I'm in Touch with Your World" as one of the "[b]est cuts" on the album, while Jaime Welton, author of 1001 Albums You Must Hear Before You Die, said that the song "employs a variety of sound effects that would be at home in a Looney Tunes cartoon[.]" Pitchfork Media writer Ryan Schreiber said, "Songs like 'I'm in Touch with Your World' and 'Don't Cha Stop' are, to say the least, not some of the best songs rock music has produced."

== Personnel ==
- Ric Ocasek – lead vocals, rhythm guitar
- Elliot Easton – lead guitar, backing vocals
- Benjamin Orr – backing vocals, bass guitar
- David Robinson – drums, percussion, backing vocals
- Greg Hawkes – keyboards, percussion, backing vocals
