= You're All I've Got Tonight =

1978 song by The Cars

- B-side to "All Mixed Up" in NL

Song by the Cars

from the album The Cars
- Released: June 6, 1978
- Genre: Hard rock; new wave
- Length: 4:13
- Label: Elektra
- Songwriter: Ric Ocasek
- Producer: Roy Thomas Baker

The Cars track listing
- 9 tracks Side one: 1. "Good Times Roll"; 2. "My Best Friend's Girl"; 3. "Just What I Needed"; 4. "I'm in Touch with Your World"; 5. "Don't Cha Stop"; Side two: 6. "You're All I've Got Tonight"; 7. "Bye Bye Love"; 8. "Moving in Stereo"; 9. "All Mixed Up"

Audio
- "You're All I've Got Tonight" on YouTube

"You're All I've Got Tonight" is a song by the American rock band the Cars, from their debut studio album, The Cars (1978). Like "Bye Bye Love" and "Moving in Stereo", two other songs from the album, it continues to receive airplay on classic rock stations today despite never having been released as a single (although it did see release as the B-side to "All Mixed Up" in the Netherlands).

== Background ==
"You're All I've Got Tonight" was written and sung by the band's frontman, Ric Ocasek. Keyboardist Greg Hawkes said of the song, "Ric's got a knack for taking a common phrase like 'You're All I've Got Tonight' and making a great song out of it."

== Composition ==
The song opens with a tom-tom drum beat processed with a distinctive flanging effect, leading to a power chord riff played on distorted guitars that also have a distinctive flanging effect. Initially, the rhythm guitar plays a chromatic riff of power chords ascending from A, to A♯, to B, then E to B, and repeating. The riff gives way to an extended vamp on B major. To conclude the verses and introduce the chorus, the band sings "ah" in triads, descending in half notes, from B major to A major, while the music strictly maintains a B power chord. At this point, the song could have gone to an E major chord, which would complete a plagal cadence, or a V-IV-I turnaround. Instead, the chorus alternates between G and A major chords, with the vocal harmonies on the G featuring the major seventh, F♯.

The G to A progression leads back to the A–A♯–B riff of the next verse. Over the B power chord, lead guitarist Elliot Easton plays a trill between the notes D and D♯, respectively the minor and major thirds of the B chord, which reinforces the ambivalence of the song's key. During the second and third verses, a call and response effect is created between Ric Ocasek's vocals and Easton's lead guitar fills. Both of which are, increasingly, derived from the B blues scale.

After the second chorus, there is a brief, melodic guitar solo over the chorus music. After the third chorus, the band vamps over a B power chord, creating a feeling similar to the verses, as a new solo gradually emerges. During this solo, keyboardist Greg Hawkes alternates between high-pitched triads of A major and B major, while the rhythm guitars and bass remain on B. Ocasek's rhythm guitar part is strummed with the accents primarily on the off-beat eighth notes, a technique heard earlier on the album, in "Good Times Roll", another song centering on the chords B, A, and G.

After the second solo, there is one last iteration of the chorus, and the song ends abruptly, segueing into "Bye Bye Love". Because there is little to no pause between tracks, both songs are often played in succession by several radio stations as a two-fer.

== Reception ==
AllMusic reviewer Donald A. Guarisco said, "What might seem like a tongue-in-cheek pop tune (on paper) becomes a thumping fusion of new wave and hard rock in the studio to the one-two punch of a clever arrangement and a slick production job by Roy Thomas Baker. . . . [It] starts with a throbbing drumbeat and fuzzed-out guitar riffs that give it a hard rock punch but quickly adds waves of ethereal synthesizer and an arch vocal from Ric Ocasek that lend it a new wave edginess." The song was called a "wonderful pop song" by Kit Rachlis of Rolling Stone. Classic Rock History critic Brian Kachejian rated it as the Cars' 5th greatest song, particularly praising its harmonies, its chorus and Elliot Easton's guitar riffs.
