= Bye Bye Love =

Bye Bye Love may refer to:

- Bye Bye Love (film), a 1995 American comedy-drama
- "Bye Bye Love" (The Everly Brothers song), 1957
- "Bye Bye Love" (Cars song), 1978
- "Bye Bye Love", a song by the Backstreet Boys on their album This Is Us, 2009
