= Niagara Falls (Greg Hawkes album) =

Studio album by Greg Hawkes
- Released: May 1983
- Studio: Syncro Sound, Boston
- Label: Passport
- Producer: Greg Hawkes, Walter Turbitt

Greg Hawkes chronology
Niagara Falls (1983)	The Beatles Uke (2005)

Professional ratings
Review scores
Source	Rating
Allmusic	3/5 stars

Niagara Falls is the first solo album released by Greg Hawkes, best known as an original member of the Cars. It was released in 1983 by Passport Records. Hawkes plays all instruments (with one exception—see below), with programmed drums and multiple layers of keyboard parts, as well as rhythm guitar. It was recorded at Syncro Sound, a Boston recording studio owned by the Cars. Tuneful and not overly experimental, it sounds (despite the instrumental nature of the material) very much like the Shake It Up era of the Cars.

"Jet Lag" and "Voyage Into Space" are the only tunes to feature lyrics: "Jet lag / It's a real drag" and "Voyage into space / Check out some other place"—sometimes processed through a vocoder. "Voyage Into Space" also features the artist's wife, Elaine Hawkes, on flute.

Hawkes would not release another solo album for 25 years. His second solo album, though also instrumental, was very different in sound than this, his first: The Beatles Uke (2005) featured Hawkes playing instrumental versions of Beatles songs on the ukulele.

As of 2025, Niagara Falls is only available via the original LP and Cassette pressings, having never been officially reissued on streaming or CD.

== Track listing ==
1. "Niagara Falls" (3:42)
2. "Twenty-Seven Shirts" (3:55)
3. "Ants in Your Pants" (3:12)
4. "Llamas" (1:55)
5. "The Missing Link" (1:50)
6. "Block Party" (3:53)
7. "Jet Lag" (3:00)
8. "Beep Beep" (1:41)
9. "Bee System" (4:31)
10. "Voyage into Space" (3:34)
11. "Let There Be Lights" (3:54)

== Personnel ==
- Greg Hawkes – keyboards, drum machine, guitar, occasional vocals, noises, design
- Elaine Hawkes – additional flute (10)
- David Heglmeier, Roger Merritt – assistant engineers
- Walter Turbitt – recording and mixing engineer
- Thom Moore – recording engineer
- Elliot Roberts, Steve Berkowitz – management
- Greg Calbi – mastering
