= Don't Cha Stop =

Song by the Cars

from the album The Cars
- Released: June 6, 1978
- Genre: New wave
- Length: 3:01
- Label: Elektra
- Songwriter: Ric Ocasek
- Producer: Roy Thomas Baker

The Cars track listing
- 9 tracks Side one: 1. "Good Times Roll"; 2. "My Best Friend's Girl"; 3. "Just What I Needed"; 4. "I'm in Touch with Your World"; 5. "Don't Cha Stop"; Side two: 6. "You're All I've Got Tonight"; 7. "Bye Bye Love"; 8. "Moving in Stereo"; 9. "All Mixed Up"

Audio
- "Don't Cha Stop" on YouTube

"Don't Cha Stop" is a song by the American rock band the Cars. The song appears on their debut studio album The Cars (1978). The song is sung by bandleader Ric Ocasek.

== Reception ==
Rolling Stone critic Kit Rachlis said in his review of The Cars that "the songs bristle and -- in their harsher, more angular moments ('Bye Bye Love,' 'Don't Cha Stop') -- bray." On the Billboard review of The Cars, "Don't Cha Stop" was named one of the albums "[b]est cuts[.]"

== Other appearances ==
After being released on the 1978 album The Cars, "Don't Cha Stop" saw release as the B-side to "My Best Friend's Girl" in the U.S. and Japan. That single hit #35 in America. However, in Europe, the song "Moving in Stereo" was used as the B-side instead.

"Don't Cha Stop" later appeared on the compilation album Just What I Needed: The Cars Anthology, as one of the six songs from The Cars to appear.
