= New Collisions =

New wave pop band from the USA

- New Collisions at SXSW 2010

Background information
- Origin: Cambridge, MA, USA
- Genres: New wave, indie pop
- Label: Only Young Records
- Members: Sarah Guild; Scott Guild; Alex Stern; Zak Kahn; Casey Gruttadauria; Kevin Verni
- Website: Official website

New Collisions (also known as The New Collisions) is a new wave pop band from Cambridge, Massachusetts, USA.

== History ==
After gaining popularity in the Boston/Cambridge club scene, New Collisions was discovered in 2009 by Greg Hawkes of The Cars, who had become a fan of the band's live performances. Hawkes collaborated with the group on their debut EP, Invisible Embraces, produced by Anthony Resta (Duran Duran, Blondie, Collective Soul), and joined New Collisions onstage at several early shows.

The following year New Collisions released their first LP, The Optimist, produced by Sean Slade and Paul Kolderie (Radiohead, The Pixies, Hole). Matt James of PopMatters praised the lead single, "Dying Alone," calling it "spunky, spiky, new wave with smart cookie lyrics and a melody big enough to earn its own zip code." iTunes gave the album a positive review, writing, "With a sense of style and a minimum of irony, the New Collisions pull off the difficult feat of reworking familiar sounds into something fresh and vital."

Between 2009 and 2010, New Collisions went on seven national tours, one of which was as the opening act for The B-52s. They also provided tour support for Blondie, Missing Persons, Owl City, The Constellations, You Say Party, The Morning Benders, and performed at CMJ 2009 and 2010 and at SXSW 2010.

During this time, New Collisions was featured in New York Magazine, BlackBook Magazine, AOL/Spinner, PopMatters, Magnet, The Big Takeover, The Boston Globe, The Boston Phoenix, and many national blogs. In 2009, New Collisions was nominated for two Boston Music Awards: Best New Act and Best Pop Act. In 2010, The Improper Bostonian named New Collisions Boston's Best Local Band. "Afterglow," from Invisible Embraces, was licensed for the commercials of a 2010 Charlotte Russe national ad campaign. New Collisions is currently on break while members develop other projects.

== Discography ==
- Invisible Embraces (EP) (2009)
- The Optimist (LP) (2010)
- Fire in the Neighborhood (7") (2011)
