= The Cars (album) =

1978 studio album by the Cars

Studio album by the Cars
- Released: June 6, 1978
- Recorded: February 1978
- Studios: AIR (London, England)
- Genres: New wave; power pop; electronic rock
- Length: 35:20
- Label: Elektra
- Producer: Roy Thomas Baker

The Cars chronology
The Cars (1978)	Candy-O (1979)

Singles from The Cars
- 1. "Just What I Needed" Released: May 29, 1978; 2. "My Best Friend's Girl" Released: October 10, 1978; 3. "Good Times Roll" Released: February 20, 1979

The Cars is the debut studio album by American rock band the Cars, released on June 6, 1978, by Elektra Records. The album was produced by longtime collaborator Roy Thomas Baker, and spawned several hit singles, including "Just What I Needed", "My Best Friend's Girl", and "Good Times Roll", as well as other radio and film hits such as "Bye Bye Love" and "Moving in Stereo". The Cars peaked at number 18 on the U.S. Billboard 200 chart, and has been certified 6× Platinum by the Recording Industry Association of America (RIAA).

== Background ==
Formed in Boston, Massachusetts in 1976, the Cars consisted of Ric Ocasek, Benjamin Orr, Elliot Easton, David Robinson, and Greg Hawkes, all of whom had been in and out of multiple bands throughout the 1970s. After becoming a club staple, the band recorded a number of demos in early 1977. Some of these songs later appeared in completed form on The Cars, such as "Just What I Needed" and "My Best Friend's Girl", while others were saved for a later release, such as "Leave or Stay" and "Ta Ta Wayo Wayo" (both of which later saw release on their 1987 album Door to Door). The demos for "Just What I Needed" and "My Best Friend's Girl" were often played on Boston radio by disc jockey (DJ) Maxanne Sartori, giving the band frequent airplay.

Both Arista and Elektra Records attempted to sign the band, but in the end, Elektra was chosen, due to its lack of new wave acts, allowing the band to stand out more than they would have had they signed with the new wave-heavy Arista. Robinson said of the choice, "Here they had the Eagles and Jackson Browne, and along comes this crazy Boston band who wanted a black-and-white photo collage on their cover."

== Music and lyrics ==
Musically, The Cars has been described as new wave, power pop, and electronic rock. It featured a large amount of contemporary technology on many of its tracks, due to the band's appreciation for new equipment. Robinson said, "We'd always get the latest stuff from music stores even if it would be obsolete in two months. It reached the point where I'd have 10 or 12 foot switches to hit during a short set." The album's lyrics are notable for frontman Ocasek's use of irony and sarcasm. Keyboardist Hawkes said, "There was definitely a little self-conscious irony in there. We started out wanting to be electric and straight-ahead rock, and it kind of turned into an artier kind of thing."

== Artwork ==
The model featured on the album's front cover was Nataliya Medvedeva, a Russian poet, writer and singer.

Unlike many of the Cars' album covers, the cover for The Cars was designed by the record company, rather than drummer Robinson. Robinson said in an interview that he "had designed a very different album cover [for The Cars] that cost $80.00 to design." He continued, "I remember the price exactly. It was completely finished and everything, but it was a little more bizarre than the cover that they had in mind, so they changed some of it because of copyright problems and put it in as the inner sleeve. But I think that was way more how we envisioned who we were then." The cover was not well liked by the members of the band, however. Robinson said, "I thought that when the Elektra came out it was way too slick. The pictures of us I didn't like." Guitarist Elliot Easton expressed dislike for "that big grinning face", saying, "Man, I got tired of that cover."

== Release ==
The Cars peaked at No. 18 on the U.S. Billboard 200 in March 1979, spending 139 weeks on the chart. The record was also ranked No. 4 on the Billboard 200 year-chart for 1979.

Three singles were released from the album: "Just What I Needed" (No. 27 in the US, No. 17 in the UK), "My Best Friend's Girl" (No. 35 in the US, No. 3 in the UK), and "Good Times Roll" (No. 41 in the U.S.), all of which enjoyed heavy airplay on AOR radio stations. Aside from the singles, album tracks "You're All I've Got Tonight", "Bye Bye Love", and "Moving in Stereo" all became radio favorites.

== Critical reception and legacy ==
Professional ratings
Review scores
Source	Rating
AllMusic	5/5 stars
The Encyclopedia of Popular Music	4/5 stars
Q	4/5 stars
Record Mirror	4/5 stars
Rolling Stone	4/5 stars
The Rolling Stone Album Guide	4.5/5 stars
Spin Alternative Record Guide	8/10
The Village Voice	B+

The Cars was well received by music critics. "The pop songs are wonderful", Rolling Stone critic Kit Rachlis stated in his 1978 review, adding: "Easy and eccentric at the same time, all are potential hits." He found that "the album comes apart only when it becomes arty and falls prey to producer Roy Thomas Baker's lacquered sound and the group's own penchant for electronic effects."

Robert Christgau of The Village Voice wrote, "Ric Ocasek writes catchy, hardheaded-to-coldhearted songs eased by wryly rhapsodic touches, the playing is tight and tough, and it all sounds wonderful on the radio. But though on a cut-by-cut basis Roy Thomas Baker's production adds as much as it distracts, here's hoping the records get rawer."

In a retrospective review, AllMusic's Greg Prato praised The Cars as "a genuine rock masterpiece" and stated that "all nine tracks are new wave/rock classics", concluding: "With flawless performances, songwriting, and production, the Cars' debut remains one of rock's all-time classics."

Elliot Easton said of the album, "We used to joke that the first album should be called The Cars' Greatest Hits. We knew that a lot of great bands fall through the cracks. But we were getting enough feedback from people we respected to know that we were on the right track."

=== Retrospective rankings ===
In 2000, it was voted number 384 in Colin Larkin's All Time Top 1000 Albums. Rolling Stone ranked The Cars at number 282 on its 2003 list of "The 500 Greatest Albums of All Time", with the ranking slipping to number 284 in the 2012 update of the list, and to number 353 in the 2020 update.

=== Accolades ===
It was inducted into the National Recording Registry on April 16, 2024, for being "culturally, historically or aesthetically significant".

== Track listing ==
All tracks are written by Ric Ocasek; "Moving in Stereo" co-written with Greg Hawkes.

Side one
No.	Title	Lead vocals	Length
1.	"Good Times Roll"	Ocasek	3:44
2.	"My Best Friend's Girl"	Ocasek	3:43
3.	"Just What I Needed"	Benjamin Orr	3:44
4.	"I'm in Touch with Your World"	Ocasek	3:31
5.	"Don't Cha Stop"	Ocasek	3:01

Side two
No.	Title	Lead vocals	Length
6.	"You're All I've Got Tonight"	Ocasek	4:13
7.	"Bye Bye Love"	Orr	4:14
8.	"Moving in Stereo"	Orr	4:46
9.	"All Mixed Up"	Orr	4:14
Total length:			35:11

1999 remastered reissue bonus disc
No.	Title	Lead Vocals	Length
1.	"Good Times Roll" (live at the Paradise Theater, Boston, November 13, 1978)	Ocasek	3:39
2.	"My Best Friend's Girl" (demo)	Ocasek	3:52
3.	"Just What I Needed" (demo)	Orr	3:27
4.	"I'm in Touch with Your World" (demo)	Ocasek; Orr	3:28
5.	"Don't Cha Stop" (demo)	Ocasek	3:19
6.	"You're All I've Got Tonight" (demo)	Ocasek	4:05
7.	"Bye Bye Love" (demo)	Orr	4:07
8.	"Moving in Stereo" (demo)	Ocasek	5:02
9.	"All Mixed Up" (demo)	Ocasek	4:50
10.	"They Won't See You" (demo, previously unreleased)	Ocasek	3:56
11.	"Take What You Want" (demo, previously unreleased)	Ocasek	6:04
12.	"Wake Me Up" (demo, previously unreleased)	Orr	3:52
13.	"You Just Can't Push Me" (demo, previously unreleased)	Orr	3:27
14.	"Hotel Queenie" (demo, previously unreleased)	Ocasek	3:08
Total length:			56:16

== Personnel ==
Credits adapted from the liner notes of The Cars.

=== The Cars ===
- Ric Ocasek – vocals, rhythm guitar
- Benjamin Orr – vocals, bass
- Elliot Easton – lead guitar, backing vocals
- Greg Hawkes – keyboards, percussion, saxophone, backing vocals
- David Robinson – drums, percussion, Syndrums, backing vocals

=== Technical ===
- Roy Thomas Baker – production
- Geoff Workman – engineering
- Nigel Walker – second engineer
- George Marino – mastering at Sterling Sound (New York City)

=== Artwork ===
- Ron Coro – art direction
- Johnny Lee – design
- Elliot Gilbert – photography

== Charts ==
=== Weekly charts ===
Weekly chart performance for The Cars
Chart (1978–1979)	Peak position
Australian Albums (Kent Music Report)	35
Canada Top Albums/CDs (RPM)	50
New Zealand Albums (RMNZ)	5
UK Albums (Official Charts)	29
US Billboard 200	18

=== Year-end charts ===
1979 year-end chart performance for The Cars
Chart (1979)	Position
New Zealand Albums (RMNZ)	5
US Billboard 200	4

1980 year-end chart performance for The Cars
Chart (1980)	Position
US Billboard 200	48

== Certifications ==
Certifications for The Cars
Region	Certification	Certified units/sales
Australia (ARIA)	2× Platinum	140,000^{^}
Canada (Music Canada)	2× Platinum	200,000^{^}
New Zealand (RMNZ)	Platinum	15,000^{^}
United Kingdom (BPI)	Silver	60,000^{^}
United States (RIAA)	6× Platinum	6,000,000^{^}
^{^} Shipments figures based on certification alone.
