= Good Times Roll =

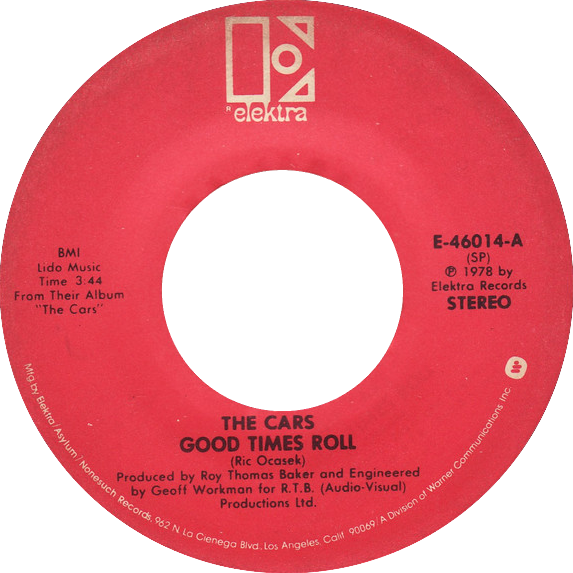
- US single A-side label

Single by the Cars

from the album The Cars
- B-side: "All Mixed Up"
- Released: February 20, 1979
- Recorded: February 1978
- Studio: AIR (London, UK)
- Genre: New wave; power pop; rock and roll
- Length: 3:44
- Label: Elektra 46014
- Songwriter: Ric Ocasek
- Producer: Roy Thomas Baker

The Cars singles chronology
"My Best Friend's Girl" (1978)	"Good Times Roll" (1979)	"Let's Go" (1979)

The Cars track listing
- 9 tracks Side one: 1. "Good Times Roll"; 2. "My Best Friend's Girl"; 3. "Just What I Needed"; 4. "I'm in Touch with Your World"; 5. "Don't Cha Stop"; Side two: 6. "You're All I've Got Tonight"; 7. "Bye Bye Love"; 8. "Moving in Stereo"; 9. "All Mixed Up"

Audio
- "Good Times Roll" on YouTube

"Good Times Roll" is a song by American rock band the Cars from their debut studio album The Cars (1978). Written by Ric Ocasek as a sarcastic comment on rock's idea of good times, the song features layered harmonies courtesy of producer Roy Thomas Baker.

"Good Times Roll" was released as the third single from the album in 1979, charting at number 41 in the United States. It has since received positive critical reception and has appeared on many of the Cars' compilation albums.

== Background ==
Written and sung by Cars lead vocalist and rhythm guitarist Ric Ocasek, "Good Times Roll" was released as the third single from the band's debut album. Ocasek wrote the song as a sarcastic commentary on the good times in rock music, saying, "That was my song about what the good times in rock 'n' roll really mean, instead of what they're supposed to be. It was kind of a parody of good times, really. It was kinda like not about good times at all."

"Good Times Roll," like the rest of the album, was produced by Roy Thomas Baker, who was responsible for the recording's layered harmonies. Ocasek recalled, "I just remember when we did 'Good Times Roll' in the studio in England on the first record, and we heard back the vocals. I told Roy that I thought it was way, way too much. ... But you know, it grew on me later and it sounded so smooth. It was a nice process to do it because Roy, you know, was fortunate enough to have a 40-track machine ... so he could do layering of vocals a lot."

The song begins with electronic drums and a guitar riff, soon joined by Ocasek's lead vocals and synthesizers by keyboardist Greg Hawkes. The song notably features the lyric "Let them brush your rock 'n' roll hair"; when asked if the line was a throwaway, Ocasek replied, "Not in my opinion. It's like 'let them do whatever they want to do.'"

== Release ==
The song was released as the third and final single from The Cars in February 1979, backed with "All Mixed Up". It reached number 41 on the Billboard Hot 100 chart, performing slightly worse than its predecessors "Just What I Needed" and "My Best Friend's Girl".

Of the nine tracks on The Cars, "Good Times Roll" was the only song for which no demo recording could be found during the compilation of the 1999 The Cars: Deluxe Edition package. Instead, a live version of "Good Times Roll" is included alongside demo versions of the other eight tracks.

"Good Times Roll" has been featured on several Cars anthologies, including 1985's Greatest Hits, 1995's Just What I Needed: The Cars Anthology, and 2002's Complete Greatest Hits.

== Reception ==
"Good Times Roll" has generally received positive reviews from critics. Greg Prato of AllMusic described the track as one of the "familiar hits" on The Cars and called it a highlight. Cash Box said it is "a distinctive and impressive track" with "broad chorus and staccato rhythms." The Billboard review of The Cars noted "Good Times Roll" as one of the best cuts, while Jaime Welton, author of 1001 Albums You Must Hear Before You Die, described the track as a "new wave gem". Rolling Stone named the song one of Ocasek's "essential songs", praising the "hard-edged midtempo strut, blaring backing vocals, and Ocasek's stylized singing" in the song. Ultimate Classic Rock named the song the fifth best Cars song, calling it "one of the best side ones, track ones ever." Classic Rock History critic Brian Kachejian rated it as the Cars' 7th greatest song, stating that the "forceful driving beat and loud vocal harmonies hit the listener hard in all its new wave rock and roll glory." The song was also ranked among the band and Ric Ocasek's best by The New York Times, Esquire, and Inquisitr. Billboard felt that the "moody sound" provided a "nice cynical twist" on the good time lyrics.

== Other appearances ==
- "Good Times Roll" has used in the soundtracks of several films, including 2003's Wonderland, 2005's Just Like Heaven and 2016's Everybody Wants Some!!.

== Personnel ==
- Ric Ocasek – lead vocals, rhythm guitar
- Elliot Easton – lead guitar, backing vocals
- Benjamin Orr – backing vocals, bass guitar
- David Robinson – drums, percussion, Syndrums, backing vocals
- Greg Hawkes – keyboards, backing vocals

== Charts ==
Chart performance for "Good Times Roll"
Chart (1979)	Peak position
Canada Top Singles (RPM)	74
US Billboard Hot 100	41
US Cash Box Top 100 Singles	60

== Certifications ==
Region	Certification	Certified units/sales
New Zealand (RMNZ)	Gold	15,000^{‡}
^{‡} Sales+streaming figures based on certification alone.
