= My Best Friend's Girl (song) =

Single by the Cars

from the album The Cars
- B-side: "Don't Cha Stop" (US, Japan); "Moving in Stereo" (Europe)
- Released: October 10, 1978
- Recorded: February 1978
- Studio: AIR (London, UK)
- Genre: New wave; power pop
- Length: 3:43
- Label: Elektra
- Songwriter: Ric Ocasek
- Producer: Roy Thomas Baker

The Cars singles chronology
"Just What I Needed" (1978)	"My Best Friend's Girl" (1978)	"Good Times Roll" (1979)

Music video (live)
- "My Best Friend's Girl" on YouTube

Audio
- "My Best Friend's Girl" on YouTube

"My Best Friend's Girl" is a song by American rock band the Cars from their 1978 eponymous debut studio album on Elektra Records, released on June 6 of that year. Written by Rick Ocasek, the band's guitarist and co-lead singer, as a song about something that "probably happened to a lot of people," the track found radio success in the band's Boston hometown as a demo in 1977, and nationally when re-recorded for their first album.

Produced by Roy Thomas Baker, the song was released as the album's second single. It peaked at number 35 on the U.S. Billboard Hot 100 chart, and reached number three in the UK. It has since been positively received by critics and included in compilation albums for the band.

== Background ==
"My Best Friend's Girl" was written by Ric Ocasek for the Cars' self-titled debut album. Ocasek later said the lyrics were not inspired by any personal incident, saying "Nothing in that song happened to me personally. I just figured having a girlfriend stolen was probably something that happened to a lot of people." Ocasek also said that the lyrics for the chorus were an afterthought, saying, "At some point, I realized my lyrics didn't include the words 'My Best Friend's Girl.' So I pulled out the lyrics someone had typed up and added a chorus in the margin in pen: 'She's my best friend's girl/She's my best friend's girl/But she used to be mine.'"

The song first appeared in 1977 on Boston radio stations WCOZ and WBCN from the demo tape, along with "Just What I Needed". DJ Maxanne Sartori, who was given the tapes of these songs by Ric Ocasek, recalled, "I began playing the demos of 'Just What I Needed' and 'My Best Friend's Girl' in March during my weekday slot, from 2 to 6 p.m. Calls poured in with positive comments." Shortly thereafter, it became one of the stations' most requested songs.

== Composition ==
"My Best Friend's Girl" is a new wave and power pop song with rockabilly elements such as vocal slap-echo and clean electric guitar tone. It begins with chords in the lower register of the guitar, following a two-bar chord progression of F-B♭-C. Handclaps enter in bar five, and after the eight-bar intro (following descending synthesizer sounds from David Robinson's Syndrums), the first verse begins featuring Ric Ocasek's vocals over a lead guitar lick. An electronic piano (a Yamaha CP-30) is introduced in the first chorus, followed by a rockabilly guitar lick which leads to the second verse. The song is composed in contrasting verse-chorus form.

The song was originally written and recorded in E major, one semitone lower, and then the entire master tape was sped up to place it in F major. Many live performances show the band performing the song in E. The lyrics depict a man's frustration with a woman who is dating his best friend after the narrator dated her. The narrator notes, "She's my best friend's girl, but she used to be mine."

== Release ==
Released in October 1978, "My Best Friend's Girl" entered the US Billboard Hot 100 singles chart for the week ending October 21. It peaked at number 35 on the charts in December. In addition, the song reached number 40 on the Dutch Top 40, number 55 in Canada, and number 67 in Australia. The song was the highest-charting UK single of the band's career, peaking at number three in November 1978. The single was the first picture disc available commercially in the UK.

"My Best Friend's Girl" was included on the soundtrack to the film Over the Edge (1979), and the song appears on numerous compilation albums, such as the band's Greatest Hits (1985), Just What I Needed: The Cars Anthology (1995), and Complete Greatest Hits (2002). A live version of the song by the New Cars appears on their debut album, It's Alive! (2006). The song originates from late 1976-early 1977 demo recording, alongside an early version of "Just What I Needed".

== Reception ==
Music critics have given the track generally favorable reviews. Billboard described the song as a "melodic youth-oriented rocker" that uses "catchy handclaps" to generate the feel of an early 1960s song. Cash Box said that "the guitar work is derivative but the enthusiasm is refreshing" and praised the vocals and organ playing. AllMusic's Donald A. Guarisco called the song "one of the classics of the Cars' catalog", and Rolling Stone writer Kit Rachlis called it a wonderful pop song. Classic Rock History critic Brian Kachejian rated it as the Cars' 6th greatest song, praising Elliot Easton's opening guitar riff and saying that "The song has such a happy, good-time feel; you would think it’s a song about being happy in love when it’s really all about seeing one’s ex-girlfriend with the guy’s best friend."

"My Best Friend's Girl" was ranked the 12th best song of 1978 by critics Dave Marsh and Kevin Stein, and it was named one of "The 1001 Best Songs Ever" in a 2003 issue of Q magazine. Some critics have noted the similarity in style of Fountains of Wayne's 2003 hit single "Stacy's Mom" to this song.

== Track listing ==
7" vinyl

1. "My Best Friend's Girl" (Ocasek) – 3:44
2. "Moving in Stereo" (Hawkes, Ocasek) – 5:15

== Personnel ==
- Ric Ocasek – lead vocals, rhythm guitar
- Elliot Easton – lead guitar, backing vocals
- Benjamin Orr – backing vocals, bass guitar
- David Robinson – drums, percussion, Syndrums, backing vocals
- Greg Hawkes – keyboards, saxophone, backing vocals

== Charts ==
=== Weekly charts ===
Weekly chart performance for "My Best Friend's Girl"
Chart (1978–1979)	Peak position
Australia (Kent Music Report)	67
Canada Top Singles (RPM)	55
Netherlands (Dutch Top 40)	28
Netherlands (Single Top 100)	40
UK Singles (Official Charts)	3
US Billboard Hot 100	35
US Cash Box Top 100 Singles	44

=== Year-end charts ===
Year-end chart performance for "My Best Friend's Girl"
Chart (1978)	Position
US (Joel Whitburn's Pop Annual)	204

== Certifications ==
Region	Certification	Certified units/sales
New Zealand (RMNZ)	Platinum	30,000^{‡}
^{‡} Sales+streaming figures based on certification alone.
