= Crooked X =

American rock band

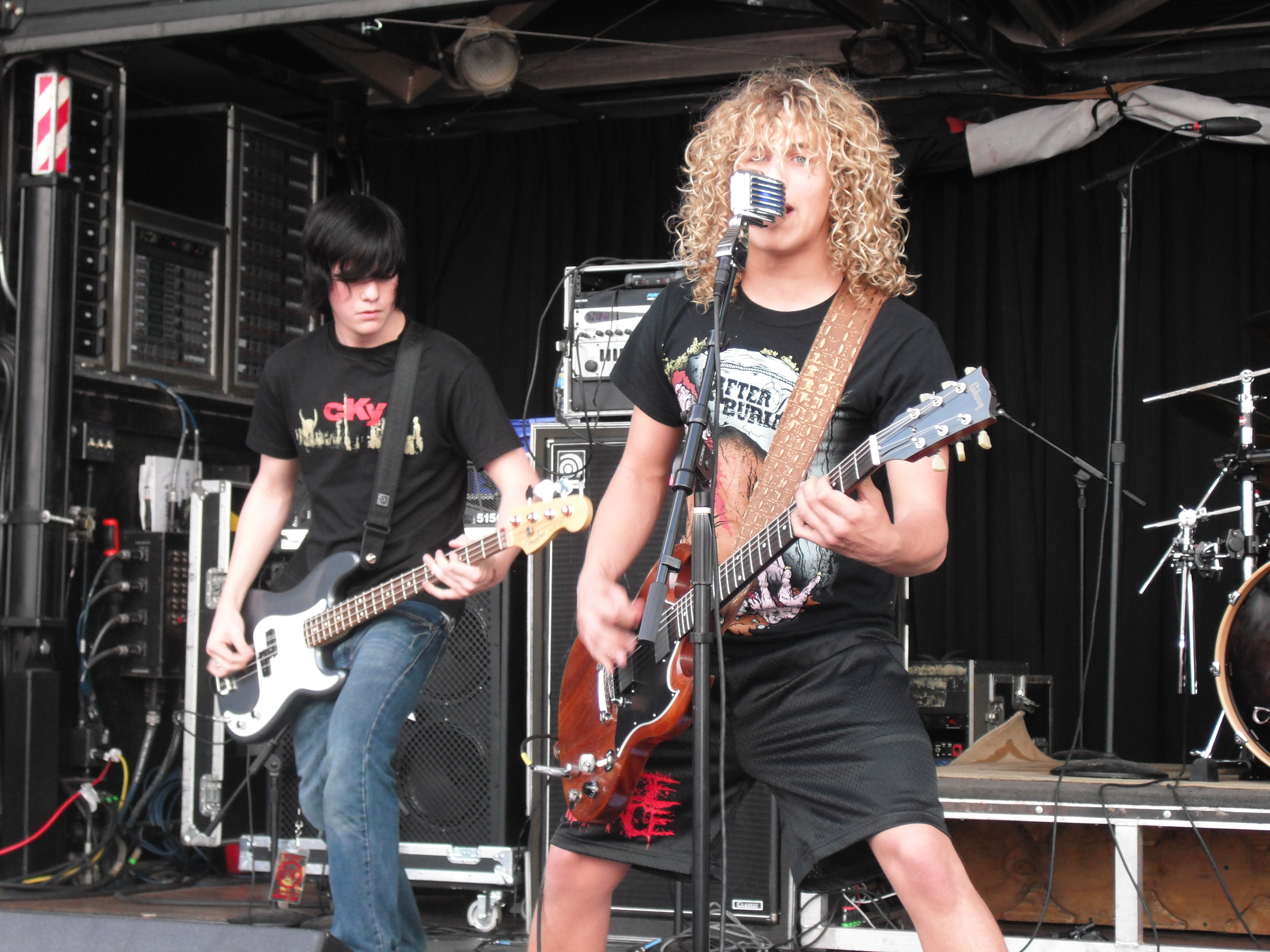
- Josh McDowell (left) and Forrest French perform in 2009

Background information
- Origin: Coweta, Oklahoma, United States
- Genres: Hard rock, heavy metal
- Years active: 2007–2011
- Label: EMI America
- Past members: Josh McDowell; Forrest French; Kevin Currie; Jesse Cooper; Boomer Simpson; Bradd Johnson

Crooked X was a hard rock band from Coweta, Oklahoma, U.S., consisting of members Forrest French (lead vocals/lead guitar), Jesse Cooper (lead guitar/backing vocals), Boomer Simpson (drums, backing vocals), and Josh McDowell (bass guitar). The band is now defunct and has not performed since 2011. The band struggled to find further success after founding members Forrest French (lead vocals/rhythm guitar) and Josh McDowell (bass guitar) left the band in 2010 to finish high school.

== Biography ==
After practicing and writing music in a garage, Crooked X submitted a video of themselves for a segment entitled "Living Room Live" on the CBS morning TV show The Early Show. After coming in second place, the band gained the attention of music industry entrepreneurs Spencer Proffer and Doc McGhee (Kiss, Mötley Crüe, Bon Jovi), who signed Crooked X to their band management company MPM (McGhee Proffer Media). MPM got the band signed with EMI and Capitol Records and secured spots for the band to open for Kiss, Ted Nugent, Alice Cooper, Black Stone Cherry and Skid Row. On January 15, 2009, they performed a two-song set on Jimmy Kimmel Live!.

The band gained heavy attention by having their songs featured in the music video game series Rock Band. "Nightmare" was first featured in Rock Band, after which "Rock 'N' Roll Dream" and "Gone", respectively, were made available as downloadable content for the series. Spencer and Doc produced a TV-special on the band titled Rock N' Roll Dream that showing the band's progression from four young boys in a garage to opening for Kiss in front of 35,000 fans in Stockholm, Sweden.

Crooked X's debut EP Till We Bleed was released on iTunes on October 7, 2008 followed by a self-titled album on January 27, 2009, - the same day the band's special Rock 'N' Roll Dream aired on MTV. The band spent the spring of 2009 performing on the Music as a Weapon IV Tour on the Ernie Ball side stage alongside Spineshank, Suicide Silence, Bury Your Dead and others.

In June 2010, Crooked X parted ways with original members Forrest French, Tyler Daniels, and Josh McDowell. The band replaced them with Kevin Currie on vocals and Bradd Johnson on bass, but the change did not go over well with fans and interest in the band waned. The new incarnation of the band recorded no new music and quit performing in 2011.

Guitarist Jesse Cooper died in 2015.

== Discography ==
Albums/EPs

Year	Album	Peak	
Year	Album	US	Heat
2008	Till We Bleed EP	—	—
2009	Crooked X	176	6

Singles

Year	Title	Peak	Album
Year	Title	US Rock	Album
2008	"Rock N Roll Dream"	40	Till We Bleed EP / Crooked X
2009	"Gone"	—	Crooked X
2009	"Another Brick, Pt. 2 (Radio Edit)"	—	Another Brick In The Wall EP
