= Crooked X (album) =

Studio album by Crooked X
- Released: January 27, 2009
- Genres: Hard rock, heavy metal
- Length: 37:00
- Label: Capitol

Crooked X chronology
Till We Bleed (2008)	Crooked X (2009)

Singles from Crooked X
- 1. "Gone" Released: March 24, 2009

Professional ratings
Review scores
Source	Rating
AbsolutePunk.net	8.5/10 stars
The Dwarf	(Mixed)
Metal Storm	7/10 stars

Crooked X is the first and only album by heavy metal band Crooked X, released in January 2009 by Capitol Metal. The band's musicians were all 14 years of age when the album was released, but tracks were written when members were as young as 11 (for example, "Nightmare"). "Nightmare" is featured in the music video game Rock Band, while "Gone" and "Rock 'N' Roll Dream" are featured as downloadable content for the Rock Band series.

== Track listing ==
No.	Title	Length
1.	"Gone"	4:27
2.	"Adrenaline"	2:46
3.	"Time Is Now"	4:08
4.	"Rock 'N' Roll Dream"	3:23
5.	"Fade"	4:20
6.	"You Gotta Bleed"	3:04
7.	"Nail In The Coffin"	4:34
8.	"Nightmare"	3:45
9.	"Death Of Me"	3:31
10.	"Lost Control"	3:09
Total length:		37:00

== Credits ==
=== Band ===
- Boomer Simpson - Drums, Backing Vocals
- Forrest French - Lead Vocals, Guitar
- Jesse Cooper - Guitar, Backing Vocals
- Josh McDowell - Bass
