= The New Cars =

New wave band from the United States (2005–2007)

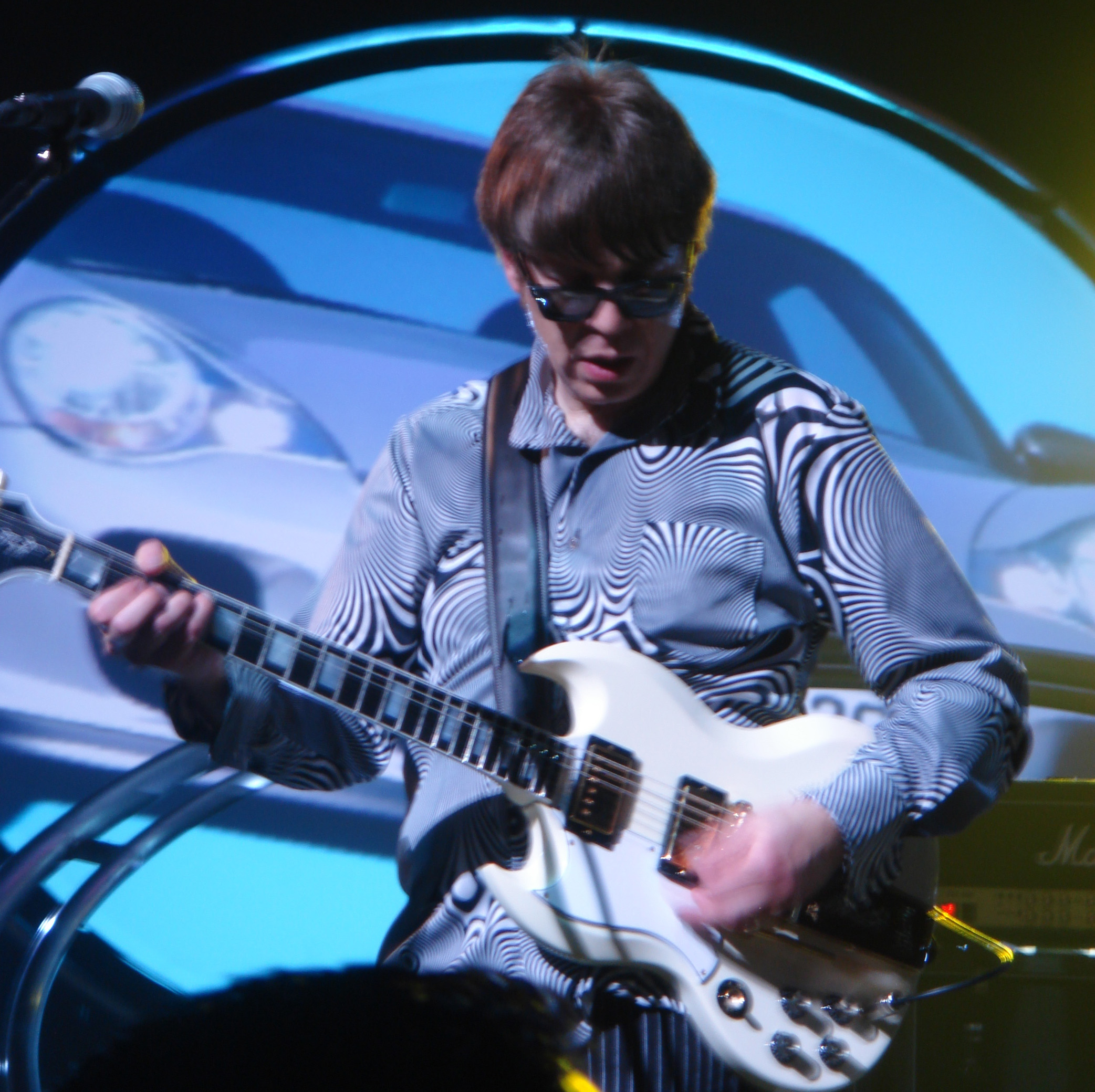
- Elliot Easton performing with the New Cars in 2006

Background information
- Origin: Boston, Massachusetts, U.S.
- Genres: Rock; power pop; new wave
- Years active: 2005–2007
- Label: Eleven Seven Music
- Past members: Elliot Easton; Greg Hawkes; Todd Rundgren; Kasim Sulton; Prairie Prince

The New Cars were a band formed in 2005 by two of the original members of the 1970s/1980s new wave band the Cars. The band was composed of original Cars members Elliot Easton and Greg Hawkes, along with vocalist/guitarist Todd Rundgren, bassist/vocalist Kasim Sulton, and drummer Prairie Prince. The band performed the Cars' songs, some new material, and selections from Rundgren's career.

== History ==
In 2005, rumors circulated that Easton and Hawkes would be teaming with Todd Rundgren in a new Cars lineup, with Rundgren replacing the Cars' original vocalists Ric Ocasek and Benjamin Orr. The rumors turned out to be true, with the revamped lineup calling themselves the New Cars. Two regular Rundgren collaborators, bassist Kasim Sulton and drummer Prairie Prince, replaced bassist Benjamin Orr and drummer David Robinson in the new lineup. Robinson, who had retired from the music industry years before, was invited to join the group but amicably declined. Ocasek, who had opted out of any possibilities of a reunion, gave his blessing to Easton and Hawkes, saying, "I want Elliot and Greg to be happy." On April 17, 2006, when Ocasek appeared on The Colbert Report and was asked if there was anyone he wanted to put "on notice", he answered "Todd Rundgren".

On March 20, 2006, the New Cars released a new original single, "Not Tonight", on Eleven Seven Music. On May 9, 2006, they released an album, It's Alive!, also on Eleven Seven Music. The album contained 18 tracks, consisting of 15 live recordings (12 classic Cars songs, the new single "Not Tonight", and 2 Todd Rundgren songs), plus 3 new original studio tracks. Rundgren referred to the project as "an opportunity... for me to pay my bills, play to a larger audience, work with musicians I know and like, and ideally have some fun for a year".

In 2010, all four still-living original members of The Cars reunited for a new studio album and tour.

== Tour ==
The band's first tour, the summer Road Rage Tour with Blondie, kicked off May 12, 2006, in Mississippi.

The spring leg of the 2006 tour had to be cut short because Easton had broken his collarbone on June 5 and was playing in great pain. Despite the fact that the accompanying album had sold only 16,000 units, a winter leg of the tour ran from November through early December. The tour, titled Road Rage Winter Tour, was a theatre tour of venues which were much smaller than their previous arena tour.

== Post-2007 activity ==
The New Cars played their last concert in September 2007. Rundgren resumed his solo career, and his 2009 solo tour featured Kasim Sulton, Prairie Prince and Greg Hawkes as members of his backing band. A Rundgren tour in 2010 featured band members Kasim Sulton and Prairie Prince. Rundgren joined Ringo Starr & His All-Starr Band in 2012. In 2010, Hawkes and Easton reunited with surviving Cars members Ric Ocasek and David Robinson for an album and tour.

Several years later, when Rundgren was asked how he would characterize his time with the New Cars, he replied, "Bittersweet. You know, we all put a lot of effort into it, but we got practically nothing out of it but aggravation."

== Band members ==
Former members

- Todd Rundgren – lead and backing vocals, rhythm guitar
- Elliot Easton – lead guitar, backing vocals
- Greg Hawkes – keyboards, backing vocals
- Kasim Sulton – bass, backing and lead vocals
- Prairie Prince – drums, percussion

Touring member

- Atom Ellis – bass, backing vocals (substitute 2007)

== Discography ==
=== Album ===
Date	Album	Label
May 9, 2006	It's Alive!	Eleven Seven Music #4607000512

=== Single ===
Date	Single	Label
March 20, 2006	"Not Tonight"	Eleven Seven Music
