= Bye Bye Love (The Cars song) =

Song by the Cars

from the album The Cars
- Released: June 6, 1978
- Genre: New wave
- Length: 4:14
- Label: Elektra
- Songwriter: Ric Ocasek
- Producer: Roy Thomas Baker

The Cars track listing
- 9 tracks Side one: 1. "Good Times Roll"; 2. "My Best Friend's Girl"; 3. "Just What I Needed"; 4. "I'm in Touch with Your World"; 5. "Don't Cha Stop"; Side two: 6. "You're All I've Got Tonight"; 7. "Bye Bye Love"; 8. "Moving in Stereo"; 9. "All Mixed Up"

Audio
- "Bye Bye Love" on YouTube

"Bye Bye Love" is a song by the American Boston-based rock band the Cars. The song appears on the band's debut studio album The Cars (1978). It was written by bandleader Ric Ocasek and sung by bassist Benjamin Orr. The song was featured in the 2011 science-fiction film Super 8.

== Background ==
"Bye Bye Love" is one of The Cars' oldest songs, dating back to the mid-1970s. The song was first performed, and recorded as a demo, by the band Cap'n Swing, which featured Ocasek, Orr, and guitarist Elliot Easton as members. In this early version, the recurring keyboard theme between the verse lyrics was significantly different.

The song was later revived to appear on The Cars in 1978. Although the song was not released as a single, it has received regular airplay since the album was released.

== Reception ==
Rolling Stone critic Kit Rachlis said in his review of The Cars that "the songs bristle and -- in their harsher, more angular moments ('Bye Bye Love,' 'Don't Cha Stop') -- bray." Jaime Welton, author of 1001 Albums You Must Hear Before You Die, described the track as a "fan favorite", praising Elliot Easton as an "unsung hero, littering songs like 'Bye Bye Love' with staggeringly good fills." AllMusic critic Greg Prato called it one of the "lesser-known compositions [that] are just as exhilarating" as the "familiar hits" on The Cars. Ultimate Classic Rock critic Dave Swanson rated it as the 5th best Benjamin Orr Cars song, saying that it shares the "same great pop spirit" as the Everly Brothers' song with the same title. Warrant's song "Down Boys" is heavily influenced by the song's structure.

The tribute album Substitution Mass Confusion: A Tribute to The Cars takes its name from a line in the song.
