= Pollard Syndrum =

Electronic drum

The Pollard Syndrum is the first commercially available electronic drum, invented by Joe Pollard and Mark Barton in 1976. There were 3 major types: The Syndrum 1, the Syndrum TwinDrum, and the Syndrum Quad, the last being the most famous.

At the time of its conception, Pollard was a session drummer working for the Beach Boys and the Grass Roots. In 1976, he met Barton, who had designed and built some working prototypes which were previewed to some prominent drummers. Their reactions were encouraging, so Joe, Mark and Donald Stone incorporated Pollard Industries and starting selling Syndrums in Culver City, California. There were two models sold at the time, the single drum 177 and the four drum 477. Syndrums were a musical success with a surplus of endorsees, but a financial failure for the young company.

== Legacy ==
Although the Syndrum was capable of many different sounds, the one favored by most recording artists was a sine wave that pitch-bends down; it can be heard at the beginning of "Good Times Roll", the opening track of the Cars' 1978 debut album, and on numerous disco hits of the era, including “Ring My Bell” by Anita Ward, “Knock on Wood” by Amii Stewart, and “The Second Time Around” by Shalamar.

The Syndrum was played on Linda Ronstadt’s 1978 single “Poor Poor Pitiful Me” by Rick Marotta, and Gerry Rafferty’s hit single “Baker Street” by Henry Spinetti. It appeared throughout Sparks' 1979 album No.1 in Heaven, particularly the opening track "Tryouts for the Human Race" and "The Number One Song in Heaven", and the percussion break of "Rydeen" by Yellow Magic Orchestra. Joy Division also used it on their debut album Unknown Pleasures. American post-punk band Flipper used the Syndrum on their recordings of "Sex Bomb". After the Syndrum’s introduction to the marketplace, several companies produced electronic drum units, such as the Synare.
