= Just What I Needed =

1978 single by The Cars

- US picture sleeve

Single by the Cars

from the album The Cars
- B-side: "I'm in Touch with Your World"
- Released: May 29, 1978
- Recorded: February 1978
- Studio: AIR (London, UK)
- Genre: Power pop; pop rock; new wave
- Length: 3:44
- Label: Elektra
- Songwriter: Ric Ocasek
- Producer: Roy Thomas Baker

The Cars singles chronology
"Just What I Needed" (1978)	"My Best Friend's Girl" (1978)

The Cars track listing
- 9 tracks Side one: 1. "Good Times Roll"; 2. "My Best Friend's Girl"; 3. "Just What I Needed"; 4. "I'm in Touch with Your World"; 5. "Don't Cha Stop"; Side two: 6. "You're All I've Got Tonight"; 7. "Bye Bye Love"; 8. "Moving in Stereo"; 9. "All Mixed Up"

Audio
- "Just What I Needed" on YouTube

"Just What I Needed" is a song by American rock band the Cars from their self-titled debut album (1978). The song, which first achieved radio success as a demo, took inspiration from the Ohio Express and the Velvet Underground. The song was written by lead singer and rhythm guitarist Ric Ocasek and sung by bassist Benjamin Orr.

"Just What I Needed" was released as the band's first single in 1978, reaching number 27 on the US Billboard Hot 100 and charting in several other countries. Appearing on numerous compilation albums, it has become one of the band's most popular songs and has been received positively by critics.

== Background ==
Like several other tracks on the album The Cars, "Just What I Needed" originated as a demo tape recorded by the band in 1977. Ocasek had originally written the song in the basement of the commune he lived in at the time. Cars keyboardist Greg Hawkes recalled the first time he heard the song in an interview, saying, "I remember hearing 'Just What I Needed,' thinking ... 'Wow, that's pretty cool. It's got something sort of unique about it, it's, like, nice and concise and ... fairly short pop song format' ... so I still remember hearing that for the first time."

The song first appeared in 1977 on Boston radio stations WCOZ and WBCN from the demo tape, along with its future follow-up single "My Best Friend's Girl". DJ Maxanne Sartori, who was given the tapes of these songs by Ocasek, recalled, "I began playing the demos of 'Just What I Needed' and 'My Best Friend's Girl' in March during my weekday slot, from 2 to 6 p.m. Calls poured in with positive comments." Shortly thereafter, it became one of the stations' most requested songs.

Guitarist Elliot Easton has since named "Just What I Needed" as the band's signature song. When asked what his favorite Cars song was, Easton commented, "On some level I think I'd pick 'Just What I Needed' as our [overall] best. It's our song. You expect the Beatles to perform 'I Wanna Hold Your Hand,' and you expect the Cars to play 'Just What I Needed.'"

== Composition ==
"Just What I Needed" is a new wave and power pop song, described as having a "hard rock punch". The song's opening riff was borrowed from "Yummy Yummy Yummy" by the Ohio Express. It also features a prominent keyboard riff performed by Greg Hawkes. The lyric "wasting all my time-time" is a reference to "Sister Ray" by the Velvet Underground, a band Ocasek credited as one of his favorites. The song was sung by the Cars' bassist Benjamin Orr, in a performance that Ultimate Classic Rock described as "perfect."

Classic Rock History critic Emily Fagan described the lyrics as exploring "themes of romantic indifference and attraction through its catchy, somewhat ironic chorus: 'I guess you’re just what I needed, I needed someone to bleed.'" Fagan felt that the lyrics are relatable to listeners because they "convey a sense of ennui and detachment, yet they’re delivered with a palpable sense of engagement."

In 2003, pop rock band Fountains of Wayne would in turn copy the Cars' take on the riff for their song "Stacy's Mom". This prompted Ric Ocasek to say the opening was a sample; however, the band has insisted they "got it right".

The cover has the same photo as the cover of The Cars, though cropped differently, and features singer and model Nataliya Medvedeva.

== Release ==
"Just What I Needed" was released as a single in 1978 prior to the release of The Cars, backed with "I'm in Touch with Your World". The song peaked at number 27 on the US Billboard Hot 100 and number 17 on the UK Singles Chart, as well as number 38 in New Zealand. The single was the Cars' most successful of the songs on The Cars in the United States, with follow-up singles "My Best Friend's Girl" and "Good Times Roll" charting at numbers 35 and 41, respectively.

"Just What I Needed" appeared on multiple compilation albums, among them being Greatest Hits, Just What I Needed: The Cars Anthology, Shake It Up & Other Hits, Complete Greatest Hits, The Essentials, and Classic Tracks. It appeared on the soundtracks for the films Boys Don’t Cry, Over the Edge and 200 Cigarettes. The song was also featured in an advertising campaign by Circuit City in 2004. "Just What I Needed" has since been covered by several artists, including by the Strokes with Jarvis Cocker in 2011, the Killers in 2018, and the Red Hot Chili Peppers in 2019. In 2016, American rock band Car Seat Headrest interpolated "Just What I Needed" into their own song "Just What I Needed/Not Just What I Needed" for their album Teens Of Denial; however, Ric Ocasek prohibited the band from using the song due to a lyrical change, leading to the creation of "Not What I Needed" and the recall and destruction of a considerable amount of Teens Of Denial CDs and vinyl records.

== Critical reception ==
AllMusic reviewer Donald A. Guarisco praised it as "a clever pop song", commenting that "Elliot Easton's fiery guitar leads duel with Greg Hawkes' icy synth lines over a throbbing pop/rock backbeat while Benjamin Orr lays down a fey, detached vocal that captures the sarcastic edge of the lyrics with skill." Billboard said that it was energized by a "driving, propulsive beat" and enhanced by "feisty rock guitar lines" and "a winning harmonic vocal style." Cash Box said that "the ticking guitar opening is reminiscent of Tommy James & The Shondells and that "the tight-lick guitar work and excellent singing" make it likely to go to the top of pop music playlists. Record World said that "Roy Thomas Baker's production and the group's lively vocals makes the record a standout." Rolling Stone named the song one of Ocasek's "essential songs", praising the "chugging eighth-note guitars marching along in crisp perfection" in the song.

Ultimate Classic Rock named the song the best Cars song as well as the best Benjamin Orr Cars song, saying "On a near-perfect debut album, the Roy Thomas Baker-produced "Just What I Needed" was a near-perfect song." The site also ranked it the 35th best classic rock song of all time. Classic Rock History critic Brian Kachejian rated it as the Cars' 2nd greatest song, describing it as "a combination of Benjamin Orr’s original-sounding voice, Greg Hawkes’ fascinating keyboards, Elliot Easton’s sparkling guitar, and that rock meets dance meets punk groove set up so perfectly in the rhythm section of Benjamin Orr and David Robinson." Fagan rated it as the Cars best song sung by Orr, praising Orr's "effortlessly cool and quintessentially rock 'n' roll" vocal delivery. The song was also ranked among the band and Ocasek's best by The New York Times, NME, Esquire, and Inquisitr.

In 2021, Rolling Stone added "Just What I Needed" to their list of "500 Greatest Songs of All Time," ranking it at 369 and writing that the song "defined [the band's] mix of precision-tuned sleekness and creepy mystery."

Weezer frontman Rivers Cuomo singled out the song as the reason for selecting Ocasek to be the band's producer for their debut album, recalling, "One day I was in the grocery store and I heard 'Just What I Needed'. I was like, 'Yeah that's kind of what I want the Weezer record to sound like. So let's get that guy."

Australian solo artist Aodhan notably covered this song on Triple J's 'Like a Version' in 2021.

Nicholas Petricca has credited this song as a major inspiration for writing his band Walk the Moon's hit "Shut Up and Dance".

== Personnel ==
- Benjamin Orr – lead vocals, bass guitar
- Elliot Easton – lead guitar, backing vocals
- Ric Ocasek – rhythm guitar, backing vocals
- Greg Hawkes – ARP Omni, Yamaha CP-30, Korg MiniKorg, backing vocals
- David Robinson – drums, percussion

== Charts ==
=== Weekly charts ===
1978–1979 weekly chart performance for "Just What I Needed"
Chart (1978–1979)	Peak position
Australia (Kent Music Report)	96
Canada Top Singles (RPM)	38
Ireland (IRMA)	27
New Zealand (Recorded Music NZ)	38
UK Singles (Official Charts)	17
US Billboard Hot 100	27
US Cash Box Top 100 Singles	24

2019 weekly chart performance for "Just What I Needed"
Chart (2019)	Peak position
US Hot Rock & Alternative Songs (Billboard)	9

=== Year-end charts ===
Year-end chart performance for "Just What I Needed"
Chart (1978)	Position
US (Joel Whitburn's Pop Annual)	169

== Certifications ==
Region	Certification	Certified units/sales
New Zealand (RMNZ)	Platinum	30,000^{‡}
^{‡} Sales+streaming figures based on certification alone.
