= Moving in Stereo =

Song by the Cars

from the album The Cars
- Released: June 6, 1978
- Recorded: February 1978
- Studio: AIR (London, UK)
- Genre: New wave; experimental; art rock
- Length: 4:43
- Label: Elektra
- Songwriters: Ric Ocasek; Greg Hawkes
- Producer: Roy Thomas Baker

The Cars track listing
- 9 tracks Side one: 1. "Good Times Roll"; 2. "My Best Friend's Girl"; 3. "Just What I Needed"; 4. "I'm in Touch with Your World"; 5. "Don't Cha Stop"; Side two: 6. "You're All I've Got Tonight"; 7. "Bye Bye Love"; 8. "Moving in Stereo"; 9. "All Mixed Up"

Audio
- "Moving in Stereo" on YouTube

"Moving in Stereo" is a song by the American rock band the Cars. It appeared on their debut studio album, The Cars (1978). It was co-written by Ric Ocasek and the band's keyboard player Greg Hawkes, and sung by bassist Benjamin Orr.

== Reception ==
Although not released as a single, except in the UK where it was the B-side of "My Best Friend's Girl", "Moving in Stereo" received airplay on album-oriented rock radio stations in the United States, often coupled with the song "All Mixed Up" which it segues into on the album. The song continues to receive airplay on classic rock radio stations.

Donald A. Guarisco of AllMusic described the song as "one of the Cars' finest experimental tracks," noting that it "sounds like a new wave update of Eno-era Roxy Music." Classic Rock History critic Brian Kachejian rated "Moving in Stereo" combined with "All Mixed Up" as released on the album as the Cars' all-time greatest song. Classic Rock History critic Emily Fagan rated it as the Cars' 7th best song sung by Orr, saying that it "captures a sense of disorientation and ennui, with Orr delivering lyrics that seem to drift between reality and a dreamlike state." Ultimate Classic Rock critic Dave Swanson rated it as the 4th best Benjamin Orr Cars song, stating that "the atmospheric mood of the track puts the listener in a late night, post-psychedelic haze."

A demo version recorded in 1977, featuring only Ocasek and Hawkes, was released on The Cars: Deluxe Edition in 1999.

== Cover versions ==
- Fu Manchu on their tenth studio album We Must Obey.
- Byzantine on their 2017 album The Cicada Tree.

== In other media ==
An instrumental portion of "Moving in Stereo" was used prominently in the 1982 feature film Fast Times at Ridgemont High, in which it accompanies Judge Reinhold's character's fantasy of Phoebe Cates's character removing her bikini top while embracing him. Although the song was popularized in the movie, it was not included on the soundtrack album.

"Moving in Stereo" was one of the last songs Nirvana played live.

"Moving in Stereo" featured in the Stranger Things season 3 soundtrack.
