= Greg Hawkes =

American musician (born 1952)

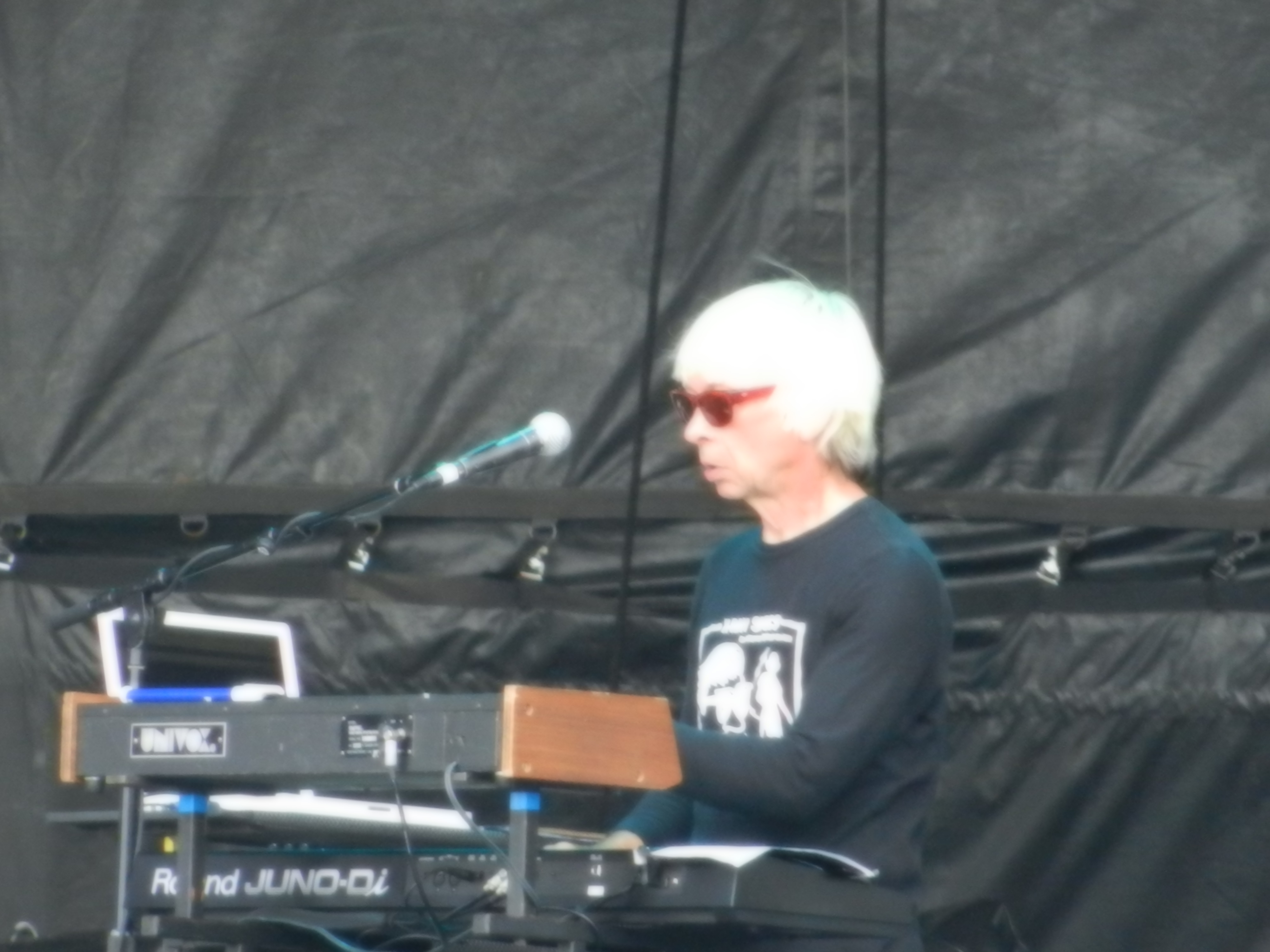
- Hawkes performing with the Cars at Lollapalooza in Chicago, 2011

Background information
- Born: Gregory A. Hawkes; October 22, 1952 (age 73); Fulton, Maryland, U.S.
- Genres: New wave; power pop; pop rock; electronic rock
- Occupations: Musician; composer
- Instruments: Keyboards; bass guitar; guitar; saxophone; ukulele; vocals
- Years active: 1969–present
- Formerly of: Teeth; Martin Mull and his Fabulous Furniture; Richard and the Rabbits; The Cars; Sky Dwellers; The New Cars

Gregory A. Hawkes (born October 22, 1952) is an American musician and composer who is most notable as a founding member and the keyboardist of the American new wave band the Cars.

Hawkes has also played in various bands, including Martin Mull and his Fabulous Furniture and Richard and the Rabbits. He was the last band member to join the Cars. Hawkes is credited with helping popularize new wave and synth-pop in American popular music through his work with the Cars. In 2018, Hawkes was inducted into the Rock and Roll Hall of Fame as a member of the Cars.

Hawkes was also a member of the New Cars. He has done solo musical work and has worked as a session musician.

== Early life, education, and early career ==
Hawkes was born on October 22, 1952. A native of Fulton, Maryland, he attended Atholton High School, where he played in a band called Teeth. He then attended Berklee College of Music for two years, majoring in composition and flute. He left college to play in various bands, including Martin Mull and his Fabulous Furniture, in which he played flute, saxophone, and clarinet. He also played in a band called Richard and the Rabbits, which included future Cars bandmates Ric Ocasek and Benjamin Orr.

== The Cars ==
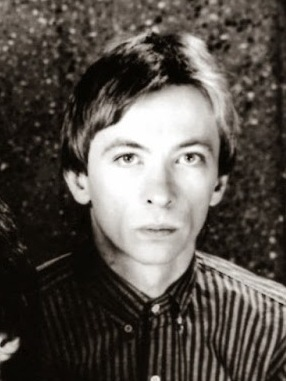
Hawkes in 1984

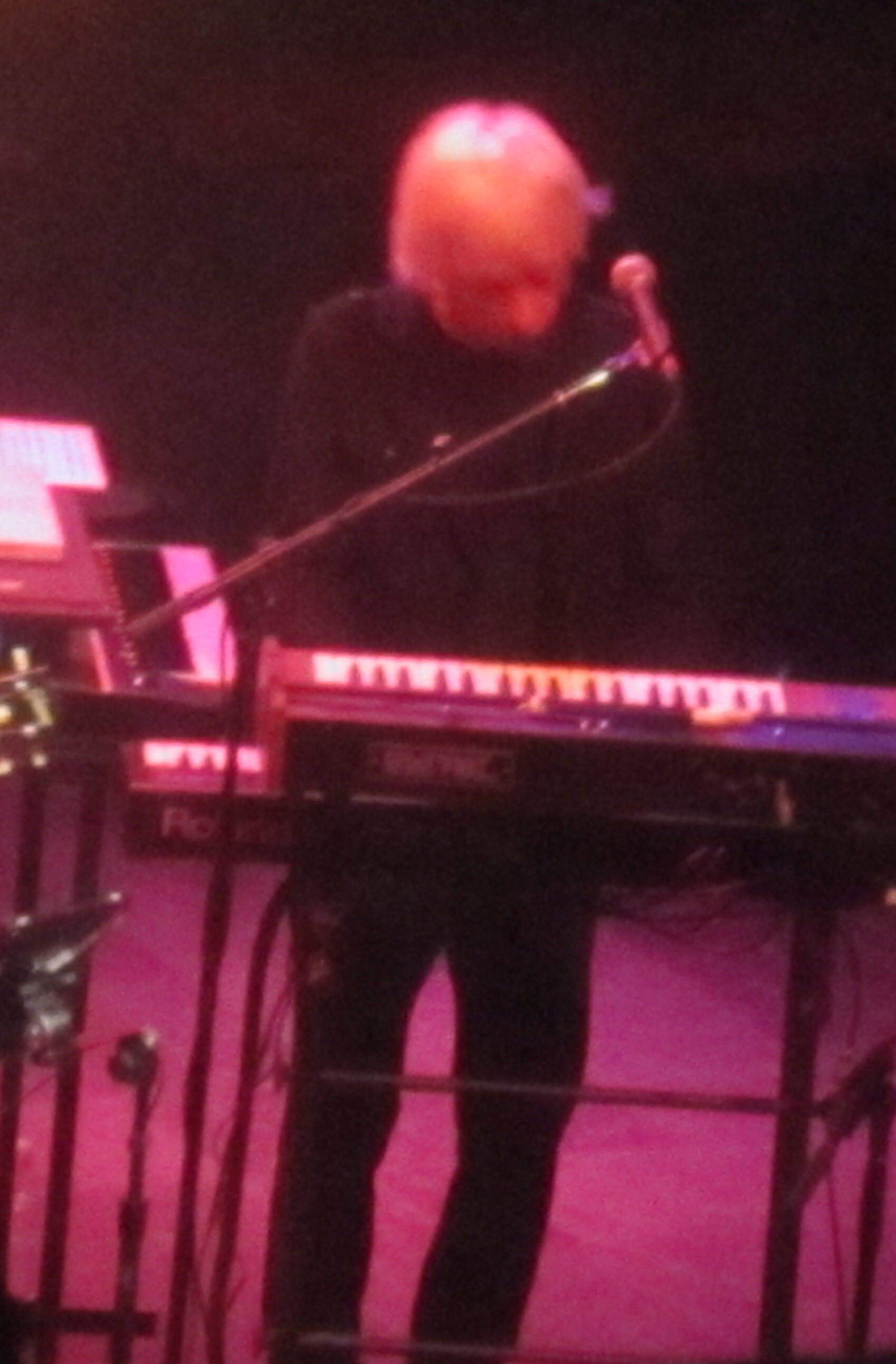
Hawkes performing with the Cars at the Riviera Theatre in Chicago, 2011

Hawkes is most notable for his work as a keyboardist for the Cars. He was the last member of the classic lineup to join the band. Hawkes is credited with helping popularize new wave and synth-pop in American popular music as a member of the Cars. His signature sounds include the Prophet-5 "sync" sound heard on "Let's Go" and "Hello Again" as well as arpeggiated and syncopated synth lines such as on "Shake it Up" and "Heartbeat City".

In 2010, Hawkes reunited with the surviving original members of the Cars to record their first studio album in 24 years, Move Like This, which was released on May 10, 2011.

In 2018, Hawkes was inducted into the Rock and Roll Hall of Fame as a member of the Cars.

== Other endeavors ==
Hawkes also played with Ric Ocasek as a solo artist, often playing both keyboards and bass guitar.

Hawkes received a writing credit for "Service with a Smile" on Virginia-based progressive rock band Happy the Man's second studio album, Crafty Hands, in 1978.

He released a solo studio album, Niagara Falls, in May 1983.

In 1989, Chris Hughes asked Hawkes to come to England to record a new Paul McCartney song. He was featured on "Motor of Love" from the Flowers in the Dirt album, recorded at McCartney's own recording studio in a vintage windmill just south of London.

In 1995, Hawkes was a member of the Sky Dwellers, which also included Perry Geyer of Manufacture.

Since 2001, Hawkes has been playing and experimenting with the ukulele, including renditions of the Cars' songs "My Best Friend's Girl", "Drive", "Tonight She Comes" and "You Might Think". In 2008, he released The Beatles Uke CD on Solid Air Records. The album consists of instrumental versions of 15 Beatles songs, in what he calls a "UKEsymphonic" style, using multi-tracked recordings to create a ukulele orchestra. Among other instruments, Hawkes owns and plays a Talsma custom ukulele.

Hawkes was a member of the New Cars, a quasi-reformation of the Cars that also featured original guitarist Elliot Easton. Filling in for other original Cars members were singer and guitarist Todd Rundgren, Utopia bassist and vocalist Kasim Sulton, and former Tubes drummer Prairie Prince. Atom Ellis filled in on bass guitar when Sulton was touring with Meat Loaf. The band toured throughout 2006–2007. A live album with three new studio tracks, It's Alive!, was released in June 2006.

In 2009, Hawkes contributed synthesizers to several tracks on the studio album Invisible Embraces by Boston-based new wave band New Collisions.

Before the Cars briefly reunited in 2010, Hawkes played with the Turtles featuring Flo & Eddie and Todd Rundgren.

On May 8, 2014, Hawkes appeared onstage with Californian comedy rock and new wave band the Aquabats at Boston's Paradise Rock Club, where he joined the band in playing synthesizer for a cover version of the Cars' "Just What I Needed".

In 2016, Hawkes produced Boston rock band Eddie Japan's studio album Golden Age (2017). In 2017 and 2018, he joined the band to perform "Moving in Stereo", "Bye Bye Love", "Let's Go", and other cover songs at multiple shows. Starting in 2019 and continuing through 2025, Hawkes and Eddie Japan have performed a full night of the Cars' music throughout the North East and Mid Atlantic regions.

In 2017, Hawkes toured with Todd Rundgren on his White Knights: The Chivalrock Tour, playing keyboards and saxophone.

Hawkes also appeared on the children's musical animated television series Yo Gabba Gabba!, in segments that instructed viewers on how to play certain instruments. In one appearance in which he taught viewers to play the ukulele, he performed the Cars' hit single "You Might Think".

Hawkes also plays guitar, percussion instruments, saxophone, and clarinet.

== Personal life ==
Hawkes lives in Lincoln, Massachusetts, where he works as a session musician. He is married and has two children.

== Discography ==
=== Solo albums ===
- Niagara Falls (1983)
- The Beatles Uke (2008)

=== With the Cars ===
- The Cars (1978)
- Candy-O (1979)
- Panorama (1980)
- Shake It Up (1981)
- Heartbeat City (1984)
- Door to Door (1987)
- Move Like This (2011)

=== Solo singles ===
- "Jet Lag" (1983)
- "Backseat Waltz" (1983)
