= Kit Rachlis =

American journalist and editor

- Born: Christopher Rachlis; Paris, France
- Education: Yale University (BA)
- Occupation: Editor
- Spouse(s): Ariel Swartley (divorced) Amy Albert
- Children: 1

Kit Rachlis is an American journalist and editor who has held posts at The Village Voice, LA Weekly, Los Angeles Times, Los Angeles magazine, The American Prospect, The California Sunday Magazine, and currently ProPublica.

Rachlis has been described as a practitioner of the long-form nonfiction narrative. Writers working under his guidance have been awarded a number of prizes, including the Pulitzer. In addition, he has edited more than a dozen books, including The Color of Law by Richard Rothstein.

== Early life and family ==
Rachlis is the son of Eugene Rachlis, an author, book publisher, and magazine editor, and Mary Katherine (Mickey) Rachlis, an economics correspondent for the Journal of Commerce who wrote under the byline M.K. Sharp. He was born in Paris, France, where his father was serving as press attaché for the Marshall Plan, and raised in New York City. He attended Middlesex School in Concord, Massachusetts, and earned a Bachelor of Arts in American studies from Yale University.

== Career ==
Rachlis entered journalism as a pop music critic, reviewing albums for Rolling Stone that included 1970s works by Bob Dylan, Blondie, The Cars, Tom Waits, and Elvis Costello. From 1982 to 1984, Rachlis was arts editor of the alternative weekly Boston Phoenix, then went on to serve as executive editor of The Village Voice until 1988.

In 1988, Rachlis moved across the country to become editor-in-chief of LA Weekly. He was credited with professionalizing the paper and boosting its political and cultural coverage. Former columnist Marc Cooper would later write that under Rachlis the Weekly became "more slick, professional, better-edited but flatter, less willing to gamble and risk." In 1993, Rachlis was fired due to a conflict with publisher Michael Sigman. Several employees then resigned from the magazine, including Michael Ventura, John Powers, Rubén Martínez, and Ella Taylor, as well as Carson and Erickson.

Rachlis joined the L.A. Times in 1994, first as a senior editor at the paper's Sunday magazine, then as a senior projects editor.

In 2000, Rachlis joined Emmis Communications, which had just bought Los Angeles magazine for more than $30 million and was seeking an editor-in-chief to head the publication. The 2008 financial crisis took a heavy toll on Los Angeles magazine. On May 15, 2009, citing his "restlessness" in an e-mail to the staff, he announced his resignation, effective June 26. Emmis, which named Mary Melton as his successor, praised Rachlis for "elevating Los Angeles magazine to must-read status."

In 2011, Rachlis left Los Angeles to become editor of The American Prospect, the Washington, D.C.–based monthly political journal founded by Robert Kuttner, Robert Reich, and Paul Starr.

Rachlis returned to Los Angeles in 2014 to become a senior editor at The California Sunday Magazine. In September 2020, the magazine's owner, Emerson Collective, severed ties with California Sunday's parent company, Pop-Up Magazine Productions. A month later, Pop-Up's founders announced that the magazine would cease publication.

In 2021, Rachlis joined the staff of ProPublica as a senior editor.

== Personal life ==
Rachlis lives in Los Angeles. He is married to the psychotherapist Amy Albert. He is divorced from the writer and critic Ariel Swartley, with whom he has one daughter.
