= Elliot Easton =

American guitarist (born 1953)

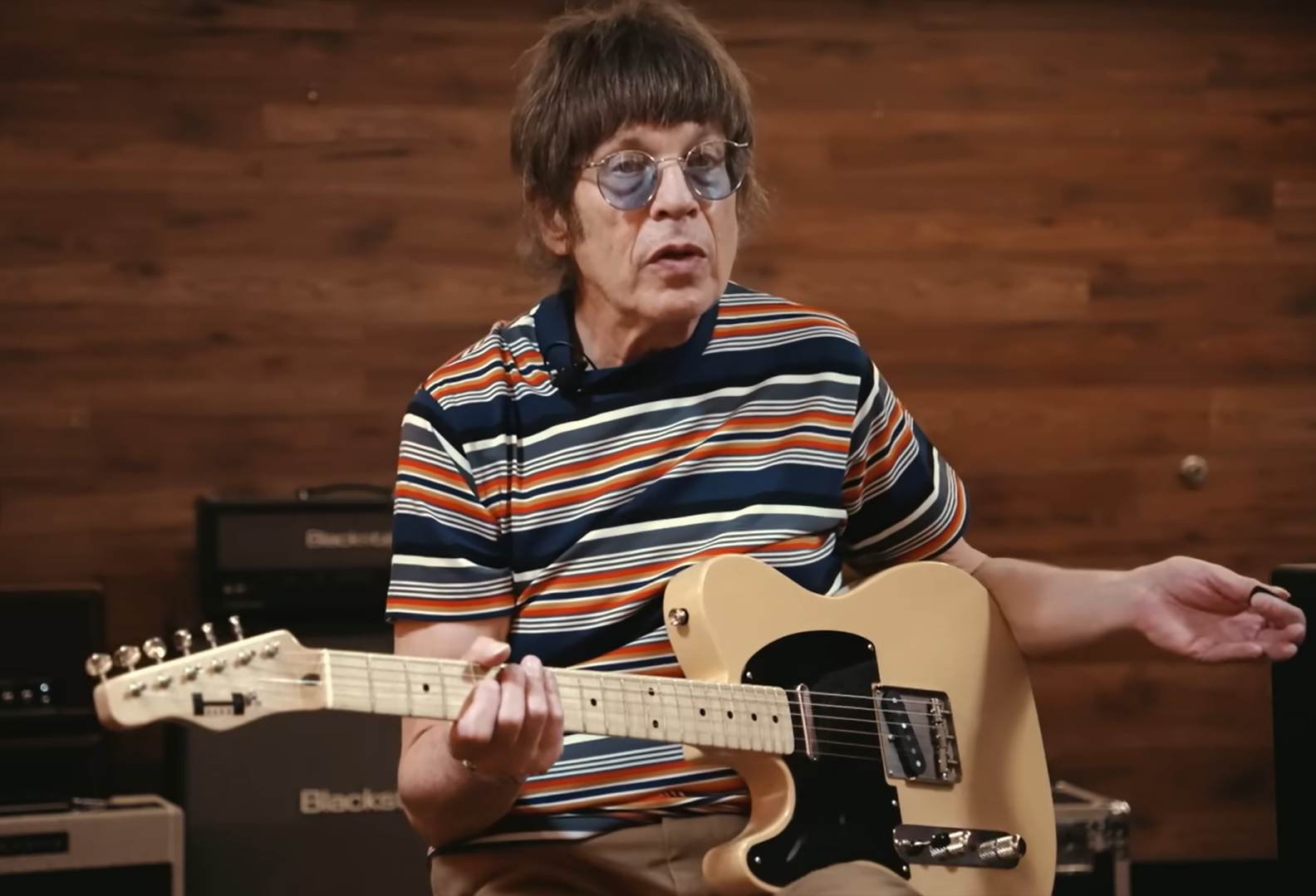
- Easton in 2022

Background information
- Born: Elliot Steinberg; December 18, 1953 (age 72); Brooklyn, New York, U.S.
- Genres: Rock; new wave; blues rock; hard rock; rockabilly
- Occupation: Guitarist
- Years active: 1975–present
- Member of: The Empty Hearts
- Formerly of: Cap'n Swing; The Cars; The New Cars

Elliot Easton (né Steinberg; born December 18, 1953) is an American musician who is best known as the lead guitarist and backing vocalist for the American new wave band the Cars. His melodic guitar solos are an integral part of the band's music. Easton has also recorded music as a solo artist, and has played in other bands. He is a left-handed guitarist. In 2018, Easton was inducted into the Rock and Roll Hall of Fame as a member of the Cars.

== Personal life ==
Born Elliott Steinberg on December 18, 1953 in Brooklyn, New York, Easton attended Massapequa High School in Massapequa, New York, and studied music at the Berklee College of Music. Easton has been married twice. As of 2018, he is married to Jill Easton. He has a daughter, Sydney, from his first marriage. He lives in Bell Canyon, California.

== Career ==
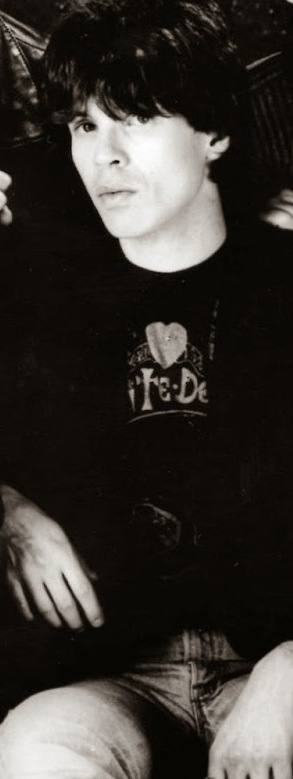
Easton in 1984

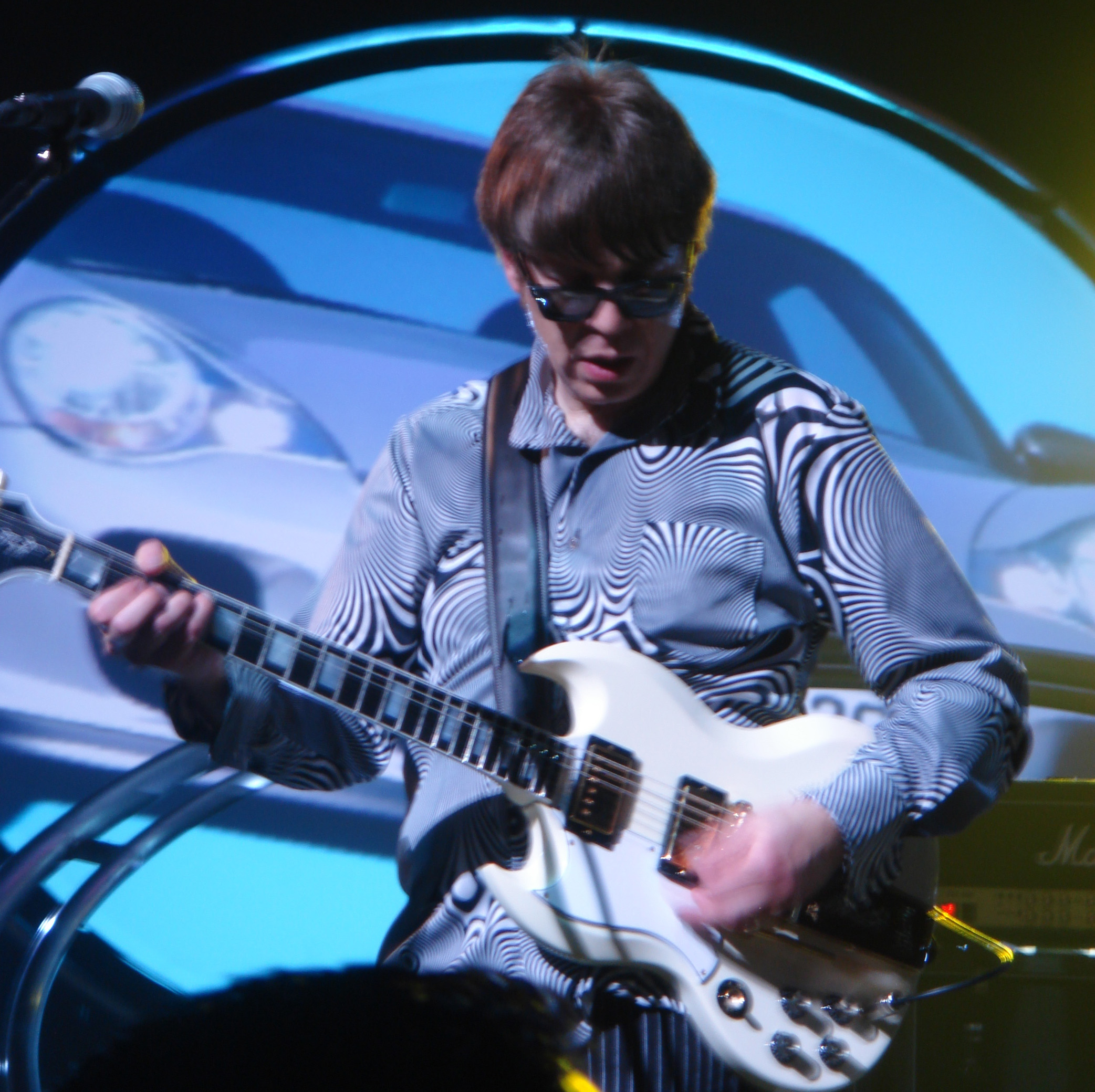
Easton performing with the New Cars at Nokia Live in Grand Prairie, Texas, 2006

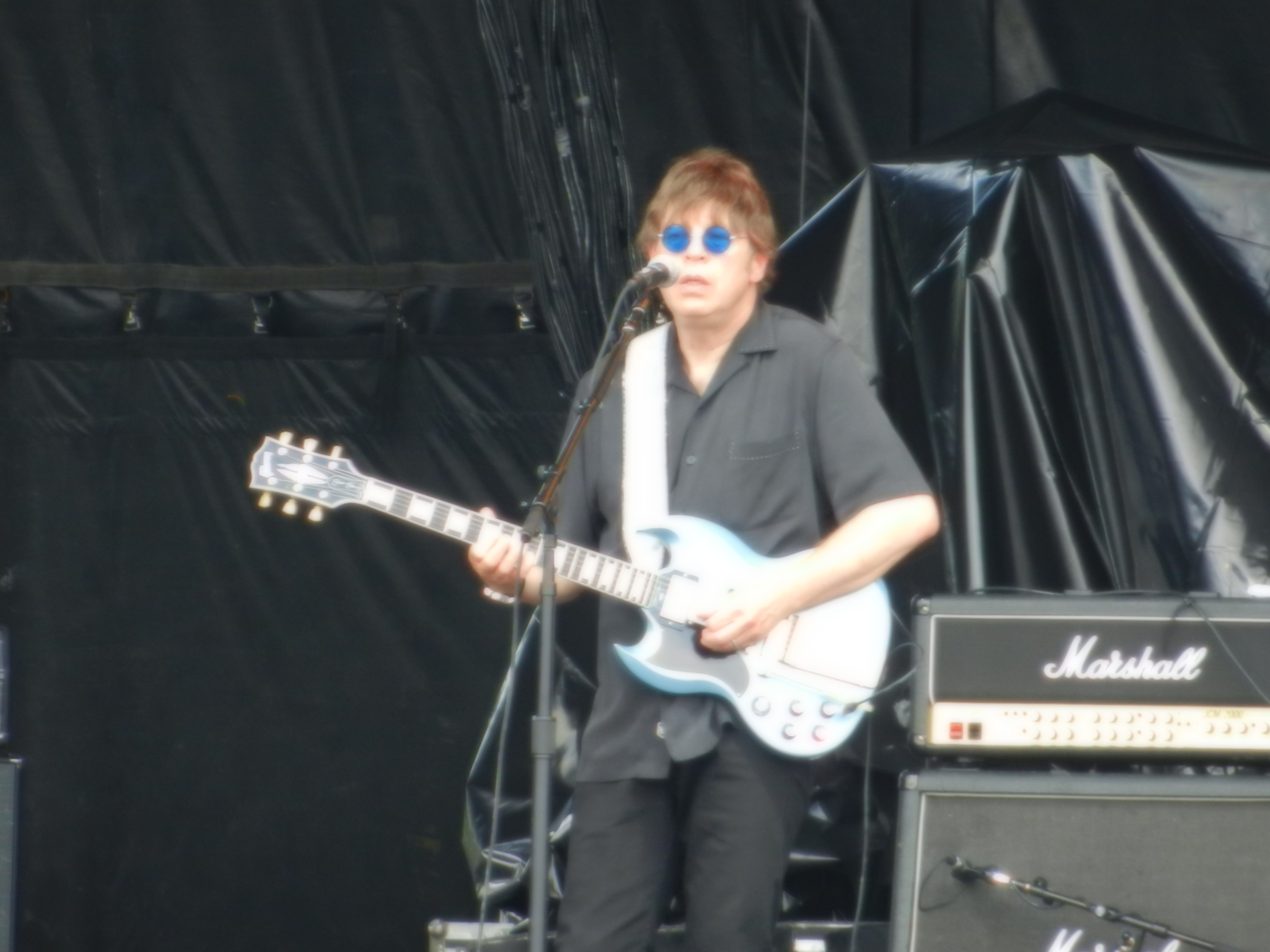
Easton performing with the Cars at Lollapalooza in Chicago, 2011

Easton is a founding member of the Cars and was their lead guitarist. The band was formed in 1976. Their debut studio album, The Cars (1978), contained the hit single "Just What I Needed". The band went on to release five more studio albums over the next nine years before breaking up in 1988. Easton was the youngest member of the band. Easton released one solo studio album, Change No Change (1985), featuring songs co-written with Jules Shear. One single, "(Wearing Down) Like a Wheel", was released and became a moderate hit on the rock charts.

In the mid-1990s, Easton produced and played on the first two studio albums by singer-songwriter Amy Rigby: Diary of a Mod Housewife (1996) and Middlescence (1998). He was also the lead guitarist on Jules Shear's solo studio album Healing Bones (1994). Easton was a founding member of Creedence Clearwater Revisited, a spinoff band consisting of Stu Cook and Doug Clifford of Creedence Clearwater Revival. He was in the Clearwater Revisited band from 1995 to 2004.

Easton was a member of the New Cars, along with original Cars' keyboardist Greg Hawkes, singer and songwriter Todd Rundgren, former Utopia bassist and vocalist Kasim Sulton, and Tubes drummer Prairie Prince. In June 2006, the band released a live album, It's Alive!, that includes three new studio tracks. Easton was featured and played the solo in the Click Five song "Angel to You (Devil to Me)".

In 2010, Easton reunited with the surviving original members of the Cars to record their first studio album in 24 years, entitled Move Like This. The album was released in May 2011, and the band toured in support of it. In 2014 Easton became a founding member of the supergroup the Empty Hearts. The band also included the Chesterfield Kings' bassist Andy Babiuk, Blondie's drummer Clem Burke, the Romantics' guitarist and vocalist Wally Palmar, and Faces' pianist Ian McLagan.

== Legacy ==
Guitarist Slash, of Guns N' Roses and Velvet Revolver, has cited Easton as one of his key musical influences, praising Easton's concise and melodic solos. In 2013, the Gibson guitar company launched the Elliot Easton "Tikibird" Firebird guitar, which is a modified version of their Firebird model. In 2018, Easton was inducted into the Rock and Roll Hall of Fame as a member of the Cars.

== Discography ==
=== Solo ===
- Album – Change No Change (1985) – U.S. No. 99
- Single – "(Wearing Down) Like a Wheel" (1985)
- Single – "Shayla" (1985)
- Single – "Tools of Your Labor" (1985)
- Single – "Monte Carlo Nights" (with Elliot Easton's Tiki Gods) (1995)

=== With Benjamin Orr ===
- The Lace (1986)

=== With Elliot Easton's Tiki Gods ===
- Easton Island (2013)
