= List of songs recorded by the Cars =

Songs recorded by the Cars

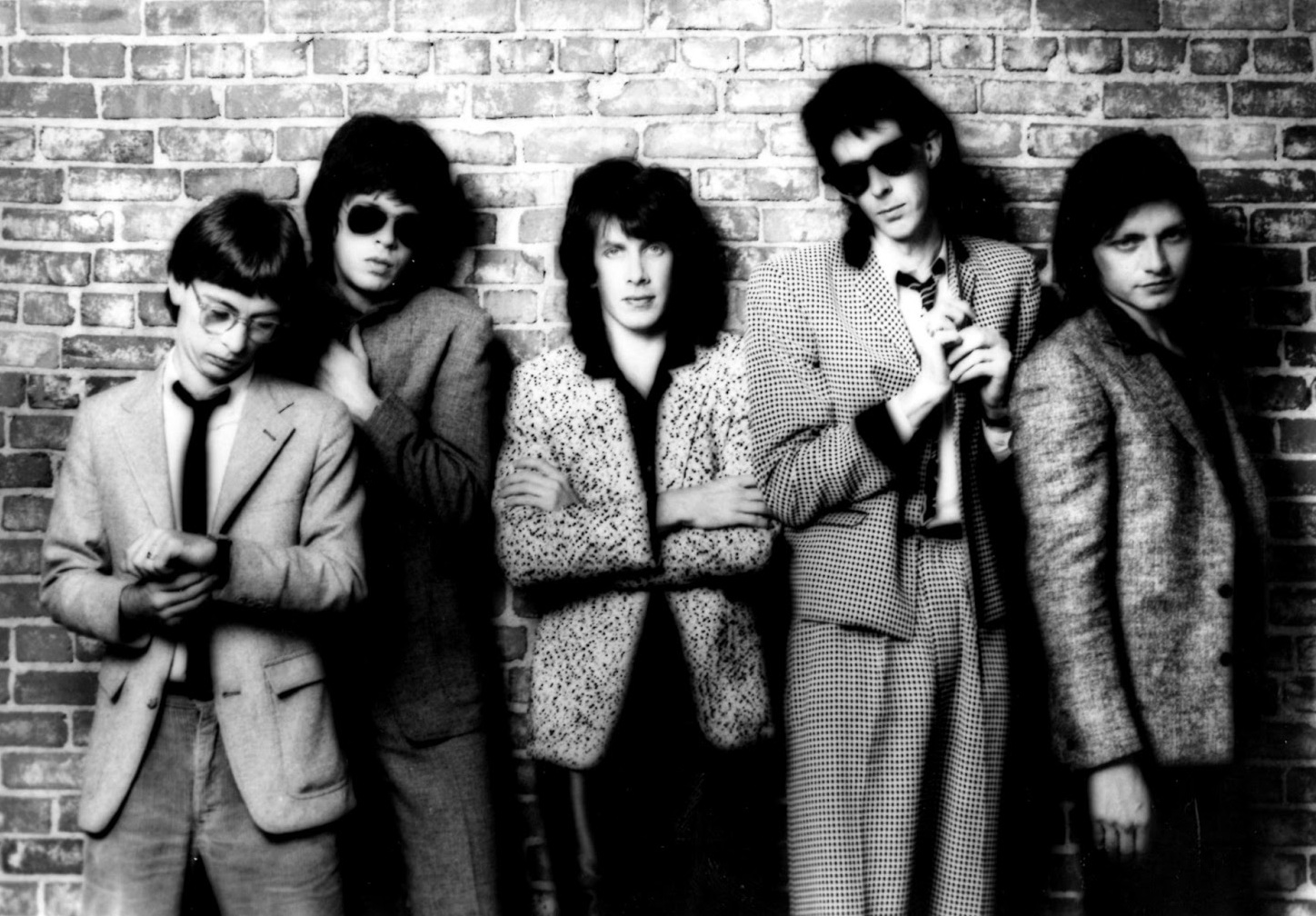
The Cars c. 1980 (L–R): Greg Hawkes, Elliot Easton, David Robinson, Ric Ocasek & Benjamin Orr

The Cars were an American rock band who recorded 89 songs during their career, of which included 86 originals and 3 covers. Emerging from the new wave scene in the late 1970s, the group consisted of singer, rhythm guitarist, and songwriter Ric Ocasek, bassist and singer Benjamin Orr, lead guitarist Elliot Easton, keyboardist Greg Hawkes, and drummer David Robinson.

== Songs ==
Key
†	Indicates cover version

Name of song, writer(s), original release, and year of release
Song	Writer(s)	Original release	Lead vocal(s)	Year	Ref.
"All Mixed Up"	Ric Ocasek	The Cars	Benjamin Orr	1978	
"Blue Tip"	Ric Ocasek	Move Like This	Ric Ocasek	2011	
"Breakaway"	Ric Ocasek	B-side of "Why Can't I Have You"	Ric Ocasek	1984	
"Bye Bye Love"	Ric Ocasek	The Cars	Benjamin Orr	1978	
"Candy-O"	Ric Ocasek	Candy-O	Benjamin Orr	1979	
"Coming Up You"	Ric Ocasek	Door to Door	Benjamin Orr	1987	
"Cool Fool"	Ric Ocasek; Elliot Easton	Just What I Needed: The Cars Anthology	Benjamin Orr	1995	
"Cruiser"	Ric Ocasek	Shake It Up	Benjamin Orr	1981	
"Dangerous Type"	Ric Ocasek	Candy-O	Ric Ocasek	1979	
"Door to Door"	Ric Ocasek	Door to Door	Ric Ocasek	1987	
"Don't Cha Stop"	Ric Ocasek	The Cars	Ric Ocasek	1978	
"Don't Go to Pieces"	Ric Ocasek; Greg Hawkes	B-side of "Don't Tell Me No" and "Gimme Some Slack"	Benjamin Orr	1980	
"Don't Tell Me No"	Ric Ocasek	Panorama	Benjamin Orr	1980	
"Double Life"	Ric Ocasek	Candy-O	Ric Ocasek	1979	
"Double Trouble"	Ric Ocasek	Door to Door	Benjamin Orr	1987	
"Down Boys"	Ric Ocasek	Panorama	Benjamin Orr	1980	
"Drag On Forever"	Ric Ocasek	Move Like This	Ric Ocasek	2011	
"A Dream Away" (Note: An early version, titled "Take It On the Run", was released on the 2018 reissue of Shake It Up.)	Ric Ocasek	Shake It Up	Ric Ocasek	1981	
"Drive"	Ric Ocasek	Heartbeat City	Benjamin Orr	1984	
"The Edge"	Ric Ocasek	Panorama (2017 reissue)	Benjamin Orr	2017	
"Everything You Say"	Ric Ocasek	Door to Door	Benjamin Orr	1987	
"Fine Line"	Ric Ocasek	Door to Door	Ric Ocasek	1987	
"Free"	Ric Ocasek	Move Like This	Ric Ocasek	2011	
"Funtime" (Iggy Pop cover)	David Bowie; Iggy Pop †	Just What I Needed: The Cars Anthology	Benjamin Orr	1995	
"Getting Through"	Ric Ocasek	Panorama	Ric Ocasek	1980	
"Gimme Some Slack"	Ric Ocasek	Panorama	Ric Ocasek	1980	
"Go Away"	Ric Ocasek; Greg Hawkes	Door to Door	Benjamin Orr	1987	
"Good Times Roll"	Ric Ocasek	The Cars	Ric Ocasek	1978	
"Got a Lot On My Head"	Ric Ocasek	Candy-O	Ric Ocasek	1979	
"Heartbeat City" (Note: An early version, titled "Jacki", appears on the 2018 reissue of Heartbeat City.)	Ric Ocasek	Heartbeat City	Ric Ocasek	1984	
"Hello Again"	Ric Ocasek	Heartbeat City	Ric Ocasek	1984	
"Hits Me"	Ric Ocasek	Move Like This	Ric Ocasek	2011	
"Hotel Queenie" (demo)	Ric Ocasek	The Cars (1999 reissue)	Ric Ocasek	1999	
"I Refuse" (Note: An early version, titled "Baby I Refuse", appears on the 2018 reissue of Heartbeat City.)	Ric Ocasek	Heartbeat City	Ric Ocasek	1984	
"It's All I Can Do"	Ric Ocasek	Candy-O	Benjamin Orr	1979	
"It's Not the Night"	Ric Ocasek; Greg Hawkes	Heartbeat City	Benjamin Orr; Ric Ocasek	1984	
"It's Only"	Ric Ocasek	Move Like This	Ric Ocasek	2011	
"I'm in Touch with Your World"	Ric Ocasek	The Cars	Ric Ocasek	1978	
"I'm Not the One" (Note: A remix appears on their Greatest Hits album.)	Ric Ocasek	Shake It Up	Ric Ocasek	1981	
"Just What I Needed"	Ric Ocasek	The Cars	Benjamin Orr	1978	
"Keep On Knocking"	Ric Ocasek	Move Like This	Ric Ocasek	2011	
"Leave or Stay" (Note: An early demo appears on Just What I Needed: The Cars Anthology (1995).)	Ric Ocasek	Door to Door	Ric Ocasek	1987	
"Let's Go"	Ric Ocasek	Candy-O	Benjamin Orr	1979	
"The Little Black Egg" (The Nightcrawlers cover)	Chuck Conlon †	Just What I Needed: The Cars Anthology	Ric Ocasek	1995	
"Looking for Love"	Ric Ocasek	Heartbeat City	Ric Ocasek	1984	
"Lust for Kicks"	Ric Ocasek	Candy-O	Ric Ocasek	1979	
"Magic"	Ric Ocasek	Heartbeat City	Ric Ocasek	1984	
"Maybe Baby" (Note: An early version, titled "Be My Baby", appears on the 2017 reissue of Panorama)	Ric Ocasek	Shake It Up	Ric Ocasek	1981	
"Midnight Dancer"	Ric Ocasek	Shake It Up (2018 reissue)	Benjamin Orr	2018	
"Misfit Kid"	Ric Ocasek	Panorama	Ric Ocasek	1980	
"Moving in Stereo"	Ric Ocasek; Greg Hawkes	The Cars	Benjamin Orr	1978	
"My Best Friend's Girl"	Ric Ocasek	The Cars	Ric Ocasek	1978	
"Night Spots"	Ric Ocasek	Candy-O	Ric Ocasek	1979	
"One by One" (demo)	Ric Ocasek	Move Like This (Enhanced edition)	Ric Ocasek	2011	
"Panorama"	Ric Ocasek	Panorama	Ric Ocasek	1980	
"Rocket USA" (demo) (Suicide cover)	Alan Vega; Martin Rev †	Move Like This (Enhanced edition)	Ric Ocasek	2011	
"Running to You"	Ric Ocasek	Panorama	Benjamin Orr	1980	
"Sad Song"	Ric Ocasek	Move Like This	Ric Ocasek	2011	
"Shake It Up"	Ric Ocasek	Shake It Up	Ric Ocasek	1981	
"Shoo Be Doo"	Ric Ocasek	Candy-O	Ric Ocasek	1979	
"Shooting For You"	Ric Ocasek	Panorama (2017 reissue)	Benjamin Orr	2017	
"Since I Held You"	Ric Ocasek	Candy-O	Ric Ocasek; Benjamin Orr	1979	
"Since You're Gone"	Ric Ocasek	Shake It Up	Ric Ocasek	1981	
"Slipaway"	Ric Ocasek	Just What I Needed: The Cars Anthology	Ric Ocasek	1995	
"Soon"	Ric Ocasek	Move Like This	Ric Ocasek	2011	
"Stranger Eyes"	Ric Ocasek	Heartbeat City	Benjamin Orr	1984	
"Strap Me In"	Ric Ocasek	Door to Door	Ric Ocasek	1987	
"Ta Ta Wayo Wayo"	Ric Ocasek	Door to Door	Ric Ocasek	1987	
"Take Another Look"	Ric Ocasek	Move Like This	Ric Ocasek	2011	
"Take Me Now"	Ric Ocasek	Just What I Needed: The Cars Anthology	Benjamin Orr	1995	
"Take What You Want" (demo)	Ric Ocasek	The Cars (1999 reissue)	Ric Ocasek	1999	
"That's It"	Ric Ocasek	B-side of "Let's Go"	Benjamin Orr	1979	
"They Won't See You" (demo)	Ric Ocasek	The Cars (1999 reissue)	Ric Ocasek	1999	
"Think It Over"	Ric Ocasek	Shake It Up	Benjamin Orr	1981	
"This Could Be Love"	Ric Ocasek; Greg Hawkes	Shake It Up	Benjamin Orr	1981	
"Tonight She Comes"	Ric Ocasek	Greatest Hits	Ric Ocasek	1985	
"Too Late"	Ric Ocasek	Move Like This	Ric Ocasek	2011	
"Touch and Go"	Ric Ocasek	Panorama	Ric Ocasek	1980	
"Up and Down"	Ric Ocasek	Panorama	Ric Ocasek	1980	
"Victim of Love"	Ric Ocasek	Shake It Up	Ric Ocasek	1981	
"Wake Me Up" (demo)	Ric Ocasek	The Cars (1999 reissue)	Benjamin Orr	1999	
"Why Can't I Have You" (Note: An early version, titled "One More Time", appears on the 2018 reissue of Heartbeat City.)	Ric Ocasek	Heartbeat City	Ric Ocasek	1984	
"Wound Up on You"	Ric Ocasek	Door to Door	Ric Ocasek	1987	
"You Are the Girl"	Ric Ocasek	Door to Door	Ric Ocasek; Benjamin Orr	1987	
"You Can't Hold On Too Long"	Ric Ocasek	Candy-O	Benjamin Orr	1979	
"You Just Can't Push Me" (demo)	Ric Ocasek	The Cars (1999 reissue)	Benjamin Orr	1999	
"You Might Think"	Ric Ocasek	Heartbeat City	Ric Ocasek	1984	
"You Wear Those Eyes"	Ric Ocasek	Panorama	Benjamin Orr; Ric Ocasek	1980	
"You're All I've Got Tonight"	Ric Ocasek	The Cars	Ric Ocasek	1978	
