= Stay the Night (Benjamin Orr song) =

Single by Benjamin Orr

from the album The Lace
- B-side: "That's the Way"
- Released: September 1986
- Length: 4:26
- Label: Elektra 69506
- Songwriters: Benjamin Orr; Diane Grey Page
- Producers: Mike Shipley; Ben Orr; Larry Klein

Benjamin Orr singles chronology
"Stay the Night" (1986)	"Too Hot to Stop" (1987)

Music video
- "Stay the Night" on YouTube

"Stay the Night" is the debut solo single by the Cars co-lead vocalist and bassist Benjamin Orr, released in late 1986 from his debut solo album The Lace. The song reached No. 24 on the Billboard Hot 100 chart, as well as #2 Adult Contemporary, in early 1987, becoming Orr's only top 40 hit as a solo artist.

== Background ==
Prior to recording his solo album, Orr had been a founding member, along with singer and songwriter Ric Ocasek, of the Cars. The Cars' first top 40 hit, "Just What I Needed", featured Orr on lead vocals, as did their biggest hit, "Drive", from 1984's Heartbeat City.

Following the Cars' 1985 Greatest Hits release, the band split up to pursue solo projects, with both Orr and Ocasek releasing solo albums in 1986, lead guitarist Elliot Easton having released one in 1985. Weeks before "Stay the Night" entered the US top 40, Ocasek himself was in the top 40 with his own solo hit "Emotion in Motion". These would become the only US top 40 solo hits for both Cars members

The band reunited to record 1987's Door to Door, which produced "You Are the Girl", their last top 40 single.

== Track listing ==
US 7" (Elektra)

1. "Stay the Night" – 4:26
2. "That's the Way" – 4:07

== Chart performance ==
Chart performance for "Stay the Night"
Chart (1986–1987)	Peak position
Australia (Kent Music Report)	66
US Billboard Hot 100	24
US Adult Contemporary (Billboard)	2
US Album Rock Tracks (Billboard)	6
