= You Might Think =

1984 single by the Cars

- US picture sleeve

Single by the Cars

from the album Heartbeat City
- B-side: "Heartbeat City"; "Let's Go"; "I Refuse"
- Released: February 1984
- Recorded: 1983–1984
- Studio: Battery, London
- Genre: Rock; new wave; pop rock; synth-rock
- Length: 3:04
- Label: Elektra
- Songwriter: Ric Ocasek
- Producers: Robert John "Mutt" Lange; the Cars

The Cars singles chronology
"Think It Over" (1982)	"You Might Think" (1984)	"Magic" (1984)

Music video
- "You Might Think" on YouTube

"You Might Think" is a song by American rock band the Cars from their fifth studio album, Heartbeat City (1984). The track was written by Ric Ocasek and produced by Mutt Lange and the Cars, with Ocasek also providing the lead vocals.

The song was released in February 1984, as the first single from Heartbeat City. "You Might Think" peaked at number seven in the United States and number eight in Canada. It also reached number one on the Mainstream Rock Tracks chart in the US, the band's first song to do so. In the United Kingdom, the song reached number 88.

== Music video ==
The song's music video features early computer graphics.

The music video is one of the first to use computer graphics. The video features Ocasek and model Susan Gallagher in a series of quirky encounters. Ocasek appears in her bathroom mirror, inside a large periscope that pops up in her bathtub, in her mouth, as a fly, as King Kong on top of the Empire State Building and as the Robot Monster, among other incarnations. The rest of the band appears together and separately throughout the video; after they all appear in the movie-theater scene, keyboardist Greg Hawkes plays the dentist in the scene in which Ocasek is jackhammering a tooth in the girl's mouth. In the King Kong scene, the other three members, guitarist Elliot Easton, bassist Benjamin Orr and drummer David Robinson, are paired off in the two planes flying around Ocasek. One scene, set in a movie theater, features the 1953 film Robot Monster, with Ocasek transforming into the monster.

An alternate video omits the ending where Ric Ocasek "removes" his face, a gush of water with various artifacts from the video streams out from where his face was, and the fly version of Ocasek flies into the screen and spatters green fly guts into the words "The End". Instead, in the alternate version, his face remains in place and he continues to lip-synch to the lyrics.

"You Might Think" won the first MTV Video Music Award for Video of the Year and was nominated for five more awards (Best Special Effects, Best Art Direction, Viewer's Choice, Best Concept Video and Most Experimental Video) at the 1984 MTV Video Music Awards. The video also won five awards (Best Video, Best Conceptual, Most Innovative, Best Editing and Best Special Effects) at Billboard's 1984 Video Music Awards and four awards (Best Achievement In Music Video, Best Editing In Music Video, Best Engineering In Music Video and Best Camerawork In Music Video) at the Videotape Production Association's 1985 Monitor Awards.

Robin Sloane of Elektra Records creative directed the video after director Jeff Stein (of the Who's The Kids Are Alright) showed her samples from New-York-based visual-effects company Charlex. The firm was nationally known for the innovative weekly advertisements that it was producing the National Enquirer. The commercials featured the first use of the Quantel Paintbox, the first tool for artists to use directly on the video screen. Stein, along with Charlex founders Alex Weil and Charlie Levi, directed and produced the video. Danny Rosenberg and Bill Weber served both as editors and video engineers, Kevin Jones was the lighting director, Danny Ducovny the cinematographer and Bob Ryzner the art director. The video cost $80,000 to produce, which was almost triple the average music-video budget of the time.

== Track listings ==
- 7-inch single

A. "You Might Think" – 3:04
B. "Heartbeat City" – 4:30

- 12-inch single

A. "You Might Think" – 3:04
B1. "Let's Go" – 3:33
B2. "I Refuse" – 3:16

== Credits and personnel ==
- Ric Ocasek – lead vocals, rhythm guitar
- Ben Orr – backing vocals, bass guitar
- Elliot Easton – lead guitar, backing vocals
- Greg Hawkes – keyboards, backing vocals, Fairlight CMI
- David Robinson – drums
- Mutt Lange – backing vocals

== Charts ==
=== Weekly charts ===
1984 weekly chart performance for "You Might Think"
Chart (1984)	Peak position
Australia (Kent Music Report)	24
Canada Top Singles (RPM)	8
Netherlands (Single Top 100)	49
Netherlands (Tipparade)	11
New Zealand (Recorded Music NZ)	27
Sweden (Sverigetopplistan)	20
UK Singles (Official Charts)	88
US Billboard Hot 100	7
US Dance Club Songs (Billboard)	14
US Mainstream Rock (Billboard)	1
US Cash Box Top 100 Singles	7

2019 weekly chart performance for "You Might Think"
Chart (2019)	Peak position
US Rock Digital Song Sales (Billboard)	16

=== Year-end charts ===
Year-end chart performance for "You Might Think"
Chart (1984)	Position
Canada Top Singles (RPM)	61
US Billboard Hot 100	65
US Cash Box Top 100 Singles	64

== Certifications ==
Region	Certification	Certified units/sales
New Zealand (RMNZ)	Gold	15,000^{‡}
^{‡} Sales+streaming figures based on certification alone.

== Weezer version ==
"You Might Think"
- Lyric sheet

Song by Weezer

from the album Cars 2 (Original Motion Picture Soundtrack)
- Released: June 14, 2011
- Genre: Pop rock
- Length: 3:07
- Label: Walt Disney
- Songwriter: Ric Ocasek
- Producers: Weezer; Shawn Everett

Music video
- "You Might Think" on YouTube

In 2011, American rock band Weezer covered the song for the soundtrack of the animated film Cars 2. Weezer had a relationship with Cars co-vocalist Ocasek (who wrote and sang lead vocals on the original song), as Ocasek produced three of the band's albums, including 1994's Weezer (Blue Album), 2001's Weezer (Green Album), and later 2014's Everything Will Be Alright in the End. On June 14, Weezer announced the cover on Kerrang!, Weezer guitarist Brian Bell announced "The song is going to play in the scene where Lightning McQueen and Mater go to Japan, which is great for us because it sort of mirrors our experiences in Japan – there was a little bit of culture shock!". The cover was released as the opening track on the same day and a music video was released to the band's Vevo channel on June 21, three days before the film, featuring the band recording the song, scenes from the film, people working on the film, and the band in Japan, and was directed by Tim Wilkerson. This version was co-produced by the band and Shawn Everett. Weezer bassist Scott Shriner performed the song with the Cars at their Rock and Roll Hall of Fame induction in 2018, which was Ocasek's final performance until his death the following year. Weezer's version charted at number 8 on the Mexico Ingles Airplay.
