= CHRLX =

American animation studio

Charlex, Inc.
- Trade name: CHRLX
- Type: Private
- Industry: Commercials, films, animation, branding
- Founded: 1979
- Founder: Alex Weil; Charlie Levi
- Headquarters: New York City, New York, U.S.
- Key people: Christopher Byrnes (President)
- Number of employees: 28
- Website: www.chrlx.com

CHRLX (formerly known as Charlex until 2014) is an American animation studio based in New York City that produces animation primarily for commercials.

== History ==
Charlie Levi and Alex Weil founded Charlex (with the name being a portmanteau of their first names) in 1979 "with $1,600 and a phone" to support their rock band and to work on commercials. When the band folded, Levi and Weil began working at Charlex full-time. In 1981, Charlex began producing an innovative weekly TV-ad campaign for the National Enquirer, and in 1984, they created The Cars' "You Might Think" music video, for which they were awarded the "Video of the Year" –the very first winner– at the 1984 MTV Video Music Awards. Both projects helped Charlex get more work throughout the 1980s, including network IDs for the Fred/Alan agency, commercials, and opening titles for various programs. In 1986, Charlex produced a Cherry Coke advertisement that featured multiple composited layers of digital video.

In 1998, Charlex started using CHRLX as an alternative name for the company (removing the vowels from their name); the Charlex name was slowly phased out until 2014, although it is still CHRLX's legal name. In 2006, Charlex's short film One Rat Short received a Best of Show award at the SIGGRAPH 2006 Computer Animation Festival. CHRLX's co-founder Alex Weil died in 2019, but CHRLX continues to operate under the leadership of Chris Byrnes.

== Filmography ==
=== Short films ===
- Inner Tube (backgrounds and electronic effects; 1987)
- One Rat Short (2006)
- Amarelinha (associate producer; 2007)
- ShapeShifter (2010)

=== Music videos ===
- The Cars – "You Might Think" (1984)
- The Cars – "Heartbreak City" (transitional links; 1984)
- Yes – 9012Live (1985)

=== Television/film ===
- Saturday Night Live (opening titles; 1984)
- Mr. Wizard's World (opening titles; 1985)
- National Geographic Explorer (opening titles; 1990)
- The Howard Stern Show (show opening; 1990)
- The Honeymooners Anniversary Special (video restoration; 1990)
- Real Mature (opening sequence; 1991)
- TNT 100% Weird (opening sequence; 1992)
- Nickelodeon Home Video (opening titles; 1993)
- David Blaine: Magic Man (opening graphics; 1998)
- On the Run (credit sequence design; 1999)
- David Blaine: Frozen in Time (opening graphics; 2000)
- Capturing the Friedmans (visual effects; 2003)
- Maniac ("Windmills" animation; 2018)

=== Commercials ===
- American Express
- American International Group
- AOL
- AT&T
- Avis
- Bass Weejuns
- Bausch & Lomb
- Blue Bonnet Butter Blend
- British Airways
- Bubble Yum
- Budweiser
- Campbell's
- Capella University
- Centrum
- Charles Schwab Corporation
- Cinemax
- Cingular
- Clairol
- Coca-Cola
- Crest
- Dannon
- David Yurman
- Diet Pepsi
- DirecTV
- Dodge
- Dole Food Company
- Dr. Scholl's
- Dunkin' Donuts
- E-Trade
- Fidelity Investments
- Fila
- Ford Motor Company
- General Electric
- General Mills
- Georgia Lottery
- Gillette
- Grey Goose
- HA! TV Comedy Network
- Häagen-Dazs
- Hanna-Barbera
- Hannaford
- Hasbro
- HealthCare.gov
- Healthy Choice
- The Hershey Company
- Holiday Inn
- Honeycomb
- HTC
- IBM
- Jarritos
- JCPenney
- Jell-O
- JEM
- Ken's Foods
- Kodak
- Kohl's
- Kotex
- Krylon
- Lifetime
- Lucent
- M&M's
- Maryland Lottery
- Maxell
- Milk-Bone
- The Movie Channel
- MSNBC
- Myers Rum Video Network
- National Enquirer
- Nexium
- Nextel Communications
- NFL
- Nickelodeon/Nick at Nite
- Nickelodeon Studios
- Nike, Inc.
- North Texas Municipal Water District
- Ocean Spray
- Pizza Hut
- Polaroid
- Procter & Gamble
- Ralph Lauren Corporation
- Revlon
- Ribena
- Rite Aid
- The Ritz-Carlton Hotel Company
- Seagram's Escapes
- Seton Healthcare Family
- Sprint Corporation
- Sony
- Sour Patch Kids
- Subway
- Toshiba REGZA
- True Value
- Valvoline
- Verizon Communications
- VH1
- Visa Inc.
- White Mountain Cooler
- WCVB-TV
- WTTG-TV
- Zale Corporation
- Ziploc

=== Idents ===
- Nickelodeon
- 1984's -
- 1990's -
