= Magic (The Cars song) =

Single by the Cars

from the album Heartbeat City
- B-side: "I Refuse"
- Released: May 7, 1984
- Studio: Battery (Willesden, London)
- Genre: Rock; new wave; power pop
- Length: 3:57
- Label: Elektra
- Songwriter: Ric Ocasek
- Producers: Mutt Lange; The Cars

The Cars singles chronology
"You Might Think" (1984)	"Magic" (1984)	"Drive" (1984)

Music video
- "Magic" on YouTube

"Magic" is a song by American rock band the Cars from their fifth studio album, Heartbeat City (1984). It was released on May 7, 1984, by Elektra Records, as the album's second single, reaching number 12 on the U.S. Billboard Hot 100 and number one on the Billboard Top Tracks chart. The track was written by Ric Ocasek and produced by Mutt Lange and the Cars. Ocasek sang lead vocals.

== Music video ==
The music video for "Magic" is set at a pool party attended by an array of bizarre and comically deranged characters. It features Ocasek walking on the water of the swimming pool as the various characters gather to marvel at him. Toward the end of the video, some of the guests (perhaps in their own delusion) attempt to reach Ocasek by stepping onto the pool's surface believing that they too can walk on water, but only end up plunging into the pool. Ocasek remains standing (and dry) because, as the song title suggests, "it's magic".

The Cars shot "Magic" at the Hilton family house in Beverly Hills, California, which Kathy Hilton had leased to the band. A plexiglass platform sat under the surface of the water. The platform collapsed on the first take and had to be adjusted to support Ocasek's weight.

== Personnel ==
The Cars

- Ric Ocasek – lead vocals, rhythm guitar
- Benjamin Orr – bass guitar, backing vocals
- Elliot Easton – lead guitar, backing vocals
- Greg Hawkes – keyboards, backing vocals, Fairlight CMI programming
- David Robinson – drums, Fairlight CMI programming

Additional personnel

- Andy Topeka – Fairlight CMI programming

== Charts ==
=== Weekly charts ===
1984 weekly chart performance for "Magic"
Chart (1984)	Peak position
Australia (Kent Music Report)	96
Canada Top Singles (RPM)	14
New Zealand (Recorded Music NZ)	50
US Billboard Hot 100	12
US Mainstream Rock Airplay (Billboard)	1
US Cash Box Top 100 Singles	16

2019 weekly chart performance for "Magic"
Chart (2019)	Peak position
US Rock Digital Song Sales (Billboard)	13

=== Year-end charts ===
Year-end chart performance for "Magic"
Chart (1984)	Position
US Billboard Hot 100	97

== In popular culture ==
In October 2026, the song was covered by Hailee Steinfeld for the soundtrack to the Walt Disney Animation Studios film Hexed (2026).
