= DMZ (disambiguation) =

DMZ is a demilitarized zone, a buffer zone between military powers. DMZs include:

- Korean DMZ
- Vietnamese DMZ (1954–1976)

DMZ may also refer to:

== Arts and media ==
- DMZ (comics), an American comic book series
- DMZ, a character in the Blood Syndicate comics universe
- DMZ (miniseries), a TV miniseries based on the comic book
- DMZ (band), a 1970s Boston punk band
  - DMZ (DMZ album), 1978
- D.M.Z. (Resurrection Band album), 1982
- A dubstep record label and clubnight, run by Digital Mystikz

== Science and technology ==
- DMZ (computing), a demilitarized zone in network computing
- DMZGlobal, a security division of Vodafone
- Dimethylzinc, a chemical

== Other uses ==
- DMZ, a game mode in Call of Duty: Modern Warfare II released in 2022, and in the 2026 release of Call of Duty: Modern Warfare 4
- DMZ International Documentary Film Festival, a South Korean film festival
- DMZ (Toronto Metropolitan University), business incubator (formerly Digital Media Zone)
