= The Cars North American Tour Spring 2011 =

2011 concert tour by the Cars

North American Tour Spring 2011
- Tour by The Cars
- Location: North America
- Associated album: Move Like This
- Start date: May 10, 2011
- End date: August 7, 2011
- No. of shows: 12

The Cars North American Tour Spring 2011 is a set of eleven concerts in the United States and Canada featuring the newly reunited American band The Cars. Announced in April 2011 prior to the release of the band's album Move Like This, the concerts feature material from Move Like This and from the band's 1970s and 1980s albums.

Singer/guitarist Ric Ocasek, keyboardist Greg Hawkes, guitarist Elliot Easton and drummer David Robinson performed as a quartet, as original Cars singer and bassist Benjamin Orr died in 2000. Orr's bass parts were performed by Hawkes on keyboard and bass, while the vocals on songs originally sung by Orr ("Just What I Needed", "Let's Go" and "Moving in Stereo") were performed by Ocasek. As Ocasek died on September 15, 2019, this is the final tour from the band.

== Tour dates ==
Date	City	Country	Venue
May 10, 2011	Seattle	United States	Showbox SoDo
May 12, 2011	Los Angeles	United States	Hollywood Palladium
May 13, 2011	Oakland	United States	Fox Theater
May 15, 2011	Denver	United States	Fillmore
May 17, 2011	Minneapolis	United States	First Avenue
May 18, 2011	Chicago	United States	Riviera Theatre
May 20, 2011	Toronto	Canada	Sound Academy
May 22, 2011	Philadelphia	United States	Electric Factory
May 23, 2011	Washington, D.C.	United States	9:30 Club
May 25, 2011	New York City	United States	Roseland Ballroom
May 26, 2011	Boston	United States	House of Blues
August 7, 2011	Chicago	United States	Lollapalooza

== Reception ==
The performances and set lists were met with mixed reviews: The Hollywood Reporter reviewer Erik Pedersen found Move Like This to be a "surprisingly good" album but described the Hollywood Palladium show as "icy" and unenthusiastic. San Jose Mercury News reviewer Jim Harrington described the band's performance at Oakland's Fox Theater as "incredibly flat and dispassionate", but praised the band's "solid" musicianship.

== Band members ==
- Ric Ocasek – lead vocals, guitar
- Elliot Easton – guitars, backing vocals
- Greg Hawkes – keyboards, bass, backing vocals
- David Robinson – drums, backing vocals
