= Heartbeat City (song) =

- UK picture sleeve

Single by the Cars

from the album Heartbeat City
- B-side: "Why Can't I Have You"
- Released: September 23, 1985
- Recorded: 1983–1984
- Studio: Battery (Willesden, London)
- Genre: New wave; synth-pop
- Length: 4:31
- Label: Elektra
- Songwriter: Ric Ocasek
- Producers: Robert John "Mutt" Lange; the Cars

The Cars singles chronology
"Why Can't I Have You" (1985)	"Heartbeat City" (1985)	"Tonight She Comes" (1985)

"Heartbeat City" is a song by American rock band the Cars from their fifth studio album of the same name (1984). It was released on September 23, 1985 as the album's sixth and final single.

== Background ==
Original US pressings of the LP and cassette versions listed the title of "Heartbeat City" as "Jacki".

"Heartbeat City" was one of the four songs performed by the Cars during their performance on Live Aid in 1985, along with "You Might Think", "Drive", and "Just What I Needed".

== Release ==
"Heartbeat City" was released internationally as the sixth and final single from the Heartbeat City album; the B-side was "Why Can't I Have You". The song charted at number 78 in the United Kingdom and number 75 in Australia. Prior to its single release, "Heartbeat City" appeared as the B-side of "You Might Think" in the United States and "Why Can't I Have You" in the United Kingdom.

== Reception ==
"Heartbeat City" has been described retrospectively as "ethereal" and as a "highlight" from Heartbeat City by AllMusic critic Greg Prato. Donald A. Guarisco, also of AllMusic, characterized the track as "a memorable effort in [the] vein [of 'atmospheric moodpieces'], a hypnotic bit of new wave that mixed impressionistic lyrics with an entrancing electronic soundscape." He concluded, "The result was probably a little too esoteric to be a hit but it got some exposure as the B-side to 'You Might Think' and provide[d] a fittingly arty finale for the Heartbeat City album."

== Charts ==
Chart performance for "Heartbeat City"
Chart (1985)	Peak position
Australia (Kent Music Report)	75
UK Singles (OCC)	78
