= Hello Again (The Cars song) =

Single by the Cars

from the album Heartbeat City
- Released: October 15, 1984
- Recorded: 1983–1984
- Studio: Battery (Willesden, London)
- Genre: Rock; new wave
- Length: 3:47
- Label: Elektra
- Songwriter: Ric Ocasek
- Producers: Mutt Lange; The Cars

The Cars singles chronology
"Drive" (1984)	"Hello Again" (1984)	"Why Can't I Have You" (1985)

Music video
- "Hello Again" on YouTube

"Hello Again" is a song by American rock band the Cars from their fifth studio album Heartbeat City (1984). It was released on October 15, 1984 as the album's fourth single. The song was the fourth top-20 entry from the album, reaching number 20 on the Billboard Hot 100 chart; it also reached number eight on the Hot Dance/Disco chart and number 22 on the Top Rock Tracks chart. Ric Ocasek sings lead vocals on the track.

== Critical reception ==
Billboard wrote that "Hello Again" goes "back to the staccato synth beat and wry mannered style that typified the group's singles before 'Drive' changed all that."

"Hello Again" was retrospectively described as "eccentric" by AllMusic critic Greg Prato, who also cited the track as a highlight from the Heartbeat City album. Donald Guarisco, also of AllMusic, wrote "One of their strongest tracks [on Heartbeat City with experimental roots] was 'Hello Again,' a stylish new wave rocker with plenty of experimental touches." Guarisco added that it "represents the Cars striking a unique balance between their gift for pop hooks and their love of experimental sounds."

In his review of the compilation album Greatest Hits (1985), Prato felt that "Hello Again" should have been included on the album, stating "why was the title track from Heartbeat City (an unsuccessful single) included instead of the 1984 Top 20 hit 'Hello Again'?"

== Music video ==
The music video for the song was directed by Andy Warhol and Don Munroe. Warhol appeared in the video as a bartender, which was filmed at the Be-Bop Cafe in Manhattan on March 29, 1984. Dianne Brill and John Sex of the downtown New York scene made cameos. A then-unknown Gina Gershon also appeared in the video. Keyboardist Greg Hawkes said "I think [Warhol] mainly did some of the conceptualizing and showed up to be an extra. And he invited his various friends to be in it. It was like any video shoot, but with a more interesting cast of characters. And you could always look over on the set and go 'Hey that's Andy Warhol.'"

The music video explored the controversial topics of sex and violence (mostly the former) that were being featured in music videos at the time.

It was played in medium rotation on MTV for a few months, before reaching heavy in October, and ended up spending at least 23 weeks on the playlist.

== Track listings ==
- 7-inch single

A. "Hello Again" – 3:45
B. "Hello Again" (Dub Version) – 5:02

- 12-inch single

A1. "Hello Again" (Remix Version / Vocal) – 5:54
A2. "Hello Again" (Dub Version) – 6:02
B. "Hello Again" (LP Version / Vocal) – 3:47

== Charts ==
Chart performance for "Hello Again"
Chart (1984–1985)	Peak position
Australia (Kent Music Report)	52
Austria (Ö3 Austria Top 40)	21
Belgium (Ultratop 50 Flanders)	22
Canada Top Singles (RPM)	42
Netherlands (Tipparade)	12
New Zealand (Recorded Music NZ)	12
Switzerland (Schweizer Hitparade)	17
US Billboard Hot 100	20
US Dance Club Songs (Billboard)	8
US Mainstream Rock (Billboard)	22
US Cash Box Top 100 Singles	19
West Germany (GfK)	27
