= Strap Me In =

Single by the Cars

from the album Door to Door
- B-side: "Door to Door"
- Released: October 19, 1987
- Recorded: 1987
- Genre: Hard rock; new wave
- Length: 4:22
- Label: Elektra
- Songwriter: Ric Ocasek
- Producer: Ric Ocasek

The Cars singles chronology
"You Are the Girl" (1987)	"Strap Me In" (1987)	"Coming Up You" (1988)

"Strap Me In" is a song by the Cars, appearing on their sixth studio album Door to Door (1987).

== Music video ==
Like its predecessor, "You Are the Girl", a music video was produced for "Strap Me In". The video featured the band playing in a barren wasteland as a couple fought. It was also the final video the Cars made before they broke up, with the next video being made for "Sad Song" in 2011.

== Release and reception ==
"Strap Me In" first saw release on the Door to Door album in August 1987, opening the second side of the album. In September 1987, "Strap Me In" also saw single release in America (as well in Japan, Germany, and Australia) as the follow-up to the top-twenty single "You Are the Girl". However, it was unable to match the chart success of its predecessor, only managing to reach #85 on the Billboard Hot 100, although it did reach #4 on the Billboard Mainstream Rock chart. A follow-up single, "Coming Up You" performed marginally better, hitting #74 in America.

Cash Box called it a "powerful pop/rock number led by Ric Ocasek's inimitable vocals."

"Strap Me In" was noted in the Just What I Needed: The Cars Anthology liner notes as the "standout track" from Door to Door, which also said, "'Strap Me In' proved that [Ric] Ocasek could still turn an automotive double-entendre with the best of them."

== Charts ==
Chart performance for "Strap Me In"
Chart (1987)	Peak position
US Billboard Hot 100	85
US Mainstream Rock (Billboard)	4
US Cash Box Top 100 Singles	84
