= Coming Up You =

Single by The Cars

Single by the Cars

from the album Door to Door
- B-side: "Double Trouble"
- Released: January 1988
- Recorded: 1987
- Studio: Electric Lady (New York City)
- Genre: New wave; pop
- Length: 4:18
- Label: Elektra
- Songwriter: Ric Ocasek
- Producer: Ric Ocasek

The Cars singles chronology
"Strap Me In" (1987)	"Coming Up You" (1988)	"Sad Song" (2011)

"Coming Up You" is a song by American rock band the Cars from their sixth studio album, Door to Door (1987). It was written by Ric Ocasek and sung by Benjamin Orr.

== Release ==
"Coming Up You" was released as a single in the United States and Australia, backed with the fellow Door to Door track "Double Trouble". The third and final single from Door to Door (after the top-20 entry "You Are the Girl" and its less successful follow-up "Strap Me In"), the song peaked at number 74 on the Billboard Hot 100 (a slight improvement from the performance of "Strap Me In") and number 37 on the Adult Contemporary chart. However, unlike its predecessors, it failed to chart at all on the Mainstream Rock chart. It is also among the very few songs by the group not to feature a promotional video.

The single was the final Cars single released before the band broke up in 1988 (although it was followed up by "Sad Song" when the band reunited in 2011).

== Critical reception ==
AllMusic critic Mike DeGagne called the track the "most melodious tune [on Door to Door]" and went on to say it "was easily one of the Cars most distinct efforts since it doesn't quite carry the same new wave/pop rock structure as the rest of their material yet relinquishes the same type of Cars charm." DeGagne continued, "'Coming Up You' is one of [the] bright spots in an otherwise faltering release as fans were still comparing Door to Door to the success of 1984's Heartbeat City album. After all of the tracks are heard on Door to Door, 'Coming Up You' easily rises above the rest of the album's lackluster fare, mainly because [Benjamin] Orr seems to sound more enthused and more interested than [Ric] Ocasek does on any of his songs."

Cash Box said that "Ocasek's patented simplicity works again in clean weave of rhythm, melody and harmony."

== Charts ==
Chart performance for "Coming Up You"
Chart (1988)	Peak position
US Billboard Hot 100	74
US Adult Contemporary (Billboard)	37
US Cash Box Top 100 Singles	83
