= The Lace =

Studio album by Benjamin Orr
- Released: October 6, 1986
- Recorded: 1986
- Studio: The Wool Hall (Beckington, England); Blue Jay (Carlisle, Massachusetts)
- Genre: Pop rock
- Length: 45:05
- Label: Elektra
- Producer: Mike Shipley; Benjamin Orr; Larry Klein

Singles from The Lace
- 1. "Stay the Night" Released: October 1986; 2. "Too Hot to Stop" Released: February 1987

Professional ratings
Review scores
Source	Rating
AllMusic	3/5 stars

The Lace is the only solo studio album by American pop rock singer Benjamin Orr, best known for his work with American new wave band the Cars. It was released on October 6, 1986, by Elektra Records and features his only solo hit, the song "Stay the Night", which reached No. 24 on the U.S. Billboard Hot 100 chart in 1987. The follow-up single "Too Hot to Stop" failed to chart. Wounded Bird Records re-released the album on CD on August 15, 2006.

== Track listing ==
All tracks are written by Benjamin Orr and Diane Grey Page.

Side one
No.	Title	Length
1.	"Too Hot to Stop"	4:18
2.	"In Circles"	4:32
3.	"Stay the Night"	4:26
4.	"Skyline"	4:10
5.	"When You're Gone"	4:51

Side two
No.	Title	Length
6.	"Spinning"	4:27
7.	"Hold On"	4:30
8.	"The Lace"	4:20
9.	"That's the Way"	4:07
10.	"This Time Around"	5:10
Total length:		45:05

== Personnel ==
Credits adapted from AllMusic.

- Benjamin Orr – lead and backing vocals, bass, keyboards, drum programming, production
- Diane Grey Page – backing vocals
- Michael Landau – guitars
- Elliot Easton – guitars
- Larry Klein – keyboards, production

Technical personnel

- Mike Shipley – production, engineering and recording
- Thom Moore – additional engineering and mixing (except "Stay the Night" and "Too Hot to Stop")
- Mike Shipley – mixing on "Stay the Night" and "Too Hot to Stop"
- Bob Ludwig – mastering at Master disk
- All songs published by Orange Village Music (ASCAP)

== Charts ==
Chart (1987)	Peak position
US Billboard 200	86
