= Why Can't I Have You =

- UK picture sleeve

Single by the Cars

from the album Heartbeat City
- B-side: "Breakaway"
- Released: January 7, 1985
- Recorded: 1983–1984
- Studio: Battery (Willesden, London)
- Genre: New wave
- Length: 4:04
- Label: Elektra
- Songwriter: Ric Ocasek
- Producers: Robert John "Mutt" Lange; the Cars

The Cars singles chronology
"Hello Again" (1984)	"Why Can't I Have You" (1985)	"Heartbeat City" (1985)

Music video
- "Why Can't I Have You" on YouTube

"Why Can't I Have You" is a song by American rock band the Cars from their fifth studio album, Heartbeat City (1984). It was released on January 7, 1985, as the album's fifth single. Written by Ric Ocasek, the song is a lush ballad.

== Release ==
Cash Box reviewed the single, saying that "this moody piece of peculiarly American synth-pop is pure Ric Ocasek: broken romance lyrics, angular musical backing and a handful of melodic hooks."

Although it did not reach the top 20 like its four predecessors, "Why Can't I Have You" managed to reach number 33 on the Billboard Hot 100, as well as number 11 on the Top Rock Tracks chart. The song was the final single from Heartbeat City released in the United States; in the United Kingdom, however, a sixth single, "Heartbeat City", was released after "Why Can't I Have You".

It was also the final Heartbeat City video, and achieved Power Rotation on MTV.

== B-side ==
The B-side of "Why Can't I Have You" was the non-album track "Breakaway", described as having "Euro-disco undertones" in the liner notes of Just What I Needed: The Cars Anthology (1995).

== Charts ==
Chart performance for "Why Can't I Have You"
Chart (1985)	Peak position
Canada Top Singles (RPM)	90
US Billboard Hot 100	33
US Mainstream Rock (Billboard)	11
US Adult Contemporary (Billboard)	38
US Cash Box Top 100 Singles	34
