= Blue Tip =

Song by the Cars

from the album Move Like This
- Released: May 10, 2011
- Recorded: 2010–2011
- Genre: Rock; new wave
- Length: 3:13
- Label: Concord Music Group
- Songwriter: Ric Ocasek
- Producer: Jacknife Lee

"Blue Tip" is a song by the American rock band the Cars from their seventh and final studio album Move Like This (2011). The song was written and sung by Cars lead vocalist and songwriter Ric Ocasek.

== Release ==
The song was originally previewed by the band as a 73-second sample on their Facebook page in October 2010. A full video for the song was released February 17, 2011.

The music video was co-produced by Eron Ocasek, one of Ric's sons.

== Reception ==
Billboard described the song's video as "trippy", and Ocasek as "possess[ing] the same vocal strength and sense of catchiness as he did on Cars hits like 'My Best Friend's Girl'." NPR's Elizabeth Nelson called the song "an incandescent pop gem", praising the song's musical structure and "absolutely relentless sing-along chorus". According to Rolling Stone reviewer Andy Greene, the video's "low-tech production fits well with [the] vintage nature of the song".

== Personnel ==
- Ric Ocasek – rhythm guitar, lead vocals
- Elliot Easton – lead guitar, background vocals
- Greg Hawkes – keyboards, bass, background vocals
- David Robinson – drums
