= Door to Door (album) =

1987 studio album by the Cars

Studio album by the Cars
- Released: August 25, 1987
- Recorded: April–May 1987
- Studio: Electric Lady (New York City)
- Genre: Pop rock
- Length: 46:43
- Label: Elektra
- Producer: Ric Ocasek

The Cars chronology
Greatest Hits (1985)	Door to Door (1987)	Just What I Needed: The Cars Anthology (1995)

Singles from Door to Door
- 1. "You Are the Girl" Released: August 1987; 2. "Strap Me In" Released: October 19, 1987; 3. "Coming Up You" Released: January 1988

Professional ratings
Review scores
Source	Rating
AllMusic	2.5/5 stars
The Encyclopedia of Popular Music	1/5 stars
The Rolling Stone Album Guide	1/5 stars

Door to Door is the sixth studio album by American new wave band the Cars, released on August 25, 1987, by Elektra Records. The album was produced by frontman Ric Ocasek, with additional production by keyboardist Greg Hawkes. Three singles were released from the album, though only "You Are the Girl" reached the top 40 of the U.S. Billboard Hot 100, peaking at No. 17. Door to Door became the Cars' lowest-charting studio album, peaking at No. 26 on the Billboard 200, and within a year of its release the band would break up. It was The Cars' last studio record until Move Like This (2011), and their final album with bassist Benjamin Orr, who died of cancer ten years before the band's reformation in 2010.

== Background ==
By 1987 the Cars had reached the heights of superstardom, but Door to Door was an attempt to return to the band's original roots. For example, where the previous studio album, Heartbeat City (1984), extensively used sampled and sequenced drums (a move that had somewhat alienated drummer David Robinson), this album returned to having Robinson performing the drums in the studio, often simultaneously with other band members.

During a writing jam session, the band began to play "Ta Ta Wayo Wayo", a song from their earliest days together. It had never been recorded in studio, except as a demo in 1977. They enjoyed the tune so much that the 1987 version of the song made it onto the album. The opening track, "Leave or Stay", also was originally a 1977 demo that was not properly recorded until Door to Door, although they had often played the song live in the band's early days. Both tracks had their respective 1977 demo versions eventually issued on the compilation album Just What I Needed: The Cars Anthology (1995).

The lead single from the album, "You Are the Girl", reached No. 17 on the Billboard Hot 100 and number two on the Album Rock Tracks chart. The follow-up single, "Strap Me In", peaked at number 85 on the Hot 100, while reaching number four on the rock chart. The final single, "Coming Up You", peaked at No. 74 on the Hot 100, as well as No. 37 on the Hot Adult Contemporary chart.

== Track listing ==
All tracks are written by Ric Ocasek, except where noted.

Side one
No.	Title	Vocals	Length
1.	"Leave or Stay"	Ocasek	2:55
2.	"You Are the Girl"	Ocasek; Benjamin Orr	3:52
3.	"Double Trouble"	Orr	4:14
4.	"Fine Line"	Ocasek	5:22
5.	"Everything You Say"	Orr	4:52
6.	"Ta Ta Wayo Wayo"	Ocasek	2:52

Side two
No.	Title	Writer(s)	Vocals	Length
7.	"Strap Me In"		Ocasek	4:22
8.	"Coming Up You"		Orr	4:18
9.	"Wound Up on You"		Ocasek	5:02
10.	"Go Away"	Ocasek; Greg Hawkes	Orr	4:38
11.	"Door to Door"		Ocasek	3:17
Total length:				46:43

== Personnel ==
Credits adapted from the liner notes of Door to Door.

=== The Cars ===
- Ric Ocasek – vocals, guitar
- Benjamin Orr – vocals, bass guitar
- Greg Hawkes – vocals, keyboards
- Elliot Easton – vocals, guitar
- David Robinson – vocals, drums

=== Technical ===
- Ric Ocasek – production
- Greg Hawkes – additional production
- Joe Barbaria – recording, mixing engineering
- George Marino – LP mastering
- Stephen Innocenzi – CD mastering
- Jamie Chaleff – second engineer
- David Heglmeier, Brian Sklarz, Tracy Wiener – special assistance
- Andy Topeka – technical assistance

=== Artwork ===
- Marco Glaviano – cover design, photography
- Emanuele DiLiberto – painting

== Charts ==
=== Weekly charts ===
Weekly chart performance for Door to Door
Chart (1987)	Peak position
Australian Albums (Kent Music Report)	26
Canada Top Albums/CDs (RPM)	19
European Albums (Music & Media)	63
Finnish Albums (Suomen virallinen lista)	28
German Albums (Offizielle Top 100)	57
New Zealand Albums (RMNZ)	10
Norwegian Albums (VG-lista)	9
Swedish Albums (Sverigetopplistan)	29
Swiss Albums (Schweizer Hitparade)	20
UK Albums (Official Charts)	72
US Billboard 200	26

=== Year-end charts ===
Year-end chart performance for Door to Door
Chart (1987)	Position
Canada Top Albums/CDs (RPM)	88
