= Alex Weil =

American music video director

Alex Weil (July 31, 1951 – April 17, 2019) was the founder and executive creative director of the New York City based digital design and production studio Charlex (now CHRLX), which he founded alongside Charlie Levi (the company's name is a portmentau of their first names). He was awarded the "Video of the Year" MTV Video Music Award in 1984 for directing "You Might Think" by The Cars, and also wrote and directed the SIGGRAPH award-winning short digital animation One Rat Short.

Prior to his entry into the video industry, he was the bassist in the short-lived band Last Men, with two releases in 1979.
