= One Rat Short =

One Rat Short is a short digital animation, written and directed by Alex Weil. It was awarded a Best of Show award at the SIGGRAPH 2006 Computer Animation Festival.
