= You Are the Girl =

Single by the Cars

from the album Door to Door
- B-side: "Ta Ta Wayo Wayo"
- Released: August 1987
- Recorded: 1987
- Genre: Synth-pop; pop rock; new wave
- Length: 3:52
- Label: Elektra
- Songwriter: Ric Ocasek
- Producer: Ric Ocasek

The Cars singles chronology
"I'm Not the One" (1986)	"You Are the Girl" (1987)	"Strap Me In" (1987)

"You Are the Girl" is a song by the Cars, from their sixth studio album Door to Door (1987). It was released as a single in August 1987, reaching number 17 on the Billboard Hot 100. It also reached number 2 on the Mainstream Rock Tracks chart, and number 12 on the Adult Contemporary chart. It was the Cars' 13th and final Top 40 hit.

== Background ==
Rhythm guitarist and principal songwriter Ric Ocasek shares lead vocals with bassist Benjamin Orr on "You Are the Girl". Both singers had recently cracked the Top 40 with solo hits, Ocasek with 1986's "Emotion in Motion" and Orr with 1987's "Stay the Night". "You Are the Girl" was the Cars' first—and last—Top 40 hit after their 1987 regrouping following the band members' three-year hiatus to focus on solo work. It also became the second (and last) single after "Since I Held You" from "Candy-O" in which both singers shared vocals on a song.

The lyrics for the song are about an ex; the music video, directed by cult filmmaker John Waters, has been described as "alien-populated". In 1987, the Cars performed "You Are the Girl" and "Double Trouble" (another track from Door to Door) at the MTV Video Music Awards.

Cash Box called it a "likeable pop tune" with "slick production values."

== Aftermath ==
The song was recorded for what would be the band's final studio album for the next 25 years, and last with its five original members, 1987's Door to Door. It was recorded at a time of personal conflict between the band members that led to their eventual disbanding. Following the release of the album, there was public speculation that the band was breaking up, and within a year the Cars announced that they had disbanded.

Although "You Are the Girl" was the Cars' last Top 40 hit, two more singles released from Door to Door did reach the Top 100: 1987's "Strap Me In" (number 85) and 1988's "Coming Up You" (number 74).

== Charts ==
Chart performance for "You Are the Girl"
Chart (1987)	Peak position
Australia (Kent Music Report)	69
Canada Top Singles (RPM)	33
New Zealand (Recorded Music NZ)	30
US Billboard Hot 100	17
US Adult Contemporary (Billboard)	12
US Mainstream Rock (Billboard)	2
US Cash Box Top 100 Singles	17
