= DMZ (band) =

American punk rock band

- Origin: Boston, Massachusetts, U.S.
- Genres: Punk rock, garage punk
- Years active: 1975–1978, 1993, 2001–2003
- Labels: Bomp!, Sire
- Past members: Jeff Conolly; Rick Coraccio; Adam Schwartz; Peter Greenberg; Jack Hickey; Mike Lewis; Mike "Drums" Lewis; Paul Murphy; J. J. Rassler; David Robinson; Preston Wayne

DMZ was an American punk rock/garage rock band from Boston, Massachusetts, strongly influenced by 1960s garage rock.

== Background ==
In early 1976, Jeff "Monoman" Conolly stole the lead vocalist position in the nascent band by out-performing their singer at one of the band's practices. Along with his vocals he brought two things the band lacked: keyboards (an electric piano) and original songs.

Just over one year later, in April 1977, the band went into the recording studio with Craig Leon (who had produced the Ramones' first album). Four songs from that session were released by Bomp! on a seven-inch vinyl EP. One of the best known photographs of Bomp! founder Greg Shaw shows him holding this disc. DMZ was later signed by Sire Records and went to New York City to record their debut album, produced by Flo & Eddie.

The album was released in 1978 without much success and by the end of the year the group had splintered. Guitarists J. J. Rassler and Preston Wayne left to start the Odds, and Conolly, bassist Rick Coraccio and drummer Paul Murphy formed Lyres.

DMZ has re-formed periodically; a 1993 set appears on the Live at the Rat album (along with eight tracks from a 1976 show).

Early drummer David Robinson (who had previously been in the Modern Lovers) left DMZ to join the Cars. Bassist Mike Lewis later joined the Lyres and later recorded with the A-Bones and Yo La Tengo. Guitarist Peter Greenberg later joined Lyres and went on to found Barrence Whitfield and the Savages.

== Members ==
- Jeff Conolly – vocals, keyboards
- Rick Coraccio – bass guitar
- Peter Greenberg – lead guitar
- Jack Hickey – guitar
- Mike Lewis – bass guitar
- Mike "Drums" Lewis – drums
- Paul Murphy – drums
- J. J. Rassler – guitar
- David Robinson – drums
- Adam Schwartz – lead singer
- John Smith (Bernardo) – drums
- Preston Wayne – guitar

== Partial discography ==
_ DMZ Telstar Records 45 RPM Produced by DMZ March/April, 1976 Released in 1986 with Mike Lewis bass, Jay Jay Rassler- rhythm guitar

- First Time Is The Best Time
- Teenage Head (originally recorded by the Flamin' Groovies)
- DMZ EP (1977, Bomp!)
1. "Lift Up Your Hood"
2. "Busy Man"
3. "You're Gonna Miss Me" (originally recorded by the 13th Floor Elevators)
4. "When I Get Off"
- DMZ LP (1978, Sire)
1. "Mighty Idy"
2. "Bad Attitude"
3. "Watch for Me Girl"
4. "Cinderella" (originally recorded by the Sonics)
5. "Don't Jump Me Mother"
6. "Destroyer"
7. "Baby Boom"
8. "Out of Our Tree" (originally recorded by the Wailers)
9. "Border Line"
10. "Do Not Enter"
11. "From Home" (originally recorded by the Troggs)
- Relics LP (1981, Voxx/Bomp!)
  - Includes the complete DMZ EP, as well as five previously unreleased four-track demos recorded April 1977:
1. "Can't Stand the Pain" (originally recorded by the Pretty Things)
2. "Do Not Enter"
3. "Shirt Loop"
4. "Guilty Child"
5. "Barracuda" (originally recorded by the Standells)
- "Live at Barnaby's - 1978" LP (1986, Crypt Records)
  - Recorded live at Barnaby's, Methuen, Massachusetts, on June 2, 1978:
1. "Watch For Me Girl"
2. "Come On Now"
3. "Raw Power"
4. "Don't Jump Me Mother"
5. "Frenzy"
6. "From Home"
7. "When I Get Off"
8. "Destroyer"
9. "In Motion"
10. "Nobody But Me"
11. "Cinderella"
12. "Out Of Our Tree"
13. "Mighty Idy"
14. "It's All Right"
15. "He's Waiting"
16. "You Left The Water Running"
17. "You're Gonna Miss Me"
- "When I Get Off"—The Classic Originals CD (1993, Voxx/Bomp!)
  - Includes same five demos as on Relics, plus live radio recordings (July 1976, WTBS, Cambridge, Massachusetts):
1. "Busy Man"
2. "You're Gonna Miss Me"
3. "When I Get Off"
4. "Lift Up Your Hood"
5. "Comin' After Me" (originally recorded by The Flamin' Groovies)
6. "Bloody Englishmen"
7. "First Time"
8. "Oedipus Show"
9. "Rosalyn" (originally recorded by the Pretty Things)
10. "Mighty Idy"
11. "From Home"
12. "Are You Gonna Be There" (originally recorded by the Chocolate Watch Band)
13. "Pretty Girl"
- Live at the Rat CD (2001, Bomp!)
  - Recorded in 1976 + 1993
1. "Intro by Oedipus"
2. "First Time (Is the Best Time)"
3. "Boy from Nowhere"
4. "Ball Me Out"
5. "Lift Up Your Hood"
6. "Go to School"
7. "Watch for Me Girl"
8. "Boy from Nowhere"
9. "Raw Power" (originally recorded by Iggy and the Stooges)
10. "Cinderella"
11. "He's Waitin'"
12. "Don't Jump Me Mother"
13. "Frenzy" (originally recorded by the Fugs)
14. "When I Get Off"
15. "Out of Our Tree"
16. "Mighty Idy"
17. "You're Gonna Miss Me"
18. "Don't Start Cryin' Now" (originally recorded by Slim Harpo; also recorded by Them)
19. "Ball Me Out"
20. "Boy from Nowhere"

== Sources ==
- Grunnen Rocks
- Simmons, Doug (April 28, 1981). "Beyond the DMZ". The Boston Phoenix.
