= DMZ (DMZ album) =

D.M.Z.

Studio album by DMZ
- Released: 1978
- Genre: Punk rock
- Label: Sire
- Producer: Flo & Eddie

DMZ chronology
DMZ EP (1977)	D.M.Z. (1978)	Relics (1981)

Professional ratings
Review scores
Source	Rating
AllMusic	4/5 stars
Trouser Press	unfavorable

D.M.Z. is the debut studio album by American punk rock band DMZ, released in 1978 by record label Sire.

== Track listing ==
Side one

1. Mighty Idy — 2:25
2. Bad Attitude — 3:00
3. Watch For Me Girl —2:20
4. Cinderella — 2:45
5. Don't Jump Me Mother — 3:22

Side two

6. Destroyer — 2:15
7. Baby Boom — 2:20
8. Out Of Our Tree — 3:00
9. Border Line — 2:35
10. Do Not Enter — 2:15
11. From Home — 1:35

== Personnel ==
- Mono Mann (Jeff Conolly) — vocals, organ
- J. Rassler – guitar
- Peter Greenberg – guitar
- Rick Corraccio – bass
- Paul Murphy – drums
