= Move Like This =

Studio album by the Cars
- Released: May 10, 2011
- Recorded: 2010–2011
- Studios: The Village Recorder, Los Angeles, California; Millbrook Sound Studios, Millbrook, New York
- Genres: Pop rock; art rock; garage rock; power pop
- Length: 37:46
- Labels: Hear Music; Concord
- Producers: The Cars; Jacknife Lee

The Cars chronology
| Original Album Series (2010) | Move Like This (2011) | Studio Album Collection: 1978–1987 (2014) |

Singles from Move Like This
- 1. "Sad Song" Released: March 1, 2011

Move Like This is the seventh and final studio album by American rock band the Cars, released on May 10, 2011. It was their first since 1987's Door to Door, and the only one without bassist and co-vocalist Benjamin Orr, who had died of pancreatic cancer in 2000.

The album reached the top ten of the Billboard 200 and peaked at number 2 on the Billboard Top Rock Albums chart; a single from the album, "Sad Song", reached number 33 on the Billboard Rock Songs chart. Following the release of the album, the band launched an 11-city tour of North America. Move Like This was Ric Ocasek's last studio appearance before his death in September 2019.

== Background ==
In 1997, Ocasek had told a journalist that the band would never reunite: "I'm saying never and you can count on that." A partial reunion of the band occurred in 2005 when keyboardist Greg Hawkes and lead guitarist Elliot Easton toured with singer Todd Rundgren, drummer Prairie Prince and bassist Kasim Sulton as the New Cars; neither Ocasek nor Cars drummer David Robinson participated, and the Rundgren lineup split following two years of touring.

According to Paste magazine, Ocasek said that he was "amazed at how we clicked when we got back together." Exclaim! magazine has noted that the Cars' Facebook page featured a picture of producer Jacknife Lee, "which suggests that he will be producing the new album." According to Rolling Stone, Lee produced five of the songs from the album; the Cars themselves produced the others.

The Cars did not add a new bassist to the lineup to replace Orr; instead, the album's bass parts were programmed or performed by Hawkes and Lee, with Hawkes playing a bass once owned by Orr. While Ocasek and Orr split vocal duties on past albums, Move Like This is the only album to feature Ocasek as the sole lead vocalist. In a Rolling Stone interview, Ocasek said, "I was aware that on half of the new songs, Ben would have done better than I did. But we never wanted anybody from the outside." Orr was given special thanks in the liner notes: "Ben, your spirit was with us on this one."

According to Billboard, the album was recorded in engineer Paul Orofino's studio in Millbrook, New York. Additional recording sessions were held in Los Angeles. The title of the album comes from a line in the song "Too Late"; one of the working titles for the album was Sharp Subtle Flavor. Ocasek decided to title the album Move Like This as a reference to the band's reputation for not moving around very much onstage.

== Release and reception ==
Professional ratings
Aggregate scores
| Source | Rating |
|---|---|
| Metacritic | 68/100 |
Review scores
| Source | Rating |
| AllMusic | 3.5/5 stars |
| The A.V. Club | B |
| Consequence of Sound | 3.5/5 stars |
| Entertainment Weekly | B+ |
| The Guardian | 3/5 stars |
| PopMatters | 6/10 |
| Q | 3/5 stars |
| Rolling Stone | 3.5/5 stars |
| Spin | 5/10 |
| Uncut | 8/10 |

In October 2010, the band released a one-minute clip of "Sad Song" and a 73-second sample of another track from the album, "Blue Tip", on their Facebook page; a snippet from a third track, "Free", was later posted on the band's page. FMQB described "Free" as a "return to the classic Cars sound that fans know and love."

On February 17, 2011, the band posted the full video for "Blue Tip" on their Facebook page. The first single, released in March, was the track "Sad Song". Exclaim! comments that "[d]espite the title and lyrics, it doesn't sound particularly sad, as it contains a cheery beat and a catchy mix of synths and guitars."

Move Like This was released on May 10, 2011, and debuted at #7 on the Billboard 200 albums chart. The album received generally positive reviews from critics: in a three-and-a-half-star review, Rolling Stone praised the "skillful restraint" of the band and Lee's production work, describing the album as "taut, sleek, seamless, [and] efficient". The A.V. Club awarded the album a "B" rating, praising the "catchy" "Blue Tip" and "Sad Song", and noting the latter song's similarity to "My Best Friend's Girl" from the band's 1978 debut. AllMusic reviewer Stephen Thomas Erlewine rated the album four out of five stars, describing the album as "as bright, infectious, and tuneful as the Cars at their prime." Spin, however, granted the album a 5 out of 10 rating, criticizing the "clunkiness" of Ocasek's lyrics. NPR's Elizabeth Nelson called Move Like This a "fine new album" and singled out "Blue Tip" as "an incandescent pop gem" with a "brilliant" musical structure and "an absolutely relentless sing-along chorus". However, "Sad Song" and "Free" ended up being the only singles lifted from the album; "Sad Song" charted but "Free" (the final Cars single to be released) did not chart.

== North American tour ==
In April 2011, the band announced a North American tour to support the album. The 11-city tour began May 10 in Seattle and concluded May 26 at the House of Blues in Boston. The performances and set lists were met with mixed reviews: The Hollywood Reporter reviewer Erik Pedersen found Move Like This to be a "surprisingly good" album but described the May 12 Hollywood Palladium show as "icy" and unenthusiastic. San Jose Mercury News reviewer Jim Harrington described the band's performance at Oakland's Fox Theater as "incredibly flat and dispassionate", but praised the band's "solid" musicianship.

The Cars appeared on Late Night with Jimmy Fallon in both May and September with performances filmed in May in support of the album. In August, the band participated in Lollapalooza in Chicago then two nights later appeared on The Colbert Report, performing "Keep On Knocking" from Move Like This and "My Best Friend's Girl" from their debut album.

Songs performed on the tour include Move Like This tracks "Blue Tip", "Keep on Knocking", "Sad Song", "Free", "Drag on Forever" and "Hits Me", as well as material from the band's 1970s and 1980s albums. On the tour, Orr's bass parts were performed by Hawkes on keyboard and bass, while the vocals on songs originally sung by Orr ("Just What I Needed", "Let's Go" and "Moving in Stereo") were performed by Ocasek.

== Track listing ==
All tracks are written by Ric Ocasek, except where noted

Move Like This track listing
| No. | Title | Producer | Length |
|---|---|---|---|
| 1. | "Blue Tip" | Jacknife Lee | 3:13 |
| 2. | "Too Late" | The Cars | 4:01 |
| 3. | "Keep On Knocking" | The Cars | 3:52 |
| 4. | "Soon" | Jacknife Lee | 4:23 |
| 5. | "Sad Song" | Jacknife Lee | 3:38 |
| 6. | "Free" | Jacknife Lee | 3:17 |
| 7. | "Drag On Forever" | The Cars | 3:37 |
| 8. | "Take Another Look" | The Cars | 4:46 |
| 9. | "It's Only" | The Cars | 3:01 |
| 10. | "Hits Me" | Jacknife Lee | 3:51 |

=== Best Buy edition ===
| No. | Title | Writer(s) | Length |
|---|---|---|---|
| 11. | "One by One" (demo version) | | 3:52 |
| 12. | "Hits Me" (demo version) | | 3:40 |
| 13. | "Rocket USA" (demo version) | Vega, Reverby | 5:04 |

This enhanced CD also has videos for "Sad Song" and "Blue Tip". "Rocket USA" is a cover of a 1977 song by the American band Suicide, from their self-titled debut.

=== iTunes and Japan editions ===
| No. | Title | Length |
|---|---|---|
| 11. | "Blue Tip" (demo version) | 2:58 |

== Personnel ==
The Cars

- Ric Ocasek – lead and backing vocals, guitars, keyboards
- Elliot Easton – guitars, backing vocals
- Greg Hawkes – keyboards, guitars, bass, backing vocals
- David Robinson – drums, percussion, backing vocals

Additional personnel

- Jacknife Lee – bass, guitar
- Mixed by Rich Costey
- Digital Engineer – Charlie Stavish
- Mastered by Vlado Meller

Tracks 1, 4, 5, 6 and 10

- Produced by Jacknife Lee
- Engineered by Sam Bell
- Assisted by Chris Owens and Vanessa Parr
- Editing by Jared Scott

Tracks 2, 3, 7, 8 and 9

- Produced by the Cars
- Engineered by Stephen George
- Assisted by Paul Orofino

== Chart performance ==
=== Weekly charts ===
Weekly chart performance for Move Like This
| Chart (2011) | Peak position |
|---|---|
| US Billboard 200 | 7 |
| US Top Rock Albums (Billboard) | 2 |

=== Year-end charts ===
Year-end chart performance for Move Like This
| Chart (2011) | Position |
|---|---|
| US Top Rock Albums (Billboard) | 75 |
