= Drive (The Cars song) =

1984 single by the Cars

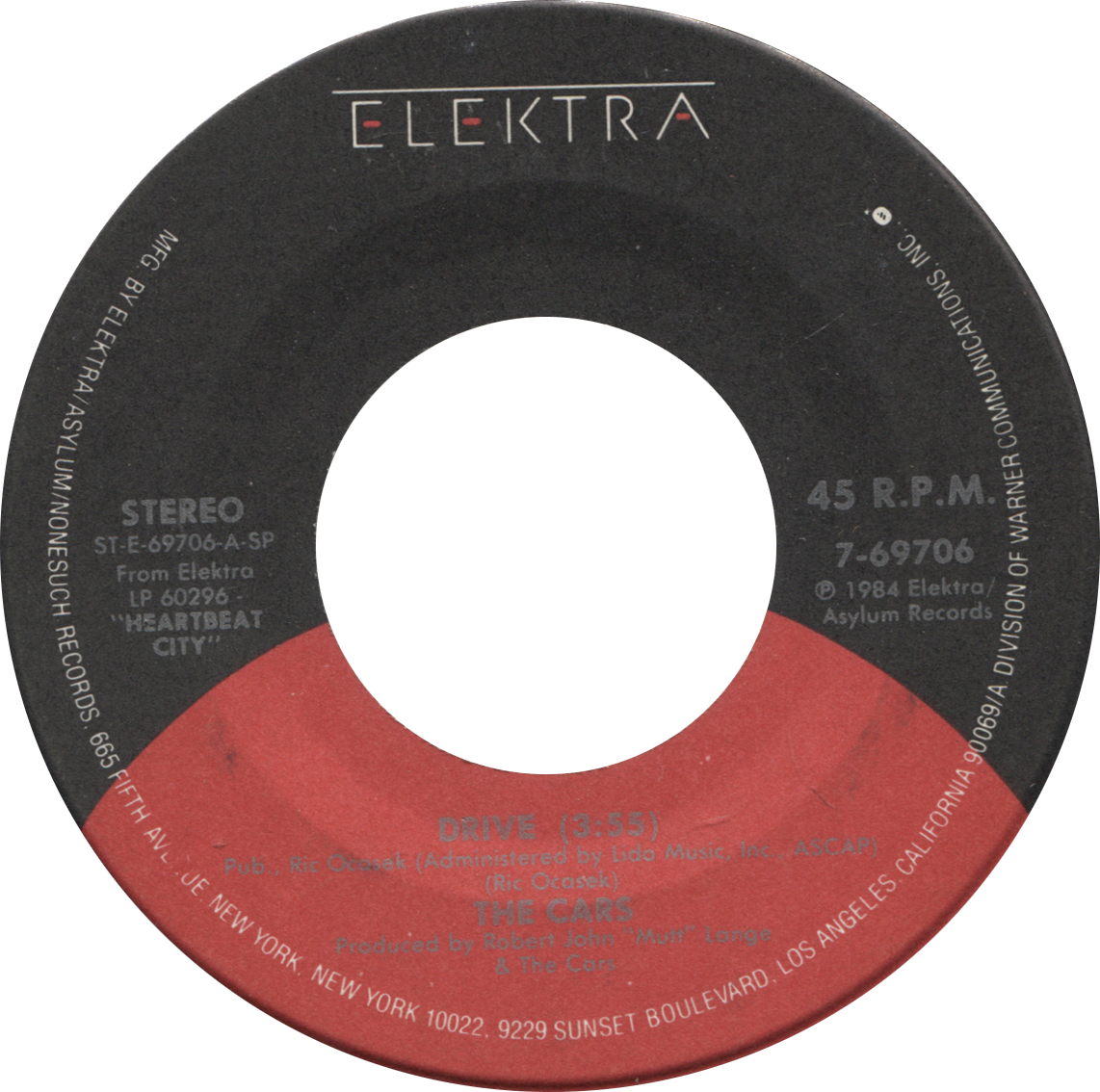
- Side A of the US 7-inch single

Single by the Cars

from the album Heartbeat City
- B-side: "Stranger Eyes"; "My Best Friend's Girl"
- Released: July 23, 1984
- Studio: Battery (London, England)
- Genre: Synth-rock; soft rock
- Length: 3:55
- Label: Elektra
- Songwriter: Ric Ocasek
- Producers: Robert John "Mutt" Lange; the Cars

The Cars singles chronology
"Magic" (1984)	"Drive" (1984)	"Hello Again" (1984)

Music video
- "Drive" on YouTube

Audio sample
- "Drive": file; help

"Drive" is a song by American rock band the Cars from their fifth studio album, Heartbeat City (1984). It was released on July 23, 1984, as the album's third single. Written by Ric Ocasek, the track was sung by bassist Benjamin Orr and produced by Robert John "Mutt" Lange with the band. Upon its release, "Drive" became the Cars' highest-charting single in most territories. In the United States, it peaked at number three on the Billboard Hot 100 and topped the Adult Contemporary chart. It reached number five (number four on re-entry in 1985) in the United Kingdom, number four in West Germany, number six in Canada and number three (number five on re-entry in 1985) in Ireland.

The song is most associated with the July 1985 Live Aid event, where it was performed by the Cars during the Philadelphia event. The song was also used as the background music to a montage of clips produced by CBC Television depicting the contemporaneous Ethiopian famine during the London event, which was introduced by British musician David Bowie. Following the concert, it re-entered the UK Singles Chart and peaked at number four in August 1985. Proceeds from the sales of the re-released song raised nearly £160,000 for the Band Aid Trust; Ocasek presented the charity's trustee Midge Ure with a cheque for the amount while he was in London in November 1986 promoting his solo album This Side of Paradise.

== Lyrics and music ==
The lyrics of "Drive" deal with a relationship that the singer has become concerned about, with lines such as "Who’s gonna tell you when it's too late? Who’s gonna tell you things aren't so great?"

The instrumentation is nearly entirely electronic, with Greg Hawkes' synthesizers and Elliot Easton's guitar providing a "haunting" atmosphere and musical structure.

== Critical reception ==
In a retrospective review of the single, AllMusic journalist Donald A. Guarisco praised the song for being "a gorgeous ballad that matches heartfelt songwriting to an alluring electronic soundscape. The music reflects the lyrical tone with a lovely melody that rises and falls in a soothing yet sad fashion."

Classic Rock History critic Brian Kachejian rated it as the Cars' third greatest song, stating that it "sounds like nothing else the band ever did." Classic Rock History critic Emily Fagan rated it as the Cars second best song sung by Orr, praising the way that the "careful arrangement frames the lyrics poignantly, with each line delivered by Orr pulling at the listener’s heartstrings." Ultimate Classic Rock critic Dave Swanson rated it as the 7th best Benjamin Orr Cars song, acknowledging that "the super gloss production of Mutt Lange ultimately makes it sound a bit dated."

Paul McCartney cited the song as an influence on the sound he achieved on his 1986 album Press to Play, commenting, "Sometimes you get caught up in trying to be the current flavor, trying to go along and flavor your cooking with the food of the month ... I remember the records I listened to. 'Let's Dance'. Or 'Drive' by the Cars. Records that were of the time and I probably just thought, 'Yeah, it'd be quite nice to get into a bit of that'."

== Music video ==
The music video was directed by actor Timothy Hutton and features then-19-year-old model and actress Paulina Porizkova, who would later become Ric Ocasek's third wife.

The video alternates between shots of Orr sitting in a disused nightclub, facing mannequins posed at the bar as customers and bartender, and scenes that depict the breakdown of a relationship between the characters played by Ocasek and Porizkova. Ultimately left alone, the woman cries and laughs hysterically for a time before visiting the nightclub. She sadly looks in through a smeared window at the stage, on which tuxedo-clad mannequins of the band members are posed with their instruments as if playing a show, and turns to walk away as the video ends.

Hutton later recalled that his directing the video came about because he was living next to Elliot Roberts, the manager of the Cars. They were listening to tracks from the then-unreleased album Heartbeat City and Hutton told Roberts he was particularly impressed by "Drive".

At that time, everybody was making videos. It was the height of MTV, and when you made a record, you were also thinking about the video. I talked to Elliott about how much I liked that song "Drive," and I started describing all the different ways I thought they could go with it, as far as the video. And he said, "You know, everything you're saying sounds really interesting. Do you mind if… Would you be up for me passing that concept along to Ric Ocasek?" I said, "Sure!" So he got back to me the next day and said, "Ric and I think you should direct the video. We love your idea, your take on it." So that's how that happened. And about a month later, I was in New York at the Astoria Studios over two days, filming the video.

Hutton and Ric Ocasek became friends, which led to Ocasek being cast in the 1987 film Made in Heaven.

== Track listings ==
- 7-inch single

A. "Drive" – 3:55
B. "Stranger Eyes" – 4:26

- 12-inch single

A. "Drive" – 3:55
B1. "My Best Friend's Girl" – 3:44
B2. "Stranger Eyes" – 4:26

== Charts ==
=== Weekly charts ===
1984–1985 weekly chart performance for "Drive"
Chart (1984–1985)	Peak position
Australia (Kent Music Report)	10
Austria (Ö3 Austria Top 40)	8
Belgium (Ultratop 50 Flanders)	11
Canada Top Singles (RPM)	6
Canada Adult Contemporary (RPM)	1
Canada (The Record)	5
Europe (European Top 100 Singles)	9
Finland (Suomen virallinen lista)	11
Ireland (IRMA)	3
Netherlands (Dutch Top 40)	14
Netherlands (Single Top 100)	12
New Zealand (Recorded Music NZ)	5
Norway (VG-lista)	9
South Africa (Springbok Radio)	11
Sweden (Sverigetopplistan)	15
Switzerland (Schweizer Hitparade)	3
UK Singles (Official Charts)	4
US Billboard Hot 100	3
US Adult Contemporary (Billboard)	1
US Mainstream Rock (Billboard)	3
US Cash Box Top 100 Singles	4
West Germany (GfK)	4

2019 weekly chart performance for "Drive"
Chart (2019)	Peak position
Canadian Digital Song Sales (Billboard)	44
US Digital Song Sales (Billboard)	27
US Hot Rock & Alternative Songs (Billboard)	6

2020 weekly chart performance for "Drive"
Chart (2020)	Peak position
Slovenia (SloTop50)	47

2025 weekly chart performance for "Drive"
Chart (2025)	Peak position
Israel International Airplay (Media Forest)	18

=== Year-end charts ===
1984 year-end chart performance for "Drive"
Chart (1984)	Position
Australia (Kent Music Report)	67
Canada Top Singles (RPM)	42
New Zealand (RIANZ)	35
UK Singles (Gallup)	56
US Billboard Hot 100	41
US Adult Contemporary (Billboard)	13
US Cash Box Top 100 Singles	29

1985 year-end chart performance for "Drive"
Chart (1985)	Position
UK Singles (Gallup)	53

== Certifications ==
Region	Certification	Certified units/sales
New Zealand (RMNZ)	2× Platinum	60,000^{‡}
United Kingdom (BPI) Sales since 2004	Platinum	600,000^{‡}
^{‡} Sales+streaming figures based on certification alone.

== See also ==
- List of number-one adult contemporary singles of 1984 (U.S.)
