= Sad Song (The Cars song) =

Single by the Cars

from the album Move Like This
- Released: March 1, 2011
- Genre: Rock, new wave
- Label: Concord Music Group
- Songwriter: Ric Ocasek
- Producer: Jacknife Lee

The Cars singles chronology
"Coming Up You" (1988)	"Sad Song" (2011)

Audio sample
- "Sad Song": file; help

"Sad Song" is the lead single by the American rock band the Cars from their seventh and final studio album Move Like This (2011), and the second to last single put out in their lifetime, discounting reissues ("Free" would be their last, and did not chart). A brief clip of the track was released in December 2010; the full song was released to radio on March 1, 2011.

== Details ==
Exclaim! magazine comments on the song saying "[d]espite the title and lyrics, it doesn't sound particularly sad, as it contains a cheery beat and a catchy mix of synths and guitars". Critics have noted the similarity of "Sad Song" to the band's earlier singles, such as 1978's "My Best Friend's Girl" and 1979's "Let's Go".

"Sad Song" peaked at number 33 on the Billboard Rock Songs chart.

== Charts ==
Chart (2011)	Peak position
Canada Rock (Billboard)	49
US Hot Rock & Alternative Songs (Billboard)	33
