= Heartbeat City =

1984 studio album by the Cars

- The cover art (including an image of a 1971 Plymouth Duster 340 and an Alberto Vargas pin-up model) is from a 1972 piece by Peter Phillips called Art-O-Matic Loop di Loop.

Studio album by the Cars
- Released: March 12, 1984
- Recorded: July 1983 – January 1984
- Studios: Battery (Willesden, London)
- Genres: New wave; pop rock; power pop; soft rock; synth-pop
- Length: 38:41
- Label: Elektra
- Producers: Mutt Lange; The Cars

The Cars chronology
Shake It Up (1981)	Heartbeat City (1984)	Greatest Hits (1985)

Singles from Heartbeat City
- 1. "You Might Think" Released: February 1984; 2. "Magic" Released: May 7, 1984; 3. "Drive" Released: July 23, 1984; 4. "Hello Again" Released: October 15, 1984; 5. "Why Can't I Have You" Released: January 7, 1985; 6. "Heartbeat City" Released: September 23, 1985

Professional ratings
Review scores
Source	Rating
AllMusic	5/5 stars
The Baltimore Sun	4.5/5 stars
Chicago Tribune	3.5/4 stars
Classic Rock	9/10
Mojo	4/5 stars
Pitchfork	7.5/10
Rolling Stone	3/5 stars
The Rolling Stone Album Guide	3/5 stars
Under the Radar	8/10
The Village Voice	B+

Heartbeat City is the fifth studio album by American new wave band the Cars, released on March 12, 1984, by Elektra Records. This marks the band's first album not produced by long-time producer Roy Thomas Baker, instead opting to produce with Mutt Lange. The album was a major commercial success, certifying quadruple platinum in the U.S.

Considered a "comeback" album for the Cars, Heartbeat City represented a return to the success of the band's self-titled debut album. Numerous tracks from the album received airplay on modern rock and AOR stations, with the singles "Drive" and "You Might Think" reaching the top 10 of the Billboard Hot 100, while the album peaked at number three on the Billboard 200.

== Background and release ==
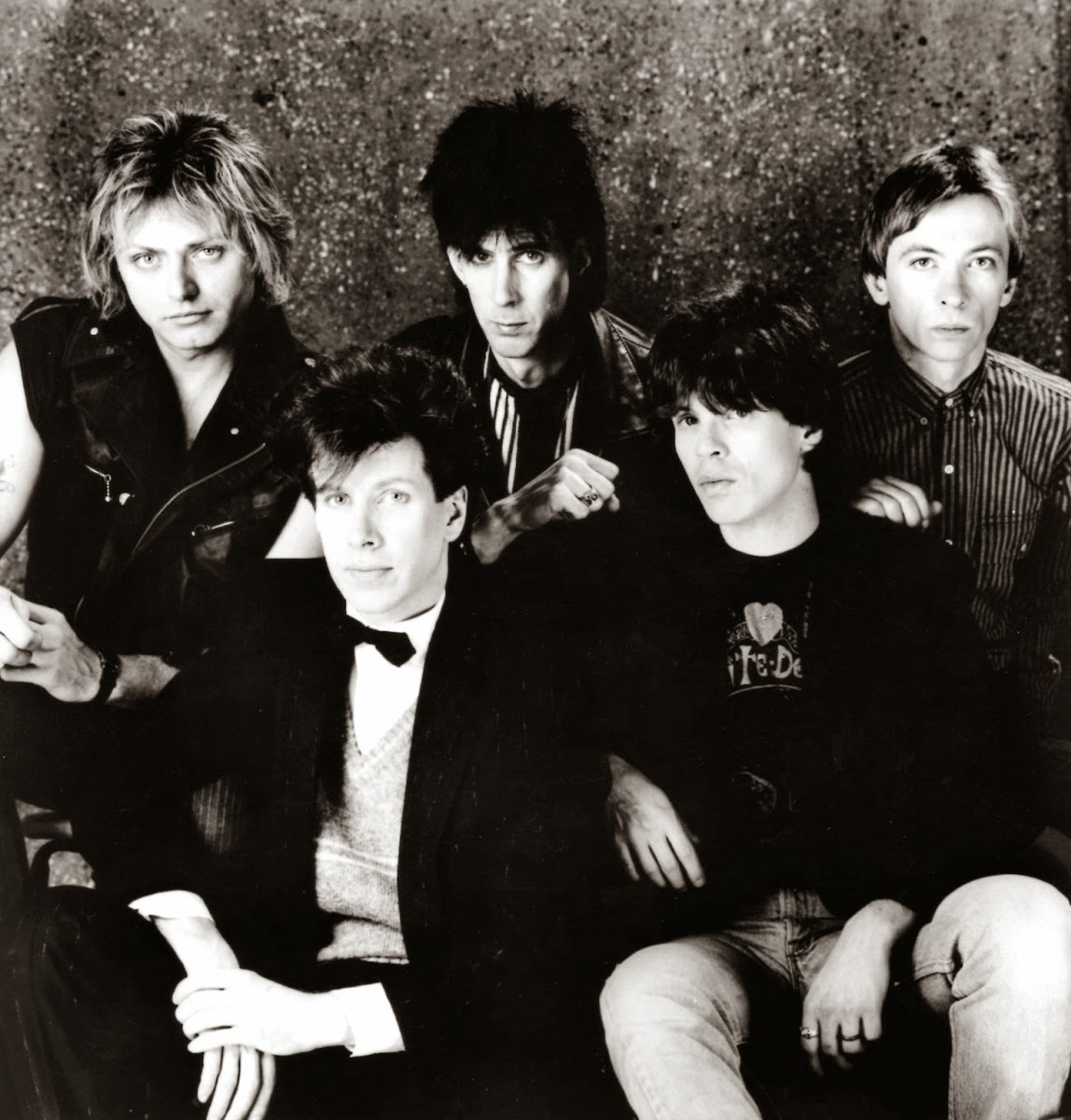
The Cars in a publicity photo for Heartbeat City, 1984

Heartbeat City was recorded at Battery Studios in Willesden, London with producer Mutt Lange. The band followed a method where the keyboards, guitars and vocals were recorded first to a LinnDrum click track, then the bass and drums were added. According to drummer David Robinson, all the drums and keyboards were sampled into and played or programmed via the Fairlight CMI, which he felt gave "a much better, cleaner, more controllable sound" for the album.

Heartbeat City spawned six singles. "Drive" and "You Might Think" reached the top 10 of the Billboard Hot 100, peaking at numbers three and seven, respectively. A number of songs from the album gained significant radio and television exposure, notably "Drive", "You Might Think" and "Magic", which all received heavy rotation on MTV. The title-track served as the album's sixth and final single outside North America.

The lead vocals on "Drive" were performed by bassist Benjamin Orr. The song's video was directed by actor and film director Timothy Hutton and features Ric Ocasek arguing with a troubled young woman played by fashion model Paulina Porizkova (whom Ocasek would later marry). "Hello Again" had a music video directed by Andy Warhol, who also appeared onscreen.

Despite not being released as a single, "It's Not the Night" reached number 31 on the Top Rock Tracks chart. The song "Stranger Eyes" was used in the theatrical trailer of the action drama film Top Gun (1986), but never made it onto the soundtrack. "Looking for Love" was covered by Austrian musician Falco as "Munich Girls" on his third studio album Falco 3 (1985).

When the Cars performed at Live Aid in 1985, they played three songs from the album ("You Might Think", "Drive", and the album's title-track), alongside the fan favorite "Just What I Needed".

The album was produced by Mutt Lange. His commitment to the Cars' album meant that he told Def Leppard he could not work on their fourth studio album Hysteria (1984). However, due to delays in that album's recording, Lange was eventually able to produce it.

== Track listing ==
All tracks are written by Ric Ocasek; "It's Not the Night" co-written with Greg Hawkes.

Side one
No.	Title	Vocals	Length
1.	"Hello Again"	Ocasek	3:47
2.	"Looking for Love"	Ocasek	3:52
3.	"Magic"	Ocasek	3:57
4.	"Drive"	Benjamin Orr	3:55
5.	"Stranger Eyes"	Orr	4:26

Side two
No.	Title	Vocals	Length
6.	"You Might Think"	Ocasek	3:04
7.	"It's Not the Night"	Orr; Ocasek	3:49
8.	"Why Can't I Have You"	Ocasek	4:04
9.	"I Refuse"	Ocasek	3:16
10.	"Heartbeat City"	Ocasek	4:31
Total length:			38:41

2018 expanded edition bonus tracks
No.	Title	Vocals	Length
11.	"Hello Again" (remix version)	Ocasek	5:57
12.	"Drive" (demo)	Orr	4:45
13.	"One More Time" (early version of "Why Can't I Have You")	Ocasek	3:59
14.	"Baby I Refuse" (early version of "I Refuse")	Ocasek	3:52
15.	"Jacki" (early version of "Heartbeat City")	Ocasek	4:16
16.	"Breakaway" (B-side of "Why Can't I Have You")	Ocasek	3:47
17.	"Tonight She Comes" (from Greatest Hits, 1985)	Ocasek	3:58
Total length:			69:15

=== Notes ===
- "Stranger Eyes" is titled "Stranger" on the label of early U.S. vinyl pressings, though the title is listed as "Stranger Eyes" on the inner sleeve.
- "Heartbeat City" is titled "Jacki" on the inner sleeve of early U.S. vinyl pressings, though the title is listed (correctly) as "Heartbeat City" on the label. On early cassette versions, the track is titled "Jacki" on the cassette insert, but as "Heartbeat City" on the actual tape.

=== Deluxe edition ===
In October 2025, Rhino Records released a four CD plus one LP deluxe edition.

All tracks are written by Ric Ocasek; "It's Not the Night" co-written by Greg Hawkes.

CD one: Original album
No.	Title	Length
1.	"Hello Again"	3:47
2.	"Looking for Love"	3:52
3.	"Magic"	3:57
4.	"Drive"	3:55
5.	"Stranger Eyes"	4:26
6.	"You Might Think"	3:04
7.	"It's Not the Night"	3:49
8.	"Why Can't I Have You"	4:04
9.	"I Refuse"	3:16
10.	"Heartbeat City"	4:31

CD two: Bonus Tracks, B-sides, Remixes, Early Versions, Demos & Alternate Versions
No.	Title	Length
1.	"Breakaway" (B-side to "Why Can't I Have You")	3:47
2.	"Hello Again" (Remix Version)	5:57
3.	"Hello Again" (Dub Version)	6:11
4.	"Drive" (Demo)	4:44
5.	"Stranger Eyes" (Early Version)	6:16
6.	"It's Not the Night" (Early Version)	3:49
7.	"One More Time" (Early Version Of "Why Can't I Have You")	3:59
8.	"Baby I Refuse" (Early Version Of "I Refuse")	3:51
9.	"Jacki" (Early Version Of "Heartbeat City")	4:15
10.	"Shooting for You" (First Version)	4:37
11.	"Shooting for You" (Re-Recorded Version)	5:23
12.	"Shooting for You" (Re-Recorded Version Alternate Mix)	4:03

CD three: Early Mixes
No.	Title	Length
1.	"Hello Again"	3:58
2.	"Looking for Love"	3:57
3.	"Magic"	4:01
4.	"Drive"	4:05
5.	"Stranger Eyes"	4:56
6.	"You Might Think"	3:09
7.	"It's Not the Night"	3:44
8.	"I Refuse" (Early Version / Early Mix)	3:07
9.	"Heartbeat City"	4:01
10.	"Breakaway"	3:58
11.	"Shooting for You" (First Version / Early Mix)	4:08
12.	"Shooting for You" (Re-Recorded Version)	4:41

CD four: Live at the Summit, Houston, TX, 09/11/1984
No.	Title	Length
1.	"Hello Again"	4:01
2.	"It's Not the Night"	3:58
3.	"Touch and Go"	5:02
4.	"Candy-O"	2:44
5.	"Good Times Roll"	3:34
6.	"Jimmy Jimmy"	4:39
7.	"Moving in Stereo"	5:33
8.	"Just What I Needed"	3:38
9.	"A Dream Away"	5:38
10.	"Cruiser"	5:10
11.	"Drive"	4:00
12.	"You Might Think"	3:10
13.	"My Best Friend's Girl"	3:43
14.	"Magic"	4:26
15.	"Let's Go"	3:45
16.	"Heartbeat City"	5:11
17.	"You're All I've Got Tonight"	5:05

140g black vinyl LP, Side one
No.	Title	Length
1.	"Hello Again"	3:47
2.	"Looking for Love"	3:52
3.	"Magic"	3:57
4.	"Drive"	3:55
5.	"Stranger Eyes"	4:26

Side two
No.	Title	Length
6.	"You Might Think"	3:04
7.	"It's Not the Night"	3:49
8.	"Why Can't I Have You"	4:04
9.	"I Refuse"	3:16
10.	"Heartbeat City"	4:31

== Personnel ==
Adapted from the album's liner notes.

The Cars

- Ric Ocasek – vocals, guitar
- Benjamin Orr – vocals, bass
- Elliot Easton – guitar, vocals
- Greg Hawkes – keyboards, vocals, Fairlight CMI programming
- David Robinson – drums, Fairlight CMI programming

Additional musicians

- Andy Topeka – Fairlight CMI programming

Production

- Robert John "Mutt" Lange; The Cars – producers
- Nigel Green – engineer
- Mike Shipley – mixing (at Electric Lady Studios, New York)
- George Marino – mastering (at Sterling Sound, New York)
- Andy Topeka; David Heglmeier; Steve Rance – assistant producers

Artwork

- Peter Phillips – cover painting ("Art-O-Matic Loop Di Loop")
- HSU/Cathy Henszey – art direction
- Doris Kloster; George Holz – photography
- David Robinson – cover design

== Charts ==
=== Weekly charts ===
Weekly chart performance for Heartbeat City
Chart (1984–1985)	Peak position
Australian Albums (Kent Music Report)	15
Canada Top Albums/CDs (RPM)	5
Dutch Albums (Album Top 100)	41
European Albums (Eurotipsheet)	33
German Albums (Offizielle Top 100)	15
New Zealand Albums (RMNZ)	1
Swedish Albums (Sverigetopplistan)	26
Swiss Albums (Schweizer Hitparade)	20
UK Albums (Official Charts)	25
US Billboard 200	3
US Rock Albums (Billboard)	1

=== Year-end charts ===
1984 year-end chart performance for Heartbeat City
Chart (1984)	Position
Australian Albums (Kent Music Report)	29
Canada Top Albums/CDs (RPM)	12
New Zealand Albums (RMNZ)	5
US Billboard 200	12

1985 year-end chart performance for Heartbeat City
Chart (1985)	Position
Canada Top Albums/CDs (RPM)	69
New Zealand Albums (RMNZ)	16
US Billboard 200	49

== Certifications ==
Certifications for Heartbeat City
Region	Certification	Certified units/sales
New Zealand (RMNZ)	Platinum	15,000^{^}
United Kingdom (BPI)	Gold	100,000^{^}
United States (RIAA)	4× Platinum	4,000,000^{^}
^{^} Shipments figures based on certification alone.
