= Benjamin Orr =

American musician (1947–2000)

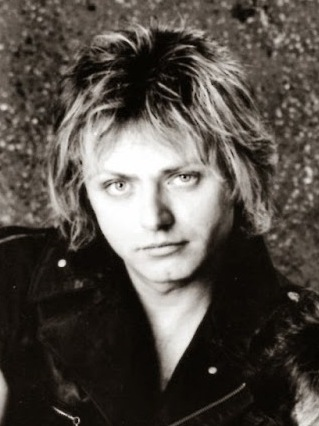
- Orr in 1984

Background information
- Also known as: Ben Orr
- Born: Benjamin Orzechowski; September 8, 1947; Cleveland, Ohio, U.S.
- Died: October 3, 2000 (aged 53) Atlanta, Georgia, U.S.
- Genres: New wave; power pop; pop rock; electronic rock
- Occupations: Musician; singer; songwriter
- Instruments: Vocals; bass guitar; guitar; keyboards
- Years active: 1964–2000
- Label: Elektra
- Formerly of: The Cars; The Grasshoppers; Mixed Emotions; ID Nirvana; Milkwood; Leatherwood; Richard and the Rabbits; Cap'n Swing; Voices of Classic Rock; Big People Band

Benjamin Orr (né Orzechowski, September 8, 1947 – October 3, 2000) was an American musician. He was best known as the bassist, co-lead vocalist, and co-founder of the band the Cars. He sang lead vocals on several of their hits, including "Just What I Needed", "Let's Go", "Moving in Stereo", and "Drive". He also had the solo hit "Stay the Night".

Orr was posthumously inducted into the Rock and Roll Hall of Fame as a member of the Cars in 2018.

== Early life ==
Benjamin Orzechowski was born in Lakewood, Ohio, to immigrant parents. His mother, Elizabeth (née Alžbeta Benová), was Carpatho-Rusyn, born in present-day Kojšov, Slovakia, and his father, Charles Orzechowski, was of Polish origin, born in what is now present-day Ukraine. Both were devout Byzantine Rite Catholics and Ben's mother would not allow him to drive his first car until the local clergy had blessed it. His family enthusiastically supported his musical endeavors. He became proficient in several instruments, including the guitar, bass guitar, keyboards, and drums.

Known locally as "Benny 11 Letters", he grew up in Lakewood, Ohio, and Parma, Ohio and attended Valley Forge High School before joining local band the Grasshoppers in 1964.

== Career ==
=== The Grasshoppers: 1964–1965 ===
Formed in Cleveland, Ohio, the Grasshoppers were an instrumental-based foursome. Their featured band members were Louis Pratile (lead guitar), Jerry Zadar (bass guitar), and Sid Turner (drummer). They were joined by the then-17-year-old Orzechowski, who became their lead vocalist, rhythm guitarist, and sometimes doubled as a drummer.

"Pink Champagne (and Red Roses)"

In 1965, the Grasshoppers released two singles on the Sunburst label: "Mod Socks" and "Pink Champagne (and Red Roses)", the latter written by Orzechowski.

The Grasshoppers (and later the Mixed Emotions) were also the house band on the Big 5 Show, more commonly known as Upbeat, a musical variety television show produced by WEWS-TV in Cleveland.

=== Mixed Emotions: 1966 ===
The Grasshoppers dissolved in 1966 when two of the band members were drafted into the U.S. Army. Orzechowski then played in the band Mixed Emotions, which featured Joe Kurelic (drummer), Chris Kamburoff (rhythm guitar), David Gardina (bass guitar), and Jimmy Vince with Orzechowski (lead guitar) as lead vocalists. The band recorded three unreleased tracks: "Forever You Have My Heart", "I'll Do My Cryin' in the Rain" and "I Can't Help It".

He later joined another band, the Colours. Eventually Orzechowski was drafted as well, although he received a deferment after approximately a year and a half in the Army.

=== Various groups: ID Nirvana, Leatherwood ===
Orr first met Ric Ocasek in Cleveland in the mid-1960s, after Ocasek saw Orr performing with the Grasshoppers on the Big 5 Show. A few years later, Orr moved to Columbus, Ohio, where he and Ocasek formed a musical partnership that would continue in various incarnations (until the break-up of the Cars in 1988). In the late 1960s, they formed the bands ID Nirvana and Leatherwood, performing in and around Ohio State University (OSU).

=== Milkwood: 1970–1972 ===
In the early 1970s, after moving to Boston, Massachusetts, the two musicians formed the folk rock trio Milkwood with guitarist Jim Goodkind. The group was named after the Dylan Thomas verse play Under Milk Wood (1954). In 1972, the group released one studio album, How's the Weather? under Paramount Records which failed to chart. From the list of songs on the album, Orr wrote "Lincoln Park".

=== Various groups: Ocasek & Orr, Richard and the Rabbits ===
Remaining in Boston, the duo Ocasek and Orr then formed another band, Richard and the Rabbits, featuring keyboardist Greg Hawkes.

=== Cap'n Swing: 1975–1976 ===
This was followed by another Ocasek and Orr band, Cap'n Swing, "an almost famous band". The additional band members included guitarist Elliot Easton, Greg Hawkes, Todd Roberto, Danny (Schliftman) Louis, and Glenn Evans.

They would perform songs such as "City Lights", "Jezebel", "Strawberry Moonlight", "Will You Still Love Me Tonight", and "Come Back Down". A few of these songs would make an appearance in the early days of the Cars, in 1977. In later years, there was a CD released labeled the Jezebel album, which contained demos.

After the group broke up in 1976, Orr, Ocasek, Hawkes, Easton and drummer David Robinson formed the Cars.

=== The Cars: 1977–1988 ===
Orr performing with the Cars on The Midnight Special in 1979

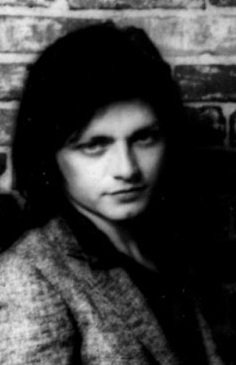
Orr in 1980

As a member of the Cars, Orr sang lead vocals on some of the band's best-known songs, including their first hit in the top 40, "Just What I Needed", "Let's Go", and "Drive", their highest-charting single in the United States.

Orr's work with the Cars spanned 11 years and six studio albums culminating with Door to Door (1987), before the group disbanded in 1988. Afterwards, he and the other members pursued solo work.

=== Solo career ===
Orr released his debut and sole studio album, The Lace, in 1986. He cowrote the music and lyrics with his long-time girlfriend Diane Grey Page, who also sang backing vocals and appeared on the album's back cover.

The album featured a top-40 pop and top-10 album rock hit, "Stay the Night". An accompanying music video for the song was played in heavy rotation on MTV. A second single, "Too Hot to Stop", was also released, but did not chart on the U.S. Billboard Hot 100, although it reached No. 25 on the album rock chart.

In the late 1980s, Orr worked with Joni Mitchell's then-husband Larry Klein, who coproduced The Lace. Orr provided backing vocals for "Number One" and "The Beat of Black Wings" for Mitchell's thirteenth studio album Chalk Mark in a Rain Storm (1988).

In the mid-1990s, Orr recorded tracks with guitarist John Kalishes for an unreleased follow-up studio album to The Lace, including a rendition of Stan Meissner's "River of Fire". Although the album was never officially released, multiple tracks exist.

=== Various groups: ORR Band, Voices of Classic Rock, Big People ===
From 1998 until his death in 2000, Orr performed with his own band ORR and two side bands, Voices of Classic Rock with Mickey Thomas and John Cafferty, and cover band Big People with Pat Travers, Jeff Carlisi (of 38 Special), Derek St. Holmes (of Ted Nugent's backing band) and Liberty DeVitto (of Billy Joel's backing band).

== Personal life ==
Orr was married twice and had one son.

=== Illness and death ===
In April 2000, Orr was diagnosed with pancreatic cancer and hospitalized. However, he continued to perform with the band Big People throughout that summer at music festivals and state fairs. He reunited with the Cars one last time in Atlanta for an interview that was included in the Rhino Records concert video The Cars Live.

Orr died from the disease at his home in Atlanta on October 3, 2000, at the age of 53. He had made his final public appearance on September 27, performing with Big People in Alaska. Bandmates Jeff Carlisi, Derek St. Holmes and Rob Wilson were at Orr's bedside when he died.

Ric Ocasek wrote and recorded the song "Silver" as a musical tribute to Orr. It appeared on Ocasek's seventh and final solo studio album Nexterday (2005). The Cars reunited ten years after Orr's death and released their seventh and final studio album, Move Like This, in May 2011. Orr was given special thanks in the liner notes: "Ben, your spirit was with us on this one."

== Discography ==
=== Solo albums ===
- The Lace (1986) – US No. 86

=== With the Grasshoppers ===
- "Mod Socks" b/w "Twin Beat" (1965) Sunburst Records
- "Pink Champagne (and Red Roses)" b/w "The Wasp" (1965) Sunburst Records

=== With Milkwood ===
- How's the Weather? (1973)

=== With the Cars ===
- The Cars (1978)
- Candy-O (1979)
- Panorama (1980)
- Shake It Up (1981)
- Heartbeat City (1984)
- Door to Door (1987)

=== Participation ===
- 1988 : Chalk Mark in a Rain Storm by Joni Mitchell – backing vocals on two songs

=== Solo singles ===
Title	Release	Peak chart positions					Album
Title	Release	US	US Rock	US AC	AUS	CAN	Album
"Stay the Night"	1986	24	6	2	66	31	The Lace
"Too Hot to Stop"	1987	—	25	—	—	—	The Lace
"—" denotes a recording that did not chart.

=== Orr lead vocals: The Cars ===
- * = shared with Ric Ocasek

Title	Release	Album
"Just What I Needed"	1978	The Cars
"Bye Bye Love"	1978	The Cars
"Moving in Stereo"	1978	The Cars
"All Mixed Up"	1978	The Cars
"Let's Go"	1979	Candy-O
"Since I Held You"*	1979	Candy-O
"It's All I Can Do"	1979	Candy-O
"Candy-O"	1979	Candy-O
"You Can't Hold On Too Long"	1979	Candy-O
"Don't Tell Me No"	1980	Panorama
"Down Boys"	1980	Panorama
"You Wear Those Eyes"*	1980	Panorama
"Running to You"	1980	Panorama
"Cruiser"	1981	Shake It Up
"This Could Be Love"	1981	Shake It Up
"Think It Over"	1981	Shake It Up
"Drive"	1984	Heartbeat City
"Stranger Eyes"	1984	Heartbeat City
"It's Not the Night"*	1984	Heartbeat City
"You Are the Girl"*	1987	Door to Door
"Double Trouble"	1987	Door to Door
"Everything You Say"	1987	Door to Door
"Coming Up You"	1987	Door to Door
"Go Away"	1987	Door to Door
