= Battery Studios =

Recording studio in London, England

Coordinates: 51°32′48″N 0°14′02″W

- Formerly: Morgan Studios
- Type: Recording studio
- Industry: Music
- Founded: 1980; 46 years ago in Willesden, London, England
- Headquarters: London, England

Battery Studios is an independent recording studio complex in Willesden in northwest London originally established in 1980 when Zomba Group acquired Morgan Studios 3 and 4. The studios were later ran by Flood and Alan Moulder branded as Assault & Battery Studios. In 2021 the original name was resumed with a partnership between Miloco Studios, Flood, and Moulder.

As of 2026, despite its non-designated heritage asset status, the studios face potential demolition due to the landowner's intention to redevelop the site, sparking significant industry outcry with a petition to save the studio being launched.

== History ==
=== Zomba Group Era (1980–2001) ===
Jay-Z standing outside Battery Studios in the late 1980s during his visit to London with Jaz-O.

Originally established in the early 1970s as Morgan Studio 3 and 4, the studios were purchased in 1980 by Zomba Group and re-named Battery Studios, initially catering to Jive and Zomba artists, but later also open to outside projects. Battery Studios in London featured a 32-track Mitsubishi recorder and Fairlight CMI sampling synthesizer workstations, and was the first of what would eventually become multiple Battery Recording Studios facilities operated by Zomba in London, New York City, Nashville, and Chicago. The new owners hired a team of "in-house producers" which included Robert John "Mutt" Lange, Martin Birch, Tony Platt, Chris Tsangarides and Nigel Green. Birch recorded such albums as Iron Maiden's Killers (1981), and The Number of the Beast (1982), as well as portions of Whitesnake's Saints & Sinners (1982) at the studio. Platt recorded Krokus' One Vice at a Time (1982). Lange recorded such notable albums as Def Leppard's High 'n' Dry (1981) and Pyromania (1982), as well as The Cars 1984 hit album Heartbeat City at the studio. Other albums recorded at Battery Studios in the 1980s include A Flock of Seagulls eponymous debut album, Whodini's self-titled album, Joan Armatrading's Secret Secrets (1985), Talk Talk's The Colour of Spring (1986), and The Stone Roses' debut studio album.

In 1984, Billy Ocean recorded his international breakthrough album Suddenly at Battery for Zomba subsidiary Jive Records. Ocean would return to the studios to record "When the Going Gets Tough, the Tough Get Going" hit song from The Jewel of the Nile Soundtrack, Love Zone (1986), and Tear Down These Walls (1988).

In 1991 Bryan Adams worked with Mutt Lange at the studio to produce Waking Up the Neighbours, and the following year The Tragically Hip worked with Chris Tsangarides to produce Fully Completely.

In 2001, Zomba Group announced withdrawal from the recording business in the United Kingdom, citing the growth of project studios and decreased demand from record labels for commercial studio services.

=== Assault & Battery (2005–2020) ===
In 2005, Flood and Alan Moulder purchased the former Morgan Studio 4, which they re-named Assault & Battery 1, outfitting it with a 72-channel Solid State Logic SL 4000 G+ acquired from Trent Reznor that had previously been in use at his New Orleans recording studio, as well as retaining the three EMT 140 plate reverbs originally installed by Morgan. Three years later, they purchased the former Morgan Studio 3, which they re-named Assault & Battery 2, and outfitted with a 60-channel Neve VR recording console.

In 2012, Foals recorded Holy Fire at the studio with Flood, Moulder, and engineer Catherine Marks.

In 2019, Studio 2 was refurbished and equipped with the Cadac recording console used by Radiohead to record OK Computer.

=== Return To Battery Studios (2021–Present) ===
From 2021 to late 2025 Miloco managed, staffed, and sublet studios within the building, alongside Flood and Alan Moulder. Other engineers and producers working independently within the complex included Alessio Garavello, Andy Bradfield, Caesar Edmunds, David Emery, and Stephen Lipson.

Notable artists working from the studios during this period include Arctic Monkeys, Beabadoobee, Blonde Redhead, Depeche Mode, Duran Duran, Ed Sheeran, Editors, Ian Brown, Kylie Minogue, La Roux, McFly, Mike Skinner, Mr Hudson, Paolo Nutini, PinkPantheress, PJ Harvey, Placebo, Portishead, Royal Blood, Sam Smith, Spandau Ballet, The Killers, and U2.

Leading up to its auction in October 2024, restoration work on the EMI TG12345 MkI was partly undertaken at Battery Studios, on behalf of Mike Hedges and MJQ, a recording studio used equipment broker.

In February 2026, the property developer who owns the studios' freehold submitted a planning application to demolish and redevelop the complex into a mix of commercial units and residential dwellings. Given Battery's notable history and non-designated heritage asset status, this sparked significant industry outcry, garnering support from the Music Producers Guild, with a petition being circulated in April 2026 calling for the studio to be saved. As of November 2026, the outcome of the planning application has yet to be decided.
