= David Robinson (drummer) =

American retired drummer (born 1949)

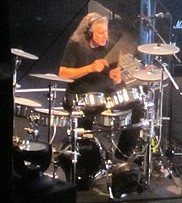
- Robinson performing with the Cars at the Riviera Theatre in Chicago, 2011

Background information
- Born: April 2, 1949 (age 76); Malden, Massachusetts, U.S.
- Genres: Rock; new wave; proto-punk
- Occupation: Drummer
- Years active: 1960s–1987; 2010–2011; 2018
- Label: Elektra
- Formerly of: The Cars; The Modern Lovers; DMZ; The Rising Tide; The Pop!

David Robinson (born April 2, 1949) is an American retired rock drummer. He has performed with many rock bands, including the Rising Tide, the Modern Lovers, the Pop!, DMZ and the Cars. In 2018, Robinson was inducted into the Rock and Roll Hall of Fame as a member of the Cars. To date, Robinson is also the only member of the Cars to not release a solo album.

== Background ==
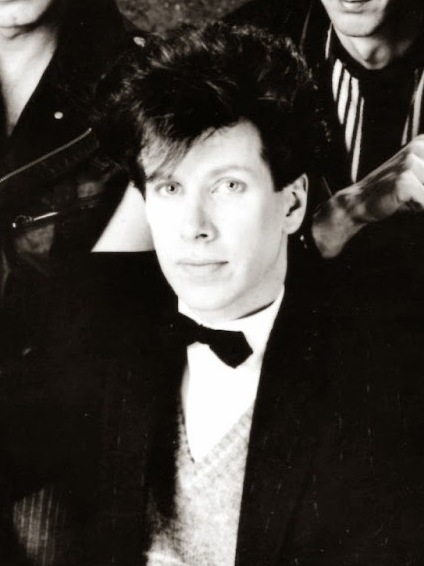
Robinson in 1984

Born in Malden, Massachusetts, Robinson attended Woburn Memorial High School. From 1970 to 1973, he was a member of the Modern Lovers. Robinson co-formed the Cars in 1976, and came up with the Cars' band name and is credited with designing their album covers. Robinson was the only member of the Cars who was a Massachusetts native and from the Boston area. He was a member of DMZ when he left to form the Cars. After the breakup of the Cars, Robinson retired from the music industry and ran a restaurant. He was an extra in several films, including Housesitter (1992) and The Crucible (1996). In 2010, Robinson reunited with the surviving original members of the Cars to record their first studio album in 24 years, titled Move Like This (2011). He had to relearn how to play the drums since (aside from loose jamming on the congas) he had stopped playing in 1987. After the completion of Move Like This, Robinson said that he would be interested in working on more studio albums.

As of August 2018, Robinson runs an art gallery in Rockport, Massachusetts, where he sells jewelry that he makes himself. In 2020, Robinson appeared in an episode of Chasing Classic Cars in which his 1969 De Tomaso Mangusta was restored.
