= The Cars =

American rock band

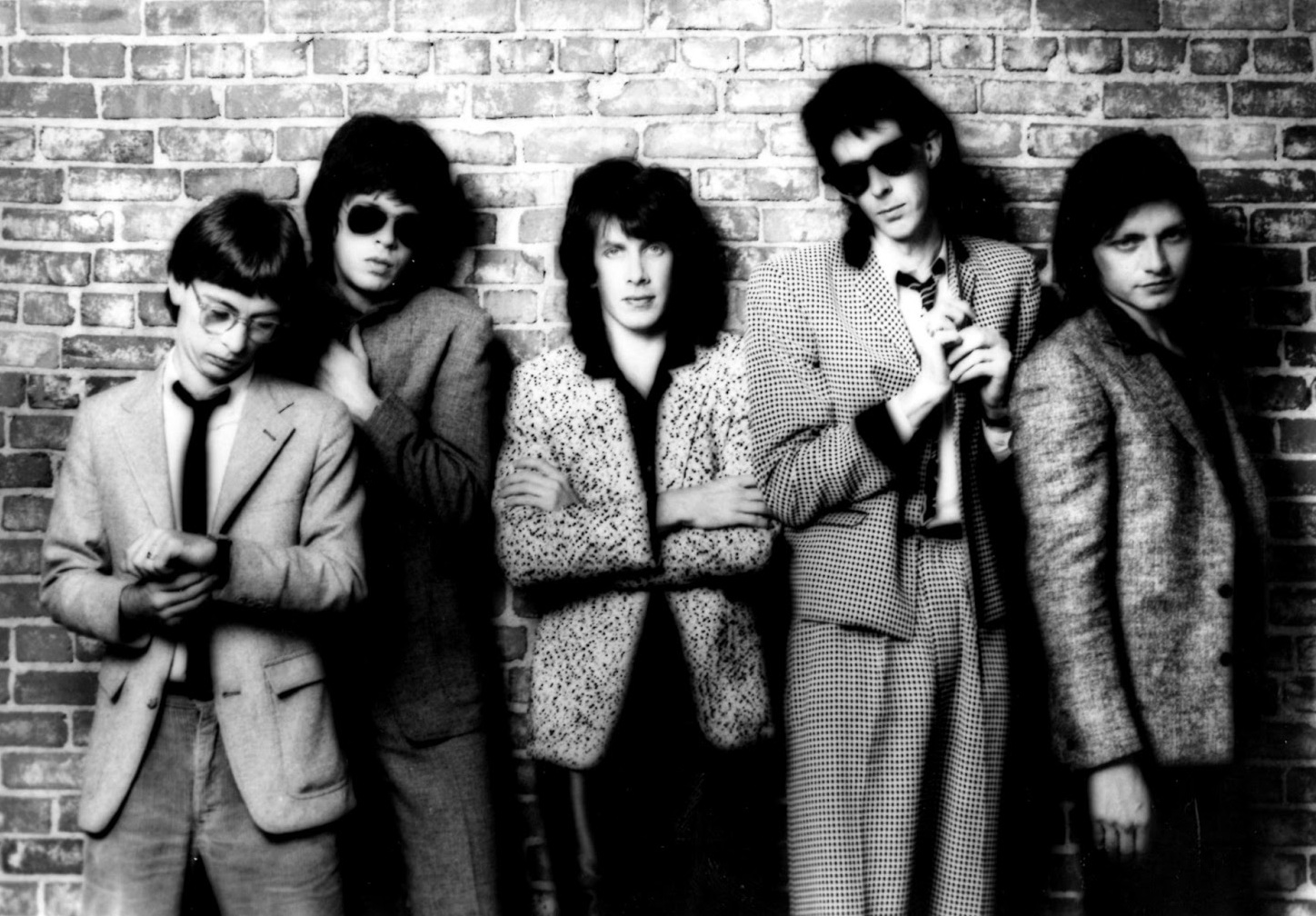
- The Cars c. 1980 (left to right): Greg Hawkes, Elliot Easton, David Robinson, Ric Ocasek & Benjamin Orr

Background information
- Origin: Boston, Massachusetts, U.S.
- Genres: New wave; power pop; pop rock; electronic rock; synth-rock
- Works: Discography
- Years active: 1976–1988; 2010–2011; 2018
- Labels: Elektra; Concord
- Spinoffs: The New Cars
- Spinoff of: Cap'n Swing
- Past members: Ric Ocasek; Benjamin Orr; Elliot Easton; David Robinson; Greg Hawkes
- Website: thecars.org

The Cars were an American rock band formed in Boston in 1976. Emerging from the new wave scene in the late 1970s, they consisted of Ric Ocasek (rhythm guitar), Benjamin Orr (bass guitar), Elliot Easton (lead guitar), Greg Hawkes (keyboards) and David Robinson (drums). Ocasek and Orr shared lead vocals. Ocasek was the band's leader and took sole songwriting credits for practically every song, leading to friction in the band later.

The Cars were at the forefront of the merger of 1970s guitar-oriented rock with the new synthesizer-oriented pop that became popular in the early 1980s. Music critic Robert Palmer of The New York Times and Rolling Stone wrote that the band "...have taken some important but disparate contemporary trends—punk minimalism, the labyrinthine synthesizer and guitar textures of art rock, the '50s rockabilly revival and the melodious terseness of power pop—and mixed them into a personal and appealing blend".

In 1978, the Cars were named "Best New Artist" in a readers' poll conducted by Rolling Stone. The band's 1978 debut album, The Cars, sold six million copies and appeared on the Billboard 200 album chart for 139 weeks. The Cars had four Top 10 hits: "Shake It Up" (1981), "You Might Think" (1984), "Drive" (1984), and "Tonight She Comes" (1985). The band won Video of the Year for "You Might Think" at the first MTV Video Music Awards in 1984.

The Cars disbanded in 1988. During this first hiatus, Orr died of pancreatic cancer in 2000. In 2007, Easton and Hawkes joined Todd Rundgren and others to form the offshoot band the New Cars. The surviving original members of the Cars reunited to record the band's seventh and final album, Move Like This (2011), toured in support of the album, and once again went on hiatus. In April 2018, the Cars were inducted into the Rock and Roll Hall of Fame, and the band reunited to perform at the induction ceremony. This became the band's final performance before Ocasek's death the following year.

== History ==
=== Early years ===
Before forming the Cars, the band's members performed together in several groups. Ric Ocasek and Benjamin Orr met in Cleveland, Ohio, in the 1960s after Ocasek saw Orr performing with his band, the Grasshoppers, on The Big 5 Show, a local musical variety program. The two were members of various bands in Columbus, Ohio, and Ann Arbor, Michigan, before moving to Boston in the early 1970s. In Boston, Ocasek and Orr, along with lead guitarist Jas Goodkind, formed a Crosby, Stills and Nash–style folk rock band called Milkwood. In 1972, they released an album titled How's the Weather through Paramount Records that failed to chart.

After this, Milkwood, Ocasek and Orr formed the group Richard and the Rabbits, a name suggested by Jonathan Richman. The band included Greg Hawkes, who had studied at the Berklee School of Music and had played saxophone on Milkwood's album. Hawkes left to tour with Martin Mull and His Fabulous Furniture, a musical comedy act in which Mull played a variety of instruments. Ocasek and Orr then performed as an acoustic duo called Ocasek and Orr at the Idler Coffeehouse in Cambridge, Massachusetts. Some of the songs they played became early Cars songs.

Ocasek and Orr later teamed with guitarist Elliot Easton (who had also studied at Berklee) in the band Cap'n Swing. The band also featured drummer Glenn Evans, later followed by Kevin Robichaud, Danny Schliftman on keyboard, and Todd Roberto on bass, whose jazzy playing clashed with Ocasek's preference for a rock-and-roll sound. Orr was the lead vocalist and did not play an instrument. Cap'n Swing soon came to the attention of WBCN disc jockey Maxanne Sartori, who began playing songs from their demo tape on her show.

After being rejected by several record labels, Ocasek fired the bass player, keyboardist, and drummer and resolved to form a band better fitting his style of writing. Orr took bass guitar, and Robichaud was replaced by David Robinson, best known for his career with the Modern Lovers and DMZ. Robinson, whose sense of fashion strongly influenced the band's image, suggested the band's new name, the Cars. The band was formed in 1976.

=== Rise in popularity, The Cars, and Candy-O (1976–1979) ===
After a warmup gig in a motel lounge outside of Boston, the Cars played their official first show at Pease Air Force Base in New Hampshire on December 31, 1976. Cap'n Swing's keyboardist Danny Schliftman (later to join Gov't Mule under the name Danny Louis) played with the Cars for their first several gigs until Greg Hawkes was free to join in February 1977.

The Cars spent early 1977 playing throughout New England, developing the songs that appeared on their debut album. A nine-song demo tape was recorded in early 1977 and soon "Just What I Needed" was receiving heavy airplay on Boston radio stations WBCN and WCOZ. The band was offered record deals by Arista Records and Elektra Records and finally signed with famed A&R executive George Daly to Elektra-Asylum, a label with comparatively fewer new-wave acts. The band's debut album The Cars was released in June 1978, reaching No.18 on the Billboard 200. "Just What I Needed" was released as the debut single from the album, followed by "My Best Friend's Girl" and "Good Times Roll", all three charting on the Billboard Hot 100. The album featured multiple album tracks that received substantial airplay such as "You're All I've Got Tonight", "Bye Bye Love" and "Moving in Stereo".

The band's second album, Candy-O, was released in June 1979 and eclipsed the success of The Cars, peaking at No. 3 on the Billboard 200 album chart, 15 spots higher than the debut album. Featuring a cover created by the famed Playboy artist Alberto Vargas, the album featured the band's first top-20 single "Let's Go". Singles "It's All I Can Do" and "Double Life" were also released, but with less success.

=== Change in sound, Panorama and Shake It Up (1980–1982) ===
Following the success of Candy-O, the band's third studio album Panorama was released in August 1980. The album was considered more experimental than its predecessors and featured only one top-40 hit, "Touch and Go". Although the album peaked at No. 5 in the U.S., it did not receive the critical praise of The Cars and Candy-O, with Rolling Stone describing the album as "an out-and-out drag."

In 1981 the Cars purchased Intermedia Studios in Boston, renaming it Syncro Sound. The only Cars album recorded there was the band's fourth album Shake It Up, a more commercial album than Panorama. It was the band's first album to spawn a top-10 single with the title track, and it included another hit in "Since You're Gone".

Following their 1982 tour, the Cars took a two-year break and the members worked on solo projects, with Ocasek and Hawkes both releasing debut albums (Beatitude and Niagara Falls, respectively).

=== Heartbeat City, Door to Door, superstardom, and first hiatus (1984–1988) ===
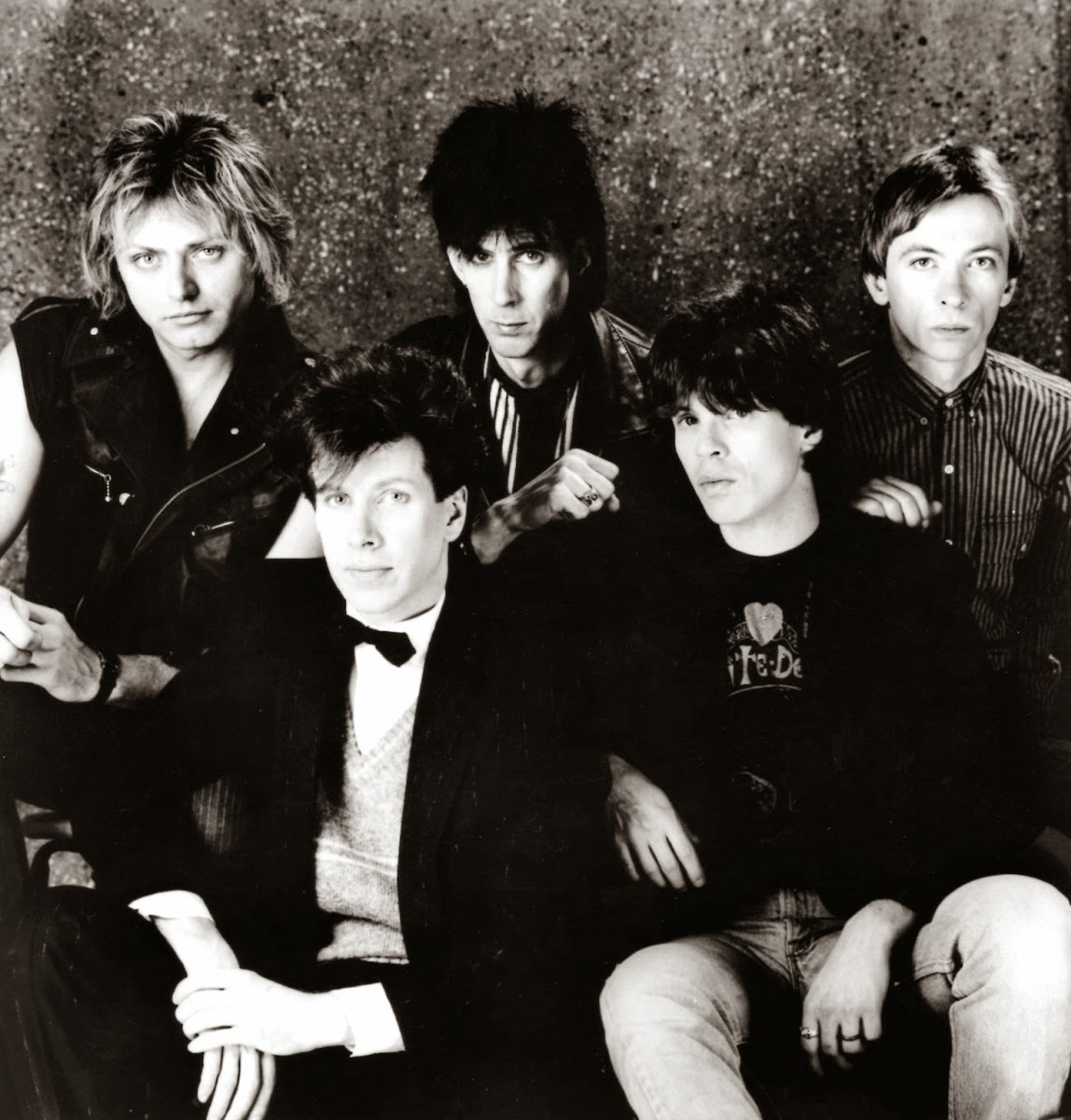
The Cars in a 1984 publicity shot

The Cars reunited and released their most successful album, Heartbeat City, in March 1984. The first single, "You Might Think", helped the Cars win Video of the Year at the first MTV Video Music Awards. Other hit singles from the album included "Magic", "Hello Again" and "Why Can't I Have You". "Drive", with Orr on lead vocals, gained notoriety when it was used in a video about the Ethiopian famine shown at the 1985 Live Aid concert at Wembley Stadium in London, although the Cars performed at the Live Aid concert in Philadelphia. The song became the band's most successful single, reaching No. 3 on the Billboard Hot 100. Actor/director Timothy Hutton directed the song's music video.

The band's 1985 Greatest Hits compilation included another hit single, "Tonight She Comes", which peaked at No. 7 hit on the Billboard Hot 100 and No. 1 on the Billboard Top Rock Tracks chart.

After solo projects from Easton, Ocasek and Orr and a film score by Hawkes, the Cars reunited in 1987 for their sixth album, Door to Door. It contained two old tracks from their club days, "Leave or Stay" and "Ta Ta Wayo Wayo", and produced their last major international hit "You Are the Girl". The album failed to approach the success of their previous albums, and the group announced their breakup in February 1988.

=== Orr's death and "The New Cars", 2000–2008 ===
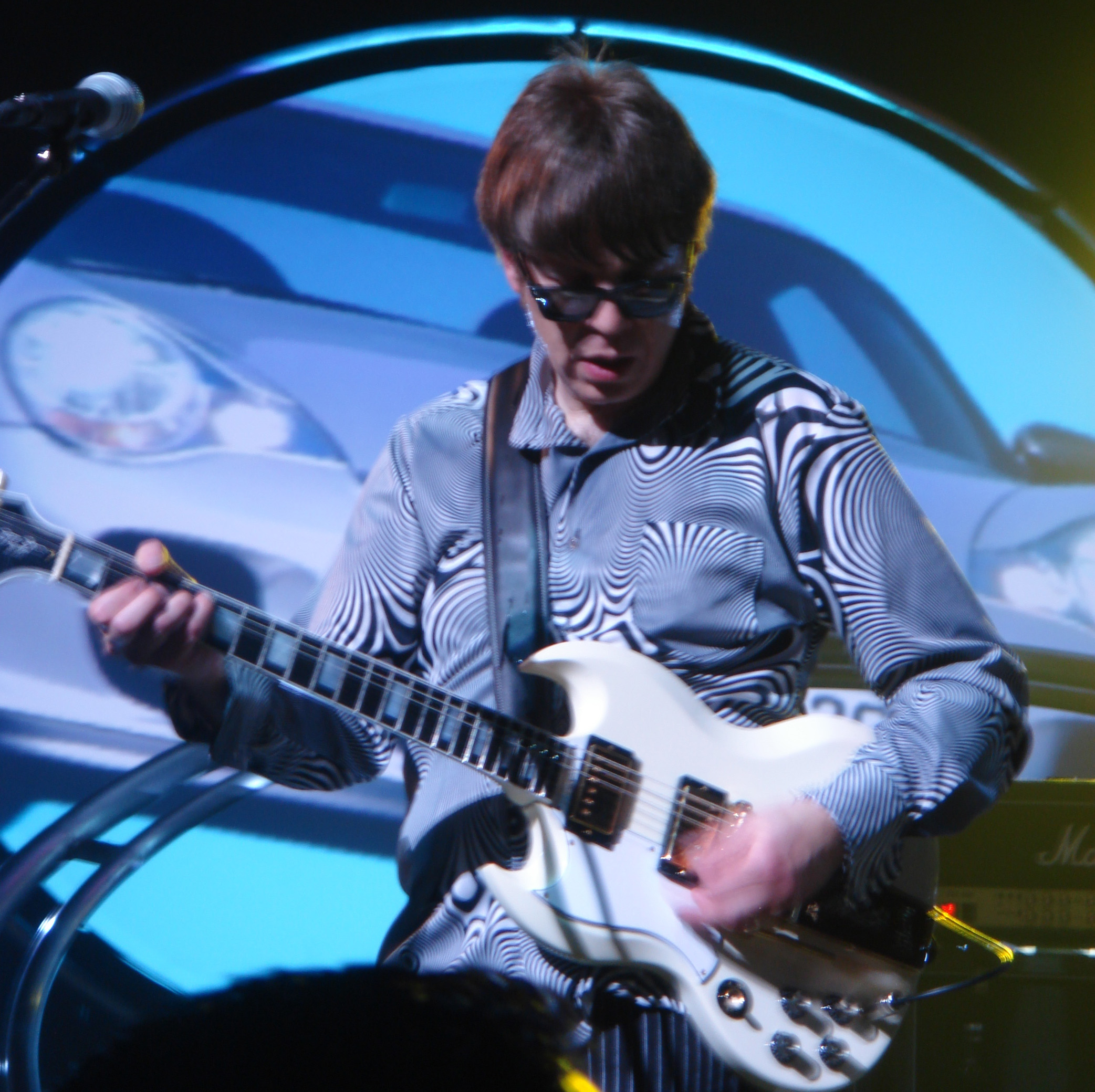
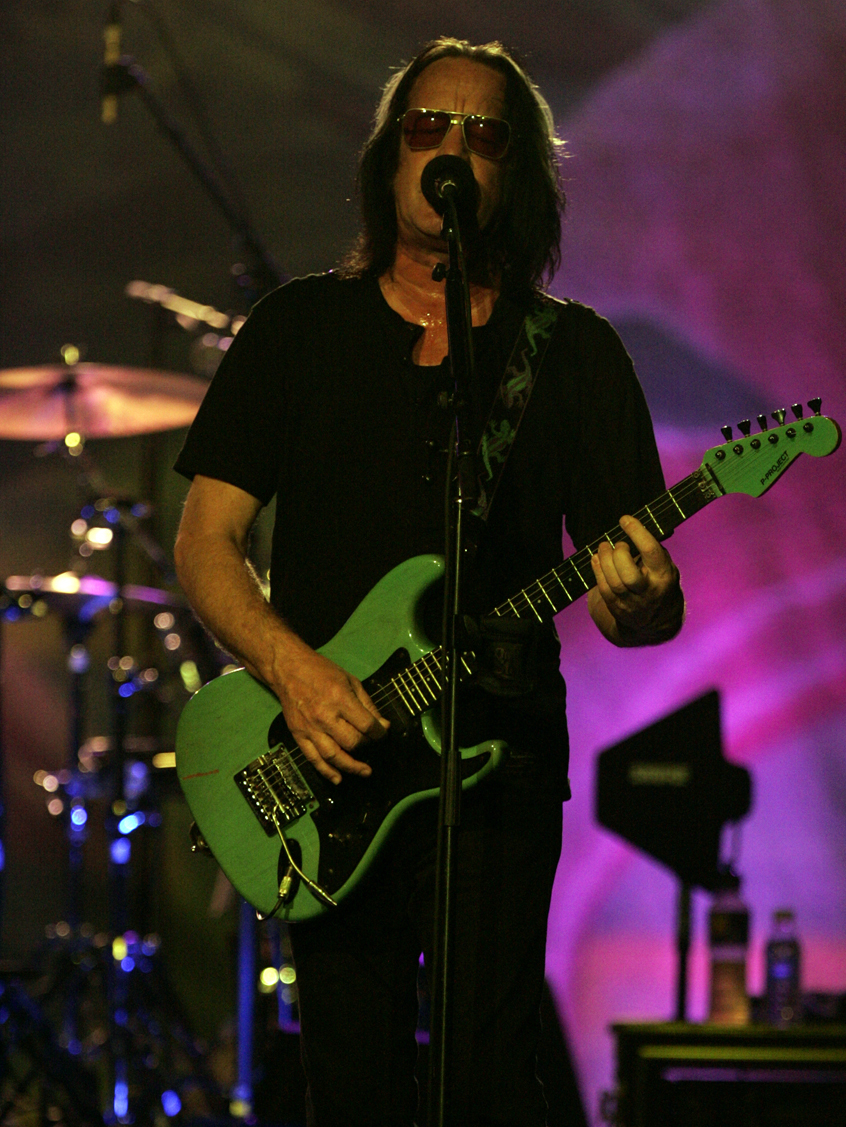
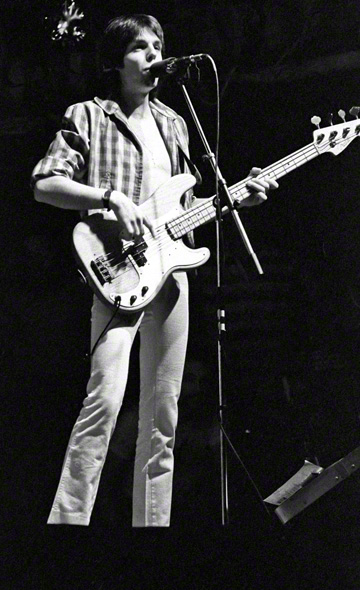
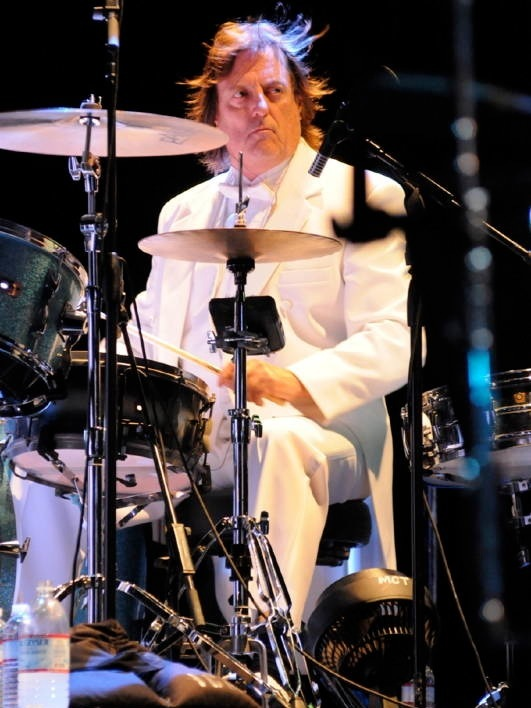
In 2005, guitarist Elliot Easton (left, pictured performing with the band) formed the New Cars with Greg Hawkes and added Todd Rundgren, Kasim Sulton and Prairie Prince to the lineup. The supergroup disbanded after one album and one single. The band also performed songs from Rundgren's career.

In April 2000, Orr was diagnosed with pancreatic cancer and hospitalized. He continued to perform with the band Big People throughout that summer at music festivals and state fairs. He reunited with the Cars one last time in Atlanta for an interview that was included in the Rhino Records concert video The Cars Live. He died from the disease at his home in Atlanta on October 3, 2000, at the age of 53.

In late 2005, the Cars were planning to re-form despite Orr's death and lack of interest on the part of Ocasek. A primary motivation for the desire to tour by the other surviving members was due to the fact that all song royalties from their music library went almost exclusively to Ocasek, which left the surviving members cut off from revenue. Rumors followed that Todd Rundgren had joined Easton and Hawkes in rehearsals for a possible new Cars lineup. Initial speculation pointed to the New Cars being fleshed out with Clem Burke of Blondie and Art Alexakis of Everclear. Eventually the group completed their lineup with former Rundgren bassist Kasim Sulton and studio drummer Prairie Prince of the Tubes, who had played on XTC's Rundgren-produced Skylarking and who has recorded and toured with Rundgren.

In early 2006, the new lineup played a few private shows for industry professionals, played live on The Tonight Show with Jay Leno and made other media appearances before commencing a 2006 summer tour with the re-formed Blondie. Rundgren referred to the project as "an opportunity ... for me to pay my bills, play to a larger audience, work with musicians I know and like, and ideally have some fun for a year." The New Cars' first single, "Not Tonight", was released on March 20, 2006. A live album/greatest hits collection, It's Alive!, was released in June 2006. The album includes classic Cars songs and two Rundgren hits recorded live plus three new studio tracks ("Not Tonight", "Warm", and "More")

In 2008, Video game developer Harmonix released the Cars' debut album as Rock Band's second downloadable full album (following Judas Priest's Screaming for Vengeance).

=== Reunion, Move Like This and second hiatus (2010–2017) ===
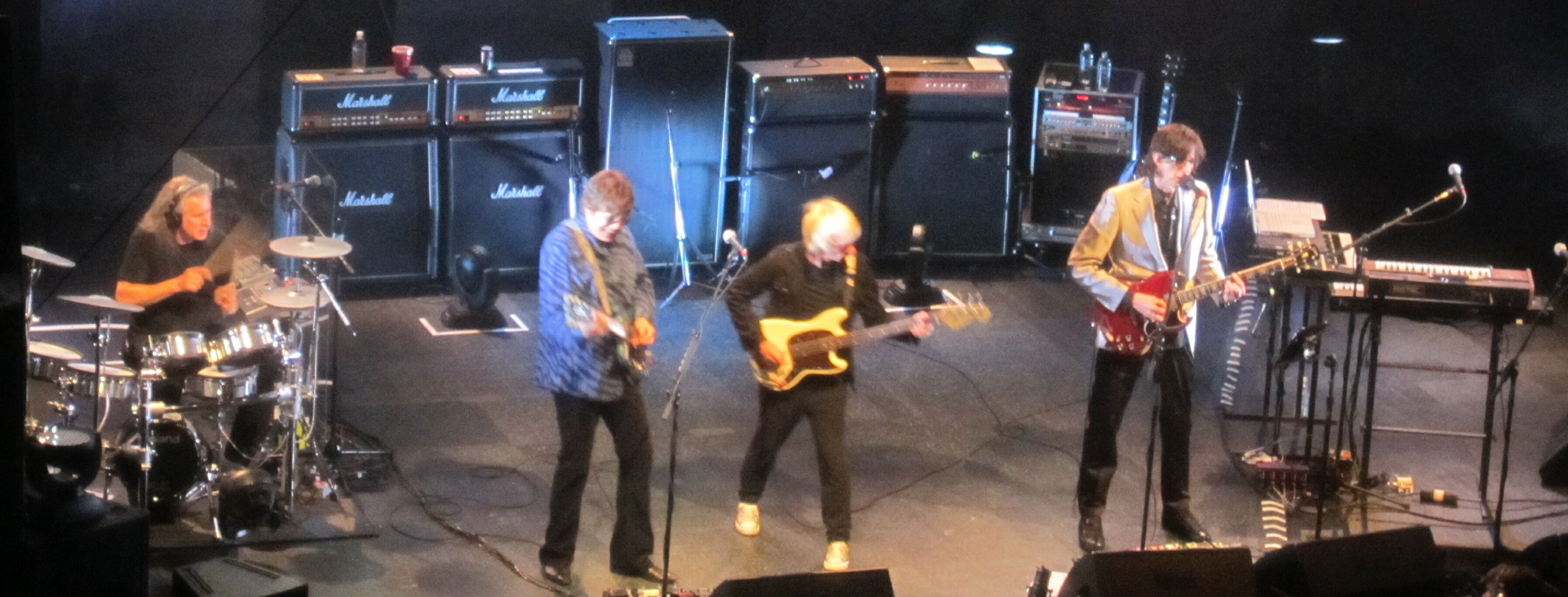
The Cars performing at the Riviera Theatre in May 2011

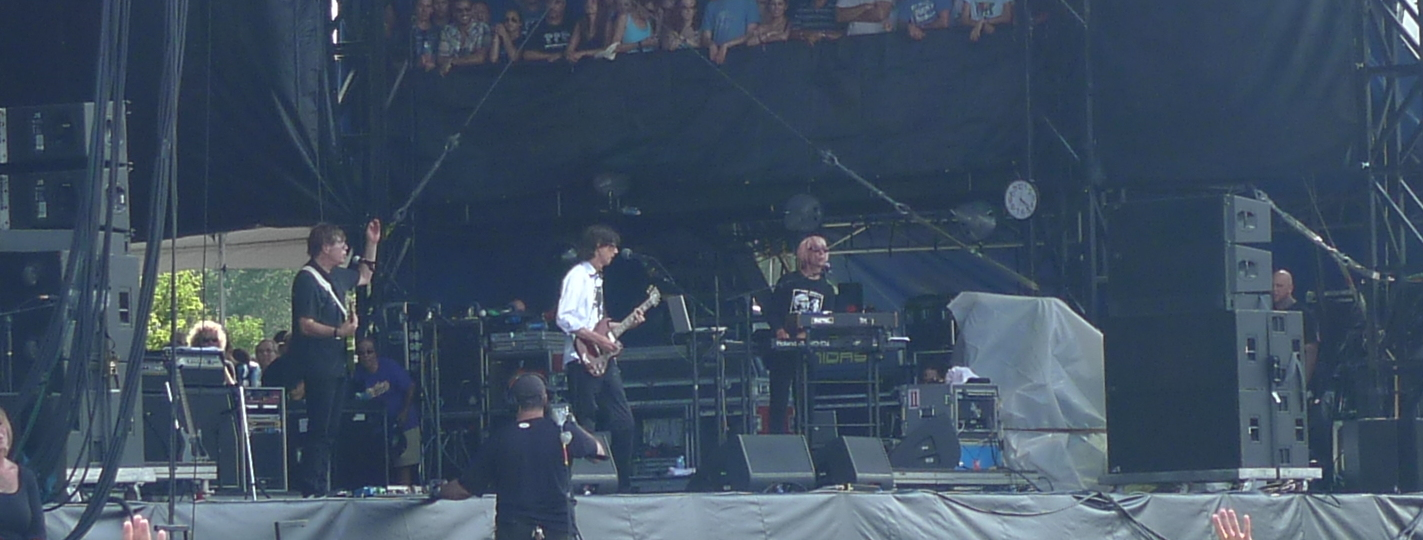
The Cars performing at Lollapalooza in August 2011, the band's final performance until their Rock and Roll Hall of Fame induction ceremony in 2018

In 2010, the surviving founding members of the Cars suggested a reunion when Ocasek, Easton, Hawkes and Robinson placed a photo of the four members together, taken at Millbrook Sound Studios, on their Facebook page. On October 13, they also posted a snippet of a new song titled "Blue Tip". A picture of Jacknife Lee in the studio was posted, hinting that he would produce the new album.

In October, Billboard reported that the Cars were recording a new album at veteran engineer Paul Orofino's studio in Millbrook, New York. A music clip of the new song "Sad Song" was added to the band's Facebook page on December 7, 2010. A clip of a song titled "Free" was shared on January 1, 2011. The official debut video for "Blue Tip" was released on February 17. The video features the members of the band and New York-based street artist Joe Iurato. The surviving Cars agreed to not replace Orr, so Hawkes and Lee handled all of the bass parts.

The new album, Move Like This, was released on May 10 by Hear Music/Concord Music Group, debuting at No. 7 on Billboard's album chart. It featured 10 songs in under 40 minutes. "Sad Song" was released to radio stations on March 1 as the album's first single. In May 2011, the Cars embarked on a ten-city tour of the United States and Canada and also performed at Lollapalooza in Chicago in August. On the tour, Orr's bass parts were performed by Hawkes on keyboard and bass, and the vocals for songs originally sung by Orr ("Just What I Needed", "Let's Go" and "Moving in Stereo") were performed by Ocasek. In an interview, Ocasek was asked whether the band would have reunited if Orr had still been alive, responding: "Ben and I had a real cold war going that lasted about 23 years. I could never really figure out exactly why, but I think there was a lot of jealousy because I wrote the songs and I got a lot of attention. And there was all kinds of weird stuff, like he said, 'My girlfriend writes songs, let's use one of those or two of those.' I said, 'No, that's not the Cars.'"

The Cars once again became inactive after the tour's conclusion in 2011.

=== Rock and Roll Hall of Fame induction and death of Ric Ocasek (2018–2019) ===
After seven years of inactivity, the group reconvened, along with Weezer's Scott Shriner on bass, to play a four-song set at their 2018 induction into the Rock and Roll Hall of Fame. The band played "You Might Think" (which Weezer covered for the Cars 2 soundtrack), "My Best Friend's Girl", "Moving in Stereo" and "Just What I Needed." They were introduced by Killers frontman Brandon Flowers.

On September 15, 2019, Ocasek was found dead of natural causes at his New York home at the age of 75.

== Musical style ==
The Cars' music has been described as new wave, power pop, pop rock and synth-rock, and is influenced by proto-punk, garage rock and bubblegum. They have also used rockabilly in songs such as "My Best Friend's Girl". Critic Robert Palmer wrote that the Cars "have taken some important but disparate contemporary trends—punk minimalism, the labyrinthine synthesizer and guitar textures of art rock, the 1950s rockabilly revival and the melodious terseness of power pop—and mixed them into a personal and appealing blend."

Ocasek took exclusive writing credits for all songs, apart from a few he shared with Hawkes. Easton and other members claimed the songs were a collaborative effort, saying they turned "the skeletal demos" that Ocasek introduced into full songs. Easton and Robinson often pleaded with Ocasek to share song credits, but he refused, stating that the Cars were "his band".

=== Legacy ===
The Cars bridged late-1970s guitar rock and early-1980s synth-pop, laying the groundwork for new wave and power pop. Robert Palmer credited them with combining punk minimalism, art rock textures, rockabilly, and power pop hooks. Having sold over 23 million albums in the U.S., they were inducted into the Rock and Roll Hall of Fame in 2018.

The band influenced numerous alternative and rock acts, including Nirvana, Weezer, The Smashing Pumpkins, Fountains of Wayne, No Doubt, The Strokes, and The Killers. Kurt Cobain counted them as a core influence and Nirvana covered "My Best Friend's Girl" in 1994, while the Smashing Pumpkins covered "You're All I've Got Tonight" in 1995. Frontman Ric Ocasek became a prominent producer, helming albums for Weezer (including their 1994 debut), No Doubt, Guided by Voices, Nada Surf, and Bad Religion. Fountains of Wayne co-founder Adam Schlesinger also cited their 1978 debut as a blueprint for hits like "Stacy's Mom".

== Band members ==
- Ric Ocasek – lead and backing vocals, rhythm guitar (1976–1988, 2010–2011, 2018; died 2019)
- Benjamin Orr – lead and backing vocals, bass guitar (1976–1988, died 2000)
- Elliot Easton – lead guitar, backing vocals (1976–1988, 2010–2011, 2018)
- David Robinson – drums, percussion, backing vocals (1976–1988, 2010–2011, 2018), keyboards (1983–1984)
- Greg Hawkes – keyboards, backing vocals (1977–1988, 2010–2011, 2018), saxophone, percussion (1977–1980), rhythm guitar (1977-1979, 2010-2011), bass guitar (2010–2011)

=== Touring/session members ===
- Danny Louis Schliftman – keyboards (1976–1977)
- Scott Shriner – bass guitar, backing vocals (2018)

== Discography ==
- The Cars (1978)
- Candy-O (1979)
- Panorama (1980)
- Shake It Up (1981)
- Heartbeat City (1984)
- Door to Door (1987)
- Move Like This (2011)
