= The Red Hearts =

American garage punk band

- Origin: Los Angeles, California, United States
- Genres: Garage punk, power pop, punk rock, garage rock
- Instruments: vocals, Guitar, Bass, drums, Farfisa Organ
- Years active: 2004 — Present
- Labels: Mean Buzz Records; April 77 Records
- Members: Lenny Pops (Vocals, Guitar); Daniel Clodfelter (Bass, Vocals); Dan Collins (Farfisa, Vocals); Kirk Podell (Drums)
- Past members: Heathur Suvial; Nina Cole; Richie Cardenas; Eric Tretbar; Justino Polimeni

The Red Hearts are an American garage punk band from Los Angeles, California, United States.

== History ==
The Red Hearts, initially called The Thieves, were formed by Lenny Pops in 2004 after the breakup of The Snakes. Pops' framed the band as a minimal mod/punk three piece backed by Nina Cole and Hethur Suval. He changed the band's name to The Red Hearts. The band played many local shows around Los Angeles and Long Beach, and made it as far north as San Francisco in the first few years of its existence. In mid-2006, The Red Hearts were approached by Matt Friction of The Pink Spiders to be one of the first singles distributed by his new Mean Buzz Records label.

Shortly before the release of the Mean Buzz single, both Cole and Suval left the band. Pops decided to continue the band and recruited Richie Cardenas on drums and Daniel Clodfelter on bass. To add an extra dynamic to the new lineup, Pops also got Dan Collins of The Shakes to join the band full-time (he contributed Farfisa to the Mean Buzz single) on Farfisa organ. With the new line-up, The Red Hearts developed a faster, more raw sound and energetic live show. In November 2006, Cardenas left the band to play in the Portland, Oregon based, Clorox Girls. Following Cardenas' departure the Red Hearts went through a series of drummers, including Eric Tretbar, ex-Rat Bastards (pre-Devil Dogs) and Funseekers; and Justino Polimeni, who had previously backed Arthur Lee and Sky Saxon. Kirk Podell is the band's current drummer.

After Podell joined the band, The Red Hearts embarked on a tour of the Southern States traveling as far east as Atlanta, Georgia in September 2007.

The band released a new single, "Let's Get Lost" on the French label, April 77 Records, in April 2008.

== Past projects ==
Pops is a former member of the Brian Jonestown Massacre, and also played with Blake Miller of Moving Units in a band called Spectacle (which toured with the BJM).

Pops' previous band, The Snakes, released one album on The Committee to Keep Music Evil, a subsidiary of Bomp! Records, run by Anton Newcombe of the Brian Jonestown Massacre, in 2002.

Pops was also a member of a recent version of 1980s garage revival band The Morlocks, though he quit after the band's first European tour in 2007.

== Band members ==
- Lenny Pops - Vocals, Guitar (2004–present)
- Daniel Clodfelter - Bass, Vocals (2006–present)
- Dan Collins - Farfisa Organ, Vocals (2006–present)
- Kirk Podell - Drums (2007–present)
  - Hethur Suval - Bass (2004–2006)
  - Nina Cole - Drums (2004–2006)
  - Richie Cardenas - Drums (2006)
  - Eric Tretbar - Drums (2007)
  - Justino Polimeni - Drums (2007)

== Discography ==
=== Singles ===
- "More and Faster" b/w "Synths and Tranqs" 7" - 2006 (Mean Buzz Records)
- "Let's Get Lost" b/w "Big Ripoff" 7" - 2008 (April 77 Records)
