= Troublizing =

Studio album by Ric Ocasek
- Released: September 9, 1997
- Studios: Electric Lady, One Take and Chung King (New York City, New York)
- Genre: New wave
- Length: 43:19
- Label: Columbia
- Producers: Billy Corgan; Ric Ocasek

Ric Ocasek chronology
Getchertikitz (1996)	Troublizing (1997)	Nexterday (2005)

Professional ratings
Review scores
Source	Rating
AllMusic	4/5 stars
The Encyclopedia of Popular Music	2/5 stars
Entertainment Weekly	B−
MusicHound Rock: The Essential Album Guide	3/5 stars
Pitchfork	3.9/10
Rolling Stone	3.5/5 stars

Troublizing is the sixth studio album by American musician Ric Ocasek, released in 1997.

== Production ==
The album was produced in part by Billy Corgan. Melissa Auf der Maur contributed backing vocals and bass. It was recorded at Electric Lady Studios.

== Critical reception ==
AllMusic reviewer Stephen Thomas Erlewine called Troublizing Ocasek's "best solo album since This Side of Paradise." The A.V. Club called it "a vital album that recalls the driving rock of Ocasek's much-loved former group while sounding fresher than many acts currently being passed off as cutting-edge."

The Sun Sentinel wrote that "Ocasek's music is as lean, gangly and oddly interesting as he is." The Baltimore Sun wrote that "even though the twitchy choruses, edgy textures and defiantly unfunky rhythm arrangements evoke the flat, futuristic sound Ocasek conjured with the Cars, not even the presence of synth ace Greg Hawkes makes Troublizing seem second-hand."

== Track listing ==
All tracks are written by Ric Ocasek, except where indicated. Produced by Ric Ocasek. Tracks 3, 6, 7, 8 & 11 co-produced by Billy Corgan.

No.	Title	Writer(s)	Length
1.	"The Next Right Moment"		4:21
2.	"Hang on Tight"		4:55
3.	"Crashland Consequence"		4:08
4.	"Troublizing"		4:10
5.	"Not Shocked"		3:17
6.	"Situation"		3:48
7.	"Fix on You"		3:01
8.	"People We Know"		3:37
9.	"Here We Go"		4:26
10.	"Society Trance"		4:34
11.	"Asia Minor"	Billy Corgan	3:01
Total length:			43:19

== Personnel ==
Musicians

- Ric Ocasek – vocals, guitars
- Greg Hawkes – keyboards (1, 2, 4, 5, 9)
- Brian Baker – guitars (1, 2, 4, 5, 9, 10)
- Billy Corgan – guitars (1, 3, 6–8, 11), keyboards (3, 6, 8, 11), vocals (3, 6, 8, 11)
- Melissa Auf der Maur – bass (1–7, 9–11), vocals (1–7, 9–11)
- Ira Elliot – drums (1, 4, 5, 9, 10)
- Matt Walker – drums (2, 3, 6–8)

Production and Technical

- Tim Devine – A&R
- Neil Perry – engineer (1–3, 6–8)
- Ron St. Germain – engineer (1, 2, 4, 5, 9, 10)
- Jay Nicholas – assistant engineer (1–3, 6–8)
- John Seymour – assistant engineer (1, 2, 4, 5, 9, 10)
- Brian Sperber – assistant engineer (1, 2, 4, 5, 9, 10)
- Michael Barbiero – mixing
- George Marino – mastering at Sterling Sound (New York, NY)
- Gail Marowitz – art direction, design
- Ric Ocasek – photography
- Elliot Roberts and Frank Gironda for Lookout Management – management
