= Devil and a Prayer =

Studio album by Tyler Braden
- Released: May 16, 2025
- Recorded: 2024
- Genre: Country rock
- Length: 61:00
- Label: Warner Music Nashville
- Producer: Sam Martinez

Singles from Devil and a Prayer
- 1. "Devil You Know" Released: February 2, 2024; 2. "More Than a Prayer" Released: July 19, 2024; 3. "Call Me First / Above the Water" Released: December 6, 2024; 4. "Me or the Dawn / How It Starts" Released: January 17, 2025; 5. "God & Guns N' Roses" Released: February 21, 2025; 6. "To Tell You the Truth" Released: March 21, 2025; 7. "Right on Track" Released: April 18, 2025; 8. "Might Be Dangerous" Released: May 9, 2025

Devil and a Prayer is the debut studio album by American country music singer-songwriter Tyler Braden. It was produced by Sam Martinez and released on May 16, 2025, via Warner Music Nashville. The album includes singles "Devil You Know", "More Than a Prayer", "Call Me First", "Above the Water", "Me or the Dawn", "How It Starts", "God & Guns N' Roses", "To Tell You the Truth", "Right on Track", and "Might Be Dangerous". Braden co-wrote thirteen of the nineteen tracks.

== Background ==
The album was announced on February 21, 2025, alongside the release of the single "God & Guns N' Roses". Of the album, Braden stated, “As an artist, it’s exciting to constantly relearn who you are as you grow, and this album is a huge culmination of those moments. The whole process of a debut album has taught me so much about myself and I’m stoked for everyone to experience who I’ve become. Front to back, it’s where I’ve been and it’s the direction I’m headed. I built it like a set list, consistently keeping the live aspect in mind, so check it out and then come see it in person!”

Discussing the genesis of the project, Braden explained that the inspiration for the album was “spread out over years” and that the concept only came together once he started putting the tracklist together and realized it felt like he was building the setlist for a live show. Braden expressed that he contacted his label, Warner Music Nashville, to tell them he was planning to lean into the live concept, and noted that the album includes an acoustic "b-stage" run of four songs in the middle and that physical copies feature the tracks listed in handwritten text like a setlist, complete with designations like "opening song" and "encore". The title of the album comes from the tracks "Devil You Know" and "More Than a Prayer", which were songs originally planned to be the title tracks of two separate extended plays before gaining traction on social media, with Braden noting, “we had these two juxtaposing cover arts, and we just put them together and called it Devil and a Prayer.” On choosing the songs, Braden considered writing "Dear Old Flame" to be a “turning point creatively”, and added that, “even the outside songs had to feel authentic. I didn’t want to feel like an imposter”. He described "Right on Track" as the most personal song on the album, inspired by the ups and downs and self-doubt he experienced while chasing his dream of being a musician.

== Promotion ==
Braden announced his Devil and a Prayer Tour on August 18, 2025. The tour began on January 29, 2026, in Minneapolis. A second leg was announced on October 28.

== Track listing ==
Devil and a Prayer track listing
No.	Title	Writer(s)	Length
1.	"Me or the Dawn"	Tyler Braden; Autumn Buysse; Jake Rose	2:54
2.	"More Than a Prayer"	Devin Dawson; Sam Martinez; Heath Warren	2:44
3.	"Think About Me"	Braden; Melissa Peirce; Adam Wood	3:00
4.	"Above the Water"	Daniel Agee; Braden; Ian Harrison; Sarah Turner	3:02
5.	"You Don't Get to Cry"	Rhett Akins; Braden; Will Bundy	3:21
6.	"Loved Once"	Braden; Daniel Pellarin; Sasha Alex Sloan; Lydia Vaughn	2:52
7.	"How It Starts"	Braden; Luke Niccoli; Vaughn	3:25
8.	"So long"	Braden; Jordan Dozzi; Vaughn	2:54
9.	"To Tell You the Truth"	Braden; Rivers Rutherford; Seth Mosley	3:26
10.	"Bullet in My Boots"	Jaren Johnston; Matt Rogers; Ben Stenson	2:32
11.	"Nothing Looks Good on You"	Braden; Jon Decious; Mikey Reaves	3:44
12.	"Dear Old Flame"	Thomas Archer; Braden	3:34
13.	"Breaking in These Boots"	Braden; Nick Donley; Joey Hyde	2:55
14.	"Evergreen"	Braden; Rob Grimalidi; Austin Nivarel	2:41
15.	"God & Guns N' Roses"	Rian Ball; Braden; Decious	3:36
16.	"Call Me First"	Braden; Zach Dyer; John Robert Hall; Martinez; Cole Miracle	3:21
17.	"Right on Track"	Braden; Decious; Nivarel	3:48
18.	"Might Be Dangerous" (featuring Kaitlin Butts)	Carpenter; Zach Kale; Kyle Sturrock; Warren	3:20
19.	"Devil You Know"	Graham Barham; Dyer; Hall; Martinez	3:12
Total length:			61:00

== Charts ==
Weekly chart performance for Devil and a Prayer
Chart (2025–2026)	Peak position
Australian Country Albums (ARIA)	26
US Top Country Albums (Billboard)	46

== Certifications ==
Certifications for Devil and a Prayer
Region	Certification	Certified units/sales
Canada (Music Canada)	Gold	40,000^{‡}
^{‡} Sales+streaming figures based on certification alone.

== Personnel ==
Credits adapted from Tidal.

- Dan Agee - acoustic guitar, bass, drums, backing vocals, electric guitar, organ, piano, percussion
- Tyler Braden - vocals
- Kaitlin Butts - vocals
- Ben Caver - backing vocals
- Dave Cohen - piano, organ, synthesizer
- Jenee Fleenor - fiddle
- Tim Galloway - acoustic guitar, dobro, electric guitar, resonator guitar, bouzouki
- Mark Hill - bass
- Sam Hunter - acoustic guitar
- Tony Lucido - bass
- Sam Martinez - production, backing vocals, electric guitar, synthesizer
- Mark Mcnelley - electric guitar
- Nir Z - drums, percussion
- Austin Nivarel - acoustic guitar, backing vocals, electric guitar, programming
- Justin Ostrander - electric guitar
- Kyle Pudenz - fiddle
- Justin Schipper - pedal steel
- Aaron Sterling - drums, percussion
- Lydia Vaughn - backing vocals
- Alex Wright - organ, synthesizer, wurlitzer
