= Nexterday =

Studio album by Ric Ocasek
- Released: September 27, 2005
- Studio: Electric Lady and One Take (New York City, New York)
- Genre: New wave
- Length: 40:26
- Label: Sanctuary
- Producer: Ric Ocasek

Ric Ocasek chronology
Troublizing (1997)	Nexterday (2005)

Professional ratings
Review scores
Source	Rating
AllMusic	3.5/5 stars

Nexterday is the seventh and final solo studio album released by former lead singer and songwriter of The Cars, Ric Ocasek.

The album boasts a more DIY sound than previous albums, having been partially recorded in Ocasek's home studio with him playing many of the instruments himself. Musicians featured in his 1982 debut solo album, Beatitude were used on Nexterday, including fellow Cars keyboardist Greg Hawkes, bassist Darryl Jenifer of Bad Brains, drummer/programmer Stephen George and guitarist Roger Greenawalt. "Silver" was Ocasek's musical tribute to Benjamin Orr. "Please Don't Let Me Down" references the title of the album, Nexterday.

== Track listing ==
All tracks are written by Ric Ocasek.

No.	Title	Length
1.	"Crackpot"	3:25
2.	"Bottom Dollar"	3:27
3.	"Don't Lose Me"	3:44
4.	"In a Little Bit"	2:52
5.	"Silver"	4:28
6.	"Come On"	3:35
7.	"I'm Thinking"	3:28
8.	"Carousel"	3:22
9.	"Heard About You"	3:35
10.	"Please Don't Let Me Down"	4:16
11.	"It Gets Crazy"	4:14
Total length:		40:26

== Personnel ==
- Ric Ocasek – vocals, all other instruments
- Greg Hawkes – keyboards (5), acoustic guitar (8)
- Roger Greenawalt – guitars (11)
- Darryl Jenifer – bass
- Stephen George – drum programming (2)
- Rob Joanisse – drums (2, 7)

=== Production ===
- Ric Ocasek – mixing, illustrations
- Stephen George – engineer, mixing
- Iman – engineer
- Jonathan Adler – assistant engineer
- David Heglmeier – assistant engineer
- George Marino – mastering at Sterling Sound (New York, NY)
- Ed Sherman – art direction, design
- Frank Veronsky – photography
