= Hume-Fogg High School =

Coordinates: 36°9′34″N 86°46′54.5″W

Location
- 700 Broadway; Nashville, Tennessee 37203; United States

Information
- Type: Public high school
- School district: Metropolitan Nashville Public Schools
- NCES District ID: 4703180
- Superintendent: Dr. Adrienne Battle
- NCES School ID: 470318001320
- Principal: Erin Caceres
- Staff: 47.75 (on an FTE basis)
- Enrollment: 893 (2023-2024)
- Student to teacher ratio: 18.70
- Colors: Royal blue and white
- Mascot: Knightro the Knight
- Nickname: Blue Knights
- Yearbook: The Echo
- Eponyms: Alfred E. Hume and Francis B. Fogg
- Website: https://humefogg.mnps.org/

- Hume-Fogg Academic Magnet High School
- U.S. National Register of Historic Places
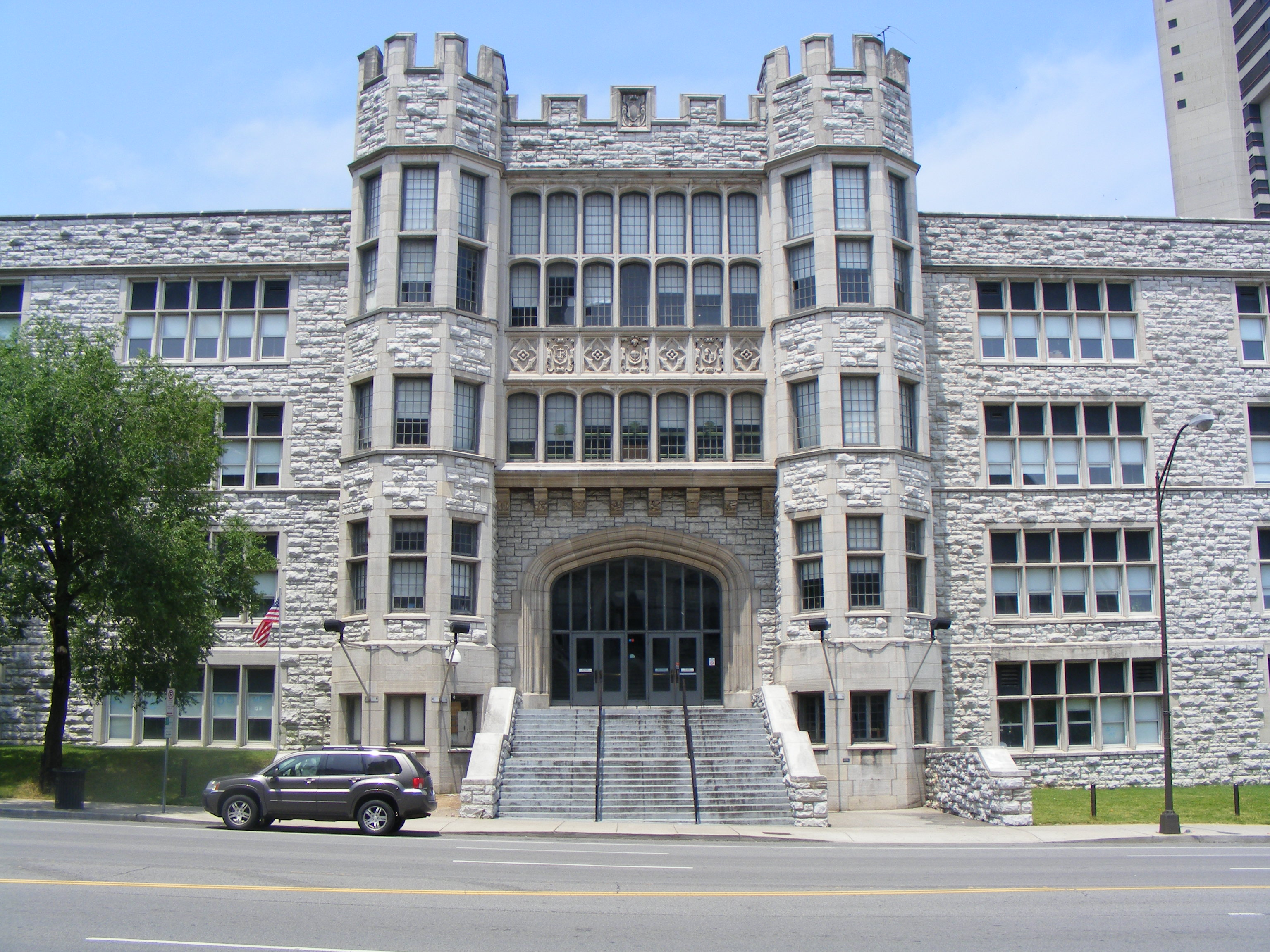
- Location: 700 Broadway; Nashville, Tennessee, USA
- Architect: William B. Ittner; Robert Sharp
- Website: humefogg.mnps.org
- NRHP reference No.: 74001909
- Added to NRHP: October 16, 1974

Hume-Fogg Academic Magnet High School is a public magnet high school serving grades 9–12 and located in downtown Nashville, Tennessee, United States.

== History ==
Hume School, serving the first through 12th grades, opened in 1855 on Eighth Avenue (Spruce Street) just north of Broad and was the first public school in Nashville.

In 1875 Fogg High School was built adjacent to Hume School at the corner of Broad and Eighth and absorbed its high school students. Around 1910 both schools were razed and replaced by Hume-Fogg High School, a Gothic Revival building, which opened in 1912. The building consists of five floors including a basement, which has several tunnels leading to various locations in downtown Nashville. However, they are currently boarded off and inaccessible. In 1942 Hume-Fogg was recast as a technical and vocational school.

It continued in this capacity until the 1972 court-supervised desegregation of Nashville's public school system, decades after the US Supreme Court ruled that segregation of public schools was unconstitutional. In 1983 Hume-Fogg was redeveloped as an academic magnet school for Nashville's gifted and talented secondary students. In the 2004–2005 school year Hume-Fogg celebrated its sesquicentennial anniversary.

== Academics ==
Hume-Fogg is an academic magnet school and offers 31 Advanced Placement (AP) courses. All academic courses—with the exception of PE and art courses—are taught at the honors or AP level.

Nearly 100 percent of graduates each year go on to four-year colleges, many earning prestigious academic scholarships in the process. Each year the Hume-Fogg senior class is granted over ten million dollars in cumulative scholarship and grant money from various universities across the United States.

In 2012, Hume-Fogg had twelve National Merit Semifinalists and four National Achievement Semifinalists, as well as four semifinalists in the Intel Science Talent Search Competition and three semifinalists in the Siemens Competition in Math, Science, and Technology.

In the 2006–2007 academic year Hume-Fogg received the National Siemens Award for one of the best science- and math-based academic programs in the country. In addition, Newsweek and U.S. News & World Report have consistently ranked Hume-Fogg among the top public high schools in America:

	2019	...	2013	2012	2011	2010	2009	2008	2007	2006
Newsweek			71 (2)	36 (1)	33 (1)	32 (1)	26 (1)	24 (2)	58 (2)	43 (2)
U.S. News & World Report	60 (2)		37 (1)	49 (1)	26 (1)	26 (1)	30 (1)			

(Parentheses have school's rank within Tennessee)

== Arts at Hume-Fogg ==
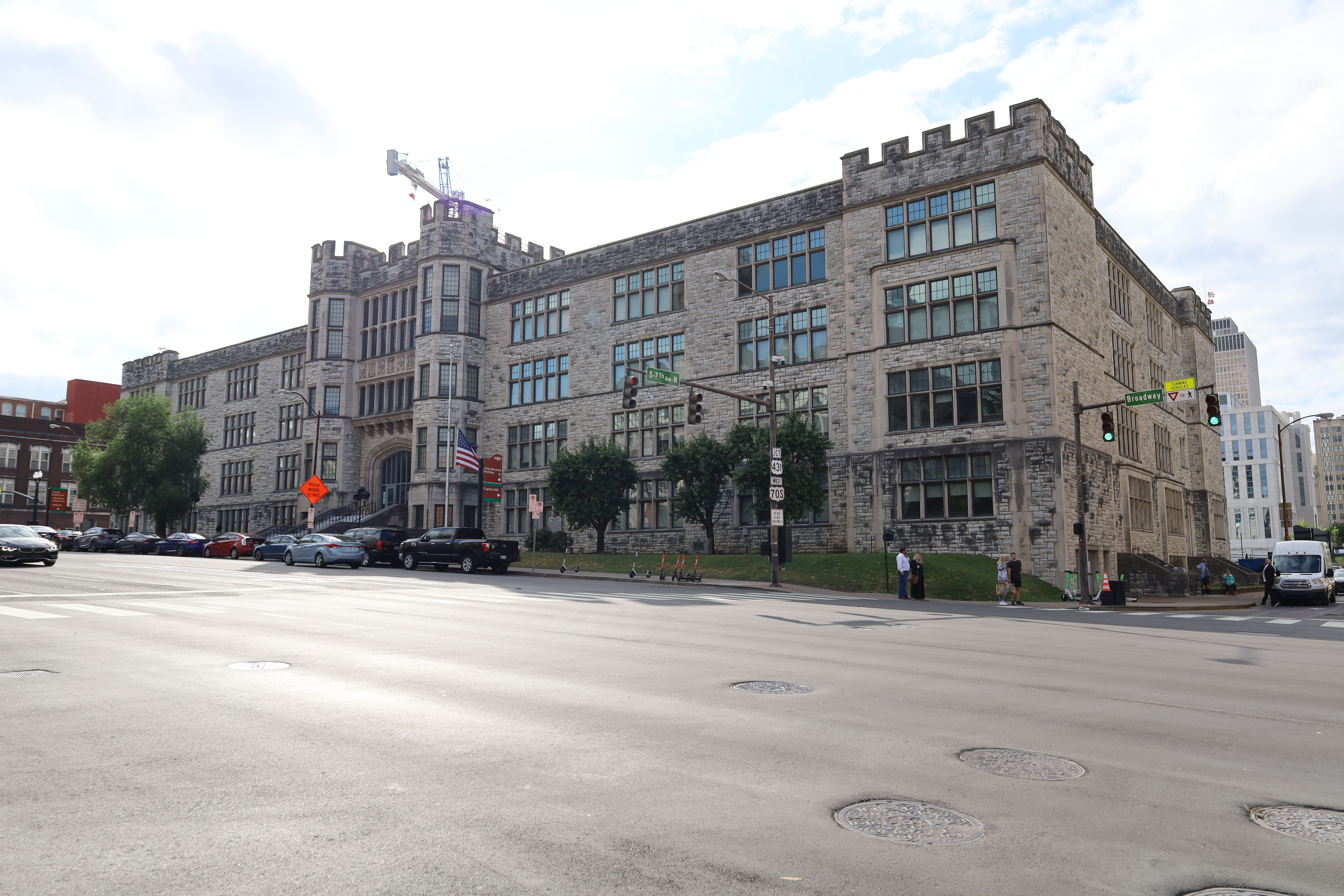
Hume-Fogg School in 2022

Hume-Fogg's Arts Department consists of Fine Arts, Band, Orchestra, Choir, and Theater programs.

Every year, Hume-Fogg's theater department collaborates with the choral and orchestral programs on the production of a fall musical. Recent productions include Hairspray, West Side Story, Les Misérables, and Beauty and the Beast.

The band program consists of the Concert Band and the Wind Ensemble. The school also has an out-of-school Jazz Band. The jazz band has competed in the Essentially Ellington High School Jazz Band Competition and Festival in New York City on several occasions. The Orchestra program consists of Beginning Strings, Philharmonic Orchestra, and Chamber Orchestra. The Chamber Orchestra has played at the Nashville Downtown Partnership and the Governor's Literacy Alliance Dinner for several years. The Choral program consists of a Mixed Chorus and a Show Choir. Many students perform in musical groups outside of school such as the Curb Youth Symphony, Tennessee Youth Symphony, Music City Youth Orchestra, and the Blair Chorus programs.

== Athletics ==
Hume-Fogg has the highest percentage of students in sports in Davidson County. In 1964, it was the first public high school in Nashville to desegregate its sports teams.

Varsity sports:

- Boys'/girls' basketball
- Boys' lacrosse
- Boys'/girls' tennis
- Baseball
- Bowling
- Boys'/girls' golf
- Cross country
- Boys'/girls' track
- Boys'/girls' soccer
- Wrestling
- Softball
- Volleyball
- Co-op football with East Nashville Magnet High School
- Girls' flag football
- Cheer

Club sports (sports that require student organization and self-funding):

- Boys'/girls' swimming
- Ultimate
- Ping pong
- Shooting

== School mascot ==
The school mascot, which was voted on by the student body in 2008, is Knightro, the Blue Knight. The school colors are blue and white.

== Notable alumni ==
- Ruby Amanfu, Grammy-nominated singer/songwriter
- Calpernia Addams, transgender entertainer, activist, and writer
- Johnny Beazley, professional baseball pitcher
- Francis Craig, songwriter, including Vanderbilt University fight song "Dynamite"
- Matt Friction, vocalist and guitarist for The Pink Spiders
- Fyütch, Grammy-nominated music artist and educator
- Phil Harris, comedian, actor, and singer
- Randall Jarrell, poet; with a historical marker at the school
- David Harrison Macon (or Uncle Dave Macon), Old time banjo player
- Delbert Mann, Academy Award-winning director
- Bettie Page, pinup queen and Playboy Playmate; graduated second in the class of 1940
- Ricardo Patton, college basketball coach
- Alex Renfroe, professional basketball player
- Dinah Shore, singer/actress
- Boyfriend, Songwriter, producer, and performance artist.
- Beasley Smith, big band musician and Nashville Songwriters Hall of Fame inductee
- Starlito (or All $tar Cashville Prince), rapper
- Street Symphony, Grammy-winning producer, music executive
