= The Unholy Three =

The Unholy Three can refer to the following:

- The Unholy Three, a 1917 novel by Tod Robbins
- The Unholy Three (1925 film), directed by Tod Browning
- The Unholy Three (1930 film), a remake of the 1925 film directed by Jack Conway
- The Unholy Three (magic trio), a magic cabaret act
- The Unholy Three (comics), a two-part DC comic book special, part of JSA: The Liberty Files
