= Rob Zabrecky =

American magician, actor, author and songwriter

- Zabrecky in 1992 at Al's Bar in Los Angeles
- Born: Burbank, California, U.S.
- Occupations: Actor, musician, magician, songwriter
- Height: 6 ft 0 in (183 cm)
- Spouse: Tommi Zabrecky

Robert Zabrecky is an American actor, author, magician, lecturer, and songwriter. His career began as a musician while being the frontman for the band Possum Dixon. In the later years of his career, he has found success as a magician, actor, and author.

== Life and career ==
Zabrecky was born and raised in Burbank, California. From 1989 to 1999, he was the singer-songwriter and bassist for the Los Angeles group Possum Dixon. The band, originally hailing from Silver Lake, released three albums during the 1990s.

During the mid-1990s, he began practicing magic and has since become a magician at the Magic Castle in Hollywood, California. In the mid-2000s, he began a career in acting and has since landed roles in films and television programs.

=== Musician ===
As the frontman for Possum Dixon, Zabrecky became a notable figure in the emerging Silver Lake independent music community of the early 1990s. During those years, he wrote, recorded and performed with several musicians and producers, including Beck, Earle Mankey, Tom Rothrock, Pleasant Gehman, Carla Bozulich, Tim O'Heir and others. Possum Dixon had a minor hit in 1993 with their first single, "Watch the Girl Destroy Me", from their debut album Possum Dixon, produced by Mankey. A second album, Star Maps, followed in 1996. In 1998, they released New Sheets, which would be the last album by the band. The LP, produced by the Cars' Ric Ocasek, featured material co-written with Fred Schneider, Jane Wiedlin, Dave Stewart and others.

Shortly after the breakup of Possum Dixon, Zabrecky spent time singing for the Los Angeles art rock band Human Hands and played bass in a Gun Club tribute band alongside original members Ward Dotson and Terry Graham.

In early 2010, he appeared on-stage with Maria McKee at a fundraiser in Hollywood. The pair sang a duet of Lou Reed's "Satellite of Love". They performed the song again as part of a Night of Zabrecky performance at the Steve Allen Theater in 2012.

In 2025, Zabrecky released the single "Our Magic", a tribute to some of his favorite magicians, mentalists and spirit conjurers. The song was released by In the Red Records on glow-in-the-dark 7-inch vinyl and streaming platforms, and was accompanied by a music video.

=== Magician ===
After his music career ended, Zabrecky has worked throughout the United States, Japan and Europe as a magician. Since 2002, he has been a regular performer at the Magic Castle, where he formed the magic trio the Unholy Three in 2003. He has also been the featured magician at annual magic conventions worldwide and appeared on the cover of magic-related journals and periodicals including Genii, Reel Magic and the Mandala.

Zabrecky is best known for an aberrant magician character he portrays by combining irreverent dark humor, mentalism and an artful use of elongated pauses in performances. Lauded for his performing and lecturing efforts in magic, Zabrecky has received eight awards from the Academy of Magical Arts at the Magic Castle.

Since 2010, Zabrecky has performed as a spirit medium inside the Magic Castle's Houdini Séance Room, where he has presented hundreds of theatrical Victorian-inspired séances for members of the Academy of Magical Arts and their guests.

After Zabrecky performed on Penn & Teller: Fool Us in August 2016, Penn Jillette said, "We were trying to think if there's ever been a mentalist doing a mentalist act that was sincerely funny and sincerely good. You may be the first ever."

The Zabrecky Hour, a one-man variety show, directed by John Lovick and Tommi Zabrecky, was premiered and developed at the Steve Allen Theater from 2010 to 2016. The show featured highlights from his Magic Castle act, song and dance, conversations with the moon and audience interaction. Reviewing the show for the Chicago Tribune in 2022, Chris Jones said, "Zabrecky is a highly accomplished magician and very funny, assuming you like your humor cynical and caustic, akin to a horror show of a bygone age. But what makes his highly interactive show worth seeing is his evident love of pushing things right to the edge and then maybe a little further."

In 2022, Zabrecky released SEANCE! With Zabrecky on In the Red Records. The recording, co-produced and recorded with songwriter and guitarist Emmett Kelly, features a "conduct your own séance" experience, and is pressed on glow-in-the-dark vinyl.

In 2026, The Zabrecky Hour, a concert film shot at Dynasty Typewriter in Los Angeles was released on Amazon Prime.

=== Actor ===
In 2015, Zabrecky landed a supporting role in Ryan Gosling's 2015 directorial debut Lost River, playing the master of ceremonies at an underground fetish nightclub. That same year, he garnered a starring role in the psychological thriller Decay, portraying a troubled theme park groundskeeper who falls in love with a corpse. In 2017, Zabrecky had a supporting role in the supernatural drama A Ghost Story.

As a television actor, he has made several appearances in popular shows, including Fallout, Strange Angel, Criminal Minds, CSI: NY, GLOW, Comedy Bang! Bang! and Angie Tribeca. He has also appeared in several short films and a wide range of television commercials.

Zabrecky has appeared at Theatre West in The Twilight Zone - Live on Stage, as well as other productions.

In 2019, Zabrecky and his wife Tommi Zabrecky created the supernatural comedy series The Other Side with Zabrecky. In each episode, Zabrecky invites guests into his home to participate in a séance to contact a departed spirit of their choice. Guests have included Jack Black, Jason Sudeikis, Kate Flannery, Will Forte, and David Arquette. The program is featured on the website Night Flight Plus.

=== Author ===
In June 2019, Zabrecky released his memoir, Strange Cures. The book chronicles Zabrecky's story of self-discovery, success, failure, and reinvention amidst the Los Angeles landscape of the '70s–'90s. The Los Angeles Times praised the book as "An ode to a forgotten L.A." Musician Jane Wiedlin of the Go-Go's dubbed it "A 1980s San Fernando Valley Time Machine."

In 2019, Zabrecky authored The A, B, Z's of Magic, which details methods of constructing and presenting an effective, meaningful, and ethical magic act. The text focuses on character development and is organized in alphabetical order. This manuscript originated as part of Zabrecky's award-winning lecture program. Zabrecky said, "Throughout my performing career, I've made it part of my crusade to demystify the creative process – taking apart its pieces one by one, examining them and putting them back together to understand how they work as a whole."

In 2026 he wrote, co-created, and performed an immersive, one-person show based on the origin story of the Ouija Board, Seance: the Board Awakens, at the Constellation Playhouse in Bloomington, Indiana.

=== Lecturer and guest speaker ===
Zabrecky has lectured and presented illustrated talks on magic, séances, midnight ghost shows, and Harry Houdini. He has given presentations at the Magic Castle, the Philosophical Research Society, Lily Dale, the Los Angeles Breakfast Club and other venues, as well as at film festivals and magic conventions worldwide.

At the Magic Castle, Zabrecky was voted Lecturer of the Year in 2016 and 2018 by the Academy of Magical Arts.

He has also presented talks concerning Harry Houdini and spiritualism, including an illustrated lecture on Houdini and the spirits.

=== Auctioneer ===
Zabrecky is a skilled auctioneer, trained by Bonhams auction house (known then as Butterfield & Butterfield) during the late 1990s. He has helped organizations such as the Silverlake Conservatory of Music, Beyond Baroque Literary Arts Center, the Leukemia & Lymphoma Society, Laguna Art Museum and many others with fundraising events.

== Personal life ==
Zabrecky lives with his wife, Tommi Zabrecky, whom he married in 1998.

== Works ==
Books

- Strange Cures (2019)
- The Feral Boy Who Lives in Griffith Park (2019) - contributor

Publications

- A, B, Z's of Magic (2019)
- Genii – The Conjuror's Magazine (cover feature, April 2013)
- Stories of Famous Magicians (contributor)
- Secrets of My Friends 2 (contributor)
- MAGIC, The Magazine for Magicians (contributor)
- M-U-M, The Society of American Magicians (contributor)
- An Exploration at the Intersection of Magic and Theater (2010)
- Smartish Pace art/poetry Journal (contributor)
- The Underground Guide to Los Angeles (contributor)
- Music for Deaf People chapbook (1992)

Awards and nominations

- 1999 LA Weekly Award for Best Pop/Rock Band (Award)
- 1999 California Music Awards (Award)
- 2008 Parlour Magician of the Year, Academy of Magical Arts (Nomination)
- 2009 Parlour Magician of the Year, Academy of Magical Arts (Nomination)
- 2010 Parlour Magician of the Year, Academy of Magical Arts (Nomination)
- 2010 Stage Magician of the Year, Academy of Magical Arts (Nomination)
- 2011 Lecturer of the Year, Academy of Magical Arts (Nomination)
- 2011 Stage Magician of the Year, Academy of Magical Arts (Award)
- 2012 Stage Magician of the Year, Academy of Magical Arts (Award)
- 2014 Parlour Magician of the Year, Academy of Magical Arts (Award)
- 2015 Parlour Magician of the Year, Academy of Magical Arts (Award)
- 2016 Lecturer of the Year, Academy of Magical Arts (Award)
- 2017 Lecturer of the Year, Academy of Magical Arts (Award)
- 2023 Close-Up Magician of the Year, Academy of Magical Arts (Nomination)
- 2024 Close-Up Magician, Academy of Magical Arts (Award)

Interviews

- The Dana Gould Hour, 2026
- Office Hours, 2026"
- The Stereo Image, 2026
- Abracadbabble, 2026,
- Creativity in Captivity, 2022
- Two Jons Don't Make a Right, 2022
- The Magic Word, 2021
- Who Books That, 2021
- The Dana Gould Hour, 2019.
- Boo Crew Podcast, 2019
- Monster Party, 2019
- Boo Crew Podcast, 2019
- Love Alexi, 2019
- Hollywood Anonymous, 2019
- Three Thousand, Melbourne 2012
- The Magic Newswire, 2012
- The Avant/Garde Diaries, 2012
- Dan & Dave, 2012
- The Alibi; Illusion Noir, 2012
- Los Angeles Times, 2011
- Pop Culture: Sweet Tea Pumpkin Pie, 2011
- Carson Daly, 2010
