= Hot Pink =

Hot pink is one of various shades of pink.

Hot Pink may refer to:

- Hot Pink (album), by Doja Cat, 2019
- Hot Pink (The Pink Spiders album), 2005
- "Hot Pink", a song by Let's Eat Grandma from the 2018 album I'm All Ears

== See also ==
- Pink (disambiguation)
