= Star Maps (album) =

Studio album by Possum Dixon
- Released: January 9, 1996
- Recorded: Spring 1995, Los Angeles
- Genre: Alternative rock
- Length: 42:25
- Label: Interscope
- Producer: Tim O'Heir

Possum Dixon chronology
Possum Dixon (1993)	Star Maps (1996)	New Sheets (1998)

Star Maps is the second studio album by American alternative rock band Possum Dixon. It was released in 1996 on Interscope Records.

== Critical reception ==
Professional ratings
Review scores
Source	Rating
AllMusic	3/5 stars
The Encyclopedia of Popular Music	3/5 stars
MusicHound Rock: The Essential Album Guide	3/5 stars

Robert Levine of Trouser Press called the album a "more mature effort [that] lacks some of its predecessor’s raw energy," writing that "though the stylistic expansion is admirable, Possum Dixon can’t disguise the fact that its basic strength remains stripped-down art-punk." Hobart Rowland of the Houston Press wrote that the album "tears down the Southern California myth with a finality reminiscent of L.A.-bashing works such as X's Los Angeles and the Eagles' Hotel California -- though in a context and style more akin to the tense intellect of the Velvet Underground and early Talking Heads." Rick Reger of the Chicago Tribune wrote that the band "garnishes its unassuming rockers with vibes, electric piano and mellotron to generate some unfashionably fun, tuneful bashing." Allison Stewart of CMJ New Music Monthly felt the album was "more of a good time than revisited new wave usually allows for", noting its "so-dark-they're-funny songs" and concluding that it was "an airless and dark, almost eerily self-contained piece that consistently undersells itself."

Spin included the album on its list of "The 10 Best Albums You Didn't Hear in '96," its annual review of relatively below-the-radar releases.

== Track listing ==
All lyrics by Rob Zabrecky; all music by Zabrecky, except where noted.

1. "Go West" – 3:04
2. "In Her Disco" – 2:43
3. "Radio Comets" (Zabrecky, O'Sullivan, Chavez) – 4:19
4. "Party Tonight" – 3:52
5. "Emergency's About to End" – 2:36
6. "General Electric" (Zabrecky, O'Sullivan) – 2:39
7. "Crashing Your Planet" – 3:01
8. "Personals" – 4:40
9. "Reds" – 2:07
10. "Skid Marks" (Zabrecky, O'Sullivan) – 2:18
11. "Artificial Sunlight" (Zabrecky, O'Sullivan, Chavez) – 3:15
12. "Apartment Song" (Zabrecky, O'Sullivan, Chavez) – 7:51

== Personnel ==
Credits adapted from CD liner notes.

Possum Dixon

- Rob Zabrecky
- Robert O'Sullivan
- Celso Chavez

Additional musicians

- Rich Treuel – drums
- Josh Freese – drums
- Byron Reynolds – drums
- "Sneaky" Pete Tomlinson – additional percussion

Technical

- Tim O'Heir – producer, engineer
- Phil Kaffel – additional mixing
- Chuck Reed – additional mixing
- Rob Zabrecky – design
- Robert O'Sullivan – design
- Kim Holt – design
