= God & Guns N' Roses =

2025 single by Tyler Braden

Single by Tyler Braden

from the album Devil and a Prayer
- Released: February 21, 2025
- Genre: Country
- Length: 3:36
- Label: Warner Music Nashville
- Songwriters: Tyler Braden; Jon Decious; Rian Ball
- Producer: Ball

Tyler Braden singles chronology
"Devil You Know" (2024)	"God & Guns N' Roses" (2025)	"To Tell You the Truth" (2025)

"God & Guns N' Roses" (stylized in all caps) is a song by American country music singer Tyler Braden, released on February 21, 2025 as a single from his debut studio album, Devil and a Prayer (2025). It was written by Braden himself, Jon Decious of The Pink Spiders and the producer Rian Ball. The song contains references to the band Guns N' Roses, such as their songs "Sweet Child o' Mine" and "Don't Cry"; it sees the protagonist falling in love with a girl at the bar who is screaming to "Paradise City" as it being played.

== Background ==
Tyler Braden said of the song:

Announcing my debut album with "God & Guns N' Roses" feels amazing because it's a great example of the direction our writing and creativity is going. I can't wait to hear how it makes y'all feel. And who doesn't love Guns N' Roses on some level?

== Charts ==
=== Weekly charts ===
Chart performance for "God & Guns N' Roses"
Chart (2025)	Peak position
US Bubbling Under Hot 100 (Billboard)	3
US Hot Country Songs (Billboard)	34

=== Year-end charts ===
Year-end chart performance for "God & Guns N' Roses"
Chart (2025)	Position
US Hot Country Songs (Billboard)	69
