= Joseph Wartnerchaney =

American director, screenwriter, and editor

- Born: Portland, Oregon, United States
- Occupations: Film director, screenwriter, film editor
- Years active: 2000–present
- Known for: Decay, Cirque Innosta, Conjure
- Website: wartnerchaney.com

Joseph Wartnerchaney (/ˌwɔːrtnərˈtʃæni/ WORT-nər-CHAN-ee) is an American director, screenwriter, and editor.

== Early life ==
Wartnerchaney was born in Portland, Oregon, United States.

== Career ==
Wartnerchaney is a nationally recognized film and live performance creator and director. He is known for writing and directing the motion picture Decay. Wartnerchaney has received rave reviews from Ain't It Cool News, Fangoria, and the Slaughterd Bird. His movie Decay premiered at the Denver Film Festival in 2015.

== Filmography ==
Title	Year	Director	Writer	Editor	Producer	notes
Tuscaloosa	2002	No	No	No	Yes	short
Boy Meets Girl	2004	Yes	Yes	Yes	Yes	student film
Decay	2015	Yes	Yes	Yes	No	
