= Matt Friction =

- Born: Matthew Bell; February 8, 1981 (age 44); Nashville, Tennessee, U.S.
- Origin: United States
- Genres: Garage rock, Indie rock, Doo-wop, Psychedelic pop
- Occupation(s): Musician, songwriter
- Instrument(s): Vocals, guitar
- Years active: 1998–present

Matthew Bell, better known as Matt Friction, is an American musician, singer, and songwriter.

Friction's music career began in 1998 as lead singer and songwriter of the band Silent Friction. He later moved on to establish Garage rock band The Pink Spiders with Bob Ferrari and Jon Decious. During a brief hiatus in 2009, Friction formed two new bands, Matt Friction & the Cheap Shots and The Dozen Dimes, both releasing individual material.

== Early life ==
Matt Friction was born and raised in Nashville, Tennessee and graduated from Hume Fogg Magnet High School in 1999. He attended Middle Tennessee State University from 1999 to 2000.

== History ==
=== 1998-2003: Silent Friction and early career ===
Friction established the band Silent Friction with fellow members Nathan Hansen (bass), Kelby Caldwell (guitar), and James Nelson (drums) in 1998. They played on a regular basis at venues such as NXT Generation, Indienet and The Muse in Nashville. The band eventually formed a loyal fan base after touring several locations. In 2001, Nelson was replaced by Dan Sommers.

Friction played occasionally for Oliver's Army, where Bob Ferrari was the drummer. He also launched a solo project entitled Straight Jacket Valentine. Soon enough, both Friction and Ferrari decided to leave their own musical projects to make music together, recruiting Jon Decious as bassist, and Jamie Mechan, a second guitarist, who played with them only for a short while. After contemplating names such as The Pink Tigers and The Pink Diablos, they settled on The Pink Spiders.

=== 2009-2010: Subsequent projects ===
In 2009, with the Pink Spiders on hiatus, Friction announced that he was focusing on two new projects. One group, Matt Friction & the Cheap Shots, completed an album in the summer of 2009 in Sausalito, California with producer Jerry Harrison. A new release entitled Matt Friction & the Cheap Shots and containing nine songs was published online in February 2010 through the band's bandcamp website. The album included a cameo by Brett Anderson from The Donnas.

His next project was doo-wop/garage outfit The Dozen Dimes, who began recording in February 2010. The band released an album on its website, thedozendimes.com, on April 6, 2010, entitled Get Real Gone With... The Dozen Dimes. The 11-track release drew influences from a variety of musical genres, including doo-wop, garage rock, psychedelic pop, and soul. An early version of The Dozen Dimes' song "Maybelline" is featured on the Projects' MySpace page.

== Discography ==
=== Silent Friction ===
- Quitters Never Lose (2002)
- The Thought That Counts (2003)

=== Straight Jacket Valentine ===
- A Torrid Account of a Tired Affair

=== The Pink Spiders ===
- The Pink Spiders Are Taking Over! (2004)
- Hot Pink (2005)
- Teenage Graffiti (2006)
- Subterranean EP (2008)
- Sweat It Out (2008)
- Mutations (2018)

=== Matt Friction & the Cheap Shots ===
- Matt Friction & the Cheap Shots (2010)

=== The Dozen Dimes ===
- Get Real Gone with... The Dozen Dimes (2010)

=== The Hot Veins ===
- The Hot Veins (2014)

=== Broken Bats ===
- Broken Bats (2015)
