= Beatitude (album) =

Studio album by Ric Ocasek
- Released: January 3, 1983
- Studio: Syncro Sound (Boston, Massachusetts)
- Genre: New wave; pop rock; synth-pop
- Length: 45:50
- Label: Geffen
- Producer: Ric Ocasek

Ric Ocasek chronology
| Beatitude (1983) | This Side of Paradise (1986) |

Singles from Beatitude
- 1. "Something to Grab For" Released: 1983; 2. "Jimmy Jimmy" Released: 1983; 3. "Connect Up to Me" Released: 1983

Professional ratings
Review scores
| Source | Rating |
|---|---|
| AllMusic | 3/5 stars |
| Rolling Stone | 3/5 stars |

Beatitude is the debut solo studio album by Ric Ocasek, primary vocalist, rhythm guitarist, songwriter, and frontman for the American new wave band the Cars. It was released on January 3, 1983, by Geffen Records. It features contributions from Greg Hawkes of the Cars on keyboards, Stephen George of Ministry on drums, Fuzzbee Morse and Roger Greenawalt on guitars, as well as Jules Shear and Stephen Hague from Jules and the Polar Bears.

The album peaked at No. 28 on the U.S. Billboard 200 in spring of 1983.

== Title ==
The Beatitudes (/biˈætɪtjud/) are eight or nine blessings recounted by Jesus in the Sermon on the Mount in the Gospel of Matthew. Here, the title is pronounced "beat-itude" (/ˈbiːtɪtjud/), a portmanteau of the words "beat" and "attitude", and pays homage to the 1950s–70s poetry magazine Beatitude, which featured work by poets including Allen Ginsberg. The 1997 Geffen CD issue of the album misprinted the title on the disc as "Beautitude".

== Track listing ==
All tracks are written by Ric Ocasek, except where noted.

Side one
| No. | Title | Length |
|---|---|---|
| 1. | "Jimmy Jimmy" | 4:57 |
| 2. | "Something to Grab For" | 3:43 |
| 3. | "Prove" | 3:56 |
| 4. | "I Can't Wait" | 3:43 |
| 5. | "Connect Up to Me" | 4:25 |

Side two
| No. | Title | Writer(s) | Length |
|---|---|---|---|
| 6. | "A Quick One" | | 3:37 |
| 7. | "Out of Control" | Ric Ocasek; Greg Hawkes | 4:41 |
| 8. | "Take a Walk" | | 4:38 |
| 9. | "Sneak Attack" | | 3:55 |
| 10. | "Time Bomb" | | 5:03 |
| Total length: | | | 45:50 |

- Although the album track "Connect Up to Me" was given an extended 12" remix, it was never released as a single. An extended mix that clocks in at 7:37 is on the cassette and CD editions.

Additional Tracks, GEFFEN B0031508-02, 2020
| No. | Title | Length |
|---|---|---|
| 1. | "Jimmy Jimmy (Single Version)" | 3:55 |
| 2. | "Prove (Extended Remix)" | 6:24 |
| 3. | "Connect Up to Me (Remix/Extended Version)" | 7:20 |
| 4. | "Jimmy Jimmy (A New Extended Version)" | 5:07 |

== Personnel ==
=== Musicians ===
- Ric Ocasek – vocals, keyboards, guitars
- Stephen Hague – keyboards (1–6)
- Fuzzbee Morse – keyboards (2, 3, 10), guitars (2, 3, 10)
- Greg Hawkes – keyboards (4, 5, 7)
- Casey Lindström – guitars (2)
- Roger Greenawalt – guitars (3, 8, 9)
- Darryl Jenifer – bass (2–4, 9, 10)
- Akio Akashi – bass (6)
- "Miss Linn" – drums (1, 6–8)
- Stephen George – drums (2–5, 9, 10)
- Deric Dyer – saxophone (3)
- Antonia DePortago – vocals (1)
- Steve Cataldo – vocals (3)
- Jules Shear – vocals (3)

=== Production ===
- Ric Ocasek – producer
- David Heglmeier – tape operator
- Thom Moore – tape operator
- Ian Taylor – engineer
- Walter Turbitt – assistant engineer
- Andy Topeka – resident technician
- George Marino – mastering at Sterling Sound (New York City, New York)
- Jeri McManus – graphic layout
- Bob Carlos Clarke – cover and sleeve photography
- Boo Topeka – symbols
- Elliot Roberts – management
- All songs published by Ric Ocasek Music, except "Out of Control" (published by Ric Ocasek Music/Oversnare Music-Lido Music)

== Charts ==
Chart performance for Beatitude
| Chart (1983) | Peak position |
|---|---|
| New Zealand Albums (RMNZ) | 31 |
| US Billboard 200 | 28 |
