= Fireball Zone =

Studio album by Ric Ocasek
- Released: 1991
- Studios: Skyline and One Take (New York City, New York); Ocean Way (Hollywood, California)
- Genre: Electronic pop
- Length: 54:46
- Label: Reprise
- Producers: Nile Rodgers; Ric Ocasek; Rick Nowels

Ric Ocasek chronology
| This Side of Paradise (1986) | Fireball Zone (1991) | Quick Change World (1993) |

Fireball Zone is the third solo album by the American musician Ric Ocasek, frontman and songwriter of the Cars. The first single from the 1991 release was "Rockaway".

== Production ==
The album was produced primarily by Nile Rodgers and Ric Ocasek. Its title is a reference to Thomas Pynchon's Gravity's Rainbow. "Over and Over" and "The Way You Look Tonight" are ballads. In contrast to his Cars days, Ocasek recorded the album live, with his band, rather than part by part.

Fireball Zone is the only album of Ocasek's nearly 40-year recording career—whether solo, with the Cars, or with his early group, Milkwood—that does not include contributions from multi-instrumentalist Greg Hawkes.

== Critical reception ==
Professional ratings
Review scores
| Source | Rating |
|---|---|
| AllMusic | 4/5 stars |
| Calgary Herald | D |
| Chicago Tribune | 3/4 stars |
| Rolling Stone | 3/5 stars |

The Ottawa Citizen wrote that "the main thrust of Fireball Zone is to emphasize a funk element within what has always been Ocasek's music style—cold, lean, electronic pop with a tortured bottom end." The Chicago Tribune opined that Fireball Zone "may not be a masterpiece, but it's better than any album by the repetitive Cars, easily one of the most overrated bands of the '80s." The St. Petersburg Times determined that the album finds Ocasek's "rubber-band voice crawling over indistinguishable over-synthesized tunes set to a maddeningly tedious beat."

== Track listing ==
All tracks are written by Ric Ocasek, except where noted.

| No. | Title | Writer(s) | Length |
|---|---|---|---|
| 1. | "Rockaway" | | 4:21 |
| 2. | "Touch Down Easy" | Ric Ocasek, Rick Nowels | 4:12 |
| 3. | "Come Back" | | 4:20 |
| 4. | "The Way You Look Tonight" | | 4:38 |
| 5. | "All We Need Is Love" | | 4:57 |
| 6. | "Over and Over" | | 5:30 |
| 7. | "Flowers of Evil" | | 4:42 |
| 8. | "They Tried" | | 3:53 |
| 9. | "Keep That Dream" | | 4:26 |
| 10. | "Balance" | | 4:42 |
| 11. | "Mister Meaner" | | 4:50 |
| 12. | "Fireball Zone" | | 4:24 |
| Total length: | | | 54:46 |

== Personnel ==
- Ric Ocasek – vocals, keyboards, guitars
- Richard Hilton – keyboards
- Larry Mitchell – lead guitar (1–9, 12)
- Nile Rodgers – guitars (1–9, 12)
- Dann Huff – guitars (10, 11)
- Al Berry – bass
- Larry Aberman – drums (1–9, 12)
- Mickey Curry – drums (10, 11)
- Steve Elson – horns
- Stan Harrison – horns
- Matt Collehon – horns
- Tawatha Agee – backing vocals
- Dennis Collins – backing vocals
- Curtis King Jr. – backing vocals
- Fonzi Thornton – backing vocals

Production

- Nile Rodgers – producer
- Ric Ocasek – producer, basic track producer (10, 11), other computer photography
- Nile Rodgers – producer
- Rick Nowels – basic track producer (10, 11)
- Jon Goldberger – engineer, mixing
- David Heglmeier – basic track engineer
- Steve MacMillan – basic track recording (10, 11)
- Katherine Miller – assistant engineer
- Hiro Ishihara – assistant engineer
- Justin Luchter – associate engineer
- Dave Schiffman – assistant engineer
- George Marino – mastering at Sterling Sound (New York, NY)
- Jeff Gold – art direction
- Janet Levinson – design
- Paulina Porizkova – cover artwork
- Marco Glaviano – photography

== Charts ==
| Chart (1991) | Peak position |
|---|---|
| Australian Albums (ARIA Charts) | 119 |
