= Emotion in Motion (song) =

1986 single by Ric Ocasek

Single by Ric Ocasek

from the album This Side of Paradise
- B-side: "P.F.J."
- Released: August 18, 1986
- Genre: Pop rock
- Length: 4:41
- Label: Geffen
- Songwriter: Ric Ocasek
- Producers: Ric Ocasek; Chris Hughes; Ross Cullum

Ric Ocasek singles chronology
"Connect Up to Me" (1983)	"Emotion in Motion" (1986)	"True to You" (1986)

Music video
- "Emotion in Motion" on YouTube

"Emotion in Motion" is a song by Ric Ocasek, primary vocalist, rhythm guitarist, songwriter, and frontman for the American new wave band of the Cars. It was released as the first single on August 18, 1986, from his second studio album, This Side of Paradise (1986). The tune topped the Album Rock Tracks chart and reached number 15 on the Billboard Hot 100. The song features Tears for Fears' guitarist, and co-lead vocalist Roland Orzabal as a guest musician. It was Ocasek's only top 40 hit as a solo artist.

== Background ==
Following the Cars' 1985 Greatest Hits release, its members split up to pursue solo projects. Lead guitarist Elliot Easton released a solo album in 1985, and both Ocasek and co-lead vocalist and bassist Benjamin Orr did the same in 1986. Just as "Emotion in Motion" was Ocasek's only solo song to reach the Top 40, Orr's "Stay the Night" was the latter's only solo Top 40 hit.

The music video features Ocasek in a forest with an unconscious young woman. He slays a dragon to obtain a potion which successfully revives her, and is followed by a little person on the journey.

The band reunited to record their sixth studio album Door to Door (1987), which produced "You Are the Girl", the group's last Top 40 single.

== Charts ==
=== Weekly charts ===
Weekly chart performance for "Emotion in Motion"
Chart (1986)	Peak position
Australia (Kent Music Report)	8
New Zealand (Recorded Music NZ)	35
US Billboard Hot 100	15
US Adult Contemporary (Billboard)	8
US Top Rock Tracks (Billboard)	1

=== Year-end charts ===
Year-end chart performance for "Emotion in Motion"
Chart (1986)	Position
Australia (Kent Music Report)	95
