= Teenage Graffiti =

Studio album by The Pink Spiders
- Released: August 1, 2006
- Recorded: 2005, New York City, New York, Los Angeles, California
- Genres: Pop-punk, dance-punk, indie rock, garage rock
- Length: 39:47
- Label: Geffen
- Producers: Ric Ocasek; Jerry Harrison ("Hey Jane")

The Pink Spiders chronology
Hot Pink (2005)	Teenage Graffiti (2006)	Sweat It Out (2008)

Singles from Teenage Graffiti
- 1. "Little Razorblade" Released: April 4, 2006

Teenage Graffiti is the second studio album by the American rock band The Pink Spiders, released on August 1, 2006. It is the band's major label debut.

== Background and recording ==
The Pink Spiders were signed by Geffen Records after performing at The Viper Room on March 2, 2005. The band traveled to New York City to record the album at Electric Lady Studios with producer Ric Ocasek. A second recording location, Spiral Studios, is listed in the album notes.

The group re-recorded several songs from their catalogue at the request of the label. "Soft Smoke", "Modern Swinger", "Hollywood Fix", "Little Razorblade", and "Teenage Graffiti" — all from Hot Pink — were updated and new versions were released.

== Musical and lyrical content ==
Teenage Graffiti has been described as a solid pop punk record that makes use of rich guitar textures, vocal harmonies, and an arena-inspired sound. It has been noted to be influenced by the vocal harmonies of The Beach Boys and The Beatles and 1960s rock. Similarities have been made to Cheap Trick, Ben Folds, and Weezer.

Lyrically, the album has been described as simple, personal, and witty. It makes use of wordplay, evident in lines such as, "don't call it a crush baby… you know I love you too much to be crushed like that," and, "don't let your life's income determine your life's outcome." There are references to girls, cigarettes, sex, and drinking, but they are done in a fictitious manner.

The track "Teenage Graffiti" contains the lyric, "When you call me your pretender, you know you shatter my heart". This line may be considered a tribute to The Exploding Hearts, who released a song called "I'm a Pretender" with a similar lyric. "I'm a Pretender" appeared on the album Guitar Romantic and The Exploding Hearts have been noted as an influence by the band.

== Promotion ==
"Little Razorblade" was released as a single in April 2006; its music video was directed by Joseph Kahn and debuted on MTV's Total Request Live that same month. The song received a significant amount of airplay — it reached the top spot on Los Angeles-based radio station, KROQ, and was played in the retail stores Hollister Co. and Urban Outfitters.

The Pink Spiders performed at the Vans Warped Tour in support of Teenage Graffiti. The album peaked at number 84 on the Billboard 200 shortly after its release in August 2006.

A video was also released for "Modern Swinger".

"Easy Way Out" appeared on Madden NFL 07.

== Reception ==
Professional ratings
Review scores
Source	Rating
Absolutepunk	86%
Allmusic	3.5/5 stars

The album was generally well received. Rolling Stone magazine said: "Enough catchy charm and ass-kicking propulsion to suggest a ballsier Weezer or a punk-schooled Cheap Trick… The Spiders are ready to spin a power-pop revolution." The now defunct publication, Punk Planet, noted: "Despite the flavors of old rock n roll blended into their sound, the Pink Spiders manage to sound modern and new."

== Track listing ==
All songs were written by Matt Friction.

1. "Soft Smoke" – 3:21
2. "Saturday Nite Riot" – 3:01
3. "Modern Swinger" – 3:13
4. "Hollywood Fix" – 2:30
5. "Little Razorblade" – 3:57
6. "Back to the Middle" – 3:20
7. "Nobody Baby" – 2:34
8. "Hey Jane" – 4:30
9. "Still Three Shy" – 2:46
10. "Adalae" – 3:18
11. "Easy Way Out" – 2:38
12. "Pretend That This Is Fiction" – 3:36
13. "Secret Song" – 1:03
  - This track is not shown in many places that show the track listing.

iTunes Bonus Track

- "Teenage Graffiti" – 2:32

== Personnel ==
The Pink Spiders

- Matt Friction – composer, guitar, vocals
- Jon Decious – bass
- Bob Ferrari – drums

Additional musicians

- Jerry Harrison – musician
- "Diamond" Dave Davidson – musician
- Benjamin Kalb – musician
- Roger Lent – musician

Recording and production

- Ric Ocasek – producer
- Jerry Harrison – producer on "Hey Jane"
- Tom Lord-Alge – mixing
- Jordan Schur – A&R, executive producer
- Kent Hertz – engineer
- Mark Owen – engineer
- Eric "ET" Thorngren – engineer
- Femio Hernández – assistant
- Ted Jensen – mastering

Visual design

- Jeff Breil – art direction, design, layout
- Tommy Barrett – photography
- Bo Streeter – photography

== Charts ==
Chart (2006)	Peak Position
US Billboard 200	84

== Release history ==
Year	Label	Format	Catalogue number
2006	Suretone/Geffen	CD	7379
2006	Suretone/Geffen	CD	647702
2007	Polydor	CD	
