= Decay (2015 film) =

- Film poster
- Directed by: Joseph Wartnerchaney
- Written by: Joseph Wartnerchaney
- Produced by: Cole Huling; Michael Haskins; Deby Ouellette (EP)
- Starring: Rob Zabrecky; Jackie Hoffman; Lisa Howard; Elisha Yaffe; Hannah Barron; Reese Ehlinge; Whitney Hayes; Jason Knauf; Joseph Phillips; J.T. Richardson
- Cinematography: Chuck Fryberger
- Edited by: Joseph Wartnerchaney
- Music by: Michael Shaieb; Brent Lord
- Production company: Ghost Orchid Films
- Distributed by: Uncork'd Entertainment
- Release date: November 9, 2015 (Denver)
- Running time: 98 minutes
- Country: United States
- Language: English

Decay is a 2015 American psychological thriller film. Starring Rob Zabrecky, Jackie Hoffman, Lisa Howard, Elisha Yaffe, Hannah Barron and Reese Ehlinger. Written and Directed by Joseph Wartnerchaney it tells the story of a troubled middle-aged man who falls in love with a corpse.

The film premiered at the 2015 Denver International Film Festival.

== Plot ==
Rob Zabrecky stars as Jonathan, a middle-aged groundskeeper at a local theme park who suffers from a debilitating case of OCD. One day his daily routine is disrupted by a surprise visitor in his basement: a beautiful young woman who, through a jarring turn of events, ends up dead. Jonathan panics and chooses not to report the dead girl. Jonathan is happy to have a friend, until the police start closing in, and his mind, and the body of the girl, begin to decay.

== Production ==
The film, based on a true story, and was filmed in the Mission Viejo neighborhood of Aurora, Denver and at Elitch Gardens Theme Park in Denver, Colorado in 2013.

== Awards ==
Winner of the True Grit Award – 2015 Denver Film Festival.

== Reviews ==
"Contrary to many films of its kind, DECAY's plot fosters hope in a most unlikely scenario. - I don’t know, man. I really dug it." -Fangoria

"Meticulous and engrossing, DECAY is a film that involves some pretty horrific subject matter, but in the end, it perfectly exemplifies in a sometimes gorgeous, sometimes soul-crunching, and sometimes nightmarish manner." -Aint It Cool News

"With strong visuals and fantastically realised characters, Decay rises above its obvious inspirations such as the recent Maniac remake, One Hour Photo, and Psycho, to become its own rare beast: A horror with more heart than most." -UK Horror Scene

"Captivating yet Tragic Character Study" -Red Carpet Report

"Decay cleverly takes a subject that would normally serve as an excuse to deliver trashy clichés and injects some interesting concepts; loneliness being the main theme tackled head-on in a way rarely seen." -The Slaughtered Bird

"Featuring a mesmerizing performance by Rob Zabrecky in writer-director Joseph Wartnerchaney’s vividly nightmarish pic." -Irish Film Critic
