= Tyler Braden =

American singer-songwriter (born 1993)

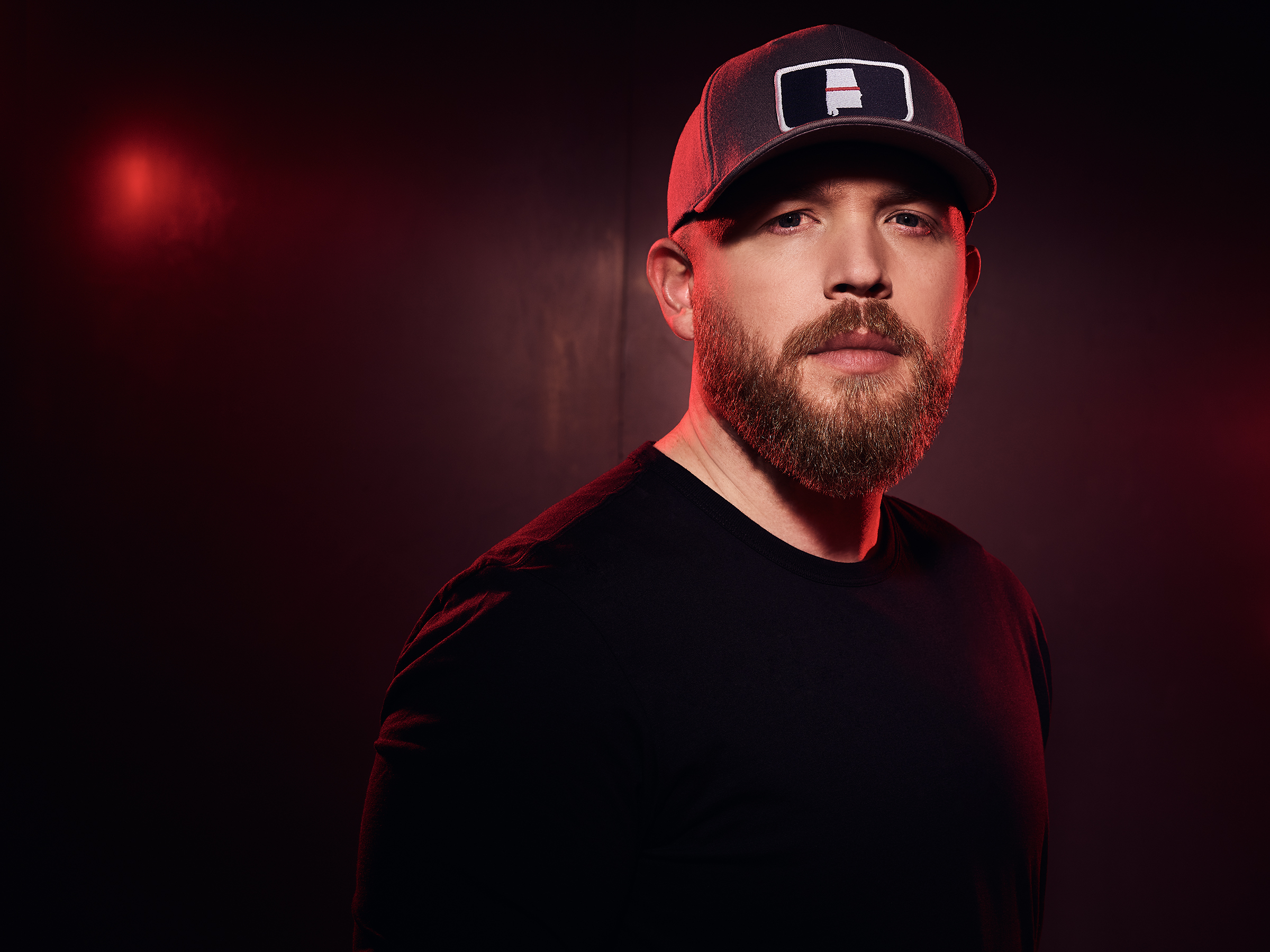

Background information
- Born: Tyler Braden; February 5, 1993 (age 33); Slapout, Alabama, U.S.
- Genres: Country; country rock
- Occupations: Singer-songwriter; musician
- Years active: 2017–present
- Label: Warner Music Nashville
- Website: www.tylerbraden.com

Tyler Braden (born February 5, 1993) is an American country music singer-songwriter and musician from Slapout, Alabama. His debut studio album, Devil and a Prayer, was released in 2025. He is best known for reaching the final of the American Song Contest with the song "Seventeen", qualifying to the final round and placing last out of 10 songs. His songs "Try Losing One", which has gained over thirty million streams, "Devil You Know", which achieved platinum certification from the RIAA, and "God & Guns N' Roses", which became his first single to chart on the Billboard Hot Country Songs chart. Braden has toured internationally with Luke Bryan, Brooks & Dunn, Dierks Bentley, Brothers Osborne, Mitchell Tenpenny, Warren Zeiders, and Darius Rucker.

== Early life ==
Braden was born to Neil and Faith Braden and raised in Slapout, Alabama and attended Holtville High School. He started a rock band called Tempting Fate (later renamed Adamant) with some friends at age nineteen and performed locally around Montgomery and other parts of central and southern Alabama for several years. During this time, Braden expressed that he was listening to country music, and would lean into that sound when he would play solo acoustic shows, having been introduced to the genre by his parents, who would sing in bars, restaurants, and private parties. Braden moved from Slapout to Brentwood, Tennessee when he was twenty-seven, and eventually moved to Nashville to pursue music. Prior to becoming a full-time musician, Braden worked as a trained firefighter and would work on songs during his breaks.

== Career ==
Braden performing in 2026

Braden released his debut single, "Little Red Wine", in 2017.

In 2022, Braden represented the state of Tennessee in the American Song Contest, which aired on NBC between March 21 and May 9, with the song "Seventeen" which he wrote himself. Braden made it to the grand final and finished in tenth place.

Braden released the extended play Neon Grave on March 3, 2023. Produced by Randy Montana, the project featured six tracks, including a re-recorded version of "Try Losing One" with Sydney Sierota.

On February 21, 2025, Braden announced his debut album, Devil and a Prayer, would be released on May 16. The single, "God & Guns N' Roses" was released alongside the announcement. The song reached number 34 on the Hot Country Songs chart, Braden's first single to appear there.

== Discography ==
=== Studio albums ===
List of albums, with selected details
| Title | Album details | Peak chart positions | | Certifications |
| Title | Album details | US Country | AUS Country | Certifications |
|---|---|---|---|---|
| Devil and a Prayer | Release date: May 16, 2025; Label: Warner Music Nashville; Format: CD, digital download, LP, streaming | 46 | 26 | MC: Gold |

=== Extended plays ===
List of albums, with selected details
| Title | Album details |
|---|---|
| What Do They Know | Release date: November 19, 2021; Label: Warner Music Nashville; Format: Digital download, streaming |
| Neon Grave | Release date: March 3, 2023; Label: Warner Music Nashville; Format: Digital download, streaming |
| One Take Sessions: Vol.1 | Release date: August 18, 2023; Label: Warner Music Nashville; Format: Digital download, streaming |

=== Singles ===
List of singles
| Title | Year | Album | Certifications |
|---|---|---|---|
| "Little Red Wine" | 2017 | Non-album single | |
| "Leave Me Alone" | 2018 | Non-album single | |
| "Thank Me For That" | 2019 | Non-album single | |
| "Brother" | 2020 | Non-album single | |
| "Love Is a Dead End Road" | 2020 | Non-album single | |
| "Secret" | 2020 | Non-album single | |
| "Pretty Paper" | 2020 | Non-album single | |
| "What Do They Know" | 2021 | What Do They Know | |
| "Ways To Miss You" | 2021 | What Do They Know | |
| "Seventeen" | 2022 | American Song Contest | |
| "Try Losing One" (with Sydney Sierota) | 2022 | Neon Grave | MC: Gold |
| "Neon Grave" | 2023 | Neon Grave | |
| "Friends" | 2023 | Non-album single | |
| "Devil You Know" | 2024 | Devil and a Prayer | RIAA: Platinum; MC: 3× Platinum; RMNZ: Gold |
| "More Than a Prayer" | 2024 | Devil and a Prayer | |
| "Devil" | 2025 | Devil and a Prayer | |
| "God & Guns N' Roses" | 2025 | Devil and a Prayer | MC: Platinum |
| "To Tell You the Truth" | 2025 | Devil and a Prayer | |
| "Right on Track" with Kaitlin Butts | 2025 | Devil and a Prayer | |
| "Might Be Dangerous" | 2025 | Devil and a Prayer | |
