= Negative Theater =

Studio album by Ric Ocasek
- Released: October 1993
- Studio: One Take and Electric Lady (New York City, New York)
- Genre: New wave
- Length: 59:59
- Label: Reprise
- Producer: Ric Ocasek

Ric Ocasek chronology
Quick Change World (1993)	Negative Theater (1993)	Getchertikitz (1996)

Professional ratings
Review scores
Source	Rating
Allmusic	link

Negative Theater, a European-only CD, is the fifth solo album released by Ric Ocasek.

Negative Theater was originally intended to be Ocasek's fourth solo effort, consisting of a double CD and a book of poetry. However, in North America, Reprise Records declined to release the CD in Ocasek's original form. Instead, the company took seven tracks from Ocasek's project, and had him record seven additional tracks with producer Mike Shipley. The resulting record was issued as Quick Change World in North America only.

For European release, Negative Theater was issued as a fifteen track CD. It included the seven "Left Side" tracks that were issued on Quick Change World, and eight tracks that are exclusive to this album.

== Track listing ==
All tracks are written by Ric Ocasek, except where indicated.

No.	Title	Writer(s)	Length
1.	"I Still Believe"		1:28
2.	"Come Alive"		3:51
3.	"Quick Change World"		4:09
4.	"Ride with Duce"		4:05
5.	"What's on TV"		4:53
6.	"Shake a Little Nervous"		3:58
7.	"Hopped Up"		5:05
8.	"Take Me Silver"		3:40
9.	"Telephone Again"		0:59
10.	"Race to Nowhere"	Alan Vega	9:20
11.	"Help Me Find America"		3:58
12.	"Who Do I Pay"		4:39
13.	"Wait For Fate"		4:43
14.	"What Is Time"		4:48
15.	"Fade Away"		5:23
Total length:			59:59

Tracks 1–3, 5, 7, 9 & 11 previously appeared on Quick Change World.

== Personnel ==
- Ric Ocasek – vocals, keyboards, guitars
- Roger Greenawalt – keyboards, guitars
- Greg Hawkes – keyboards (3, 13)
- Eric Schermerhorn – guitars
- Darryl Jenifer – bass
- Nano the 2'nd – drums

=== Production ===
- Ric Ocasek – producer, engineer, art direction, design, photography
- David Heglmeier – engineer
- Chris Shaw – mix engineer
- George Marino – mastering at Sterling Sound (New York, NY)
- Mick Haggerty – design
- Elliot Roberts for Lookout Management – management
