= The Unholy Three (magic trio) =

The Unholy Three are a magic cabaret trio composed of magicians David Lovering (drummer of the Pixies), Rob Zabrecky (former songwriter/singer/bassist of Possum Dixon) and Fitzgerald (creator of the cult cable television show "O'Brien's People" and author of "Bachelor 2000"). The trio formed in 2003 at the Magic Castle in Hollywood by presenting a quickly paced provocative Dada-esque combination of wizardry, mentalism and off-beat humor. The trio has been praised by the magic community which includes favorable reviews by luminaries Penn Jillette (Penn & Teller), Max Maven and Milt Larsen. In addition to their performances at the Magic Castle, The trio performs their magic and mentalism act at colleges and universities throughout the United States. In 2005, they released a performance DVD produced by Carlos Grasso (Carl Grasso), featuring a whimsical introduction by Grant Lee Phillips. Additionally, they have been profiled in Magic Magazine, the LA Weekly and other publications.

In October 2006, they presented highlights of their show to audiences in the Magic Castle's Parlour of Prestidigitation. In May 2007, they performed to a sold-out crowd at The Steve Allen Theater in Hollywood.
