= Quick Change World =

Studio album by Ric Ocasek
- Released: September 28, 1993
- Studios: Electric Lady and One Take (New York City, New York); A&M (Hollywood, California)
- Genre: New wave
- Length: 50:54
- Label: Reprise
- Producers: Mike Shipley; Ric Ocasek

Ric Ocasek chronology
Fireball Zone (1991)	Quick Change World (1993)	Getchertikitz (1996)

Professional ratings
Review scores
Source	Rating
Allmusic	3/5 stars

Quick Change World is the fourth solo album released by Ric Ocasek, who was the lead singer and songwriter for The Cars. This was his second and final release for Reprise Records.

== History ==
Ocasek originally intended for Quick Change World to be a double CD: the "Right Side", consisting of Cars-like pop/rock, and the "Left Side", consisting of experimental music. It would also include a book of Ocasek penned poetry. When Fireball Zone, Ocasek's third solo release, failed to meet sales expectations, Reprise scaled back the project to this fourteen track single disc, which was issued as Quick Change World in North America only.

The seven "Right Side" tracks were produced by Mike Shipley, and the seven "Left Side" tracks were produced by Ocasek. The song "Hard Times" was initially intended for the Cars' album Heartbeat City.

Negative Theater was issued as a 15-track CD in Europe. It includes the seven "Left Side" tracks that were issued on Quick Change World, and eight tracks that are exclusive to the Negative Theater album.

== Track listing ==
All tracks are written by Ric Ocasek.

Right side
No.	Title	Length
1.	"The Big Picture"	1:31
2.	"Don't Let Go"	3:50
3.	"Hard Times"	3:53
4.	"A Little Closer"	4:04
5.	"Riding Shotgun"	4:23
6.	"Feeling's Got to Stay"	4:29
7.	"She's On"	4:14

Left Side
No.	Title	Length
8.	"I Still Believe"	1:28
9.	"Come Alive"	3:51
10.	"Quick Change World"	4:12
11.	"What's on TV"	4:55
12.	"Hopped Up"	5:01
13.	"Help Me Find America"	5:30
14.	"Telephone Again" (hidden bonus track)	0:59
Total length:		50:54

== Personnel ==
- Ric Ocasek – vocals, keyboards, guitars
- Roger Greenawalt – keyboards, guitars, bass
- Greg Hawkes – keyboards
- Eric Schermerhorn – guitars, Ebow guitar
- Darryl Jenifer – bass
- Charlie Pettus – bass
- Milton Sutton – drums

=== Production ===
- Ric Ocasek – producer, engineer, mixing, art direction, design, photography
- Mike Shipley – producer, engineer
- Chris Shaw – mixing
- Mike Baumgartner – assistant engineer
- David Heglmeier – assistant engineer
- George Marino – mastering at Sterling Sound (New York, NY)
- Mick Haggerty – design
- Elliot Roberts for Lookout Management – management
