= New Sheets =

Studio album by Possum Dixon
- Released: 1998
- Studio: Electric Lady (New York City); Chung King "House of Metal" (New York City)
- Genre: Alternative rock
- Length: 43:27
- Label: Interscope
- Producer: Ric Ocasek

Possum Dixon chronology
| Star Maps (1995) | New Sheets (1998) |

Professional ratings
Review scores
| Source | Rating |
|---|---|
| AllMusic | 3/5 stars |
| Spin | 6/10 |

New Sheets is the third and final studio album by the American alternative rock band Possum Dixon. It was released in 1998 on Interscope Records. Many of the songs were co-written by outside musicians, including Jane Wiedlin, Fred Schneider, Dave Stewart, and producer Ric Ocasek.

== Critical reception ==
Stephen Thompson of The A.V. Club wrote that "Ric Ocasek's production stamp is all over New Sheets—it sounds as much like The Cars as any outside project he's produced—which only adds to its glossy appeal." Mark Jenkins of The Washington Post called the album "typical of song-doctored mainstream-rock albums: reliably crafted and uniformly melodic, but a little anonymous." Mark Woodlief of CMJ New Music Monthly wrote, "Rich in '80s-era sheen, New Sheets is mostly crisp and studied in the detached-cool manner Ocasek made popular in his heyday."

== Track listing ==
All lyrics by Rob Zabrecky except 4, by Zabrecky, Fred Schneider, and 11, by Zabrecky, Jane Wiedlin, Pat MacDonald.

1. "Song from a Box" (Rob Zabrecky, Ric Ocasek) – 0:48
2. "Holding (Lenny's Song)" (Zabrecky, Celso Chavez, Byron Reynolds, Matt Devine) – 3:09
3. "Only in the Summertime" (Zabrecky, Chavez, Reynolds, Devine) – 3:12
4. "Firecracker" (Zabrecky, Fred Schneider) – 3:02
5. "New Sheets" (Zabrecky, Chavez, Reynolds, Devine) – 4:43
6. "Always Engines" (Zabrecky, Mark Hudson, Trey Bruce) – 3:05
7. "Stop Breaking Me" (Zabrecky, Chavez, Reynolds, Devine) – 3:43
8. "Now What?" (Zabrecky, Chavez) – 3:46
9. "Plan B" (Zabrecky) – 3:04
10. "Heavenly" (Zabrecky) – 4:03
11. "Faultlines" (Jane Wiedlin, Pat MacDonald, Zabrecky) – 4:06
12. "What You Mean" (Zabrecky, Chavez, Reynolds, Devine) – 2:29
13. "End's Beginning" (Zabrecky, Dave Stewart) – 4:17

== Personnel ==
Credits adapted from CD liner notes.

Possum Dixon

- Rob Zabrecky – vocals, bass guitar, keyboards
- Celso Chavez – guitar, vocals
- Byron Reynolds – "drums and such"

Additional musicians

- Matt Devine – guitars
- Jane Wiedlin – vocals
- Brian Sperber – keyboards
- Ric Ocasek – keyboards

Technical

- Ric Ocasek – producer, mixing
- Brian Sperber – engineer, mixing
- Mike "Bobo" Tocci – second engineer
- George Marino – mastering
- Rachel Gutek – design, layout
- Rob Zabrecky – design, layout
- Storm Hale – band photos
- Carol Sheridan – additional photography
