= Ric Ocasek =

American musician and producer (1944–2019)

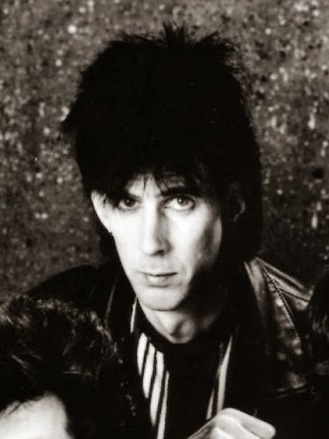
- Ocasek in 1984

Background information
- Born: Richard Theodore Otcasek; March 23, 1944 (Note: Upon Ocasek's death, his age was widely misreported as 70, not 75. In a 1979 interview with Rolling Stone soon after the Cars became popular, he claimed to be 29 rather than his true age of 34, and a false birth year of 1949 was subsequently listed in artist biographies from sources including the Rock and Roll Hall of Fame and Spotify. His New York City voter registration—which was based on voter-provided information that the New York City Board of Elections did not routinely verify—also listed a March 23, 1949, birth date. According to The New York Times, Ocasek stated his true high school graduation year as 1963. The graduation date, together with a preponderance of other government records, indicates that his true birth year was 1944. The Times reported that Ocasek never corrected his age and birth year in later interviews or press releases.); Baltimore, Maryland, U.S.
- Origin: Cleveland, Ohio, U.S.
- Died: September 15, 2019 (aged 75) New York City, U.S.
- Genres: New wave; power pop; pop rock; electronic rock
- Occupations: Musician; singer; songwriter; record producer
- Instruments: Vocals; guitar; keyboards
- Years active: 1963–2019
- Labels: Elektra; Geffen; Reprise; Columbia; Sanctuary
- Formerly of: ID Nirvana; Milkwood; Richard and the Rabbits; The Cars
- Spouses: Constance Campbell (m. 1963; div. 1971); Suzanne Otcasek (m. 1971; div. 1988); Paulina Porizkova (m. 1989; sep. 2017)
- Website: ricocasek.com

Richard Theodore Otcasek (March 23, 1944 – September 15, 2019), known as Ric Ocasek (/oʊˈkæsɪk/ oh-CASS-ik), was an American musician, singer, songwriter, and record producer. He was the co-lead vocalist, rhythm guitarist, songwriter, and frontman for the American new wave band the Cars. In addition to his work with the Cars, Ocasek recorded seven solo studio albums. Ocasek's 1986 single, "Emotion in Motion", was a top 20 hit in the United States.

Ocasek also worked as a record producer for artists such as Bad Religion, Motion City Soundtrack, Suicide, Bad Brains, Weezer, Nada Surf, Guided by Voices and No Doubt. In 2018, he was inducted into the Rock and Roll Hall of Fame as a member of the Cars.

== Early life ==
Ocasek was born on March 23, 1944, in Baltimore. Ocasek was of Czech descent on his father's side, and he grew up Catholic. When he was 16 years old, his father moved the family back to the Otcasek hometown of Cleveland, Ohio, where his father worked as a systems analyst with NASA at the Lewis Research Center. Ocasek graduated from Maple Heights High School in 1963. He briefly attended Antioch College and Bowling Green State University, but dropped out to pursue a career in music.

== Career ==
=== Early career ===
Ocasek met future Cars bassist Benjamin Orr in Cleveland in 1965 after Ocasek saw Orr performing with his band the Grasshoppers on the Big 5 Show, a local musical variety program. He reconnected with Orr a few years later in Columbus, Ohio, and the two began performing in and booking bands together. They formed a band called ID Nirvana in 1968 and performed in and around Ohio State University.

After performing in various bands in Columbus and Ann Arbor, Michigan, Ocasek and Orr relocated to Boston in the early 1970s. There they formed a Crosby, Stills, Nash & Young-style folk rock band called Milkwood. They released one studio album, How's the Weather, on Paramount Records in early 1973 but it failed to chart. Future Cars keyboardist Greg Hawkes played on Milkwood's album. After Milkwood, Ocasek formed the band Richard and the Rabbits, which included Orr and Hawkes. Ocasek and Orr also performed as an acoustic duo during this period. Some of the songs they played became the early Cars songs.

Later, Ocasek and Orr teamed up with guitarist Elliot Easton in the band Cap'n Swing. Cap'n Swing soon came to the attention of WBCN disc jockey (DJ) Maxanne Sartori, who began playing songs from their demo tape on her show. After Cap'n Swing was rejected by several record labels, Ocasek got rid of the bassist and drummer and decided to form a band that better fit his style of writing. Orr took over on bass guitar and David Robinson, best known for his career with the Modern Lovers, became the drummer. Hawkes returned to play keyboards and the band became "the Cars" in late 1976.

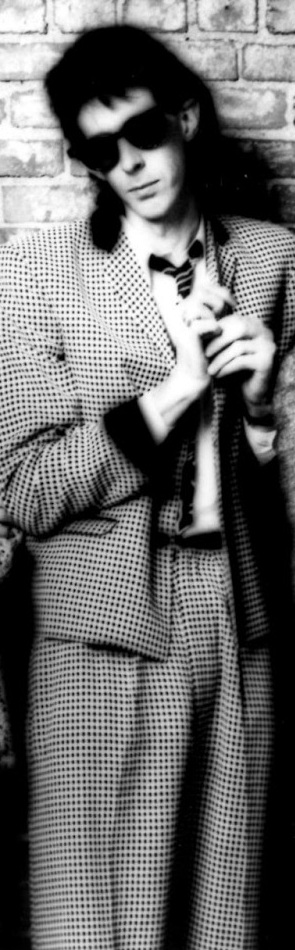
Ocasek in a 1980 Cars publicity photo

=== The Cars ===
Ocasek was a founding member of the Cars, recording numerous hit songs from 1978 to 1988. He played rhythm guitar and sang lead vocals for a majority of songs (bassist Benjamin Orr was lead vocalist on the remaining tracks). Ocasek was the oldest member of the band. After splitting writing duty with Orr in the 1970s, Ocasek became the principal songwriter of the band, and wrote nearly all of the Cars' material, sharing credit on only a few songs with bandmate Greg Hawkes as co-writer. In 2010, Ocasek reunited with the surviving original members of the Cars to record their first studio album in 24 years. The album, entitled Move Like This, was released on May 10, 2011. Not long after the album's release and its supporting tour, however, the Cars resumed their hiatus. The band reunited once again in April 2018 for a performance at the ceremony of their induction into the Rock and Roll Hall of Fame. Ocasek was inducted into the Rock and Roll Hall of Fame as a member of the Cars.

=== Production ===
During his time with the Cars, Ocasek developed a reputation as a record producer, and took this role for many up-and-coming bands of differing genres such as Bad Brains' Rock for Light (1983). His other production credits include Weezer's Blue Album and Green Album (both multi-platinum), Suicide, Romeo Void, Hole, Bebe Buell, No Doubt, Nada Surf, American folk-punk band Black 47, Bad Religion, Johnny Bravo, D Generation, the Wannadies, Possum Dixon, Martin Rev, Jonathan Richman, and the Pink Spiders' second studio album Teenage Graffiti (2006). He also produced a portion of Motion City Soundtrack's third studio album, Even If It Kills Me (2007). In 2014, Ocasek produced Everything Will Be Alright in the End, the ninth studio album by Weezer and his third collaboration with the band, and For All My Sisters, the sixth studio album by the Cribs, which was the final album he produced.

=== Solo career ===
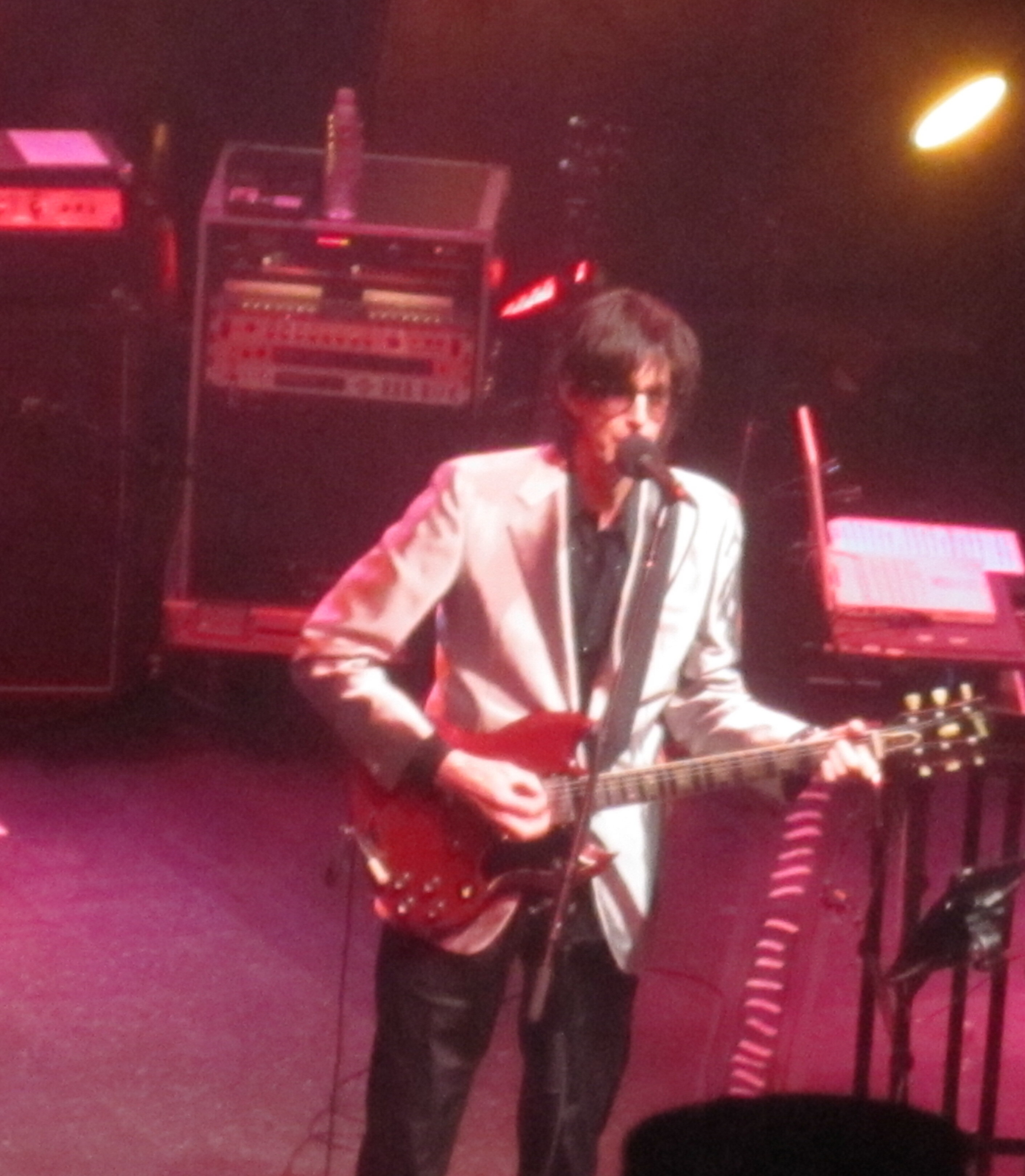
Ocasek performing with the Cars at the Riviera Theatre in Chicago, 2011

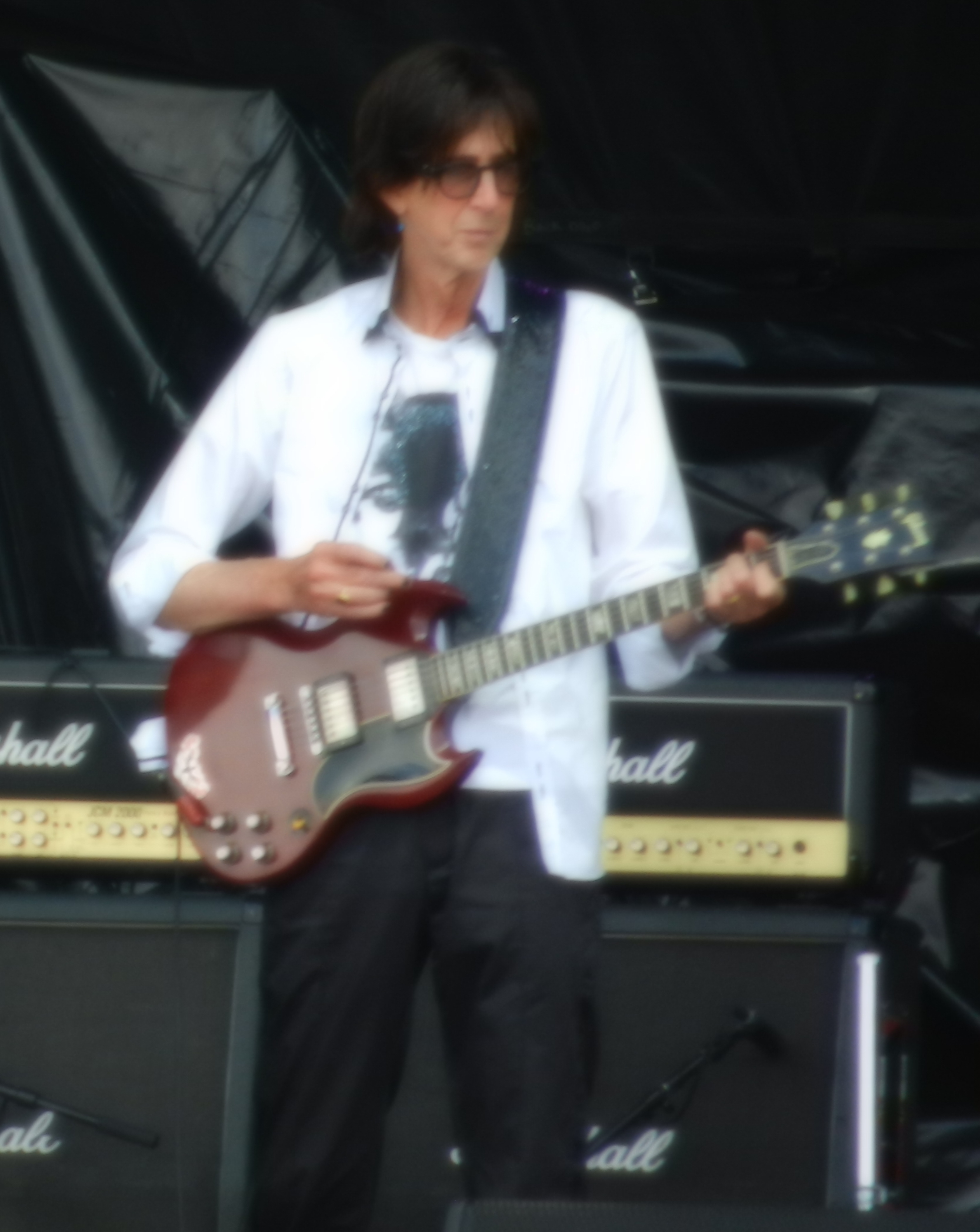
Ocasek performing with the Cars at Lollapalooza in Chicago, 2011

Ocasek released his debut solo studio album in January 1983, Beatitude, which features a more minimal and sparse interpretation of the Cars' new wave rock sound. On some tracks Ocasek played all of the instruments. Greg Hawkes also played on the album, as did Fuzzbee Morse from Richard and the Rabbits. A more synthesizer-heavy follow-up, This Side of Paradise, was released in September 1986; this featured Greg Hawkes, Elliot Easton and Benjamin Orr. A No. 15 hit single, "Emotion in Motion", accompanied the album. In a 1986 interview with the Chicago Tribune, Ocasek said he did not write songs deliberately with the Cars in mind, and he chose to save his "moodier" material for his solo studio albums: "I slant my solo albums so that they have a few songs that the Cars really couldn't do. Weirder songs. More poetic."

The Cars disbanded in 1988, and Ocasek disappeared from the public eye for a couple of years. He resurfaced in 1991 with his third solo studio album, Fireball Zone. One track, "Rockaway", enjoyed a brief stay on the charts, but his solo albums realized disappointing sales, especially compared to his success with the Cars. He subsequently released other solo works during the decade, including 1993's Quick Change World, 1996's Getchertiktz (a collaboration with Suicide's Alan Vega and Canadian poet Gillian McCain comprising only Beat Generation poetry set to music, sound effects, etc.), and 1997's Billy Corgan-produced Troublizing (which Ocasek supported with a very brief tour, his first since leaving the Cars). In September 2005, Ocasek released his seventh and final studio album, Nexterday, to little fanfare, but it received positive reviews.

== In other media ==
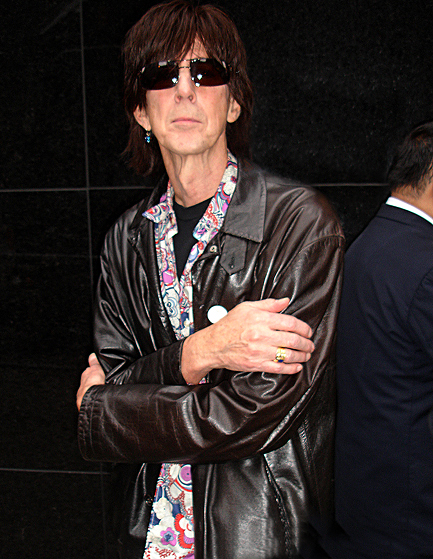
Ocasek in Theater District, Manhattan, New York City, 2009

Ocasek wrote a book of poetry in 1993 titled Negative Theatre. It was at one time expected to be incorporated into an album and multimedia incarnation of the same name, but those plans were dropped abruptly. For many years Ocasek had a hobby of making drawings, photo collages, and mixed-media art works which, in 2009, were shown at a gallery in Columbus, Ohio, as an exhibition called "Teahead Scraps".

Ocasek had a cameo appearance as a beatnik painter in the John Waters musical comedy film Hairspray (1988), and had a small part in the romantic fantasy comedy film Made in Heaven (1987) in which he played a mechanic.

Ocasek stated in a 2005 interview in Rockline that he hated touring and was unlikely to do so again. He also stated he would not be reuniting with the Cars again, but gave the okay to his former bandmates to do so, with Todd Rundgren replacing him on vocals, using the name the New Cars.

On April 17, 2006, Ocasek appeared on The Colbert Report and volunteered to put Todd Rundgren "on notice". He appeared again on the July 26, 2006, episode to cheers from the audience as he volunteered to lead a commando mission to "rescue" Stephen Jr., the baby eagle at the San Francisco Zoo named after Stephen Colbert. He also appeared again on April 18, 2007, in order to support his wife during her appearance on the show, after remarks that she found Colbert "extremely attractive". He has been mentioned many times in other episodes as well. The Cars, with Ocasek, appeared on The Colbert Report on August 9, 2011, to promote their seventh and final studio album, Move Like This.

In 2012, Ocasek released Lyrics and Prose, a complete collection of lyrics from his solo and Cars' albums. The book also contains prose and poetry never set to music, as well as previously unpublished photographs and artwork.

== Personal life ==
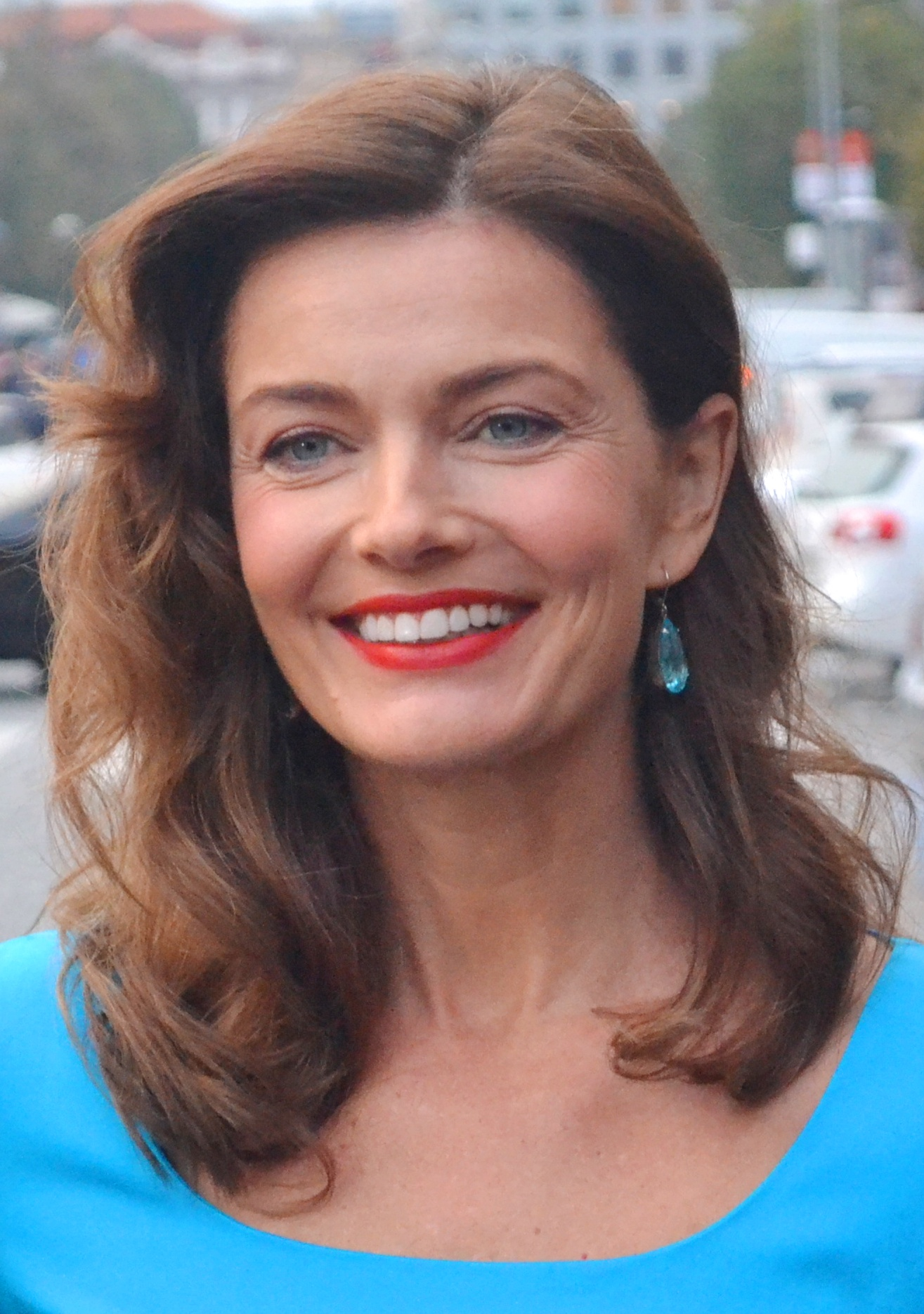
Ocasek's then-wife Paulina Porizkova in 2014

Ocasek and Cars co-founder Benjamin Orr were close friends who became estranged when the band broke up. The two reconciled prior to Orr's death in 2000. Their friendship was commemorated in the 2005 solo song "Silver", which Ocasek wrote in memory of Orr.

Ocasek was married three times. His first wife Constance divorced him in Ohio in 1971. In the same year he married Suzanne Otcasek, who used the original spelling of Ocasek's name. They were married for 17 years. During filming of the music video for the Cars' song "Drive" in 1984, Ocasek met 19-year-old Czech-born supermodel Paulina Porizkova, while he was still married to Suzanne. Ocasek and Suzanne divorced in 1988. He and Porizkova were married on August 23, 1989 on Saint-Barthélemy island. In May 2018, Porizkova announced she and Ocasek had separated a year earlier.

Ocasek had six sons, two from each of his three marriages. His eldest son, Christopher (b. 1964), is a singer who formed the short-lived rock band Glamour Camp, which released one studio album in 1989, and appeared as a solo artist on the soundtrack to the film Pretty Woman (1990).

== Death ==
Ocasek was found dead on September 15, 2019, by his estranged wife, Paulina Porizkova, at his New York City townhouse, which they still shared following their separation in 2017. He had been recovering from surgery. In a November 2022 appearance on the Facebook Watch talk show Red Table Talk, Porizkova stated that the surgery was due to lung cancer. The Office of Chief Medical Examiner of the City of New York (OCME) reported that Ocasek had died from natural causes. He suffered from both hypertensive heart and coronary artery disease.

Ocasek is buried at Nine Partners Cemetery in Millbrook, New York.

Porizkova and Ocasek were still in the process of their divorce at the time of his death, but he had disinherited her in a new will, alleging that before his recent surgery she had abandoned him. This required a probate court judge to rule on the veracity of the abandonment claims before the remaining estate could be divided. He also disinherited two of his six sons.

In 2021, the dispute between Ocasek's estate and Porizkova was settled; Porizkova said she was granted a third of his estate. While Porizkova would not tell Vanity Fair the precise terms of the settlement, she denied reports that Ocasek was "only worth $5 million" at the time of his death.

== Discography ==
=== Solo albums ===
- Beatitude (1983) – US No. 28
- This Side of Paradise (1986) – US No. 31 AUS No. 24
- Fireball Zone (1991)
- Quick Change World (1993)
- Negative Theater (1993) (Europe only)
- Troublizing (1997)
- Nexterday (2005)

=== Spoken word albums ===
- Getchertiktz with Alan Vega and Gillian McCain (1996)

=== With the Cars ===
- The Cars (1978)
- Candy-O (1979)
- Panorama (1980)
- Shake It Up (1981)
- Heartbeat City (1984)
- Door to Door (1987)
- Move Like This (2011)

=== Solo singles ===
| Title | Release | Peak chart positions | | | | | | | Album |
| Title | Release | US | US Rock | US AC | US Dance | AUS | CAN | NZ | Album |
|---|---|---|---|---|---|---|---|---|---|
| "Something to Grab For" | 1983 | 47 | 5 | — | — | — | — | — | Beatitude |
| "Jimmy Jimmy" | 1983 | — | 25 | — | 60 | — | — | — | Beatitude |
| "Connect Up to Me" | 1983 | — | — | — | 37 | — | — | — | Beatitude |
| "Emotion in Motion" | 1986 | 15 | 1 | 8 | — | 8 | 18 | 35 | This Side of Paradise |
| "True to You" | 1986 | 75 | 9 | — | — | 100 | — | — | This Side of Paradise |
| "Rockaway" | 1991 | — | 11 | — | — | 139 | 46 | — | Fireball Zone |
"—" denotes a recording that did not chart or was not released in that territory.

=== Guest appearances ===
| Title | Release | Album |
|---|---|---|
| "Steal the Night" | 1983 | The King of Comedy |
| "I Still Want You" | 1987 | Made in Heaven |
| "Zip-a-Dee-Doo-Dah" | 1991 | Simply Mad About the Mouse: A Musical Celebration of Imagination |
| "Crash" | 1994 | Speed |

=== Production credits ===
- Suicide – Suicide: Alan Vega and Martin Rev (1980)
- Ric Ocasek – Beatitude (1982)
- Romeo Void – Benefactor (1982)
- Bad Brains – Rock for Light (1983)
- Alan Vega – Saturn Strip (1983)
- The Cars – Heartbeat City (1984)
- Lloyd Cole and the Commotions – Rattlesnakes (1984; Remixed three songs for U.S. release)
- Ric Ocasek – This Side of Paradise (1986)
- The Cars – Door to Door (1987)
- Patty Smyth – "I Run Right Back" from Caddyshack II (1988)
- Suicide – A Way of Life (1988)
- Ric Ocasek – Fireball Zone (1991)
- Suicide – Why Be Blue (1992)
- Ric Ocasek – Quick Change World (1993)
- Ric Ocasek – Negative Theater (1993)
- Black 47 – Fire of Freedom (1993)
- Alan Vega – New Raceion (1993)
- Weezer – Weezer (Blue Album) (1994)
- Bad Brains – God of Love (1995)
- Bad Religion – The Gray Race (1996)
- Nada Surf – High/Low (1996)
- Ric Ocasek – Troublizing (1997)
- D Generation – No Lunch (1998)
- Jonathan Richman – I'm So Confused (1998)
- Possum Dixon – New Sheets (1998)
- Guided by Voices – Do the Collapse (1999)
- The Wannadies – Yeah (1999)
- Weezer – Weezer (Green Album) (2001)
- No Doubt – Rock Steady (2001; tracks "Don't Let Me Down" and "Platinum Blonde Life")
- Le Tigre – This Island (2004)
- Ric Ocasek – Nexterday (2005)
- Brazilian Girls – Talk to La Bomb (2006; track "Last Call")
- The Pink Spiders – Teenage Graffiti (2006)
- Motion City Soundtrack – Even If It Kills Me (2007; Five tracks)
- Shwayze – Let It Beat (2009; track "Crazy for You")
- Weezer – Everything Will Be Alright in the End (2014)
- The Cribs – For All My Sisters (2015)
