= Sweat It Out (album) =

Studio album by The Pink Spiders
- Released: September 23, 2008
- Label: Mean Buzz Records / Adrenaline Music

The Pink Spiders chronology
Teenage Graffiti (2006)	Sweat It Out (2008)	Mutations (2018)

Singles from Sweat It Out
- 1. "Gimme Chemicals" Released: August 26, 2008

Professional ratings
Review scores
Source	Rating
AllMusic	2.5/5 stars

Sweat It Out is the fourth release by the band The Pink Spiders. The album was made available on September 23, 2008, through Mean Buzz Records/Adrenaline Music.

== Track listing ==
1. "Busy Signals" - 3:10
2. "Gimme Chemicals" - 3:29
3. "Seventeen Candles" - 3:14
4. "Falling with Every Step" - 4:19
5. "Truth or Dare" - 3:02
6. "Don't Wait for Me" - 3:54
7. "Stranglehold" - 3:09
8. "Settling for You" - 3:23
9. "Please Maria" - 3:47
10. "Sleeping on the Floor" - 2:54
11. "Trust No One" - 2:44
12. "Here Comes Trouble" - 2:44
13. "Mrs. Ruston" - 4:17

Adrenaline Music Group store digital download EP bonus tracks

- "Teenage Graffiti"
- "Knock Knock"
- "We Do It All the Time"
- "Typical Danger"
- "Don't Wait for Me (acoustic)"
