= Hot Pink (The Pink Spiders album) =

Studio album by The Pink Spiders
- Released: 4 January 2005
- Recorded: 2004
- Genre: Pop punk
- Length: 29:53
- Label: CI Records (CD); Spat! Records (Vinyl)
- Producer: The Pink Spiders

The Pink Spiders chronology
The Pink Spiders are Taking Over! (2004)	Hot Pink (2005)	Teenage Graffiti (2006)

Professional ratings
Review scores
Source	Rating
AllMusic	3/5 stars

Hot Pink is the debut studio album by American band the Pink Spiders, released in 2005.

== Track listing ==
All tracks are written by Matt Friction.

No.	Title	Length
1.	"Stereo Speakers"	2:35
2.	"Teenage Graffiti"	2:19
3.	"Knock Knock"	2:19
4.	"Sham On"	2:07
5.	"Going Steady"	1:40
6.	"Hollywood Fix"	2:29
7.	"Modern Swinger"	3:04
8.	"Talk Hard"	2:57
9.	"Chicago Overcoat"	2:37
10.	"Little Razorblade"	4:11
11.	"Soft Smoke"	3:33

Vinyl Edition
No.	Title	Length
11.	"The Chase"	2:25
