= This Side of Paradise (album) =

Studio album by Ric Ocasek
- Released: September 13, 1986
- Studio: Electric Lady Studios (New York City, New York); Additional recording at The Wool Hall (Beckington, England) and The Town House (London, England)
- Genre: Pop rock
- Length: 50:12
- Label: Geffen
- Producer: Ric Ocasek; Chris Hughes; Ross Cullum

Ric Ocasek chronology
Beatitude (1983)	This Side of Paradise (1986)	Fireball Zone (1991)

Singles from This Side of Paradise
- 1. "Emotion in Motion" Released: 1986; 2. "True to You" Released: 1986

Professional ratings
Review scores
Source	Rating
AllMusic	3/5 stars
Kerrang!	3/5 stars
Rolling Stone	(Mixed)

This Side of Paradise is the second solo studio album by Ric Ocasek, primary vocalist, rhythm guitarist, songwriter, and frontman for the American new wave band of the Cars. It was released on September 13, 1986, by Geffen Records. Though it was a solo album, other members of the Cars played significant roles. Greg Hawkes plays keyboards and bass throughout the album (he appears on most of Ocasek's solo albums), and also co-wrote "Hello Darkness" (most Cars albums feature one Ocasek/Hawkes tune). Benjamin Orr provided backing vocals for three songs. Along with Hawkes and Orr, the track "True to You" also features Elliot Easton on guitar. Both production and drumming were handled by Chris Hughes (formerly known as "Merrick", drummer for Adam and the Ants). Hughes had been the recent producer of Tears for Fears most popular two studio albums. Steve Stevens from Billy Idol's backing band plays guitar on over half of the album.

In addition, Roland Orzabal from Tears for Fears (guitar on "Emotion in Motion"), Tony Levin from King Crimson and Peter Gabriel, Tom Verlaine of Television and G. E. Smith of the Saturday Night Live Band guest on various tracks.

The first single from the album, "Emotion in Motion", which was aided in its promotion by a music video that received heavy airplay on MTV, reached number 1 on the U.S. Mainstream Rock Tracks chart for one week, becoming Ocasek's only solo chart-topper (as a member of the Cars, he topped the chart with the singles "You Might Think" and "Magic" in 1984, and "Tonight She Comes" in 1985). Ocasek remains the only member of the Cars to have a number 1 hit single. The music video for "True to You" also received a fair amount of MTV airplay in late 1986.

== Promotion ==
Guitarist G. E. Smith's involvement with the album proved convenient when Ocasek assembled a backing band (including Greg Hawkes on keyboards) to appear as musical guest on Saturday Night Live (SNL), mostly using the Saturday Night Live Band, which then featured Smith as bandleader. Appearing on Episode 3 of Season 12, Ocasek performed "Emotion in Motion" and "Keep on Laughin'". Ocasek also appeared in a comedy sketch starring Dana Carvey's recurring character The Church Lady, who incorrectly introduced him as Keith Richards. After Ocasek corrected her, she then addressed him as "Ricky". In her typical way, The Church Lady piously criticized the sensuality of his music.

== Title ==
This is the second consecutive Ocasek album to derive its title from an indirect poetry reference. In this case, This Side of Paradise shares its title with 1920 debut novel of F. Scott Fitzgerald, which in turn took its title from a line of the Rupert Brooke poem "Tiare Tahiti".

== Song details ==
The album begins with sound effects from the shoot 'em up video game Missile Command (1980), a woman's voice speaking French, and the musical theme of "Look in Your Eyes", before "Keep on Laughin'" begins.

"Coming for You" features a recurring motif previously heard on "Nightspots" from the Cars' second studio album Candy-O (1979): Under an E minor chord, B-C-B-A-E.

"True Love" features a classical-styled solo on nylon-stringed acoustic guitar, played by Steve Stevens, who was then better known for the bombastic electric style that he brought to Billy Idol's material.

"P.F.J." is a character sketch of a young man called "Pink Flag Joe". It features Greg Hawkes on clarinet and harmonica, as well as keyboards and bass.

The second chorus to "Hello Darkness", beginning with "Hello darkness / You are my friend", could be a reference to the well-known Simon & Garfunkel 1964 song "The Sound of Silence", which begins "Hello darkness, my old friend". Ocasek has long had a habit of using well-known titles and lyrical references, such as the Cars' songs "Good Times Roll", "Bye Bye Love", "Think It Over" and "Maybe Baby", among others.

Before the last song, the title track, has quite faded away, it abruptly switches to an instrumental, synthesizer-dominated reprise of "True Love", which gradually fades out to end the album.

== Track listing ==
All tracks are written by Ric Ocasek, except where noted.

Side one
No.	Title	Length
1.	"Keep on Laughin'"	4:36
2.	"True to You"	3:59
3.	"Emotion in Motion"	4:41
4.	"Look in Your Eyes"	6:00
5.	"Coming for You"	5:34

Side two
No.	Title	Writer(s)	Length
6.	"Mystery"		4:20
7.	"True Love"		4:23
8.	"P.F.J."		3:39
9.	"Hello Darkness"	Ric Ocasek; Greg Hawkes	4:52
10.	"This Side of Paradise"		8:04
Total length:			50:12

== Personnel ==
=== Musicians ===
- Ric Ocasek – vocals, guitars (1–8, 10), backing vocals (7), keyboards (10)
- Andy Topeka – Synclavier, computer programming
- Greg Hawkes – keyboards, bass, backing vocals (2, 7), clarinet (8), harmonica (8)
- Steve Stevens – guitars (1, 4, 5, 7, 9, 10)
- Elliot Easton – guitars (2)
- Roland Orzabal – guitars (3)
- G. E. Smith – guitars (6), additional guitars (8)
- Tom Verlaine – guitars (8)
- Tony Levin – Chapman Stick (5)
- Chris Hughes – drums
- Benjamin Orr – backing vocals (2, 4, 7)
- Sandy McLelland – backing vocals (3)

=== Production ===
- Ric Ocasek – producer, additional Polaroids
- Chris Hughes – producer
- Ross Cullum – producer, engineer
- Joe Barbaria – mix engineer
- Jamie Chaleff – assistant engineer
- David Heglmeier – assistant engineer
- Ken Steiger – assistant engineer
- Andy Topeka – technical maintenance
- Bob Ludwig – mastering at Masterdisk (Peekskill, New York)
- Nick Egan – cover and sleeve design
- Arthur Eigort – photography
- Elliot Roberts and Jeffrey Kramer for Lookout Management – management

== Charts ==
Chart performance for This Side of Paradise
Chart (1986)	Peak position
Australian Albums (Kent Music Report)	24
New Zealand Albums (RMNZ)	50
Swedish Albums (Sverigetopplistan)	42
US Billboard 200	31

== Use in EarthBound ==
The intro to the track "Keep on Laughin'" was sampled in the SNES video game EarthBound (1994). It was used in the background music for Moonside.
