= Possum Dixon (album) =

Studio album by Possum Dixon
- Released: 1993
- Studio: 23 North; Mankey Business
- Length: 31:41
- Label: Interscope
- Producer: Earle Mankey, Possum Dixon

Possum Dixon chronology
Apartment Music (1992)	Possum Dixon (1993)	Sunshine or Noir? (1995)

Possum Dixon is the debut album by the American band Possum Dixon, released in 1993. The first single, "Watch the Girl Destroy Me", was a minor hit.

The band promoted the album by touring with the Dead Milkmen and Violent Femmes, among others. The album had sold more than 31,000 copies by the end of the 1990s.

== Production ==
The album was produced by Earle Mankey and Possum Dixon, with Mankey encouraging the band to use older instruments in the studio. Some songs from the band's early releases were rerecorded for Possum Dixon.

Robert Levine noted in the Los Angeles Times that the album contained "dark tales of everyday life in the working world with a hard-hitting power-pop sound that makes the edgy frustration catchy." "Nerves" is about low-paying work, while "Executive Slacks" is about bosses. All of the songs were written by frontman Rob Zabrecky, on his own or with other members of the band.

== Critical reception ==
Professional ratings
Review scores
Source	Rating
AllMusic	4/5 stars
Calgary Herald	B+
The Encyclopedia of Popular Music	3/5 stars
The Indianapolis Star	3.5/4 stars
MusicHound Rock: The Essential Album Guide	2.5/5 stars
The Tampa Tribune	2.5/4 stars

In Trouser Press, Robert Levine wrote that, though Zabrecky "sometimes takes his twentysomething angst too seriously, 'Nerves' and other numbers do a fair job of capturing what it's like to be young, poor and alienated in the City of Angels." Steve Hochman of the Los Angeles Times opined, "Throw skinny ties on these guys and it'd be just a tad too close to new-wave redux," but admired "the propulsive energy" of the album. Alex Hecht of the Houston Press deemed the album "catchy party rock music with nerdy vocals telling funny stories about girls and other nervous habits."

Mark Jenkins of The Washington Post determined that "songs such as 'In Buildings' and 'She Drives', in which singer, bassist and songwriter Robert Zabrecky tempers his attitude and record-collector erudition with a solid melody and a steady beat, are as rollicking as the work of much dumber bands." James Muretich of the Calgary Herald praised the "punkish energy [and] irreverence." Scott Bacon of The Indianapolis Star stated that the guitarists shuffle "easily through a diversity of styles—be it ska, surf or just good ol' jangly guitar rock."

== Track listing ==
No.	Title	Writer(s)	Length
1.	"Nerves"	Robert Zabrecky	2:27
2.	"In Buildings"	Zabrecky	2:47
3.	"Watch the Girl Destroy Me"	Zabrecky	3:43
4.	"She Drives"	Zabrecky, Robert O'Sullivan	2:21
5.	"We're All Happy"	Possum Dixon	2:35
6.	"Invisible"	Zabrecky	5:34
7.	"Pharmaceutical Itch"	Possum Dixon	3:22
8.	"Executive Slacks"	Zabrecky, O'Sullivan	2:16
9.	"Regina"	Zabrecky, O'Sullivan	2:29
10.	"John Struck Lucy"	Zabrecky, O'Sullivan	0:53
11.	"Elevators"	Zabrecky, Celso Chavez, O'Sullivan	3:06

== Personnel ==
Credits adapted from CD liner notes.

Possum Dixon

- Robert Zabrecky – singer, bass guitar
- Robert O'Sullivan – guitar, piano, back-up vocals, harmonica
- Celso Chavez – guitar
- Richard Treuel – drums

Technical

- Earle Mankey – producer, mixing
- Possum Dixon – producer
- Chuck Reed – associate producer, mixing
- Phil Kaffel – engineer, mixing
- Jeff Sheehan – assistant engineer
- Liz Sroka – assistant engineer
- Stephen Marcussen – mastering
- Kim Holt – art direction, design
- Robert Zabrecky – art direction, design
- Arian Helm – live photos
- Darrin Paskal – back photo
