= Possum Dixon =

American rock band

- Possum Dixon in 1993. From left to right: Chavez, Truel, O'Sullivan and Zabrecky

Background information
- Origin: Los Angeles, California, U.S.
- Genre: Alternative rock
- Years active: 1989–1999
- Label: Interscope
- Past members: Rob Zabrecky; Celso Chavez; Robert O'Sullivan; Rich Truel; Byron Reynolds; Steve P

Possum Dixon was an American rock band, which existed between 1989 and 1999. Fronted by singer-songwriter and bassist Rob Zabrecky, the group's neo-new wave pop and post punk style first appeared among a string of early independently released 7 inch singles and on their self-titled debut on Interscope Records in 1993. Zabrecky's lyrical content often described love lost and slacker life in Los Angeles.

== History ==
Formed in 1989 by college and high school friends Zabrecky and Celso Chavez, the group took their name from a suspected murderer mentioned on television show America's Most Wanted. Initially performing as a duo, they mixed haphazard punk-folk compositions with store-front theatre to some measurable success, primarily performing at LA art/coffeehouses (Bebop Records & Fine Art, Jabberjaw, Pik-Me-Up). The following year, longtime friends and former schoolmates Robert O’Sullivan (guitar/organ/keyboards) and Rich Truel (drums) were enlisted and together a fuller musical range was explored. Chronicling their hometown's east side slacker life with a pop-rock sensibility, the band incorporated influences from Talking Heads, Human Hands, Wall of Voodoo, Dream Syndicate and Camper Van Beethoven.

By 1992 Possum Dixon had logged a number of mini-tours and produced a number self-released 7 inch singles and cassettes which included "Music for a One Bedroom Apartment", "Nerves", "Watch the Girl Destroy Me", and a three single box-set released by Pronto Records. Along the way a strong following was built and eventually the band found themselves part of a flowering art-infused, indie and coffeehouse scene in Los Angeles.

Secretly rehearsing by night in a warehouse (where Zabrecky worked as a mailroom clerk by day), hiding their equipment with boxes when they finished, the band diligently polished club-tested material and assembled what would become their first full length major label debut. The band had a helping hand from Beck, who would frequently get up on stage before the band played to test his latest material. Zabrecky later recorded a bass track on Beck's first Geffen release, Mellow Gold.

In 1993 the band signed to Interscope Records, based on the strength of their live performances and briefcase of club proven material. They sought the record producer Earle Mankey, and when the album was released, radio stations picked up "Watch the Girl Destroy Me". Aided by a steady flow of both radio airplay and MTV airplay (the song's hit video), the track hit No. 9 on the Modern Rock Tracks chart in the U.S.

Spin magazine remarked:

"Zabrecky's new wave-noir vignettes are littered with overheard conversations, chattering radios, lucky numbers, and visitors from other planets - the markings of one man's attempt to make some sense out of postmodern chaos."

The band embarked on a tour schedule throughout the United States and Europe, headlining and supporting groups such as the Dead Milkmen, The Lemonheads, Reverend Horton Heat, and Violent Femmes.

During the sessions, the band replaced drummer Rich Truel with Byron Reynolds, who had served a brief tenure on drums prior to Truel. The band chose Boston producer Tim O'Heir (Sebadoh, Folk Implosion, Superdrag) to capture the band's dark, moody, new wave-ish emotions. The LP was an array of influences of 1970s power pop to no-wave chaos, and again the critics were positive. Raygun magazine described the group as "a rough-yet polished band whose anguished pop songs and intelligent, esoteric lyrics are love themes for the dysfunctional 90s."

After a touring schedule, the band released two EPs: Sunshine or Noir and Tropic of Celso. They also contributed a song to 1997's We Are Not DEVO cover album. Around this time Robert O'Sullivan quit to pursue other interests.

What was to be their third and final effort, New Sheets, was released in 1998. During the process, the band enlisted the help of longtime friend and guitarist Matt Devine, and the production of The Cars singer-songwriter Ric Ocasek, who found clarity in a clean and sober Zabrecky. Go-Go's guitarist Jane Wiedlin also provided backup on the song "Faultlines." Ultimately this produced an album that was more The Cars than Possum Dixon, and overshadowed what the group was best known for. Following the release, the group broke up.

Founding guitarist Celso Chavez died on May 9, 2012, due to complications from pneumonia.

== Discography ==
=== Studio albums ===
- Possum Dixon (1993, Interscope)
- Star Maps (1996, Interscope)
- New Sheets (1998, Interscope)

=== EPs ===
- Possum Dixon (1991) (self-released)
- Music for a One Bedroom Apartment (1992, Pronto Records) (box set of three 45 RPM singles)
- Sunshine or Noir (1996, Interscope)
- A Tropic of Celso (1996, Interscope)

== Band lineup ==
- Rob Zabrecky: vocals, bass guitar, double bass (1989–1998)
- Celso Chavez: guitar, vocals (1989–1998, died 2012)
- Robert O'Sullivan: guitar, keyboards (1990–1997)
- Rich Truel: drums (1990, 1992–1995)
- Byron Reynolds: drums (1991, 1995–1998)
- Steve P: drums (1992)

== Awards ==
- 1999 LA Weekly Award for Best Pop/Rock Band
- 1999 California Music Awards
