= Fuzzbee Morse =

American composer for films

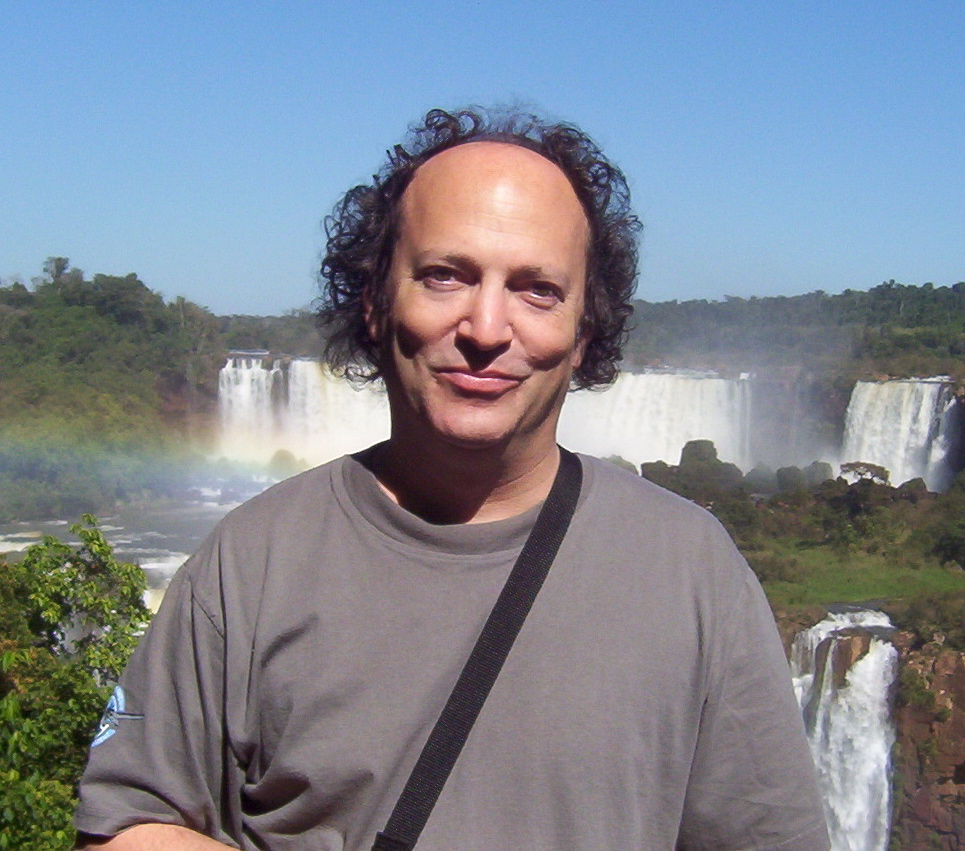
- Known for: Multi-instrumentalist

Fuzzbee Morse is an American composer for films, as well as a singer/songwriter, multi-instrumentalist, and music producer.

He is known for his command of a variety of instruments, including guitar, keyboards, bass, flute, soprano saxophone, mandolin, alto flute and many others. As a player, primarily on guitar, Fuzzbee has played with such notable musicians as: Bono, Peter Gabriel, Lou Reed, Frank Zappa, Aaron Neville, Wasis Diop, Jaco Pastorius, Third World, Karla Bonoff, Richie Havens, Pino Palladino, Alex Band (The Calling), Jean-Luc Ponty, Ric Ocasek, Joan Baez, Cyril Neville, Axl Rose, The Chambers Brothers, Manu Katché, Nick Jameson, Robert Wyatt, Greg Hawkes, Paul Allen, Pink, Dave Grohl, Larry Mullen, Jr., The Soul Survivors, Daniel Lanois, Donovan, Jimmy Vivino, Anne McCue, Jerry Marotta, Tony Levin, Jesse Colin Young, Derek Trucks, Susan Tedeschi, Julian Lennon, Vernon Reid, Rufus Wainwright, Robert Randolph, Steve Ferrone, Kenny Edwards, John Sebastian, Bernard Fowler, Andy Pratt, David Sancious, Freebo, Natalie Cole, Lee Sklar, Ben Orr, Nick Mason, Russ Kunkel, Robbie Robertson, Rocky Dawuni, Chris Stamey, Phil Upchurch, that dog, The Security Project, Dan Aykroyd, Kenny Wayne Shepherd, Trey Gunn, Harry Dean Stanton and many more.

His first album, Dreams and Other Living Things, featuring Jerry Marotta, Tony Levin, David Sancious, Lisa Frazier, Daya Rawat and The Chambers Brothers was released in 2015. Paul Zollo, Senior Editor of American Songwriter reviewed it as "An absolute masterpiece. An album for the ages."

His film career began in 1987 with the Stuart Gordon film, Dolls, and he is still active in the industry today. He has worked on films with people such as Philip Haas, Damian Lewis, Stuart Gordon, John Slattery, Will Gluck, Richard Band, Charles Band, Chris Bauer, Tom Stern, Pam Brady, Dyan Cannon, Currie Graham, Sasha Jenson, Michael Couto and Kyle McCulloch. Morse, despite having many titles to his name, is often credited alongside others such as Richard Band, etc. and therefore hasn't always had as much attention from the media as his collaborators. Dolls is known for having sparked off several 'Killer Doll' franchises (collections of films such as Chucky and the Puppetmaster series with their many sequels), along with Ghoulies II, the second in a series of four films about wild, little demons conjured with black magic. Morse is still working in music, film, and television.

== Performance Groups ==
Morse performs often in the Los Angeles area. He is in The Flying Fannoli Brothers, an acclaimed improv comedy band, along with Nick Jameson and Gary Anthony Williams since 1998. He's also performed with long-running comedy troupe Off the Wall and with comedians and improv actors including Rick Overton, Paul Dooley, Paul Willson, Ryan Stiles, and Dan Aykroyd.

The Flying Fannoli Brothers appeared at the fourth Big Stinkin' International Improv & Sketch Comedy Festival in Austin in 1999.

Morse plays guitar and flute in The Tribe, a revolving group of Los Angeles musicians and singers that includes Stephen John Kalinich, Freebo, Gary Stockdale, Grant Geissman, Rob Morrow, Micky Dolenz, Carly Smithson, Rosemary Butler, Marc Mann, Blondie Chaplin, Don Randi, Gary Griffin, The Honeys, and Band Manager Lauri Reimer.

== Credited works as Composer ==
- "Gerhard Reinke's Wanderlust" (2003) TV series
- Angels Crest (2002)
- Mr. Wong (2000)
- Harmony Lane (1996)
- Huntress: Spirit of the Night (1995)
- Dark Angel: The Ascent (1994) (V)
- Evolution (1989)
- Ghoulies II (1987)
- Dolls (1987)

== Soundtracks ==
- Fired Up (2009) (writer: "Feeling So Gay") (performer: "Feeling So Gay")
- "The Loop" (2 episodes, 2006-2007: Fatty (2007) TV episode (writer: "Feelin' So Gay") (performer: "Feelin' So Gay"); The Tiger Express (2006) TV episode (writer: "I Wished I Were a Moleman Too") (performer: "I Wished I Were a Moleman Too")
- The Situation (2006) (writer: "Kiss My Ass!", "Giant Lizard") (performer: "Kiss My Ass!", "Giant Lizard")
- Peacock Blues (1996) (TV) (writer: "Should I?", "Keep Talking") (performer: "Should I?", "Keep Talking")
- Prehysteria! 2 (1994) (V) (writer: "I Chopped the Chicken", "The Food I Cook", "The Lamb Sautées Tonight", "Dino Hop") (performer: "Dino Hop")
- The Arrival (1991) ("Danger Man")
- The End of Innocence (1990) (writer: "The Beat is in the Blood") (performer: "The Beat is in the Blood")

== Other credits ==
- Fish Without a Bicycle (2003) (composer: song "Take Hold of Me")
- Talisman (1998) (music licensing)
- Ghost Town (1988) (music licensing)
