= The Pink Spiders =

American rock band

- Origin: Nashville, Tennessee, U.S.
- Genres: Garage rock; pop punk; indie rock
- Years active: 2003–2009; 2010–present
- Labels: Spat! Records; CI; Geffen; Suretone; Mean Buzz Records; Pure Noise
- Members: Matt Friction; JoCo; Joey B-Side; Young James
- Past members: Bob Ferrari; Jon Decious; Brandon Jazz; Jamie Mechan; Dave Paulson; Clarke Corwin; Nathan Hansen; Nick Slack; Raf Cevallos; Jeffrey Nash
- Website: thepinkspiders.com

The Pink Spiders are an American rock band, formed in Nashville, Tennessee in 2003. The band consists of Matt Friction (lead vocals, guitar), JoCo (bass), Joey B-Side (drums), and Young James (guitar).

Matt Friction and original drummer, Bob Ferrari, recruited Jon Decious (bass) and released their first EP, The Pink Spiders Are Taking Over!, in 2004. The group toured around the Nashville area and an independent label released their debut album, Hot Pink in 2005.

The Pink Spiders performed at The Viper Room in West Hollywood on March 2, 2005, after which they were signed by Geffen Records. Their major-label debut, Teenage Graffiti was produced by Ric Ocasek and released in 2006. Promotion and the single "Little Razorblade" landed Teenage Graffiti on the Billboard 200. The group also made several television appearances and played at the Vans Warped Tour.

The relationship between the group and Geffen faltered during the making of their album, Sweat It Out, disagreements led Decious and Ferrari to leave the band shortly after the album's release. Sweat It Out was released through Adrenaline Music and Friction's Mean Buzz Records in September 2008. The Pink Spiders went on hiatus in 2009, and all three members pursued other musical projects.

Friction, Decious, and Ferrari eventually reunited and performed at The Viper Room in June 2010; Friction officially announced their return. The group released a two-track single and completed the "2 Legit 2 Quit Tour" in 2011. In August 2016, the band performed a sold-out show at the Mercy Lounge in Nashville, TN, to celebrate the tenth anniversary of their Geffen Records release, Teenage Graffiti. A fourth full-length LP, Mutations, was released on July 31, 2018, followed by several US headlining tours.

== History ==
=== Origins of the group (2003–2004) ===
In 2003, Matthew Bell (known as "Matt Friction") led the Nashville quartet, Silent Friction, and performed around the Nashville area. He occasionally filled in on guitar for Oliver's Army, where Robert William Fort V (known as "Bob Ferrari") played drums.

Friction and Ferrari decided to make music together. They recruited Jon Decious on bass and a second guitarist, Jamie Mechan. Mechan was eventually dismissed from the group. The trio contemplated several names, including "The Pink Tigers" and "The Pink Diablos". They settled on "The Pink Spiders".

The Pink Spiders recorded their first EP three weeks later. The Pink Spiders Are Taking Over! (2004) was influenced by The Ramones, The Dead Boys, Buddy Holly, and the Bay City Rollers. The band's live debut consisted of a sold-out show in Nashville.

Friction used his job as a booking agent for The Muse to find shows for the band. Meanwhile, Ferrari worked as a substitute teacher, and the group donated plasma to fund their tours. The group eventually befriended the band Sadaharu. It was through them that The Pink Spiders found a record label to release their debut studio album.

The Pennsylvania-based and independent label, CI Records, released Hot Pink on January 4, 2005. The album features the trademarks of 1960s teen pop: the pop of a needle, crackles, and even hisses in between tracks. Influences from artists such as Elvis Costello, Nick Lowe, and Cheap Trick were apparent in Friction's songwriting. A vinyl version of the record was also released by Nashville's Spat! Records.

=== The Viper Room and major-label contract (2005) ===
The group was introduced to producer Dan Catullo by Jason Hollis, an old friend of Friction who lived in Los Angeles. Catullo arranged a private show for the band at West Hollywood's The Viper Room. The group asked their friend, Dave Paulson (frontman of Nashville-based The Privates), to play guitar with them at the show, and he accepted. The four slept over at a living unit located above Catullo's recording studio.

The performance took place on March 2, 2005. "After the set, the curtains closed and Jordan Schur ran onstage. He was immediately stopped by security but just barreled through them," said Friction of the experience. Ferrari said he opened his arms, exclaiming, "I gotta have this band!!!" Schur was the CEO of Geffen Records.

Several weeks following the show, the band chose Geffen from 11 major-label offers. The contract was signed, after which, according to Decious, the label took the band to Six Flags. The three bandmates moved to Hollywood: Friction and Decious rented an apartment on Sunset Boulevard and Ferrari lodged at the Gershwin Hollywood Hotel.

=== Major-label debut (2006) ===
Geffen hired Ric Ocasek, frontman of The Cars, to produce the group's major label debut. The group traveled to New York to commence recording at Electric Lady Studios. The album was originally intended to be released in April 2006, but the date was pushed to August.

The first single off the album was "Little Razorblade", with a music video was directed by Joseph Kahn. The video debuted on MTV's Total Request Live in April 2006 and peaked at number 12. The song received heavy rotation on the video network, Fuse, and reached the top spot on the Los Angeles-based radio station, KROQ. It was featured on the reality television series The Hills and was played in the clothing store Hollister Co. That year, The Pink Spiders performed on the Vans Warped Tour.

To support the band, the Pink Spiders toured with major bands such as Thirty Seconds to Mars, Good Charlotte, Yellowcard, Meg & Dia, All Time Low, Sugarcult, Damone, Kill Hannah, and Fall Out Boy. The group was also listed as one of the "100 bands you need to know in 2006" by Alternative Press.

Teenage Graffiti was released on August 1, 2006, and peaked at number 84 on the Billboard 200. The album was well-received by critics.

=== Third album and hiatus (2007–2009) ===
The Pink Spiders' third album was announced in late 2007 and set to be released in Spring 2008. Geffen hired producer Brendan O'Brien to work on the album. Friction wrote 25 songs for the album, of which half were approved for release.

The band bought a school bus, which they intended to use for touring. On March 13, 2008, somewhere between Nashville and Atlanta, the bus burned to the ground along with their possessions. The group lost "clothes, laptops, passports, IDs, IPods, cameras, receipts, cash, song lyrics, everything." Despite missed shows at Atlanta and New Orleans, the band announced that they would finish the rest of the tour.

During this period, the band encountered disagreements over money and direction, leading Decious and Ferrari to announce they would no longer be members of The Pink Spiders. The two played a last show on June 18, 2008, in Charlotte, North Carolina. They formed the country-rock group, Dixie Whiskey, in the following months.

Friction recruited replacements for Decious and Ferrari — Raf Cevallos on guitar, Joe Reilly on drums, and Ben Young on bass. The new line-up made its live debut at Cave 9 in Birmingham, Alabama several days later.

The new Pink Spiders completed the Tapped Kegs, Spread Legs, & Fertilized Eggs tour. The tour-only exclusive, Subterranean EP, contained unreleased versions of "Teenage Graffiti" and "Knock Knock", "Gimme Chemicals" and "Sleeping On the Floor" from Sweat It Out, as well as the b-sides "Typical Danger" and "We Do It All The Time".

In 2008, the band officially dissolved their contract with Geffen. After much deliberation, Sweat It Out was finally released on September 23, 2008, by Friction's own independent record label, Mean Buzz Records.

In 2009, Friction announced an extended hiatus. He embarked on a variety of side projects, including Matt Friction & the Cheap Shots and The Dozen Dimes.

=== Return (2010–present) ===
In 2010, the group accepted an offer to play at the bar mitzvah of a fan who lived in Los Angeles. On June 20, they held a concert at The Viper Room and Friction announced their return. "We aren't at a place where it's [about] money," said the lead singer in an interview with the Nashville Scene. He also announced that they had resolved their differences, but that Decious would be pursuing other interests. Brandon Jazz assumed bassist duties.

The band released "Cherry Chapstick b/w Sad Style", a two-track single, on March 21, 2011. That spring they completed the "2 Legit 2 Quit Tour".

In 2011, The Pink Spiders appeared in the Hal Leonard music educational DVD, Learn To Rock Drums With Jason Hartless And Friends, performing "Gimme Chemicals" live in Detroit with guest drummer Jason Hartless.

On August 6, 2016, the original lineup of Friction, Ferrari, and Decious reunited for a concert at the Mercy Lounge in Nashville to celebrate the 10th anniversary of the release of Teenage Graffiti. They were joined by Dave Paulson on guitar and Raf Cevallos on keyboards. On August 8, the band announced plans to release a new album, Mutations, in the summer of 2018.

On May 30, 2017, the band released two new singles, "Black Dagger" and "Easier Than Ever" for pre-sale exclusively on vinyl via their website. On June 13, 2017, the band uploaded a new lyric video for "Easier Than Ever" on their YouTube account, announcing that an official music video for the song would be coming soon.

In September 2017, The Pink Spiders announced a short 10 city Midwest/Northeast tour, titled the "Black Dagger Tour", starting December 13 and ending December 22, 2017. The tour was successful and helped the band when they announced a Kickstarter campaign to fund Mutations in January 2018, which reached 130% of its goal.

Once the Kickstarter campaign ended, the band began work at several studios in Nashville working on 11 songs slated to go on Mutations, released July 31, 2018.

== Television appearances ==
Between 2006 and 2008, The Pink Spiders appeared on MTV's Total Request Live, Discover and Download, and You Hear It First; as well as Fuse's Daily Download, Tattoo Stories, and Steven's Untitled Rock Show.

In May 2008, the band played for a Sweet 16 featured in Episode 6 of the Fourth Season of Hell's Kitchen, Performing "Seventeen Candles".

== Discography ==
=== Albums ===
- Hot Pink (2005)
- Teenage Graffiti (2006)
- Sweat It Out (2008)
- Mutations (2018)
- FREAKAZOID (2023)

=== EPs ===
- The Pink Spiders Are Taking Over! (2004)
- Subterranean EP (2008)

=== Singles ===
- "Little Razorblade" (2006)
- "The Chase" (2007)
- "Gimme Chemicals" (2008)
- "Cherry Chapstick" b/w "Sad Style" (2011)
- "Easier Than Ever" (2017)
- "Black Dagger" (2017)
- "I Can't Get Down Without You" (2018)
- "Gold Confetti" (2023)
- "Devotion" (2023)
- "Let's Go Home" (2023)
