= The Cars discography =

Cataloging of published recordings by the American rock band The Cars

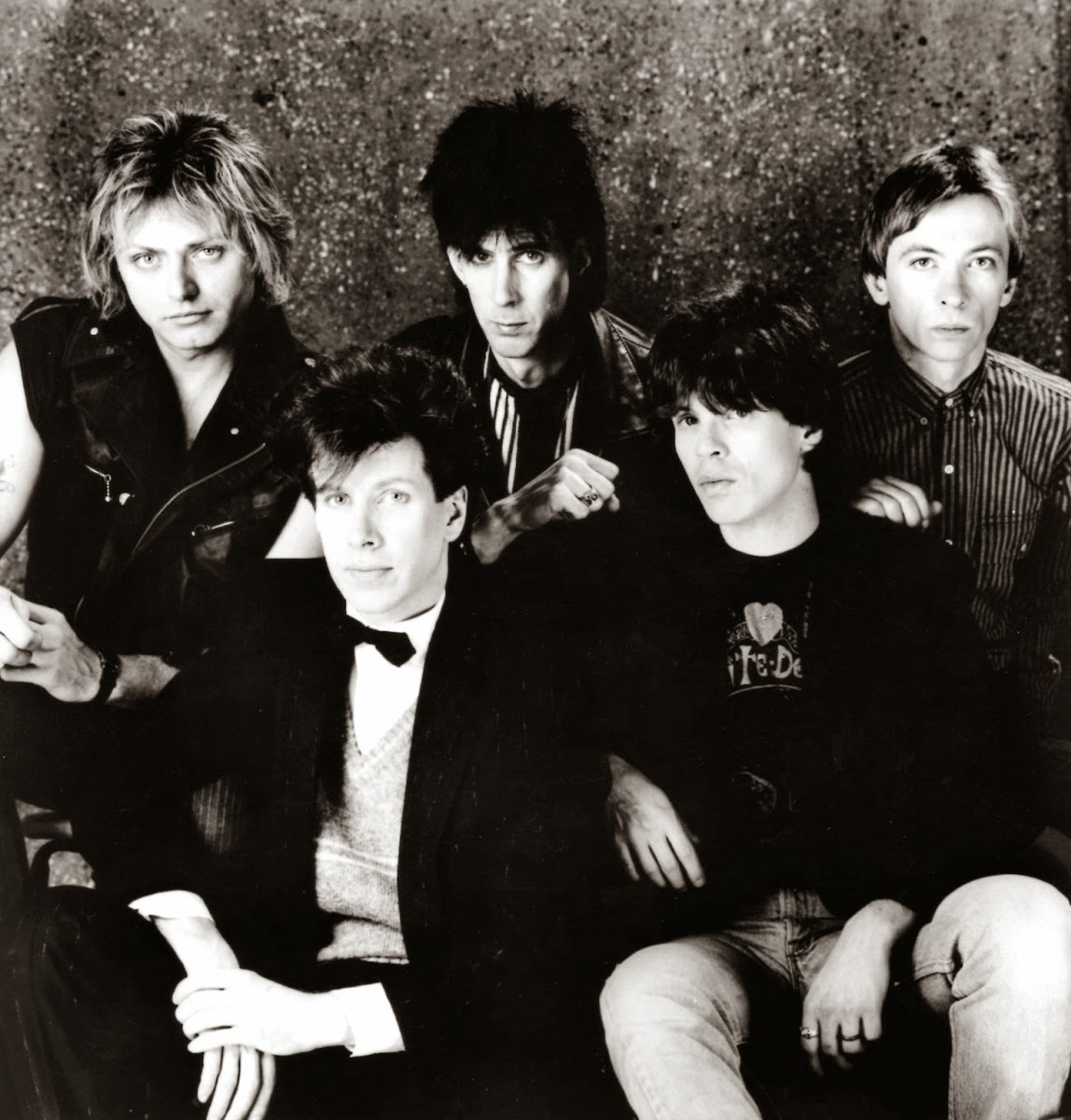
- Classic lineup of the Cars in 1984; left to right, top to bottom: Benjamin Orr, Ric Ocasek, Greg Hawkes, David Robinson, Elliot Easton
- Studio albums: 7
- Compilation albums: 8
- Singles: 26
- Video albums: 4
- Music videos: 20
- Box sets: 3

The discography of the American rock band the Cars includes seven studio albums, eight compilation albums, four video albums and 26 singles. Originating in Boston in 1976, the band originally consisted of singer and guitarist Ric Ocasek, singer and bassist Benjamin Orr, guitarist Elliot Easton, keyboardist Greg Hawkes, and drummer David Robinson. The band disbanded in 1988 and Orr died of pancreatic cancer in 2000. The band reformed in 2010 without Orr and released another studio album the following year before disbanding again shortly after. The Cars sold over 23 million albums in the United States and had 13 singles that reached the Top 40. The band was inducted into the Rock and Roll Hall of Fame in 2018 and reunited for the final time at the ceremony, and Ocasek died of natural causes the following year.

== Albums ==
=== Studio albums ===
| Title | Album details | Peak chart positions | | | | | | | | | | Certifications (sales threshold) |
| Title | Album details | US | AUS | CAN | GER | JPN | NL | NZ | SWE | SWI | UK | Certifications (sales threshold) |
|---|---|---|---|---|---|---|---|---|---|---|---|---|
| The Cars | Release date: June 6, 1978; Label: Elektra; Formats: LP, MC, 8-track | 18 | 35 | 50 | — | — | — | 5 | — | — | 29 | US: 6× Platinum; AUS: 2× Platinum; UK: Silver; MC: 2× Platinum; NZ: Gold |
| Candy-O | Release date: June 2, 1979; Label: Elektra; Formats: LP, MC, 8-track | 3 | 7 | 4 | — | — | — | 6 | — | — | 30 | US: 4× Platinum |
| Panorama | Release date: August 15, 1980; Label: Elektra; Formats: LP, MC, 8-track | 5 | 19 | 10 | — | 69 | — | 14 | — | — | — | US: Platinum; MC: Platinum |
| Shake It Up | Release date: November 6, 1981; Label: Elektra; Formats: LP, MC, 8-track | 9 | 20 | 7 | — | — | 40 | 12 | — | — | — | US: 2× Platinum; MC: Platinum |
| Heartbeat City | Release date: March 12, 1984; Label: Elektra; Formats: CD, LP, MC, 8-track | 3 | 15 | 5 | 15 | 22 | 41 | 1 | 26 | 20 | 25 | US: 4× Platinum; NZ: Gold; UK: Gold |
| Door to Door | Release date: August 25, 1987; Label: Elektra; Formats: CD, LP, MC, 8-track | 26 | 26 | 19 | 57 | 32 | — | 10 | 29 | 20 | 72 | US: Gold |
| Move Like This | Release date: May 10, 2011; Label: Hear Music; Formats: CD, LP, digital download | 7 | — | 22 | — | — | — | — | — | — | — | |
"—" denotes releases that did not chart.

=== Compilation albums ===
| Title | Album details | Peak chart positions | | | | | | Certifications (sales threshold) |
| Title | Album details | US | AUS | CAN | JPN | NZ | UK | Certifications (sales threshold) |
|---|---|---|---|---|---|---|---|---|
| Greatest Hits | Release date: October 18, 1985; Label: Elektra; Formats: CD, LP, MC, 8-track | 12 | 3 | 21 | 72 | 2 | 27 | US: 6× Platinum; AUS: 4× Platinum; NZ: Gold; UK: Gold |
| Just What I Needed: The Cars Anthology | Release date: November 7, 1995; Label: Elektra; Formats: 2xCD, 2xMC | — | — | — | — | — | — | |
| Shake It Up & Other Hits | Release date: June 19, 2001; Label: Elektra/Rhino; Formats: CD | — | — | — | — | — | — | |
| Complete Greatest Hits | Release date: February 19, 2002; Label: Elektra/Rhino; Formats: CD, MC | 32 | 65 | 55 | — | 10 | — | AUS: Gold |
| The Essentials | Release date: August 30, 2005; Label: WEA International; Formats: CD | — | — | — | — | — | — | |
| Classic Tracks | Release date: November 2008; Label: Elektra/Rhino; Formats: CD; Limited release | — | — | — | — | — | — | |
| Greatest Hits & More | Release date: 2008; Label: Timeless Media Group; Formats: CD | — | — | — | — | — | — | |
| Moving in Stereo: The Best of The Cars | Release date: 6 May 2016; Label: Rhino; Formats: CD, 2xLP, digital download | — | — | — | — | — | — | |
"—" denotes releases that did not chart.

=== Box sets ===
| Title | Album details |
|---|---|
| Original Album Series | Release date: 1 March 2010; Label: Rhino; Formats: 5xCD |
| Studio Album Collection: 1978–1987 | Release date: March 16, 2014; Label: Elektra/Rhino; Formats: digital download |
| The Elektra Years 1978–1987 | Release date: March 11, 2016; Label: Elektra; Formats: 6xCD, 6xLP, digital download |

== Singles ==
| Title | Year | Peak chart positions | | | | | | | | | | Certifications (sales threshold) | Album |
| Title | Year | US | US Rock | AUS | CAN | FRA | GER | NL | NZ | SWE | UK | Certifications (sales threshold) | Album |
|---|---|---|---|---|---|---|---|---|---|---|---|---|---|
| "Just What I Needed" | 1978 | 27 | — | 96 | 35 | 4 | — | — | 38 | — | 17 | BPI: Silver | The Cars |
| "My Best Friend's Girl" | 1978 | 35 | — | 67 | 55 | — | — | 40 | — | — | 3 | | The Cars |
| "Good Times Roll" | 1979 | 41 | — | — | 74 | 5 | — | — | — | — | — | | The Cars |
| "Let's Go" | 1979 | 14 | — | 6 | 5 | — | — | — | 40 | — | 51 | | Candy-O |
| "It's All I Can Do" | 1979 | 41 | — | — | 17 | — | — | — | — | — | — | | Candy-O |
| "Double Life" | 1979 | — | — | — | — | — | — | — | — | — | — | | Candy-O |
| "Touch and Go" | 1980 | 37 | — | 62 | 16 | 2 | — | — | 42 | — | — | | Panorama |
| "Don't Tell Me No" | 1980 | — | — | — | — | — | — | — | — | — | — | | Panorama |
| "Gimme Some Slack" | 1981 | — | — | — | — | — | — | — | — | — | — | | Panorama |
| "Shake It Up" | 1981 | 4 | 2 | 10 | 7 | 10 | — | 48 | 26 | — | — | | Shake It Up |
| "Cruiser" | 1981 | — | 37 | — | — | — | — | — | — | — | — | | Shake It Up |
| "Since You're Gone" | 1982 | 41 | 24 | — | — | 10 | — | — | — | — | 37 | | Shake It Up |
| "Victim of Love" | 1982 | — | 39 | — | — | — | — | — | — | — | — | | Shake It Up |
| "Think It Over" | 1982 | — | — | — | — | — | — | — | — | — | — | | Shake It Up |
| "You Might Think" | 1984 | 7 | 1 | 24 | 8 | — | — | 49 | 27 | 20 | 88 | | Heartbeat City |
| "Magic" | 1984 | 12 | 1 | 96 | 14 | 10 | — | — | 50 | — | — | | Heartbeat City |
| "Drive" | 1984 | 3 | 3 | 10 | 6 | 9 | 4 | 12 | 5 | 15 | 4 (Note: "Drive" originally peaked at #5 in the UK in 1984, but re-entered the chart in 1985 after being used for documentary footage during Live Aid, this time reaching #4.) | BPI: Gold | Heartbeat City |
| "Hello Again" | 1984 | 20 | 22 | 52 | 42 | 4 | 27 | — | 12 | — | — | | Heartbeat City |
| "It's Not the Night" (Note: Released as a 12" promotional single backed by "Drive".) | 1984 | — | 31 | — | — | — | — | — | — | — | — | | Heartbeat City |
| "Why Can't I Have You" | 1985 | 33 | 11 | — | 90 | — | — | — | — | — | — | | Heartbeat City |
| "Heartbeat City" | 1985 | — | — | 75 | — | — | — | — | — | — | 78 | | Heartbeat City |
| "Tonight She Comes" | 1985 | 7 | 1 | 16 | 36 | — | — | — | 20 | — | 79 | | Greatest Hits |
| "I'm Not the One (remix)" | 1986 | 32 | 29 | 75 | 82 | — | — | — | — | — | — | | Greatest Hits (Shake It Up) |
| "You Are the Girl" | 1987 | 17 | 2 | 69 | 33 | — | — | — | 30 | — | — | | Door to Door |
| "Strap Me In" | 1987 | 85 | 4 | — | — | — | — | — | — | — | — | | Door to Door |
| "Coming Up You" | 1988 | 74 | — | — | — | — | — | — | — | — | — | | Door to Door |
| "Sad Song" | 2011 | — | 33 | — | — | — | — | — | — | — | — | | Move Like This |
"—" denotes releases that did not chart.

== Videos ==
=== Video albums ===
| Title | Album details | Peak chart positions | |
| Title | Album details | US | UK |
|---|---|---|---|
| Heartbeat City | Release date: September 1984; Label: Warner Home Video; Formats: VHS, Betamax, LaserDisc | 10 | 16 |
| Live 1984–1985 | Release date: October 1985; Label: Vestron Music Video; Formats: VHS, Betamax, VHD, LaserDisc | — | 28 |
| The Cars Live | Release date: October 24, 2000; Label: Rhino Home Video, Warner Music Vision; Formats: DVD, VHS | — | — |
| The Cars Unlocked: The Live Performances | Release date: October 17, 2006; Label: Docurama, Warner Music Vision; Formats: DVD+CD | — | — |
"—" denotes releases that did not chart.

=== Music videos ===
| Title | Director | Album |
|---|---|---|
| "Just What I Needed" | | The Cars |
| "My Best Friend's Girl" | | The Cars |
| "Let's Go" | | Candy-O |
| "Double Life" | | Candy-O |
| "Dangerous Type" | | Candy-O |
| "Panorama" | Gerald Casale and Chuck Statler | Panorama |
| "Touch and Go" | Gerald Casale and Chuck Statler | Panorama |
| "Shake It Up" | Paul Justman | Shake It Up |
| "Since You're Gone" | Paul Justman | Shake It Up |
| "You Might Think" | CHRLX, Charlie Levi and Jeff Stein | Heartbeat City |
| "Magic" | Tim Pope | Heartbeat City |
| "Drive" | Timothy Hutton | Heartbeat City |
| "Hello Again" | Don Munroe and Andy Warhol | Heartbeat City |
| "Why Can't I Have You" | Peter Richardson | Heartbeat City |
| "Tonight She Comes" | Jeff Stein | Greatest Hits |
| "You Are the Girl" | Jeff Stein | Door to Door |
| "Strap Me In" | Doug Nichol | Door to Door |
| "Blue Tip" | | Move Like This |
| "Sad Song" | | Move Like This |
| "Free" | | Move Like This |
