= Complete Greatest Hits (The Cars album) =

Greatest hits album by the Cars
- Released: February 19, 2002
- Recorded: 1978–1987
- Genres: New wave; pop rock
- Length: 79:28
- Labels: Elektra; Rhino
- Producers: Roy Thomas Baker; The Cars; Greg Hawkes; Mutt Lange; Ric Ocasek; Mike Shipley

The Cars chronology
Shake It Up & Other Hits (2001)	Complete Greatest Hits (2002)	The Essentials (2005)

Professional ratings
Review scores
Source	Rating
AllMusic	5/5 stars
Encyclopedia of Popular Music	4/5 stars

Complete Greatest Hits is a greatest hits album by American rock band the Cars, released on February 19, 2002, by Elektra Records and Rhino Records. It contains 20 singles and notable album tracks in chronological order of their original release. Sales of the album reignited following Ric Ocasek's death in 2019.

The album was also released with different artwork entitled The Very Best of the Cars. In Europe the album was issued as The Definitive. The track selection was the same although the running order was altered.

This album includes all the tracks from their 1985 compilation Greatest Hits, excluding "Heartbeat City".

== Track listing ==
All tracks are written by Ric Ocasek, except where noted.

No.	Title	Original album	Length
1.	"Just What I Needed"	The Cars, 1978	3:45
2.	"My Best Friend's Girl"	The Cars	3:45
3.	"Good Times Roll"	The Cars	3:47
4.	"You're All I've Got Tonight"	The Cars	4:14
5.	"Bye Bye Love"	The Cars	4:15
6.	"Moving in Stereo" (Ocasek, Greg Hawkes)	The Cars	4:46
7.	"Let's Go"	Candy-O, 1979	3:35
8.	"It's All I Can Do"	Candy-O	3:45
9.	"Dangerous Type"	Candy-O	4:30
10.	"Touch and Go"	Panorama, 1980	4:57
11.	"Shake It Up"	Shake It Up, 1981	3:35
12.	"Since You're Gone"	Shake It Up	3:33
13.	"I'm Not the One"	Shake It Up	4:14
14.	"You Might Think"	Heartbeat City, 1984	3:07
15.	"Drive"	Heartbeat City	3:57
16.	"Magic"	Heartbeat City	3:59
17.	"Hello Again"	Heartbeat City	3:48
18.	"Why Can't I Have You"	Heartbeat City	4:05
19.	"Tonight She Comes"	Greatest Hits, 1985	3:56
20.	"You Are the Girl"	Door to Door, 1987	3:55
Total length:			79:28

== Personnel ==
Credits adapted from the liner notes.

=== The Cars ===
- Ric Ocasek – vocals, rhythm guitar
- Elliot Easton – lead guitar, backing vocals
- Greg Hawkes – keyboards, percussion, sax, backing vocals
- Benjamin Orr – vocals, bass guitar
- David Robinson – drums, percussion, backing vocals

=== Technical ===
- Roy Thomas Baker – production (tracks 1–13)
- Robert John "Mutt" Lange – production (tracks 14–18)
- The Cars – production (tracks 14–19); compilation production
- Mike Shipley – production (track 19)
- Ric Ocasek – production (track 20)
- Greg Hawkes – production (track 20)
- David McLees – compilation production
- Bill Inglot – sound production
- Dan Hersch – remastering

=== Artwork ===
- Brett Milano – liner notes
- Leigh Hall – liner note coordination
- Greg Allen – art direction
- David Robinson – design,Polaroid photography
- Ebet Roberts – booklet photography
- B.C. Kagan – booklet photography
- Brian McLaughlin – photography (page 15)

== Charts ==
Chart (2002)	Peak position
Australian Albums (ARIA)	65
New Zealand Albums (RMNZ)	10

Chart (2019)	Peak position
Canadian Albums (Billboard)	55
US Billboard 200	32
US Top Rock Albums (Billboard)	6

== Certifications ==
Region	Certification	Certified units/sales
Australia (ARIA)	Gold	35,000^{^}
^{^} Shipments figures based on certification alone.
