= Just What I Needed: The Cars Anthology =

Compilation album by the Cars
- Released: November 7, 1995
- Recorded: 1977–1987
- Genre: New wave; pop rock; rock
- Length: 2:31:54
- Label: Rhino
- Producer: The Cars; Roy Thomas Baker; Mutt Lange; Mike Shipley; Ric Ocasek

The Cars chronology
Door to Door (1987)	Just What I Needed: The Cars Anthology (1995)	Shake It Up & Other Hits (2001)

Professional ratings
Review scores
Source	Rating
AllMusic	4.5/5 stars
Encyclopedia of Popular Music	4/5 stars
The Rolling Stone Album Guide	4/5 stars

Just What I Needed: The Cars Anthology is a two-disc, career-spanning compilation album of songs by the American new wave rock band the Cars. It features most of the band's singles, as well as many album tracks, non-album B-sides and unreleased songs.

== Background ==
Just What I Needed contains the original album version of "I'm Not the One" from 1981's Shake It Up, while the rendition on their 1985 Greatest Hits collection was a new remix. "Heartbeat City" is the only song on Greatest Hits that does not appear on this album.

Whereas their Greatest Hits contained the band's most popular hit singles, Just What I Needed includes deeper album tracks, demos, B-sides and unreleased tracks, along with the requisite hits.

Upon its release, Elliot Easton announced that an expanded collection of rarities would be released in the spring, but it has yet to materialize.

== Rare and unreleased tracks ==
"Leave or Stay" and "Ta Ta Wayo Wayo" were recorded as demos in 1977. "Leave or Stay" and "Ta Ta Wayo Wayo" were eventually re-recorded for the band's 1987 album Door to Door. "Take Me Now" and "Cool Fool" are also 1977 demos that were never re-recorded.

The early version of "Night Spots" from 1978 is an unfinished outtake from the band's first album, featuring only Ric Ocasek and Greg Hawkes. It was eventually re-recorded for 1979's Candy-O.

The previously unreleased "Slipaway" was recorded as a 24-track demo by The Cars between their first and second albums in 1979. Rather than record a finished studio version, the Cars gave the song to Ian Lloyd, who issued his version later in 1979.

"That's It" (B-side of 1979's "Let's Go"), "Don't Go to Pieces" (B-side of 1980's "Don't Tell Me No" & 1981's "Gimme Some Slack") and "Breakaway" (B-side of 1985's "Why Can't I Have You") are non-album single B-sides that appear on CD for the first time in this collection.

=== Previously unreleased cover songs ===
Demo covers of The Nightcrawlers' "The Little Black Egg" & Iggy Pop's "Funtime" were initially made as backing tracks for Bebe Buell to record vocals over for her 1981 EP Covers Girl. These versions feature lead vocals by Ric Ocasek and Benjamin Orr, respectively, and were previously unreleased.

== Track listing ==
All tracks are written by Ric Ocasek, except where noted.

Disc one
No.	Title	Writer(s)	Original album	Length
1.	"Just What I Needed"		The Cars (1978)	3:46
2.	"My Best Friend's Girl"		The Cars	3:46
3.	"Good Times Roll"		The Cars	3:48
4.	"You're All I've Got Tonight"		The Cars	4:16
5.	"Don't Cha Stop"		The Cars	3:05
6.	"Moving in Stereo"	Greg Hawkes, Ocasek	The Cars	4:47
7.	"Take Me Now"		Previously unreleased	4:01
8.	"Cool Fool"	Elliot Easton, Ocasek	Previously unreleased	2:42
9.	"Let's Go"		Candy-O (1979)	3:36
10.	"Candy-O"		Candy-O	2:39
11.	"Dangerous Type"		Candy-O	4:32
12.	"Double Life"		Candy-O	4:26
13.	"Got a Lot on My Head"		Candy-O	3:01
14.	"It's All I Can Do"		Candy-O	3:47
15.	"Night Spots" (original demo version)		Previously unreleased; re-recorded for Candy-O	3:09
16.	"Slipaway"		Previously unreleased	3:43
17.	"That's It"		B-side of "Let's Go" (1979)	3:24
18.	"Panorama"		Panorama (1980)	5:46
19.	"Gimme Some Slack"		Panorama	3:35
20.	"Don't Go to Pieces"	Hawkes, Ocasek	B-side of "Don't Tell Me No" (1980)/"Gimme Some Slack" (1981)	4:03

Disc two
No.	Title	Writer(s)	Original album	Length
1.	"Touch and Go"		Panorama	4:58
2.	"Don't Tell Me No"		Panorama	4:02
3.	"Shake It Up"		Shake It Up (1981)	3:35
4.	"Since You're Gone"		Shake It Up	3:33
5.	"I'm Not the One"		Shake It Up	4:15
6.	"Cruiser"		Shake It Up	4:58
7.	"The Little Black Egg"	Chuck Conlon	Previously unreleased	2:54
8.	"Funtime"	David Bowie, Iggy Pop	Previously unreleased	3:10
9.	"You Might Think"		Heartbeat City (1984)	3:08
10.	"Drive"		Heartbeat City	3:57
11.	"Magic"		Heartbeat City	4:00
12.	"Hello Again"		Heartbeat City	3:49
13.	"Why Can't I Have You"		Heartbeat City	4:05
14.	"Breakaway"		B-side of "Why Can't I Have You" (1985)	3:47
15.	"Tonight She Comes"		Greatest Hits (1985)	3:57
16.	"You Are the Girl"		Door to Door (1987)	3:56
17.	"Strap Me In"		Door to Door	4:26
18.	"Door to Door"		Door to Door	3:20
19.	"Leave or Stay" (1977 demo version)		Previously unreleased; re-recorded for Door to Door	3:02
20.	"Ta Ta Wayo Wayo" (1977 demo version)		Previously unreleased; re-recorded for Door to Door	2:48
Total length:				2:31:54

== Personnel ==
- Elliot Easton – lead guitar, backing vocals
- Greg Hawkes – keyboard, backing vocals
- Ric Ocasek – rhythm guitar, lead vocals on disc one tracks: 2–5, 11–13, 15, 16, 18, 19; disc two tracks: 1, 3–5, 7, 9, 11–20
- Benjamin Orr – bass guitar, lead vocals on disc one tracks: 1, 6–10, 14, 17, 20; disc two tracks: 2, 6, 8, 10
- David Robinson – drums, percussion
