= Substitution Mass Confusion: A Tribute to The Cars =

Compilation album by Various artists
- Released: February 8, 2005
- Genre: Rock, Pop, Acoustic rock, Album rock
- Label: Not Lame Recordings
- Producer: Butch Walker

Substitution Mass Confusion: A Tribute to The Cars is a 2005 compilation album featuring covers of songs originally performed by the American rock band The Cars. The album was released by Not Lame Recordings. Many of the performers featured on the album were from the Boston area, where The Cars first gained exposure in the late 1970s.

The line 'Substitution Mass Confusion' comes from a lyric in the Cars song "Bye Bye Love".

According to Billboard, the album was inspired by the 2000 cancer death of Cars singer and bassist Benjamin Orr. A portion of the album's proceeds were to be donated to the American Cancer Society in Orr's memory.

== Reception ==
Boston Globe writer Jim Sullivan noted that while many of the performances were faithful to the original arrangements, some, including Butch Walker's acoustic version of "My Best Friend's Girl", were significant departures. Cars keyboardist Greg Hawkes singled out Damone's version of "Just What I Needed" and Spiraling's version of "Bye Bye Love" for praise.

== Track listing ==
No.	Title	Artist	Length
1.	"Hello Again"	The Argument
2.	"Just What I Needed"	Damone
3.	"Touch and Go"	Jason Falkner
4.	"My Best Friend's Magic Girlfriend" (mashup of My Best Friend's Girl and Magic)	Butch Walker
5.	"You're All I've Got Tonight"	Millions
6.	"You Might Think"	Bleu
7.	"Got a Lot on My Head"	Owsley
8.	"Shake It Up"	Purr Box
9.	"Drive"	Chris Von Sneidern
10.	"Dangerous Type"	Johnny Monaco
11.	"Bye Bye Love"	Spiraling
12.	"It's All I Can Do"	The Bravery
13.	"I'm Not the One"	Gigolo Aunts
14.	"Candy-O"	Doug Powell
15.	"Since You're Gone"	The Andersons
16.	"Let's Go"	Dum Dog Run
17.	"Slip Away"	Sparkle*Jets U.K.
18.	"Misfit Kid"	Jon Auer
19.	"Tonight She Comes"	Action Action
20.	"Night Spots"	The Cautions
21.	"Good Times Roll"	Daybirds
