= The Essentials (The Cars album) =

Compilation album by the Cars
- Released: 2005
- Recorded: 1978–1987
- Genre: New wave
- Label: WEA International
- Producer: Roy Thomas Baker; Mutt Lange; Mike Shipley; Ric Ocasek; The Cars; David McLees

The Cars chronology
Complete Greatest Hits (2002)	The Essentials (2005)	Move Like This (2011)

Professional ratings
Review scores
Source	Rating
AllMusic	4.5/5 stars
Encyclopedia of Popular Music	4/5 stars

The Essentials by the Cars is a compilation of hits released by WEA International in 2005.

== Track listing ==
All tracks are written by Ric Ocasek.

No.	Title	Original album	Length
1.	"My Best Friend's Girl"	The Cars	3:44
2.	"You Might Think"	Heartbeat City	3:04
3.	"Since You're Gone"	Shake It Up	3:30
4.	"Shake It Up"	Shake It Up	3:32
5.	"Just What I Needed"	The Cars	3:43
6.	"Magic"	Heartbeat City	3:57
7.	"Touch and Go"	Panorama	4:55
8.	"Drive"	Heartbeat City	3:55
9.	"You Are the Girl"	Door to Door	3:52
10.	"Candy-O"	Candy-O	2:36
11.	"Tonight She Comes"	Greatest Hits	3:52
12.	"Let's Go"	Candy-O	3:33

== Personnel ==
- Ric Ocasek – rhythm guitar, lead vocals on 1, 2, 3, 4, 6, 7, 9, 11
- Benjamin Orr – bass guitar, lead vocals on 5, 8, 10, 12
- Elliot Easton – lead guitar, backing vocals
- Greg Hawkes – keyboards, backing vocals
- David Robinson – drums, percussion
