= Shake It Up & Other Hits =

Compilation album by the Cars

Compilation album by The Cars
- Released: June 19, 2001
- Recorded: 1978–1987
- Genre: New wave; rock; power pop; pop rock
- Label: Elektra; Rhino
- Producer: Roy Thomas Baker; Mutt Lange; Mike Shipley; The Cars; Ric Ocasek

The Cars chronology
Just What I Needed: The Cars Anthology (1995)	Shake It Up & Other Hits (2001)	Complete Greatest Hits (2002)

Professional ratings
Review scores
Source	Rating
AllMusic	3/5 stars
Encyclopedia of Popular Music	3/5 stars

Shake It Up & Other Hits is a budget compilation album of the Cars' songs, released on June 19, 2001, by Rhino Records.

== Track listing ==
All tracks are written by Ric Ocasek.

No.	Title	Original album	Length
1.	"Shake It Up"	Shake It Up	3:32
2.	"Let's Go"	Candy-O	3:33
3.	"Magic"	Heartbeat City	3:57
4.	"Touch and Go"	Panorama	4:55
5.	"Bye Bye Love"	The Cars	4:14
6.	"Tonight She Comes"	Greatest Hits	3:52
7.	"Why Can't I Have You"	Heartbeat City	4:04
8.	"Coming Up You"	Door to Door	4:18
9.	"You Are the Girl"	Door to Door	3:52
10.	"Just What I Needed"	The Cars	3:43

== Personnel ==
- Elliot Easton – lead guitar, backing vocals
- Greg Hawkes – keyboard, backing vocals
- Ric Ocasek – rhythm guitar, lead vocals on 1, 3, 4, 6, 7, 9
- Benjamin Orr – bass guitar, lead vocals on 2, 5, 8, 10
- David Robinson – drums, percussion
