= The Cars Unlocked: The Live Performances =

Live album video by the Cars
- Released: October 17, 2006
- Recorded: Various
- Venue: Various
- Genre: New wave
- Length: 56:20 (CD)
- Language: English
- Label: Warner Music Entertainment

The Cars Unlocked: The Live Performances is a 2006 live album and video by American new wave band the Cars, released in 2006 by Warner Music. The album has received mixed reviews due to the mixed quality of the source material.

== Critical reception ==
Greg Prato of AllMusic gave the album a positive review, with the editorial staff awarding it four out of five stars. Prato praises the diversity of the video choices while criticizing some of the quality of the recordings, summing up that it is "a most welcome addition to the Cars' discography". At DVD Talk Jon Sinnott recommended "skip it" due to poor audio and video, although he praised some of the performances. For PopMatters, Adam Besenyodi echoes the sentiments that the actual audio-video quality is low but it serves as a valuable document of the band, with songs ranging from "good" to "unwatcheable"; he recommends that the CD edition "shouldn't be skipped".

== Track listing ==
All songs written by Ric Ocasek, except where noted.

DVD

1. Intro
2. "My Best Friend's Girl (song)"
3. "I'm in Touch with Your World"
4. "Let's Go (Cars song)"
5. "Lust For Kicks
6. "Gimme Some Slack"
7. Don't Tell Me No"
8. "Up and Down"
9. "Just What I Needed"
10. "Don't Cha Stop"
11. "Moving in Stereo" (Greg Hawkes, Ocasek)
12. "Through to You"
13. "Candy-O"
14. "You Might Think"
15. "Drive"
16. "Night Spots"
17. "Fine Line"
18. "Tonight She Comes"
19. "Magic"
20. "Shake It Up"
21. "Good Times Roll"
  - "Cruiser"
  - "Strap Me In"
  - "Drive"
  - "Touch and Go"
  - "Everything You Say"

CD

1. "Magic" – 4:28
2. "Let's Go" – 3:42
3. "Touch and Go" – 4:59
4. "Drive" – 3:54
5. "My Best Friend's Girl" – 3:39
6. "Tonight She Comes" – 3:51
7. "Moving in Stereo" (Hawkes, Ocasek) –4:25
8. "You Might Think" – 3:15
9. "Just What I Needed" – 3:27
10. "Good Times Roll" – 3:34
11. "Hello Again" – 3:58
12. "Double Trouble" – 4:11
13. "Night Spots" – 3:31
14. "Heartbeat City" – 5:26

== Personnel ==
The Cars

- Elliot Easton – lead guitar, backing vocals
- Greg Hawkes – keyboards, guitars, backing vocals
- Ric Ocasek – lead and backing vocals, rhythm guitar, keyboards
- Benjamin Orr – bass guitar, lead and backing vocals
- David Robinson – drums, percussion, backing vocals
