= The Elektra Years 1978–1987 =

Box set by the Cars
- Released: March 11, 2016
- Recorded: 1978–1987
- Genres: New wave; pop rock; power pop
- Label: Elektra
- Producers: The Cars; Mutt Lange; Roy Thomas Baker; Mike Shipley

The Cars chronology
Classic Tracks (2008)	The Elektra Years 1978–1987 (2016)	Moving in Stereo: The Best of The Cars (2016)

Professional ratings
Review scores
Source	Rating
AllMusic	4/5 stars
PopMatters	8/10 stars

The Elektra Years 1978–1987 is a box set containing the six albums released by the American new wave rock band the Cars during that time period. Each album was newly remastered by Ted Jensen, under the supervision of band member Ric Ocasek. It was released in 2016 on Elektra Records on CD, digital and vinyl formats.

== Albums ==
1. The Cars (1978)
2. Candy-O (1979)
3. Panorama (1980)
4. Shake It Up (1981)
5. Heartbeat City (1984)
6. Door to Door (1987)

Notes

- The CD packaging replicates the original vinyl releases with the original vinyl inner sleeves serving as inserts for the CD slipcases.
- Heartbeat City in this box set is now released with white color borders instead of the original maroon, this change in color is what the band intended for the original release.
- The albums do not feature any bonus tracks. Consequently, non-album tracks released by the Cars on Elektra (most notably the hit "Tonight She Comes", as well as several B-sides and remixes) do not appear in this box set compilation.
