= Cruiser (song) =

Single by the Cars

from the album Shake It Up
- A-side: "Shake It Up"
- Released: November 9, 1981
- Recorded: 1981
- Studio: Syncro Sound (Boston, Massachusetts)
- Genre: New wave; rock
- Length: 4:54
- Label: Elektra
- Songwriter: Ric Ocasek
- Producer: Roy Thomas Baker

The Cars singles chronology
"Gimme Some Slack" (1981)	"Shake It Up" / "Cruiser" (1981)	"Since You're Gone" (1982)

Shake It Up track listing
- 9 tracks Side one: 1. "Since You're Gone"; 2. "Shake It Up"; 3. "I'm Not the One"; 4. "Victim of Love"; 5. "Cruiser"; Side two: 6. "A Dream Away"; 7. "This Could Be Love"; 8. "Think It Over"; 9. "Maybe Baby"

"Cruiser" is a song by American new wave band the Cars, from their fourth studio album Shake It Up (1981).

== Background ==
"Cruiser" was written by Cars songwriter and vocalist Ric Ocasek and sung by bassist-vocalist Benjamin Orr.

Upon the release of Shake It Up, "Cruiser" was singled out for some praise. The Bangor Daily News, in an otherwise unenthusiastic review of Shake It Up, cited "Cruiser" as a source of "real excitement". AllMusic reviewer Greg Prato describes the song as "rocking" and a highlight of the album. On the other hand, AllMusic critic Tim Sendra describes the song as "a pale version of a rocker from either of the first two albums." Daily Record critic Jim Bohen describes how drummer David Robinson "pounds his drums over the beat of the rhythm machine" to generate "dance floor dynamics."

At the end of the song, guitarist Elliot Easton played in multiple styles in an attempt to emulate the Beatles' guitarists playing off each other during their 1969 song "The End".

In addition to appearing on the album, "Cruiser" was released as the B-side of the single "Shake It Up". "Cruiser" was also included in the 1995 Cars compilation album Just What I Needed: The Cars Anthology. Prato describes the song as a highlight of the anthology.

Live versions of the song appeared in the VHS release The Cars Live 1984–1985 and the CD/DVD release The Cars Unlocked.

== Reception ==
"Cruiser" became a minor rock radio hit on its own. It reached No. 37 on Billboard's Top Tracks chart in 1982. Along with "Shake It Up" it reached No. 14 on the Billboard Dance Club Songs chart. The Boston Globe critic Steve Morse praised "Cruiser" as a highlight of Shake It Up and an exception from the "absence of spirit" of the album.

Ultimate Classic Rock critic Bryan Wawzenek described it as a "modern rock radio favorite."

== Chart performance ==
Chart (1981)	Peak position
US Billboard Mainstream Rock	37
US Billboard Dance Club Songs	14
