= Victim of Love (The Cars song) =

1982 single by The Cars

Single by the Cars

from the album Shake It Up
- B-side: "This Could Be Love"
- Released: June 1982
- Recorded: 1981
- Studio: Syncro Sound (Boston, Massachusetts)
- Genre: New wave; synth-rock
- Length: 4:24
- Label: Elektra
- Songwriter: Ric Ocasek
- Producer: Roy Thomas Baker

The Cars US singles chronology
"Since You're Gone" (1981)	"Victim of Love" (1982)	"You Might Think" (1984)

Shake It Up track listing
- 9 tracks Side one: 1. "Since You're Gone"; 2. "Shake It Up"; 3. "I'm Not the One"; 4. "Victim of Love"; 5. "Cruiser"; Side two: 6. "A Dream Away"; 7. "This Could Be Love"; 8. "Think It Over"; 9. "Maybe Baby"

"Victim of Love" is a song by the American new wave band the Cars, appearing on their fourth studio album, Shake It Up. It was written by Ric Ocasek.

== Release and reception ==
"Victim of Love" was first released on Shake It Up in November 1981. However, in June the next year, it was released as the third American single from Shake It Up (the first two being "Shake It Up" and "Since You're Gone"). Although the song did not chart on the Billboard Hot 100, it hit #39 on the Mainstream Rock chart. The single was not released in Britain; another track from Shake It Up, "Think It Over", was released as a single instead.

AllMusic critic Greg Prato described the track as "pop-oriented" and listed it as one of "many lesser-known album tracks [that] prove[d] to be highlights [on Shake It Up]." Ultimate Classic Rock critic Bryan Wawzenek described it as a "modern rock radio favorite."

== B-side ==
The B-side of "Victim of Love" is the Greg Hawkes-Ric Ocasek written track, "This Could Be Love". The song appeared on the second side of the Shake It Up album.

== Charts ==
Chart performance for "Victim of Love"
Chart (1982)	Peak position
US Mainstream Rock (Billboard)	39
