= Dangerous Type =

Song by the Cars

from the album Candy-O
- Released: June 13, 1979
- Recorded: 1979
- Studio: Cherokee (Hollywood, Los Angeles)
- Genre: New wave; hard rock
- Length: 4:28
- Label: Elektra
- Songwriter: Ric Ocasek
- Producer: Roy Thomas Baker

Candy-O track listing
- 11 tracks Side one: 1. "Let's Go"; 2. "Since I Held You"; 3. "It's All I Can Do"; 4. "Double Life"; 5. "Shoo Be Doo"; 6. "Candy-O"; Side two: 7. "Night Spots"; 8. "You Can't Hold on Too Long"; 9. "Lust for Kicks"; 10. "Got a Lot on My Head"; 11. "Dangerous Type"

"Dangerous Type" is a song by the Cars from their second studio album, Candy-O (1979). It was written by Ric Ocasek.

== Background ==
The core guitar riff that "Dangerous Type" is centered on resembles the T. Rex song, "Bang a Gong". The song features Ric Ocasek on lead vocals. AllMusic critic Tom Maginnis compared the song to "All Mixed Up", a track on The Cars' self-titled debut album, as they both were the final track on their respective albums, with both tracks "vamping on an upsweep of grand chord changes as the group's entire sonic palette eventually fills the tape to capacity for the big finish."

Although "Dangerous Type" never was released as a single, the song has since become a fan favorite. It has appeared on numerous compilation albums, among them Just What I Needed: The Cars Anthology and Complete Greatest Hits.

== Reception ==
"Dangerous Type" has received positive reception from music critics. AllMusic critic Greg Prato said it was one of the "plenty of other standouts [besides "Let's Go" on Candy-O that] can be found" and cited the track as a highlight from Candy-O. Tom Maginnis said, "'Dangerous Type' is the Cars' idea of a musical epic", and went on to say, "After the impossibly infectious leadoff single 'Let's Go,' 'Dangerous Type' would become the album's second-biggest hit." Classic Rock History critic Brian Kachejian rated it as the Cars' 9th greatest song, praising the way "the sound of the drums, bass, keyboards, and guitar all blend together so nicely without losing their distinctive sounds." In the Just What I Needed: The Cars Anthology liner notes, Brett Milano said, "'Let's Go' and 'Dangerous Type' [stood] out as the best of [Ric] Ocasek's enigmatic-woman songs." Rolling Stone rated it as one of the Cars' 17 essential songs, with critic Elias Leight saying that "Ocasek uses repetition for maximum impact" and "runs through the four-line hook 10 different times in four and a half minutes."

== Covers ==
- In 1996, Letters to Cleo recorded a cover of "Dangerous Type" for the movie, The Craft.
- The song was covered by Johnny Monaco for the tribute album Substitution Mass Confusion: A Tribute to The Cars.

== Personnel ==
- Ric Ocasek: rhythm guitar, lead vocals
- Benjamin Orr: bass guitar, backing vocals
- Elliot Easton: lead guitar, backing vocals
- Greg Hawkes: keyboards, backing vocals
- David Robinson: drums
