= The Sound of Our Town =

2007 book by Brett Milano

The Sound of Our Town: A History of Boston Rock and Roll
- First edition cover
- Author: Brett Milano
- Language: English
- Genre: Music journalism
- Publisher: Commonwealth Editions
- Publication date: 2007
- Publication place: United States
- Media type: Print (Paperback)
- Pages: 254
- ISBN: 9781933212302 (first edition, paperback)

The Sound of Our Town: A History of Boston Rock and Roll is a 2007 book about the distinctive rock music scene of Boston, Massachusetts. It was written by Brett Milano, a Boston-based music critic and columnist.

The book is billed as the "first comprehensive history of Boston rock and roll", beginning in the 1950s, and includes interviews with numerous Boston-based musicians and bands, including Aerosmith, Mission of Burma, the Cars, the Pixies, and J. Geils. The Boston Globe wrote that The Sound of Our Town depicts Boston's "diversity of scenes and attitudes, much of it driven by the constant influx of college students and transplants", creating a "healthy dissonance" that defined the Boston rock sound.

The book's cover art is a photograph of the author, Brett Milano, introducing Boston musician Willie Alexander. Milano entered the Boston music scene in the 1980s as a music journalist. He was a long-time columnist for the Boston Phoenix, as well as the Boston Globe and Sound & Vision magazine. Milano has also written for publications such as Billboard, Pulse, and the College Media Journal. In 2013, he became the editor of OffBeat, where he has written about music since 2005.

The Sound of Our Town was written over the course of two years, though Milano had been collecting material for several years beforehand. Milano's approach to the problem of structuring the book to reflect the typical chaos of a local music scene was "to at least give a mention to every great band I could ... without making it just a laundry-list of bands", in an effort to "catch the spirit of the time and places, and tell some of the more important band histories, and have it flow as a story".

== Critical reception ==
The Sound of Our Town received a positive review from the Boston Globe, which stated that it "should be required reading for anyone interested in understanding Boston's unique contribution to rock 'n' roll".
