= Greatest Hits (The Cars album) =

Greatest hits album by the Cars
- Released: October 25, 1985
- Recorded: 1978–1985
- Genres: New wave; pop rock; power pop
- Length: 50:15
- Label: Elektra
- Producers: The Cars; Mutt Lange; Roy Thomas Baker; Mike Shipley

The Cars chronology
Heartbeat City (1984)	Greatest Hits (1985)	Door to Door (1987)

Singles from Greatest Hits
- 1. "Tonight She Comes" Released: October 14, 1985; 2. "I'm Not the One" Released: January 13, 1986

Professional ratings
Review scores
Source	Rating
AllMusic	4.5/5 stars
Encyclopedia of Popular Music	3/5 stars
Robert Christgau	A−
The Rolling Stone Album Guide	3.5/5 stars

Greatest Hits is a greatest hits album by American rock band the Cars, released on October 25, 1985, by Elektra Records. "Tonight She Comes", a previously unreleased song, and a remix of "I'm Not the One" were issued as singles to support the album. It was a commercial success, going six-times platinum. It was remastered for gold CD by Steve Hoffman in 1998 for DCC Compact Classics.

== Track listing ==
All tracks are written by Ric Ocasek.

Side one
No.	Title	Original album	Length
1.	"Just What I Needed"	The Cars, 1978	3:43
2.	"Since You're Gone"	Shake It Up, 1981	3:31
3.	"You Might Think"	Heartbeat City, 1984	3:04
4.	"Good Times Roll"	The Cars	3:44
5.	"Touch and Go"	Panorama, 1980	4:54
6.	"Drive"	Heartbeat City	3:54

Side two
No.	Title	Original album	Length
7.	"Tonight She Comes"	Previously unreleased	3:52
8.	"My Best Friend's Girl"	The Cars	3:44
9.	"Heartbeat City" (not included on vinyl release)	Heartbeat City	4:29
10.	"Let's Go"	Candy-O, 1979	3:33
11.	"I'm Not the One" (remix)	Shake It Up	4:07
12.	"Magic"	Heartbeat City	3:57
13.	"Shake It Up"	Shake It Up	3:32

== Personnel ==
- Ric Ocasek – lead vocals, backing vocals on tracks 1, 6 and 10, rhythm guitar
- Benjamin Orr – bass, lead vocals on tracks 1, 6 and 10, backing vocals
- Greg Hawkes – keyboards, backing vocals
- Elliot Easton – lead guitar, backing vocals
- David Robinson – drums
- George Marino – mastering at Sterling Sound, NYC
- Steve Hoffman – remastering for DCC Compact Classics CD and LP reissues

== Charts ==
=== Weekly charts ===
1985–1986 weekly chart performance for Greatest Hits
Chart (1985–1986)	Peak position
Australian Albums (Kent Music Report)	3
Canada Top Albums/CDs (RPM)	21
New Zealand Albums (RMNZ)	2
UK Albums (Official Charts)	27
US Billboard 200	12

2023 weekly chart performance for Greatest Hits
Chart (2023)	Peak position
Hungarian Physical Albums (MAHASZ)	34

=== Year-end charts ===
1985 year-end chart performance for Greatest Hits
Chart (1985)	Position
Canada Top Albums/CDs (RPM)	99
New Zealand Albums (RMNZ)	48

1986 year-end chart performance for Greatest Hits
Chart (1986)	Position
Australian Albums (Kent Music Report)	13
New Zealand Albums (RMNZ)	16
US Billboard 200	53

== Certifications ==
Region	Certification	Certified units/sales
Australia (ARIA)	4× Platinum	280,000^{^}
New Zealand (RMNZ)	Platinum	15,000^{^}
United Kingdom (BPI)	Gold	100,000^{^}
United States (RIAA)	6× Platinum	6,000,000^{^}
^{^} Shipments figures based on certification alone.
