= Think It Over (The Cars song) =

Single by the Cars

from the album Shake It Up
- B-side: "I'm Not the One"
- Released: August 1982
- Recorded: 1981
- Studio: Syncro Sound (Boston)
- Genre: New wave; synth-rock
- Length: 4:56
- Label: Elektra
- Songwriter: Ric Ocasek
- Producer: Roy Thomas Baker

The Cars singles chronology
"Since You're Gone" (1981)	"Think It Over" (1982)	"You Might Think" (1984)

Shake It Up track listing
- 9 tracks Side one: 1. "Since You're Gone"; 2. "Shake It Up"; 3. "I'm Not the One"; 4. "Victim of Love"; 5. "Cruiser"; Side two: 6. "A Dream Away"; 7. "This Could Be Love"; 8. "Think It Over"; 9. "Maybe Baby"

"Think It Over" is a song by American rock band the Cars from their fourth studio album, Shake It Up (1981). It was written by Ric Ocasek.

== Release ==
"Think It Over" first saw release on the 1981 album Shake It Up, but following the release of the album, the song was released as a single in the United Kingdom and Australia. Backed with "I'm Not the One" (which later became successful in its own right), the single did not make a dent in the charts. The single was not released in the United States, as the track "Victim of Love" (also from Shake It Up) received a single release instead.

== Critical reception ==
AllMusic critic Greg Prato cited the track as a highlight from Shake It Up, and described the track as "almost entirely synth-oriented" and called it one of the "many lesser-known album tracks [on Shake It Up that] prove[d] to be [a] highlight". But fellow Allmusic critic Time Sendra called it "a lesser version of [the album's hit single] 'Shake It Up.'" Boston Globe critic Steve Morse praised "Think It Over" as a high point of Shake It Up and an exception from the "absence of spirit" of the album. Morse called "Think It Over" a "great dance tune," saying that "it seems to borrow heavily from Roy Hamilton's 1958 hit, 'Don't Let Go'". The Sun critic Sadie Smith wrote that it "has a great synthesized intro, that gets quite intense and never lets up." Classic Rock History critic Emily Fagan rated it as the Cars 9th best song sung by Orr, praising the "strong musical composition and production" and calling it "catchy".
