= Night Spots =

Song by the Cars

from the album Candy-O
- Released: June 13, 1979
- Recorded: 1979
- Studio: Cherokee (Hollywood, Los Angeles)
- Genre: New wave; hard rock
- Length: 3:15
- Label: Elektra
- Songwriter: Ric Ocasek
- Producer: Roy Thomas Baker

Candy-O track listing
- 11 tracks Side one: 1. "Let's Go"; 2. "Since I Held You"; 3. "It's All I Can Do"; 4. "Double Life"; 5. "Shoo Be Doo"; 6. "Candy-O"; Side two: 7. "Night Spots"; 8. "You Can't Hold on Too Long"; 9. "Lust for Kicks"; 10. "Got a Lot on My Head"; 11. "Dangerous Type"

"Night Spots" is a song by the Cars from their second studio album, Candy-O (1979). It was written by Ric Ocasek.

== Background ==
"Night Spots" was a leftover from The Cars' first album, The Cars. The original version, recorded around the time of The Cars, according to the Just What I Needed: The Cars Anthology liner notes, "has a sinister, stripped-down feel that anticipates the more experimental direction of later Cars music." This version remained unreleased until it appeared on the Just What I Needed: The Cars Anthology compilation album.

== Critical reception ==
"Night Spots" has generally received positive reception. AllMusic critic said that the band "rocks out on ... 'Night Spots'", and in the Billboard review of Candy-O, "Night Spots" was noted as one of the "best cuts". Rolling Stone critic Tom Carson said, "In 'Nightspots,' Greg Hawkes' synthesizer jabs and jumps like the flashing lights on a rainy, late-night highway, and the tune's hopped-up rhythms and stuttering singing have a tense, jittery momentum that's exactly right."

== Cover versions ==
- The Cautions covered "Night Spots" for the tribute album Substitution Mass Confusion: A Tribute to The Cars.
- Johny Dey covered the song for the tribute album Just What We Needed: A Tribute To The Cars.
