= Double Life (The Cars song) =

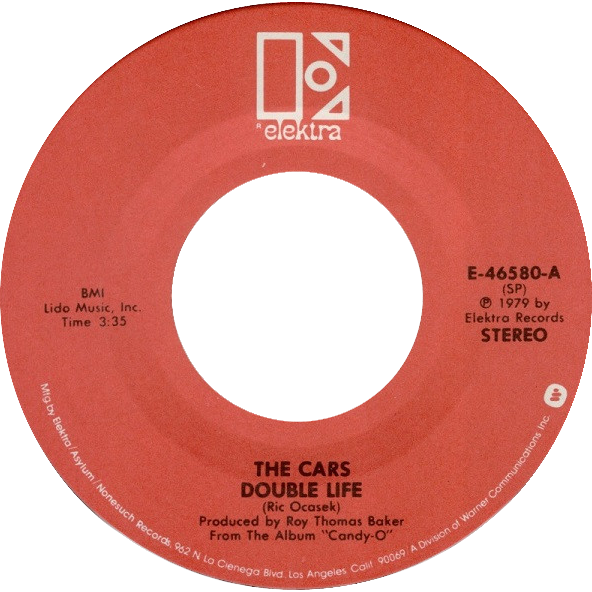
- US single A-side label

Single by the Cars

from the album Candy-O
- B-side: "Candy-O" (US); "Got a Lot on My Head" (UK); "It's All I Can Do" (Germany)
- Released: December 11, 1979
- Genre: New wave
- Length: 3:35
- Label: Elektra
- Songwriter: Ric Ocasek
- Producer: Roy Thomas Baker

The Cars singles chronology
"It's All I Can Do" (1979)	"Double Life" (1979)	"Touch and Go" (1980)

Candy-O track listing
- 11 tracks Side one: 1. "Let's Go"; 2. "Since I Held You"; 3. "It's All I Can Do"; 4. "Double Life"; 5. "Shoo Be Doo"; 6. "Candy-O"; Side two: 7. "Night Spots"; 8. "You Can't Hold on Too Long"; 9. "Lust for Kicks"; 10. "Got a Lot on My Head"; 11. "Dangerous Type"

"Double Life" is a single by the American rock band the Cars from their second album Candy-O. Written by Ric Ocasek, the song was almost left off the album. The song was released as the third single from the album in 1979, but did not chart.

== Background ==
"Double Life" was almost left off of Candy-O; Ric Ocasek recalled, "When one of my songs goes to the band in barest cassette form, we sit around and talk about it. If I'm outvoted, we don't do it. We almost didn't include 'Double Life' on the new album, it had been dropped." The first lines of the song, "It takes a fast car to lead a double life," are taken from the first two lines of a poem by Lawrence Ferlinghetti called "Lost Parents."

On the Candy-O album, this song segues via cross-fading into the next song, "Shoo Be Doo", which, in turn, segues into the album's title track. Aside from being in the same relative keys (C major and A minor), the two have nothing in common. This trick of connecting multiple songs by crossfading or short segueways tempted radio programmers, in the earlier days of radio, into playing more than one song from the album. Many stations had succumbed to this temptation in the sequencing of Side Two of the band's debut album (in which "You're All I've Got Tonight", "Bye Bye Love", "Moving in Stereo", and "All Mixed Up" were all lined up seamlessly).

A music video, featuring the band miming to the song, was also released. It was the 21st video to be played on the MTV's first day of broadcast on August 1, 1981.

== Composition ==
The song is sung by Ric Ocasek on the lead vocals, while the other band members provide a harmony bed of "Aah"s and the repeating refrain "It's all gonna happen to you."

Although the song begins with an A power chord, the song is in C Major, consisting primarily of C and F major chords, A minor chords, and the dominant, G7 chords.

The song features a brief guitar solo by lead guitarist Elliot Easton, who plays a number of high-speed solo licks over a musical background of G major. Some of his solo phrases end pointedly on F, the dominant seventh of G, reinforcing its role as the dominant seventh chord.

== Release and critical reception ==
"Double Life" was released as the third single from Candy-O in December 1979, with "Candy-O" on the B-side. Despite the previous two singles' chart success, "Double Life" failed to chart in the United States. "Double Life" has since appeared on the compilation, Just What I Needed: The Cars Anthology, and is around 12 seconds longer than the Candy-O version.

AllMusic reviewer Greg Prato states the song "embraces modern pop." Billboard described "Double Life" as "a throbbing midtempo cut featuring the band's characteristic nonchalant vocals and taut instrumentation." Record World said that it's characterized by "pulsating rhythm and choppy vocal phrasing" and said that a "whining guitar solo breaks the robot spell."
