= It's All I Can Do =

Single by the Cars

from the album Candy-O
- B-side: "Got a Lot on My Head"; "Candy-O" (UK)
- Released: September 25, 1979
- Genre: New wave; pop rock
- Length: 3:45
- Label: Elektra 46546
- Songwriter: Ric Ocasek
- Producer: Roy Thomas Baker

The Cars singles chronology
"Let's Go" (1979)	"It's All I Can Do" (1979)	"Double Life" (1979)

Candy-O track listing
- 11 tracks Side one: 1. "Let's Go"; 2. "Since I Held You"; 3. "It's All I Can Do"; 4. "Double Life"; 5. "Shoo Be Doo"; 6. "Candy-O"; Side two: 7. "Night Spots"; 8. "You Can't Hold on Too Long"; 9. "Lust for Kicks"; 10. "Got a Lot on My Head"; 11. "Dangerous Type"

"It's All I Can Do" is a song by the American rock band the Cars. It is the third track from their 1979 album Candy-O. It was written by the band's leader and songwriter Ric Ocasek, and features bassist Benjamin Orr on vocals.

== Sound and genre ==
"It's All I Can Do" is a new wave influenced pop rock song. According to Brett Milano, writer of the Just What I Needed: The Cars Anthology album notes "'It's All I Can Do' was an affecting, straight-ahead piece of romantic pop, give or take a line like 'When I was crazy, I thought you were great.'" The track was described as "gentle" by AllMusic reviewer Greg Prato, while Hamish Champ, writer of The 100 Best-Selling Albums of the 70s called the song "laidback". Music journalist Bill Janovitz described the song as having "big, layered backing vocals, beefy guitars, flutey synths and some classic lines like 'When I was crazy, I thought you were great.'"

Guitarist Elliot Easton felt his solo was "nice". He also said that drummer David Robinson "plays an inventive stutter-step beat."

The bass lines and the G major guitar riffs have a major rock feel, but the song is softened down with Benjamin Orr's vocals and Greg Hawkes keyboard and synth lines.

== Release ==
"It's All I Can Do" was released as the follow-up to the "Let's Go" single on September 25, 1979, backed with "Got a Lot on My Head" in the U.S. and Canada, and with "Candy-O" in Britain. Although the song did not reach the Top 20 standard of its predecessor, it reached number 41 on the Billboard Hot 100. A third and final single from Candy-O, "Double Life", failed to chart.

== Critical reception ==
"It's All I Can Do" has generally received positive reception from critics. Prato said that "'It's All I Can Do' ... deserved to be a hit," while Champ said the track (as well as its predecessor, "Let's Go,") "give ample evidence of the band's range." William Ruhlmann, author of The All-Music Guide to Rock, said "'It's All I Can Do' hit as well [as 'Let's Go']", and in the Billboard review of Candy-O, the song was chosen as one of the "best cuts". In a negative review, Tom Carson of Rolling Stone said, "'It's All I Can Do' calculatedly recycles the 'Just What I Needed' hook but to less-telling effect. It's simply cold." Billboard felt "It's All I Can Do" was less "dynamic and catchy" than "Just What I Needed" and "Let's Go," describing it as a "rocker with a simple melody line and spare instrumentation." Cash Box said it is "more subdued but equally intriguing" compared with "Let's Go" and said it has "infectious rhythms" and "sparse yet effective electronics." Classic Rock History critic Emily Fagan rated it as the Cars 5th best song sung by Orr, saying that the lyrics in the verses "speak to a relationship marked by disappointment and unfulfilled desire, while the chorus reinforces a sense of helplessness in the face of unresolved emotions." Ultimate Classic Rock critic Dave Swanson rated it as the 9th best Benjamin Orr Cars song, calling it "one of the Cars' most straightforward love songs and praising the "linear keyboard, simple drums and shiny yet gritty guitars."

== B-side ==
The B-side of "It's All I Can Do" is "Got a Lot on My Head", another track from Candy-O. In a review of Candy-O, AllMusic reviewer Greg Prato says the band "rocks out on 'Got a Lot on My Head' and 'Night Spots'".

== Other appearances ==
- "It's All I Can Do" was featured in the 1998 film The Wedding Singer, and included on the film's second soundtrack, titled Wedding Singer 2.
- Electronic rock/new wave revival band the Bravery covered the song in 2005 as the B-side to their single "Fearless". Their cover was later included in Substitution Mass Confusion: A Tribute to The Cars, a 2005 multi-artist collaborative album distributed by Not Lame Recordings.

== Personnel ==
- Benjamin Orr: Lead vocals, bass guitar
- Ric Ocasek: Rhythm guitar
- Elliot Easton: Lead guitar
- Greg Hawkes: Keyboard, synthesizer
- David Robinson: Drums

== Charts ==
=== Weekly charts ===
Weekly chart performance for "It's All I Can Do"
Chart (1979)	Peak position
Canada Top Singles (RPM)	17
US Billboard Hot 100	41
US Cash Box Top 100 Singles	40

=== Year-end charts ===
Year-end chart performance for "It's All I Can Do"
Chart (1979)	Position
Canada Top Singles (RPM)	131
