= Gimme Some Slack =

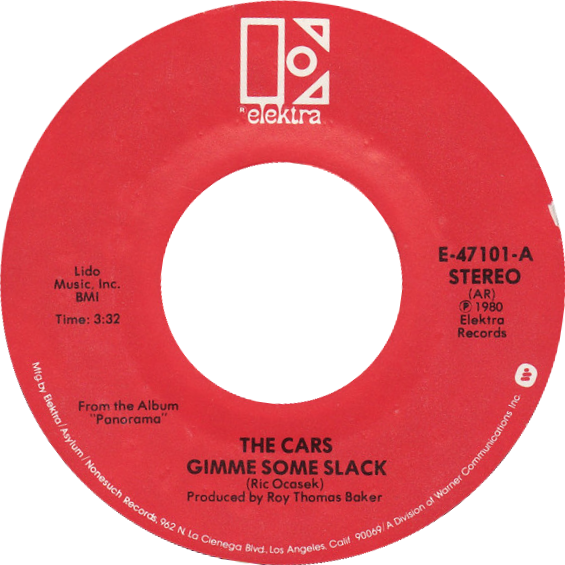
- US single A-side label

Single by the Cars

from the album Panorama
- B-side: "Don't Go to Pieces"
- Released: January 5, 1981
- Recorded: 1980
- Genre: New wave
- Length: 3:32
- Label: Elektra
- Songwriter: Ric Ocasek
- Producer: Roy Thomas Baker

The Cars singles chronology
"Don't Tell Me No" (1980)	"Gimme Some Slack" (1981)	"Shake It Up" (1981)

Panorama track listing
- 10 tracks Side one: 1. "Panorama"; 2. "Touch and Go"; 3. "Gimme Some Slack"; 4. "Don't Tell Me No"; 5. "Getting Through"; Side two: 6. "Misfit Kid"; 7. "Down Boys"; 8. "You Wear Those Eyes"; 9. "Running To You"; 10. "Up and Down"

"Gimme Some Slack" is a song by the American rock band the Cars from their third studio album Panorama (1980). The song was written by bandleader Ric Ocasek.

== Lyrics and music ==
The lyrics to "Gimme Some Slack" have a more concrete basis than many songs written by Ocasek. They are influenced by Ocasek's memories of the apartment building on the Lower East Side of Manhattan in which he lived in the early 1970s. Ocasek stated that "I remember people hanging clothes out on the roof and having all kinds of dirt in the hallway. So I'd think 'gimme some slack, gimme some rope, please.'" Jonathan Takiff of the Philadelphia Daily News points out that "Gimme Some Slack" and "Touch and Go" are examples of a "subtle, philosophical vision of first person survival" that represents an alternative side of the Cars from the "lost and frantic new age romantic" side exposed in songs like "Candy-O" and "Just What I Needed." One line of the lyrics, "Down at the end of Lonely Street", quotes Elvis Presley's "Heartbreak Hotel". Another line references the Greek playwright Euripides, which according to Ocasek contradicts the notion that the women referred to on the Panorama album are all femme fatales. According to Ocasek,

Euripides wrote about relationships between people. Back in those days, as far as most Greek men were concerned, women didn't have much value. Euripides was sometimes criticized by his contemporaries because...he advanced the idea that, yes, women did have some value.

Stuart Mungalies of The News stated that "Gimme Some Slack" sounds like a combination of the Rolling Stones and Devo. The four on the floor beat resembles that of Joy Division's song "Interzone" from their 1979 album Unknown Pleasures. According to music journalist Bill Janovitz, the beat and use of the hi hat "[exemplify] how rock bands incorporated disco" into their songs. Jim Bohen of the Daily Record described the music as starting with "revved up rhythm guitar" but then having a refrain on which it is difficult to find the groove. Ocasek biographer Peter Aaron described the music as "propulsive." Cars keyboardist Greg Hawkes plays both organ and saxophone on "Gimme Some Slack."

== Release and critical reception ==
"Gimme Some Slack" was first released on Panorama, and in 1981, the song was released as the third single from said album. However, the song failed to chart in any countries, making it one of the band's least successful singles. The song has since appeared on the compilation album Just What I Needed: The Cars Anthology.

Record World said that "the band hits a rhythm gallop over a steady dance beat" and that the song has "contagious keyboards." Daily Record critic Jim Bohen said that "it begins with revved-up rhythm guitar, then chokes on the chorus, daring you to sing along, to find the groove." Fresno Bee critic Don Mayhew said that "[keyboardist Greg] Hawkes grabs your attention by sounding off like a two-by-four against somebody's skull." Newsday critic Wayne Robins said that the song shows the Cars' "rigidity" and that the Cars "don't really have the firepower to rip off the Rolling Stones." Quad-City Times critic Greg Kot praised the guitar riff. Saginaw News critic Nancy Kuharevicz felt that the song was one of the few melodic songs on Panorama but that it was ruined by Ocasek's "disinterested" vocal and by the "pinball machine-like keyboard effects."

In his review of Panorama, AllMusic reviewer Greg Prato stated "'Gimme Some Slack' proved to be a fierce rocker." Prato also said, in his review of Just What I Needed: The Cars Anthology, that it was "previously released album tracks [on the album]" that were "highlights." In the Just What I Needed: The Cars Anthology liner notes, Brett Milano said, "Rockers like 'Getting Through' and 'Gimme Some Slack' had a heavier sound than before [Panorama]."

Boston Globe critic Steve Morse called "Gimme Some Slack" a "true masterpiece." Morse praises how the song "paints a seedily phantasmic portrait of a tenement building" with the lines "the seven floors of walkup/the odor musted cracks/the peeping keyhole introverts/with the monkeys on their backs/the rooftops strung with frauleins/the pastel pinned up sails/the eighteen color roses/against your face so pale." Morse suggests that the stream of consciousness style of the song was influenced by E.E. Cummings, Lawrence Ferlinghetti and Richard Brautigan.

== B-side ==
The B-side of the song, "Don't Go to Pieces", features Benjamin Orr on lead vocals. "Don't Go to Pieces" was first released as the B-side to "Don't Tell Me No", the single released before "Gimme Some Slack".

Ultimate Classic Rock critic Dave Swanson rated it as the 8th best Benjamin Orr Cars song, calling it "the best, yet least known, Cars song" and praising the "catchy guitar riff" and Orr's bass guitar part.
