= Touch and Go (The Cars song) =

Single by the Cars

from the album Panorama
- B-side: "Down Boys"
- Released: August 25, 1980
- Recorded: 1980
- Genre: New wave
- Length: 4:55 (album version); 3:41 (single version)
- Label: Elektra 47039
- Songwriter: Ric Ocasek
- Producer: Roy Thomas Baker

The Cars singles chronology
"Double Life" (1979)	"Touch and Go" (1980)	"Don't Tell Me No" (1980)

Panorama track listing
- 10 tracks Side one: 1. "Panorama"; 2. "Touch and Go"; 3. "Gimme Some Slack"; 4. "Don't Tell Me No"; 5. "Getting Through"; Side two: 6. "Misfit Kid"; 7. "Down Boys"; 8. "You Wear Those Eyes"; 9. "Running To You"; 10. "Up and Down"

"Touch and Go" is a song by American rock band the Cars from their third studio album Panorama (1980). The song was written and sung by bandleader Ric Ocasek.

== Lyrics and music ==
Philadelphia Daily News critic Jonathan Takiff described the lyrics as showing a "subtle, philosophical vision of first person survival." Ocasek said "This is one of those songs about people having a difficult relationship and not understanding why they're having problems, but they put up with the uncertainty anyway." He also said that the song asks "How far will you go before you figure out what you will and you won't accept in a relationship."

The song's verses feature the use of polymeter. The bass and drums are playing in a time signature of 5/4, while the vocals, keyboards, and guitar are playing in 4/4. The chorus is in pure 4/4. Charlotte News critic Carrington Thompson said that it "has an off-beat syncopation resembling reggae.

Music journalist Bill Janovitz called Elliot Easton's guitar solo a "masterpiece". The guitar solo was played over music similar to the chorus, but with some sections extended to give Easton more measures on the chords E minor, F major, and G major, to build his expansive, melodic solo which resolves to a C major seventh chord.

Ocasek said of Easton's guitar solo, "Elliot came into the studio one day during the sessions with the solo for 'Touch and Go' on a cassette. No music, just the solo. He'd recorded it by himself in his hotel room. When we put the solo on top of the track, it sounded great. Easton said of his solo, "That solo on 'Touch And Go,' I worked on in my hotel room while we worked on other parts. So, I came in with it already written and just recorded it." Originally the band thought it was too self-conscious to be included on the song but after Easton played several takes and became frustrated they said "Now it's great, before it sounded like you were thinking too much." Easton further said that "If there's any one trademark to my guitar style, it's that I like to tell a short story in my breaks with an intro, a high point, and a resolution. I like to make my statement and gracefully lead back to the verse, being aggressive, sweet, crying, or laughing. Ocasek came to say "There's a simplicity to the way it just hangs there, sort of offering a human balance to the high-tech backing."

== Release ==
"Touch and Go" was released as the debut single from Panorama. It reached number 37 on the US Billboard Hot 100 chart in 1980, making it the highest charting American single from Panorama. Its follow-up singles, "Don't Tell Me No" and "Gimme Some Slack" failed to chart.

"Touch and Go" has consistently appeared on many of the Cars' compilation albums, including Greatest Hits, Just What I Needed: The Cars Anthology, Complete Greatest Hits, Shake It Up & Other Hits, and The Essentials. Aside from Just What I Needed: The Cars Anthology, it is the only track from Panorama to appear on said albums.

== Music video ==
"Touch and Go" and "Panorama" were the Cars' first music videos. The Cars admired the humor of the videos that Chuck Statler directed for Devo, and Statler directed these two video for the Cars. In the "Touch and Go" video, the band plays their instruments in an unexpected setting, an amusement park. The amusement park scenes were filmed on the carousel and other rides at Whalom Park in Lunenburg, Massachusetts.

== Critical reception ==
"Touch and Go" has generally received positive reception from music critics. Billboard said that "After the jerky introduction a fluent slight '50-ish melody takes over", that it has "a strangely appealing change in rhythm midway through the song" and also praised the bass playing. Record World called it an "oddly affecting rocker [with] arty vocals delivering an effective hook between sharp rhythm shifts." Los Angeles Times critic Steve Pond described it as the album's "centerpiece", calling it a "mesmerizing, completely effective electronic shuffle." Daily Record critic Jim Bohen said that "the verses are delivered in an odd herky-jerky meter, and only on the chorus do things begin to flow." Muncie Star reviewer Kim Terverbaugh said that it combines "the best qualities from the past three decades of rock." Saginaw News critic Nancy Kuharevicz felt that the song is "a laugh at the whole urban cowboy syndrome."

AllMusic critic Greg Prato said the song was a standout on Panorama "which merges off-time keyboard flourishes with some great textural guitar work by Elliot Easton." Donald Guarisco, also of AllMusic, described the track as "a surprisingly straightforward ballad that became a minor hit for the group", also stating, "the melody is appropriately moody, consisting of attractive verses that hypnotically ebb and flow, a constantly ascending pre-chorus bridge that builds tension and a gorgeous call-and-response chorus that releases that tension", concluding that the song was "a sleek tune perfect for the car radio." Music critic Robert Christgau said that the song was one of the peaks of Panorama. Classic Rock History critic Brian Kachejian rated it as the Cars' 8th greatest song, stating that "The verse was defined by a robotic groove that would segue into a sweet summer-like swinging groove. It sounded like two separate songs, which is probably why we liked it."

=== John Lennon's opinion ===
Former Beatle John Lennon mentioned the song in his final interview on 8 December 1980, praising it for its 1950s sound and comparing it with his current record at the time, "(Just Like) Starting Over." He said, "I think the Cars' 'Touch and Go' is right out of the fifties 'Oh, oh...' A lot of it is fifties stuff. But with eighties styling, but, but... and that's what I think 'Starting Over' is; it's a fifties song made with an eighties approach."

== Charts ==
Chart performance for "Touch and Go"
Chart (1980)	Peak position
Australia (Kent Music Report)	62
Canada Top Singles (RPM)	16
New Zealand (Recorded Music NZ)	42
US Billboard Hot 100	37
US Cash Box Top 100 Singles	38
