= Panorama (The Cars song) =

Song by the Cars

from the album Panorama
- Released: August 15, 1980
- Genre: New wave
- Length: 5:42
- Label: Elektra
- Songwriter: Ric Ocasek
- Producer: Roy Thomas Baker

Panorama track listing
- 10 tracks Side one: 1. "Panorama"; 2. "Touch and Go"; 3. "Gimme Some Slack"; 4. "Don't Tell Me No"; 5. "Getting Through"; Side two: 6. "Misfit Kid"; 7. "Down Boys"; 8. "You Wear Those Eyes"; 9. "Running To You"; 10. "Up and Down"

"Panorama" is a 1980 song by American rock band the Cars from their third studio album, Panorama. It was written by Ric Ocasek. Despite not being released as a single, the song has since become "a cult favorite".

== Lyrics and music ==
"Panorama" is described by AllMusic writer Donald Guarisco as "one of Ric Ocasek's most direct love songs", with Ocasek singing "I just want to be in your panorama". Guarisco continued, saying that the music, however, "utilizes a quirky, up-tempo style, juxtaposing tense verses that veer high and low in a neurotic style with a more melodic chorus that dreamily descends from high to low in an alluring style."

Ocasek explained some of the lyrics as "The 'panorama of your life is the way things are going for you, the scene you are in. 'Sitting on your can can doing the panoram' means sitting around looking at things with a soft focus, not really knowing what's going on in your environment." The singer announces that takes whatever he wants.

"Panorama" begins with what music journalist Bill Janovitz described as "the icy throbbing pulse of a Suicide-like drum machine playing a bare-bones kick-and-snare pattern. The drum machine provides the rhythm throughout the song. Indiana-Penn critic Dave Steger said that it "lays down a bass and drum foundation that could easily belong to Electric Light Orchestra. However, it quickly breaks into the (lead singer) Ric Ocasek sneer paradoxically coupled with that Gary Numan-New Wave echoing (only in your mind) organ...The vocals aren't echoed but somewhat distorted in a quasi-Peter Frampton manner." According to Janowitz, "the hi-hat goes into hyperdrive as the song ends. There is no pretense that a human drummer could play like that. It's like rockabilly made by robots."

== Music video ==
Although "Panorama" did not see release as a single, a music video was filmed for the song. The video was directed by Chuck Statler, notable for directing the band Devo's early music videos, along with Devo co-founder Gerald Casale. It was shot in the Boston area. Ocasek biographer Peter Aaron described the video as being "based on the opening chase scenes of a German spy film" and Guarisco described it as "a fun spy film parody video." Cars biographer Toby Goldstein wrote that it was "an engrossing dramatic excursion that synchronized perfectly with the band's uneasiness concerning their work situation, where conspiracies seem to loom around every corner." The video ends with Ocasek being thrown out of a helicopter while in a fetal position, which Goldstein interprets as reflecting his "fatalistic, depressed attitude" at the time. The song "got some early MTV exposure". The video featured all five members of the band, as well as producer Roy Thomas Baker.

PopMatters critic Dennis Shin rated the video as one of "20 ’80S music videos that have aged terribly."

== Critical reception ==
AllMusic critic Greg Prato, reviewing the album, said, "standouts included the swirling title track that opens the album". Guarisco said that the track was "an entertainingly unconventional love song that fuses heartfelt sentiment with futuristic soundscapes." Rolling Stone critic Ken Tucker felt that lead guitarist Elliot Easton's "prancing, post-Beatles pop runs" on this song are "among the album's few authentic pleasures." Los Angeles Times critic Steve Pond said that the song sets up a "relentless, pulsating base and then shifts into blistering instrumental overdrive." Billboard rated it as one of the album's "best cuts".

Muncie Star reviewer Kim Terverbaugh felt it was a poor choice to open the album with because it "builds so slowly before reaching a nice climax." Fort Lauderdale News critic Cameron Cohick felt it was a Devo imitation, with a vocal that recalled Mark Mothersbaugh and structure that resembled "Jocko Homo", but with weaker lyrics. The Pittsburgh Press critic Pete Bishop felt it set the tone for the album with in being "starkly arranged with a thudding beat, long on Greg Hawkes' high, droning keyboards and short...on Elliot Easton's tasty guitar licks." Saginaw News critic Nancy Kuharevicz felt that in the song, Ocasek "plays the petulant adolescent, alternately pleading with and demanding of the girl of his dreams, without much apparent effect."

Writing in 2025, Janowitz stated that "1980 listeners might have found the surface and attack...somewhat offputting" with its "robotic rhythms and vocoder chants," and Krautrock-like soundscape. But by 2025 he felt that it just sounds like "an updated study in the blues."
