= Don't Tell Me No =

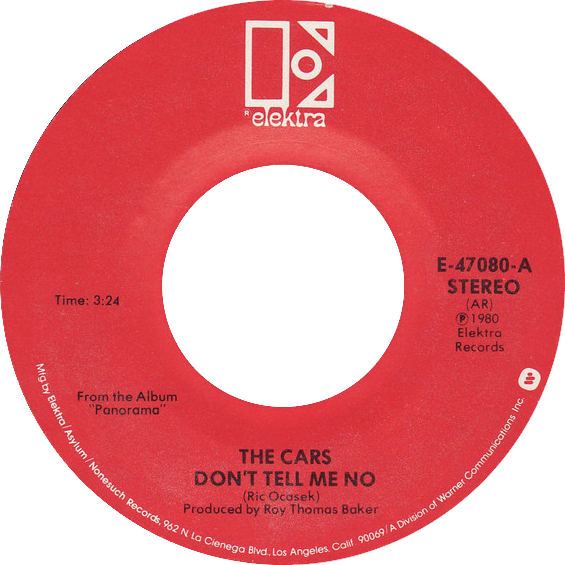
- US single A-side label

Single by the Cars

from the album Panorama
- B-side: "Don't Go to Pieces"
- Released: November 10, 1980
- Genre: New wave
- Length: 4:00 (album version); 3:24 (single version)
- Label: Elektra
- Songwriter: Ric Ocasek
- Producer: Roy Thomas Baker

The Cars singles chronology
"Touch and Go" (1980)	"Don't Tell Me No" (1980)	"Gimme Some Slack" (1980)

Panorama track listing
- 10 tracks Side one: 1. "Panorama"; 2. "Touch and Go"; 3. "Gimme Some Slack"; 4. "Don't Tell Me No"; 5. "Getting Through"; Side two: 6. "Misfit Kid"; 7. "Down Boys"; 8. "You Wear Those Eyes"; 9. "Running To You"; 10. "Up and Down"

"Don't Tell Me No" is a song by the American New wave band, the Cars. The song, written by Ric Ocasek, appeared on the band's third studio album, Panorama (1980).

== Background ==
Classic Rock History critic Emily Fagan described the lyrics as a "series of declarations" such as "It’s my party, you can come" and "It’s my life, have a half." To Fagan, the song is about personal freedom and rejecting conformity, and the line "Don’t tell me no" which is repeated throughout the song "is more than a catchy hook; it’s a powerful statement of independence." Fresno Bee critic Don Mayhew regarded the song's theme as "being with the 'in' crowd versus being left out; rejection as oppposed to...acceptance." Fagan described the music as combining the new wave sound of the Cars' earlier albums with a "more experimental, almost avant-garde approach."

"Don't Tell Me No" was recorded in April and May of 1980 with Roy Thomas Baker producer. Benjamin Orr sings lead vocals and plays bass guitar, Ocasek plays rhythm guitar, Elliot Easton plays lead guitar, Greg Hawkes plays synthesizer and David Robinson plays drums.

== Release and critical reception ==
"Don't Tell Me No" first saw release on the Panorama album in August 1980, but in November of that same year, the song was released as the follow-up single to the marginally successful "Touch and Go" single in America. However, unlike its predecessor, it failed to chart at all in said country.

AllMusic critic Greg Prato noted the track as an album highlight from Panorama, and went on to call it "strong, just not as well known as some of the other material [on the album]". Classic Rock History critic Emily Fagan rated it as the Cars 8th best song sung by Orr, saying that it "captures Benjamin Orr at his most assertive and nuanced, delivering a performance that combines melodic appeal with a defiant edge." Ultimate Classic Rock critic Dave Swanson rated it as the 10th best Benjamin Orr Cars song, praising the "forceful Benjamin Orr vocal riding on top of a slightly dark groove" and saying that the "electronic drums, which often add a dated element to records from this era, actually decorate this one nicely." Swanson also stated that although "Don't Tell Me No" "never really cuts loose or breaks the tension, it holds your ears nonetheless."

Though Benjamin Orr sings lead vocals on "Don't Tell Me No," Record World said that "A steamroller rhythm section has its own way here while steaming guitars and Ric Ocasek's trademark vocal detachment ride high." Billboard chose it as a "recommended" pick. Los Angeles Times critic Steve Pond praised the "insinuating hook." Muncie Star reviewer Kim Terverbaugh said that "David Robinson's drums perfectly punctuate 'Don't Tell Me No' with its multi-textured vocals." Saginaw News critic Nancy Kuharevicz felt that in the song, Ocasek "plays the petulant adolescent, alternately pleading with and demanding of the girl of his dreams, without much apparent effect." Kuharevicz also felt that with the "sneering vocal", the singer seems to thumb his nose at the group's fans.

== B-side ==
The song's B-side titled "Don't Go to Pieces", was also the B-side to "Gimme Some Slack". It includes rare backing vocals from lead guitarist Elliot Easton and keyboardist Greg Hawkes singing "You can make the switch, you can have your wish", followed by the band joining and singing the chorus "don't go to pieces, b-b-b-baby."

Swanson rated it as the 8th best Benjamin Orr Cars song, calling it "the best, yet least known, Cars song" and praising the "catchy guitar riff" and Orr's bass guitar part.
