= I'm Not the One =

Single by the Cars

from the album Shake It Up
- B-side: "Heartbeat City" (US); "Since You're Gone" (UK)
- Released: January 13, 1986
- Recorded: 1981
- Genre: New wave; synth-pop
- Length: 4:12 (album version); 4:07 (remix version)
- Label: Elektra 69569
- Songwriter: Ric Ocasek
- Producer: Roy Thomas Baker

The Cars singles chronology
"Tonight She Comes" (1985)	"I'm Not the One" (1986)	"You Are the Girl" (1987)

Shake It Up track listing
- 9 tracks Side one: 1. "Since You're Gone"; 2. "Shake It Up"; 3. "I'm Not the One"; 4. "Victim of Love"; 5. "Cruiser"; Side two: 6. "A Dream Away"; 7. "This Could Be Love"; 8. "Think It Over"; 9. "Maybe Baby"

"I'm Not the One" is a song by the American rock band the Cars, from their fourth studio album, Shake It Up (1981). It features Ric Ocasek on lead vocals, Benjamin Orr singing the 'you know why' phrase, and the whole group repeating "going round and round" as backing vocals throughout the song.

== Overview ==
"I'm Not the One" first appeared in 1981 on Shake It Up. In 1985, the song was remixed for the Greatest Hits album, emphasizing the drum track with added reverb. It was released as a single in 1986, following "Tonight She Comes", also from the Greatest Hits album. "I'm Not the One" debuted on the Billboard Top 40 chart on March 8, 1986, and peaked at number 32.

AllMusic reviewer Donald A. Guarisco described "I'm Not the One" as one of Shake It Up's "strongest and most memorable tunes", commenting that its sound still sounded fresh upon its 1986 re-release, five years after its first appearance on Shake It Up. Fellow Allmusic critic Tim Sendra said that it "barely sounds like the Cars; the electronic handclaps, massed backing vocals, and tinkling modern synths make it sound like adult contemporary daytime radio fodder." Cash Box called it a "laid back tune [that] may get new life from its single re-issue." Rolling Stone critic Rob Sheffield called it "the quintessential Ocasek combination: doom and gloom wrapped in a pop melody." The Sun critic Sadie Smith wrote that it "a pretty song that even though it is a ballad type song, it retains a rather strong beat for your average ballad."

The song is played in a scene from the 1995 comedy film Billy Madison, where the title character (Adam Sandler) reads Valentine's Day cards in third grade. Ultimate Classic Rock critic Bryan Wawzenek described it as a "modern rock radio favorite."

The song was sampled for the 2001 song "Thank You" by rapper Lil' Bow Wow.

In 2005, the album, Substitution Mass Confusion: A Tribute to The Cars, was released on Not Lame Recordings, which included a cover of "I'm Not the One" by Gigolo Aunts.

== Composition ==
The song's intro and choruses are in the key of B minor. The intro features two synthesizer parts layered on top of each other, one derived from Ric Ocasek's vocal melody, and the other a supporting counter-melody in a softer tone. The intro/chorus begins with a chord progression of B minor, F♯ minor, E minor, and A major, but is immediately followed with a reversal, F♯ minor to B minor, retaining the E minor to A major movement. After another "reversed" repeat, the E minor to A functions as a ii-V-I turnaround in the key's relative major of D.

The official sheet music folio lists the chord progression as D, to D/C, to D/B (enharmonic to a B minor seventh chord), to D/B♭ (enharmonic to a B♭ augmented major seventh chord), and video exists of Ocasek performing the song, solo on acoustic guitar, according to this progression. However, other transcriptionists describe the chord progression as D to D/C, to G/B, or to Gm/B♭. Either way, the last chord of the verse is a G minor sixth chord, in transition to the chorus in B minor. Each verse is introduced with a guitar melody from Elliot Easton, who layers several clean-tone guitar parts over the synthesizer-dominated arrangement. There is also a horn-like synthesizer solo by Greg Hawkes, played over the chorus progression.

== Charts ==
Chart performance for "I'm Not the One"
Chart (1986)	Peak position
Australia (Kent Music Report)	75
Canada Top Singles (RPM)	82
US Billboard Hot 100	32
US Adult Contemporary (Billboard)	24
US Mainstream Rock (Billboard)	29
US Cash Box Top 100 Singles	34
