= Brett Milano =

American music journalist (born 1957)

- Born: 1957 (age 68–69)
- Occupations: Writer, music journalist
- Website: www.brettmilano.com

Brett Milano (born 1957) is an American music critic, columnist and author, based in Boston.

== Early life ==
Milano attended Hampshire College in Amherst, Massachusetts, before relocating to Boston in 1980 and earning a graduate degree in journalism at Boston University. For three years in the early 1990s, he worked in Los Angeles doing A&R and publicity for Alias Records and Rhino Records. He also worked for Harmonix as a writer, editor, and researcher for its Rock Band video game.

== Music journalism and writing career ==
According to the Boston Globe, Milano is a veteran music critic whose 2007 book, The Sound of Our Town: A History of Boston Rock and Roll, "should be required reading for anyone interested in understanding Boston's unique contribution to rock 'n' roll."

Milano entered the Boston music scene in the 1980s as a music journalist. He was a long-time columnist for the Boston Phoenix, as well as the Boston Globe and Sound & Vision magazine. Milano has also written for publications such as Billboard, Pulse, and the College Media Journal. In 2013, he became the editor of OffBeat, where he has written about music since 2005.

Turning his hand to fiction, Milano is the author of two short stories anthologized in the 2011 and 2012 volumes of Tales from the House Band, a series of books edited by Deborah Grabien.

Milano has been interviewed in documentary films as an authority on rock music, and has written liner notes for albums by Todd Rundgren, the Cars, and the Smithereens. He compiled and annotated the 1993 Rhino Records CD release D.I.Y.: Mass. Ave: The Boston Scene (1975–83), a compilation of Boston punk history. His fourth book, a biography of Game Theory's Scott Miller, was published in October 2015.

== Books ==
=== The Sound of Our Town ===
The Boston Globe wrote that Milano's book The Sound of Our Town (2007) depicts Boston's "diversity of scenes and attitudes, much of it driven by the constant influx of college students and transplants", creating a "healthy dissonance" that defined the Boston rock sound.

The book was written over the course of two years, though Milano had been collecting material for several years beforehand. Milano's approach to the problem of structuring the book to reflect the typical chaos of a local music scene was "to at least give a mention to every great band I could ... without making it just a laundry-list of bands," in an effort to "catch the spirit of the time and places, and tell some of the more important band histories, and have it flow as a story."

=== Scott Miller biography ===
Milano's biography of Scott Miller, Don't All Thank Me at Once: The Lost Genius of Scott Miller, was published in October 2015. Milano described the book as one that not only tells the story of Miller and his bands Game Theory and The Loud Family, but also explores "the college and indie-rock explosion of the 1980s and 1990s," and how some influential artists "managed to fall through the cracks."

In the aftermath of Miller's death in April 2013, Milano submitted an initial proposal for a book about the album Lolita Nation to Bloomsbury, the publishers of the 33 1/3 book series. The series' editor rejected the topic as too non-commercial for that series, but provided "enough encouragement" that Milano decided to go further with the project, to write "a real proper biography, and try to get a handle on who Scott was and how that played into the music he made."

Explaining his motivations for writing the book, Milano stated, "Like a lot of people I was pretty shaken up by his sudden and self-inflicted death in 2013, and thought he should be honored in some way... there’s some earthshaking music here that I have to tell people about." Citing comparisons to Big Star and Nick Drake in a 2016 interview, Milano expressed his hopes and expectation that Miller's music will be rediscovered, bringing Miller "after-the-fact acclaim."

== Personal life ==
Milano continues to live in the Boston area, and was married in 2013.

Since September 2016, Milano and Rocker Magazine editor-in-chief Erin Amar have co-hosted a monthly rock and roll trivia night at various venues in the Boston area.

== Bibliography ==
Books:

- Boston Rock Trivia (1985) — with Clea Simon
- Vinyl Junkies: Adventures in Record Collecting (2003)
- The Sound of Our Town: A History of Boston Rock and Roll (2007)
- Don't All Thank Me at Once: The Lost Genius of Scott Miller (2015)
