= Candy-O (song) =

Song by the Cars

from the album Candy-O
- Released: June 13, 1979
- Recorded: 1979
- Studio: Cherokee (Hollywood, Los Angeles)
- Genre: New wave; hard rock
- Length: 2:36
- Label: Elektra
- Songwriter: Ric Ocasek
- Producer: Roy Thomas Baker

Candy-O track listing
- 11 tracks Side one: 1. "Let's Go"; 2. "Since I Held You"; 3. "It's All I Can Do"; 4. "Double Life"; 5. "Shoo Be Doo"; 6. "Candy-O"; Side two: 7. "Night Spots"; 8. "You Can't Hold on Too Long"; 9. "Lust for Kicks"; 10. "Got a Lot on My Head"; 11. "Dangerous Type"

"Candy-O" is the title-track of the second album by American rock band the Cars (1979). Written by Ric Ocasek, the song was not based on a real person. The song features a prominent guitar solo by Elliot Easton and lead vocals by bassist Benjamin Orr.

Though not released as a single, "Candy-O" has since become a fan favorite, being included on multiple compilation albums. The song has also been praised by critics for its songwriting and tight performance.

== Background ==
"Candy-O" was written by Ric Ocasek and sung by bassist Benjamin Orr. According to Ric Ocasek, "Candy-O" was not based on a specific person. In a band interview, Ocasek said, "I never knew any one Candy-O," to which Benjamin Orr joked, "[You] never told me about it." When asked by Bill Flanagan of Trouser Press magazine if the Candy-O title was a reference to "Ocasek", or "Orr", Ric Ocasek dryly replied, "The O stands for 'obnoxious'."

== Music ==
The style of the song is perhaps more guitar-heavy and less new wave-sounding than many Cars songs. The chorus is minimal, with only one line ("Candy-O / I need you so"), leading to loud guitar and drum fills dividing the rhythm less evenly. AllMusic reviewer Tom Maginnis has described the song as "slightly sinister", and one of the darkest and best songs from Candy-O, The Cars' second album. He also refers to Elliot Easton's "finest solo on the album, starting with a burst of speeding liftoff effects and then moving into Eddie Van Halen territory, ripping off a series of tight scorching trills that are quickly tucked into the next verse before wandering too close to '70s guitar virtuosity..."

== Release and reception ==
"Candy-O" was first released on the album of the same name in 1979, segued into by the preceding song on the album, "Shoo Be Doo." The song was released as the B-side to the single "Double Life," as well as "Let's Go" in France and Brazil. It was included on compilation albums such as Just What I Needed: The Cars Anthology and The Essentials.

"Candy-O" has seen positive critical reception from critics. Maginnis called the track "infectious" and called it "a prime example of a group of studio-savvy musicians making the most of the fresh sounds of the day without stifling their formidable songwriting and playing skills." Rolling Stone critic Tom Carson wrote that the song is "very nice, with some terse, churning guitar and a vocal just attenuated and yearning enough to make the heroine's coolness appear authentically felt instead of being merely presented." Ultimate Classic Rock ranked the song as the third best Benjamin Orr Cars song, calling it a "a short, but oh-so-sweet little rocker" and praising Easton's guitar solo as "superb." Classic Rock History critic Brian Kachejian rated it as the Cars' 4th greatest song, praising its originality and stating that "The way [lead guitarist] Elliot Easton and [keyboardist] Greg Hawkes bounced off each other with their licks and fills was mesmerizing." Classic Rock History critic Tony Scavieli rated it as the Cars all-time greatest song, calling it "the song that defined the sound and aura of the Cars." Rolling Stone rated it as one of the Cars' 17 essential songs, with critic Hank Shteamer saying that "The song takes just a handful of elements — an icy New Wave pulse, a bare-bones, almost blueslike structure, and boldly abstract lyrics — and turns them into two and a half minutes of captivating minimalist pop."

== Covers ==
"Candy-O" has been covered by such bands as the Melvins, whose 1989 album Ozma included a version of the song, described as a "random what-the-hell moment" that "shouldn't work, but actually does" by AllMusic reviewer Ned Raggett. The song has also been performed by the Todd Rundgren-led New Cars, who included a live version of it on their 2006 album It's Alive.

== Personnel ==
- Benjamin Orr: lead vocals, bass guitar
- Ric Ocasek: rhythm guitar
- Elliot Easton: lead guitar
- Greg Hawkes: keyboard, electric piano
- David Robinson: drums
