= Since You're Gone =

Single by the Cars

from the album Shake It Up
- B-side: "Think It Over" (US); "Maybe Baby" (UK)
- Released: March 8, 1982
- Recorded: 1981
- Studio: Syncro Sound, Boston
- Genre: New wave; rock
- Length: 3:30
- Label: Elektra 47433
- Songwriter: Ric Ocasek
- Producer: Roy Thomas Baker

The Cars US singles chronology
"Shake It Up" (1981)	"Since You're Gone" (1982)	"Victim of Love" (1982)

The Cars UK singles chronology
"Shake It Up" (1981)	"Since You're Gone" (1982)	"Think It Over" (1982)

Shake It Up track listing
- 9 tracks Side one: 1. "Since You're Gone"; 2. "Shake It Up"; 3. "I'm Not the One"; 4. "Victim of Love"; 5. "Cruiser"; Side two: 6. "A Dream Away"; 7. "This Could Be Love"; 8. "Think It Over"; 9. "Maybe Baby"

Music video
- "Since You're Gone" on YouTube

"Since You're Gone" is a song by the American rock band the Cars. It was released as the second single from their fourth album, Shake It Up.

== Composition ==
"Since You're Gone" is a power ballad about the breakup of a relationship. AllMusic critic Donald A. Guarisco praises the "inspired wordplay" of lyrics like "you're so treacherous/when it comes to tenderness" but also note the heartfelt quality of lyrics like "Since you're gone I never feel sedate/Since you're gone moonlight ain't so great." Music critic Jim Bohen describes the line "Since you're gone everything's in perfect tense" as an example of Ocasek's "literate wit." Boston Globe critic Steve Morse considers lines such as "since you're gone the nights are getting strange/since you're gone I'm throwing it all away/I can't help it everything's a mess" to be "trite." However, activist Phyllis Schlafly interprets some lines as encouraging suicide, where "life is not worth living after a loved one has gone."

The melody uses an unconventional style, but according to Guarisco the music "retains the emotional tone of the lyrics as it marries chant-like verses to a bridge built on ascending phrases that tug at the heart." According to the liner notes of Just What I Needed: The Cars Anthology, "Since You're Gone" is an example of "[a] more playful quality ... in Ocasek's writing", with a Bob Dylan impersonation where Morse states "...he apes Dylan's vocal phrasing." (e.g. the line: 'You're so treacher-ess!'). San Francisco Examiner contributor Michael Goldberg notes that despite the emotional theme of the song, Ocasek's vocal tone is detached, "almost as if he's discussing a computer that doesn't work anymore." On the other hand, Knight-Ridder Newspapers critic Keith Thomas describes Ocasek's singing as "impassioned". Guitarist Elliot Easton plays a guitar solo that "paid homage to King Crimson leader Robert Fripp." Thomas describes the guitars as "gutsy" and the synthesizers as "winding."

== Release ==
In 1982 "Since You're Gone" was released as the second single from Shake It Up, as the follow-up to "Shake It Up". The song, backed with "Think It Over" in America and "Maybe Baby" in Britain, reached #41 on the Billboard Hot 100 and #24 on the Billboard Mainstream Rock chart. The single was followed by "Victim of Love" in America, and "Think It Over" in Britain.

Like many other Cars songs, "Since You're Gone" had a music video created to accompany it, which starred Ric Ocasek "moping around an empty apartment". The video received adequate airplay on MTV at the time. According to Thomas, the video is one of the Cars' best.

== Critical reception ==
"Since You're Gone" has since been praised by many music critics. Billboard called it "a crafty uptempo track that has a catchy hook." Record World said that "a bass drone provides drama while percussion shakes create tension" and that it has a "catchy synthesizer melody line and punchy chorus hook." AllMusic critic Donald Guarisco described the song as "a solid showcase for [a strong balance between forward-thinking sounds and classic pop songwriting], using a high-tech arrangement and new wave irony to breathe new life into the power ballad", going on to call it "a solid fusion of rock ballad bombast and new wave futurism that charted just outside the pop chart Top 40." Greg Prato, also of AllMusic, said "the melancholic "Since You're Gone" remains one of Ocasek's best-ever tales of heartbreak". Thomas described it as "a pleasing pop tune." Classic Rock History critic Brian Kachejian rated it as the Cars' 10th greatest song, praising Ric Ocasik's vocals and saying that "it sounds like something that could have been released on one of the band’s first two albums." Classic Rock History critic Tony Scavieli rated it as the Cars’ 6th greatest song. Ultimate Classic Rock critic Nick DeRiso called it "a desperately weird tale of romantic nihilism" and said that "when Ric Ocasek lovingly chirps the line "you're so treacherous,' it sounds simultaneously hilarious and truly creepy – like maybe the last truly weird thing the Cars ever did."

== Charts ==
Chart performance for "Since You're Gone"
Chart (1982)	Peak position
UK Singles (OCC)	37
US Billboard Hot 100	41
US Mainstream Rock (Billboard)	24
US Cash Box Top 100 Singles	51
