= Syncro Sound =

Syncro Sound was a recording studio in Boston, Massachusetts, active from 1981 through 1986. It was owned by the Cars, who recorded their fourth studio album, Shake It Up (1981), there. Various other musicians, both nationally known and from the local scene, also had albums produced at Syncro.

The studio was located on Newbury Street in the posh Back Bay neighborhood. The space was previously occupied by Intermedia Sound, where Aerosmith and Jonathan Edwards both recorded their first albums. In 1982, the Washington Post described the refurbished brick row house, along with the fresh technology and décor inside -- "everywhere is the smell of newness."

A 2017 retrospective in The Boston Globe recounted how Cars frontman Ric Ocasek viewed the studio (whose door was unmarked) as a "clubhouse for creativity," in the vein of Andy Warhol's Factory. For a couple of years, it was quite an arty scene, with the likes of Bad Brains, Iggy Pop, and John Belushi hanging out. Ocasek produced Rock for Light for Bad Brains, whose penchant for smoking spliffs kept the local firehouse busy responding to alarms.

By the summer of 1983, however, the Cars had become absentee landlords. They chose not to record their Heartbeat City album at Syncro; rather, they went to London. The studio lost its luster, and worse, became unprofitable.

In December 1986, Billboard magazine announced that Syncro Sound was shutting its doors and that the facility would be sold.

== List of musical acts that recorded at Syncro Sound ==
- Bad Brains - Rock for Light
- Arthur Baker - remixes
- The Cars - Shake It Up
- Dave Edmunds
- Greg Hawkes - Niagara Falls
- Cyndi Lauper
- Ministry - With Sympathy
- New Models
- Ric Ocasek - Beatitude
- O Positive
- Duke Robillard
- Romeo Void - Never Say Never (EP)
- Sex Execs - Sex Train / Strange Things (12" single)
- George Thorogood
- Three Colors - One Big Tree (EP)
- 'Til Tuesday
- The Tubes
- Alan Vega - Saturn Strip
- Peter Wolf - Come as You Are
