= Shake It Up (The Cars album) =

1981 studio album by the Cars

Studio album by the Cars
- Released: November 6, 1981
- Recorded: 1981
- Studios: Syncro (Boston, Massachusetts)
- Genres: New wave; dance-rock; pop
- Length: 40:42
- Label: Elektra
- Producer: Roy Thomas Baker

The Cars chronology
Panorama (1980)	Shake It Up (1981)	Heartbeat City (1984)

Singles from Shake It Up
- 1. "Shake It Up" Released: November 9, 1981; 2. "Since You're Gone" Released: 1982; 3. "Victim of Love" Released: 1982; 4. "Think It Over" Released: 1982; 5. "I'm Not the One" Released: January 13, 1986

Shake It Up is the fourth studio album by American new wave band the Cars, released on November 6, 1981, by Elektra Records. It was the last Cars record to be produced by Roy Thomas Baker. A much more pop-oriented album than its predecessor, its title-track became the band's first top ten single on the U.S. Billboard Hot 100. Spin magazine included it on their "50 Best Albums of 1981" list.

== Critical reception ==
Professional ratings
Review scores
Source	Rating
AllMusic	3/5 stars
Robert Christgau	B
The Encyclopedia of Popular Music	3/5 stars
The Rolling Stone Album Guide	3.5/5 stars
Spin Alternative Record Guide	7/10

The Globe and Mail wrote that "Ric Ocasek and the boys have produced an understated and decidedly underwhelming package that makes no attempt to deviate from their patented, semi-robotic pop." The Boston Globe deemed the album "a conservative, cautious work that breaks no new ground." AllMusic critic Tim Sendra said, "Coming after the middling success of Panorama, it's not surprising that they swung back toward something more familiar; it's just too bad they didn't have the songs or production savvy to make it work."

== Track listing ==
All tracks are written by Ric Ocasek, except where noted.

Side one
No.	Title	Vocals	Length
1.	"Since You're Gone"	Ric Ocasek	3:30
2.	"Shake It Up"	Ocasek	3:32
3.	"I'm Not the One"	Ocasek	4:12
4.	"Victim of Love"	Ocasek	4:24
5.	"Cruiser"	Benjamin Orr	4:54

Side two
No.	Title	Writer(s)	Vocals	Length
1.	"A Dream Away"		Ocasek	5:44
2.	"This Could Be Love"	Greg Hawkes; Ocasek	Orr	4:26
3.	"Think It Over"		Orr	4:56
4.	"Maybe Baby"		Ocasek	5:04
Total length:				40:42

2018 reissue bonus tracks
No.	Title	Writer(s)	Vocals	Length
10.	"Since You're Gone" (early version)		Ocasek	5:57
11.	"Shake It Up" (demo)		Ocasek; Orr	4:10
12.	"I'm Not the One" (1985 remix from Greatest Hits)		Ocasek	4:10
13.	"Cruiser" (early version)		Ocasek	5:00
14.	"Take It On the Run" (early version of "A Dream Away")		Ocasek	6:19
15.	"Coming Up You Again" (1981 version of "Coming Up You")		Ocasek	5:22
16.	"The Little Black Egg" (from Just What I Needed: The Cars Anthology, 1995)	Chuck Conlon	Ocasek	2:54
17.	"Midnight Dancer" (demo, previously unreleased)		Orr	4:22

== Personnel ==
The Cars

- Ric Ocasek – rhythm guitar, vocals
- Elliot Easton – lead guitar, backing vocals
- Benjamin Orr – bass guitar, vocals
- David Robinson – drums, percussion
- Greg Hawkes – keyboards, backing vocals

Production

- The Cars – arrangements
- Roy Thomas Baker – producer
- Ian Taylor – recording
- Thom Moore – assistant engineer
- Walter Turbitt – assistant engineer
- George Marino – mastering at Sterling Sound (New York City, New York).
- David Robinson – cover design
- Clint Clemens – photography

== Charts ==
=== Weekly charts ===
Weekly chart performance for Shake It Up
Chart (1981–1982)	Peak position
Australian Albums (Kent Music Report)	20
Canada Top Albums/CDs (RPM)	7
Dutch Albums (Album Top 100)	40
New Zealand Albums (RMNZ)	12
US Billboard 200	9

=== Year-end charts ===
Year-end chart performance for Shake It Up
Chart (1982)	Position
Australian Albums (Kent Music Report)	86
Canada Top Albums/CDs (RPM)	49
U.S. Billboard 200	34

== Certifications ==
Certifications for Shake It Up
Region	Certification	Certified units/sales
United States (RIAA)	2× Platinum	2,000,000^{^}
^{^} Shipments figures based on certification alone.
