= Tonight She Comes =

Single by the Cars

from the album Greatest Hits
- B-side: "Just What I Needed"
- Released: October 14, 1985
- Genre: New wave
- Length: 3:52
- Label: Elektra
- Songwriter: Ric Ocasek
- Producers: The Cars; Mike Shipley

The Cars singles chronology
"Why Can't I Have You" (1985)	"Tonight She Comes" (1985)	"I'm Not the One" (1986)

Music video
- "Tonight She Comes" on YouTube

"Tonight She Comes" is a 1985 song by American rock band the Cars from their Greatest Hits album. It was released as a single in October 1985, reaching number seven on the Billboard Hot 100 in January 1986. The song reached number one on the Top Rock Tracks chart, where it stayed for three weeks.

== Background ==
"Tonight She Comes" was written by Cars singer and guitarist Ric Ocasek, who had originally intended to save the song for his solo career; however, the song was instead recorded as a standalone single. Ocasek recalled, "I was in the middle of recording my solo album and it was one of the songs I didn't use in the solo album at that point. That was like a one-off single that we just all came together and did."

== Composition ==
It is a straightforward, diatonic song in F major, with a guitar solo by Cars guitarist Elliot Easton. The solo was transcribed by Steve Vai in the February 1986 issue of Guitar Player magazine as the centerpiece to an interview with Easton.

In the interview, Easton described the custom-made Kramer guitar used for the solo, and said the reason the solo was "so dense" was due to the four weeks spent recording the single, which allowed Easton ample time to compose it. The title of the song is yet another Ocasek double entendre, although as Easton said, "It doesn't actually say that she reaches orgasm. It could mean that tonight she's coming over to make popcorn."

== Release and critical reception ==
"Tonight She Comes" was the Cars' fourth and last Top 10 hit. It was the first of two songs to be released as a single from their album of Greatest Hits. A remixed version of "I'm Not the One", previously recorded in 1981 for the album Shake It Up, was the second. A music video was made, and was put into heavy rotation on MTV.

Cash Box said that the song "captures the group’s technologically astute and emotionally problematic songwriting perspective." AllMusic critic Greg Prato, in his review of Greatest Hits, described the track as "playful", while Tim Sendra, also of AllMusic, said in his review of The Essentials that the track (among the others on said album), was "definitely essential".

== Charts ==
=== Weekly charts ===
Weekly chart performance for "Tonight She Comes"
Chart (1985–1986)	Peak position
Australia (Kent Music Report)	16
Canada Top Singles (RPM)	36
New Zealand (Recorded Music NZ)	20
UK Singles (Official Charts)	79
US Billboard Hot 100	7
US Mainstream Rock (Billboard)	1
US Adult Contemporary (Billboard)	36
US Cash Box Top 100 Singles	10

=== Year-end charts ===
Year-end chart performance for "Tonight She Comes"
Chart (1986)	Position
US Billboard Hot 100	81
US Mainstream Rock (Billboard)	15
US Cash Box Top 100 Singles	98
