= Let's Go (The Cars song) =

- Picture sleeve (France)

Single by the Cars

from the album Candy-O
- B-side: "That's It"; "Candy-O"
- Released: June 12, 1979
- Recorded: 1979
- Genre: New wave; pop rock; rock and roll
- Length: 3:32
- Label: Elektra
- Songwriter: Ric Ocasek
- Producer: Roy Thomas Baker

The Cars singles chronology
"Good Times Roll" (1979)	"Let's Go" (1979)	"It's All I Can Do" (1979)

Candy-O track listing
- 11 tracks Side one: 1. "Let's Go"; 2. "Since I Held You"; 3. "It's All I Can Do"; 4. "Double Life"; 5. "Shoo Be Doo"; 6. "Candy-O"; Side two: 7. "Night Spots"; 8. "You Can't Hold on Too Long"; 9. "Lust for Kicks"; 10. "Got a Lot on My Head"; 11. "Dangerous Type"

Audio sample
- "Let's Go": file; help

"Let's Go" is a song by American rock band the Cars, written by Ric Ocasek for the band's second studio album, Candy-O (1979). A new wave, pop rock and rock and roll song, its hook was inspired by the Routers. The song's vocals are performed by bassist Benjamin Orr.

"Let's Go" was released in 1979 as the debut single from Candy-O on Elektra Records. The single was a chart success, reaching number 14 in the United States and charting in multiple other countries. It has since appeared on several compilation albums and has seen critical acclaim.

It was the 100th video to be played on the first day of MTV on August 1, 1981.

== Composition ==
"Let's Go" was described by Brett Milano as "another double-edged anthem" in the liner notes for Just What I Needed: The Cars Anthology. Classic Rock History critic Emily Fagan said that the lyrics "while seemingly straightforward, offer a glimpse into the complex interplay of attraction and cool detachment that became a hallmark of The Cars' sound."

The song's signature hook is a series of claps followed by a shouted "Let's go!", which is derived from the 1962 song "Let's Go (Pony)" by the Routers, as well as a simple synth melody played by Greg Hawkes, using the Sync II lead preset (or a slight variation of it) from a Prophet-5 synthesizer. The song tells the story of a 17-year-old girl and her budding interest in "the nightlife". The song's themes include "youthful desire and the elusive chase of love."

== Release ==
"Let's Go" was released as the debut single from Candy-O in June 1979. The song's B-side is a non-album track titled "That's It" that features Benjamin Orr on lead vocals. The single peaked at number 14 on the Billboard Hot 100 singles chart in the US, making it the first song by The Cars to reach the Billboard top 20. The song was an even bigger success elsewhere, hitting the top 10 in multiple countries. In Canada, the track reached #5, and remains the Cars' highest ever charting single in that country. Similarly, "Let's Go" peaked at #6 in Australia, where it remains The Cars' highest charted hit.

Two follow-up singles from Candy-O, "It's All I Can Do" and "Double Life", were released after "Let's Go". Although "It's All I Can Do" was a minor hit, "Double Life" failed to chart.

== Critical reception ==
Rolling Stone critic Tom Carson described "Let's Go" as "the best cut on Candy-O, while the Billboard review of Candy-O listed the song as one of the "best cuts". Billboard described the song as a "catchy midtempo number" with a guitar-driven "sassy rock sound." Cash Box said it begins "with a crash, moving into a streamlined pop rocker, filled with a futuristic combination of synthesizer blips, handclaps and crunching guitar chording." Record World said that "All the parts are geared for hit status on this fine-tuned mid-tempo rocker." The Fort Worth Star Telegram rated it to be the 8th best single of 1979. Classic Rock History critic Emily Fagan rated it as the Cars 3rd best song sung by Orr, saying that it "encapsulates the band’s knack for blending new wave cool with rock 'n' roll swagger." Ultimate Classic Rock critic Dave Swanson rated it as the 6th best Benjamin Orr Cars song, saying that "the simple keyboard line, crunchy guitars and driving rhythm make for a great pop song."

William Ruhlmann, author of The All-Music Guide to Rock, said, "'Let's Go' (the Cars' biggest hit so far) became one of the summer songs of the year," and Hamish Champ, writer of The 100 Best-Selling Albums of the 70s, said the track (as well as its follow-up, "It's All I Can Do"), "give ample evidence of the band's range". AllMusic reviewer Greg Prato said the song was "intensely fun".

== Charts ==
=== Weekly charts ===
Weekly chart performance for "Let's Go"
Chart (1979)	Peak position
Australia (Kent Music Report)	6
Canada Top Singles (RPM)	5
New Zealand (Recorded Music NZ)	40
UK Singles (Official Charts)	51
US Billboard Hot 100	14
US Cash Box Top 100 Singles	14

=== Year-end charts ===
Year-end chart performance for "Let's Go"
Chart (1979)	Position
Australia (Kent Music Report)	41
Canada Top Singles (RPM)	49
US Cash Box Top 100 Singles	96
US (Joel Whitburn's Pop Annual)	102
