= Shake It Up (The Cars song) =

Single by the Cars

from the album Shake It Up
- B-side: "Cruiser"
- Released: November 17, 1981 (Charted on December 5)
- Recorded: 1981
- Studio: Syncro Sound (Boston)
- Genre: New wave; power pop; art punk
- Length: 3:32
- Label: Elektra
- Songwriter: Ric Ocasek
- Producer: Roy Thomas Baker

The Cars singles chronology
"Gimme Some Slack" (1981)	"Shake It Up" (1981)	"Since You're Gone" (1982)

Shake It Up track listing
- 9 tracks Side one: 1. "Since You're Gone"; 2. "Shake It Up"; 3. "I'm Not the One"; 4. "Victim of Love"; 5. "Cruiser"; Side two: 6. "A Dream Away"; 7. "This Could Be Love"; 8. "Think It Over"; 9. "Maybe Baby"

Music video
- "Shake It Up" on YouTube

"Shake It Up" is a song by American rock band the Cars from their fourth studio album of the same name (1981). It was released in mid November, 1981, as the album's lead single. Although appearing for the first time in 1981, it was actually written years earlier by the band's songwriter and lead singer Ric Ocasek. The song became one of the Cars' most popular songs, peaking at number four on the Billboard Hot 100 and number two on the Billboard Top Tracks chart in early 1982. With the track "Cruiser" as its B-side, it reached number 14 on the Billboard Disco Top 80 chart.

== Background ==
Drummer David Robinson said at first, he did not even want to record the song, as it was "kicking around for years. It never sounded good. We recorded it a couple of times in the studio and dumped it, and we were going to try it one more time, and I was fighting everybody . . . So we thought, let's start all over again, like we've never even heard it—completely change every part—and we did. Then, when it was through and all put back together, it was like a brand-new song."

Guitarist Elliot Easton said he wanted his solo to sound like "two guys trading off". He first plays a Fender Telecaster, in a style skewing country, then midway through the solo switches to a Gibson guitar for a heavier rock sound.

== Composition and lyrics ==
"Shake It Up" is a danceable new wave, power pop and art punk song, which Ocasek referred as "the big return to pop" after the more experimental style of the preceding album, Panorama. The song references dance moves, hair styles and having fun. However, bassist and singer Benjamin Orr has stated the song tells the story of how important it is to make a mark in life, to "let them know what you really mean".

Ocasek has since dismissed the song's lyrics, saying, "I'm not proud of the lyrics to 'Shake It Up.'"

== Critical reception ==
Billboard said that "Ric Ocasek's vocals are surrounded by a steady guitar/keyboard beat that has a mesmerizing effect." Record World said that "A rapid-pulse rhythm supports melodic keyboard enchantment, stinging guitars and an undeniable chorus hook."

== Charts ==
=== Weekly charts ===
1982 weekly chart performance for "Shake It Up"
Chart (1982)	Peak position
Australia (Kent Music Report)	10
Canada Top Singles (RPM)	7
Netherlands (Dutch Top 40 Tipparade)	3
Netherlands (Single Top 100)	48
New Zealand (Recorded Music NZ)	26
US Billboard Hot 100	4
US Dance Club Songs (Billboard) with "Cruiser"	14
US Mainstream Rock (Billboard)	2
US Cash Box Top 100 Singles	3

2019 weekly chart performance for "Shake It Up"
Chart (2019)	Peak position
US Rock Digital Song Sales (Billboard)	21

=== Year-end charts ===
Year-end chart performance for "Shake It Up"
Chart (1982)	Position
Australia (Kent Music Report)	71
Canada Top Singles (RPM)	56
US Billboard Hot 100	23
US Cash Box Top 100 Singles	23
