= Panorama (The Cars album) =

1980 studio album by the Cars

Studio album by the Cars
- Released: August 15, 1980
- Recorded: April–May 1980
- Studios: Cherokee (Hollywood, Los Angeles); The Power Station (New York City)
- Genres: New wave; art rock; pop rock; synth rock
- Length: 40:09
- Label: Elektra
- Producer: Roy Thomas Baker

The Cars chronology
Candy-O (1979)	Panorama (1980)	Shake It Up (1981)

Singles from Panorama
- 1. "Touch and Go" Released: August 25, 1980; 2. "Don't Tell Me No" Released: November 10, 1980; 3. "Gimme Some Slack" Released: January 5, 1981

Panorama is the third studio album by American new wave band the Cars, released on August 15, 1980, by Elektra Records. Like its predecessors, it was produced by Roy Thomas Baker and released on Elektra Records.

== Background ==
The record marked a change from the upbeat pop rock and hard rock of the band's previous studio albums, representing a more aggressive and experimental sound. Billboard said that while Panorama retained the Cars' minimalist approach from their eponymous debut studio album, it sounded sufficiently different to avoid having the band sound like a caricature of itself.

Panorama peaked at No. 5 on the U.S. Billboard 200 and has been certified platinum by the Recording Industry Association of America (RIAA). The album's lead single, "Touch and Go", reached No. 37 on the Billboard Hot 100.

== Critical reception ==
Professional ratings
Review scores
Source	Rating
AllMusic	3.5/5 stars
Robert Christgau	B−
The Encyclopedia of Popular Music	2/5 stars
Pitchfork	8.0/10
The Rolling Stone Album Guide	2/5 stars
Spin Alternative Record Guide	2/10

Rolling Stone critic Ken Tucker said that "Panorama isn't merely a joyless joyride, it's an out-and-out drag." Robert Christgau claimed that the album's problem is "boredom with formula" and said that "This is longer, slower and denser [than previous Cars' studio albums], with lyrics that skirt social commentary and music that essays textural pretension. Spin Alternative Record Guide deemed the album "a dry, monotonous Wire imitation." Critic Keith Roysdon said that "The entire album is a plea from a man's point of view for love and/or sex from a woman. The fact that 'he', the narrator, is getting neither accounts for the depressing tone of the LP." Roysdon also found the album repetitious, saying that "Songwriter Ric Ocasek has written some fairly good numbers, but they sound alike, with just a few exceptions." Daily Herald-Tribune critic Ethlie Ann Vare said that it lacked the "hard rocking edge" from the Cars' first two studio albums and that it "slops over into muddy techno-pop." Quad-City Times critic Greg Kot said that the album "overdoses on Ric Ocasek's too chic, too nebulous lyrics and Roy Thomas Baker's intrusive production" and that "Ocasek and the band build tension but the climaxes never arrive" resulting in an album that "fails as rock 'n' roll." The Pittsburgh Press's critic Pete Bishop felt it had "an undue amount of menace and too little melody and snap in the music." The Saginaw News' critic Nancy Kuharevicz called it a "stark, almost anti-musical album" and said that "When Ocasek isn't moaning like a whiny, jilted adolescent, he's repetitiously droning pat phrases which range from trite to abtruse." Critic Stuart Margulies called it "shockingly boring, unmelodic and senseless."

The Boston Globe's critic Steve Morse called it "a tour de force of high-tech strategy" that "ushers in a potpourri of new sound textures." The State Journal critic Archer Prewitt said that "every song is good" and that "No one song is similar to another and each has an irrestible characteristic that leave you humming." Los Angeles Times critic Steve Pond criticized the album's lack of hooks compared to previous Cars' studio albums but felt that the new approach also yielded some benefits, concluding that "lapses notwithstanding, it's still one of the best rides in town."

== Track listing ==
All tracks are written by Ric Ocasek, except where noted.

Side one
No.	Title	Vocals	Length
1.	"Panorama"	Ocasek	5:42
2.	"Touch and Go"	Ocasek	4:55
3.	"Gimme Some Slack"	Ocasek	3:32
4.	"Don't Tell Me No"	Benjamin Orr	4:00
5.	"Getting Through"	Ocasek	2:35

Side two
No.	Title	Vocals	Length
6.	"Misfit Kid"	Ocasek	4:30
7.	"Down Boys"	Orr	3:08
8.	"You Wear Those Eyes"	Orr; Ocasek	4:55
9.	"Running to You"	Orr	3:22
10.	"Up and Down"	Ocasek	3:31
Total length:			40:09

2017 remastered reissue bonus tracks
No.	Title	Writer(s)	Vocals	Length
11.	"Shooting for You" (previously unreleased)		Orr	4:04
12.	"Be My Baby" (early version of "Maybe Baby")		Ocasek	5:00
13.	"The Edge" (previously unreleased)		Orr	3:26
14.	"Don't Go to Pieces" (B-side of "Don't Tell Me No" and "Gimme Some Slack")	Ocasek; Greg Hawkes	Orr	4:04

== Personnel ==
Credits adapted from the liner notes of Panorama.

The Cars

- Ric Ocasek – vocals, rhythm guitar
- Benjamin Orr – vocals, bass guitar
- Elliot Easton – lead guitar, backing vocals
- David Robinson – drums, backing vocals
- Greg Hawkes – keyboards, saxophones, backing vocals

Technical

- Roy Thomas Baker – production
- Ian Taylor – engineering
- John Weaver – engineering assistance
- Jason Corsaro – engineering assistance
- Thom Moore – production assistance

Artwork

- David Robinson – cover design
- Paul McAlpine – photography

== Charts ==
=== Weekly charts ===
Weekly chart performance for Panorama
Chart (1980)	Peak position
Australian Albums (Kent Music Report)	19
Canada Top Albums/CDs (RPM)	10
Japanese Albums (Oricon)	69
New Zealand Albums (RMNZ)	14
US Billboard 200	5

=== Year-end charts ===
Year-end chart performance for Panorama
Chart (1980)	Position
Canada Top Albums/CDs (RPM)	55

== Certifications ==
Certifications for Panorama
Region	Certification	Certified units/sales
United States (RIAA)	Platinum	1,000,000^{^}
^{^} Shipments figures based on certification alone.
