= Candy-O =

1979 studio album by the Cars

Studio album by the Cars
- Released: June 2, 1979
- Recorded: 1979
- Studio: Cherokee (Hollywood, Los Angeles)
- Genres: Pop; new wave; rock
- Length: 36:25
- Label: Elektra
- Producer: Roy Thomas Baker

The Cars chronology
The Cars (1978)	Candy-O (1979)	Panorama (1980)

Singles from Candy-O
- 1. "Let's Go" Released: June 12, 1979; 2. "It's All I Can Do" Released: September 25, 1979; 3. "Double Life" Released: December 12, 1979

Candy-O is the second studio album by American new wave band the Cars, released on June 2, 1979, by Elektra Records.

Produced by Roy Thomas Baker, the album spawned two singles, "Let's Go" and "It's All I Can Do". The album outperformed the band's debut, peaking at No. 3 on the U.S. Billboard 200. The cover art was painted by Peruvian-American pin-up artist Alberto Vargas.

== Background ==
Unlike their debut studio album, Candy-O was created under a more democratic approach. Ric Ocasek said of this, "When one of my songs goes to the band in barest cassette form, we sit around and talk about it. If I'm outvoted, we don't do it. We almost didn't include 'Double Life' on the new album, it had been dropped. I think everybody in the Cars is open-minded and creative enough that they would do anything – nobody's holding anything back. Everybody appreciates the more radical, experimental kinds of music and likes it. But sometimes, when you're put together with five pieces, things are not as minimal as they could or should be. Everybody's developed a unique personal style, and we rely on their input. If they did it, it's good enough."

Most of the songs on Candy-O were written after the release of The Cars, meaning that most of the leftovers from the first album (including the popular encore "Take What You Want") were scrapped; "Night Spots", a reject from the first album, was still included.

For the album, the band once again worked with Queen producer Roy Thomas Baker. Ocasek said of their relationship with the producer, "Well, some of the things on that first album that we thought were a little slick, we toned down on the second, like on the background vocals. But if we were going to rely on the producer we had hired, there was no reason to try and change him. On the second album, it was easier to say, 'Roy, let's not do the multi-tracked harmonies this time.'"

The band's label, Elektra, initially wanted to hold back the release of the album, but the band stood their ground. Ocasek said of this, "At first Elektra wanted to hold it back some, but we told them there was no way, because if they were going to hold that back, they were going to hold us back, and we can't just sit around and be held back." Released as the follow-up to their debut studio album The Cars (1978), Candy-O peaked at No. 3 on the Billboard 200. The album re-entered the charts at No. 179 in 1984. The record was also ranked No. 82 on Billboard's "Top Albums of the Year" chart for 1979.

Three singles were lifted from Candy-O: "Let's Go" reached No. 14, making it the first top 20 Cars single, "It's All I Can Do" peaked at No. 41, barely missing the top 40, and "Double Life" failed to chart.

== Cover art ==
The album cover was painted by Peruvian-American artist Alberto Vargas, who was known for his paintings of pin-up girls that appeared in Esquire and Playboy magazines in the 1940s through the 1960s. The idea to hire Vargas came from drummer David Robinson, the band's visual director and a collector of pin-ups. The 83-year-old Vargas had retired several years earlier at least in part due to the death of his wife. According to Johnny Lee, Vargas was persuaded to take the assignment by his great-niece who was a fan of the Cars. The painting, depicting a woman sprawled across the hood of a Ferrari 365 GTC/4, was based on a photo shoot directed by Robinson at a Ferrari dealership. The model, coincidentally named Candy Moore, briefly dated Robinson afterward.

=== Candy Moore ===
Candy Moore, a model and actress who appeared in the sex comedy film Lunch Wagon (1981), is often confused with an actress of the same name who starred in The Lucy Show and married actor Paul Gleason. The case of incorrect identity is pervasive throughout the Internet, having The Lucy Show actress often linked to, and credited with, the work of the model found on the Cars' album. The Candy Moore from the cover of the Candy-O album can also be found wearing a red shirt on the cover of Rick James' fifth studio album Street Songs (1981), and on subsequent sleeves for his singles such as "Ghetto Life". Other shots of the model during the Candy-O cover shoot can be found in a video interview with David Robinson.

== Critical reception ==
Professional ratings
Review scores
Source	Rating
AllMusic	4.5/5 stars
The Encyclopedia of Popular Music	3/5 stars
Pitchfork	8.5/10
The Rolling Stone Album Guide	4.5/5 stars
Smash Hits	8/10
Spin Alternative Record Guide	9/10
The Village Voice	B+

Candy-O was positively received by critics. Harry Sumrall of The Washington Post praised the album as "invigorating and enlightening" and found that Ocasek's songs possessed a "certain adolescent charm" while avoiding "any direct allusions to '50s rock 'n' roll." Village Voice critic Robert Christgau summarized the album as follows: "Cold and thin, shiny and hypnotic, it's what they do best—rock and roll that is definitely pop without a hint of cuteness".

Rolling Stone writer Tom Carson was more reserved in his praise, writing, "It's almost inevitable that Candy-O, the Cars' second album, doesn't seem nearly as exciting as their first. The element of surprise is gone, and the band hasn't been able to come up with anything new to replace it. Candy-O is an elaborately constructed, lively, entertaining LP that's packed with good things. And it's got a wonderful title. But it's a little too disciplined, a shade too predictable."

=== Retrospective reception ===
In a retrospective review, AllMusic critic Greg Prato said that while Candy-O "was not as stellar" as The Cars, "it did contain several classics, resulting in another smash album that solidified the band's standing as one of the most promising new bands of the late '70s." Stephen Thomas Erlewine of Pitchfork wrote: "Take Candy-O, which followed their debut by almost exactly a year. Superficially, the album offers another dose of stylish, detached pop with hooks so finely honed, they may have come off an assembly line. Listen closely, though, and Candy-O boasts bolder production that emphasizes the band's heavy attack and gives plenty of space for guitarist Elliot Easton to spin out composed solos. It sounds not just like new wave—the umbrella term for any pop-oriented counterculture music that arose in the wake of punk—but album rock."

Hamish Champ, writer of The 100 Best-Selling Albums of the 70s, said: "With UK producer Roy Thomas Baker once again behind the decks, Ric Ocasek and his colleagues produced a follow-up to their hugely successful debut with more of the same quirky, offbeat songs that had caused such a stir the first time around."

== Track listing ==
All tracks are written by Ric Ocasek.

Side one
No.	Title	Vocals	Length
1.	"Let's Go"	Benjamin Orr	3:32
2.	"Since I Held You"	Ocasek; Orr	3:16
3.	"It's All I Can Do"	Orr	3:46
4.	"Double Life"	Ocasek	4:11
5.	"Shoo Be Doo"	Ocasek	1:41
6.	"Candy-O"	Orr	2:37

Side two
No.	Title	Vocals	Length
7.	"Night Spots"	Ocasek	3:14
8.	"You Can't Hold On Too Long"	Orr	2:47
9.	"Lust for Kicks"	Ocasek	3:52
10.	"Got a Lot on My Head"	Ocasek	2:59
11.	"Dangerous Type"	Ocasek	4:30
Total length:			36:25

2017 reissue bonus tracks
No.	Title	Vocals	Length
12.	"Let's Go" (monitor mix)	Orr	3:33
13.	"Candy-O" (Northern Studios version)	Orr	2:35
14.	"Night Spots" (Northern Studios version)	Ocasek	3:43
15.	"Lust for Kicks" (monitor mix)	Ocasek	4:25
16.	"Dangerous Type" (Northern Studios version)	Ocasek	3:26
17.	"They Won't See You" (Northern Studios version)	Ocasek	3:49
18.	"That's It" (B-side of "Let's Go")	Orr	3:23

== Personnel ==
Credits adapted from the liner notes of Candy-O.

=== The Cars ===
- Ric Ocasek – vocals, rhythm guitar
- Benjamin Orr – vocals, bass guitar
- Elliot Easton – lead guitar, backing vocals
- Greg Hawkes – keyboards, percussion, saxophone, backing vocals
- David Robinson – drums, percussion

=== Technical ===
- Roy Thomas Baker – production
- Geoff Workman – engineering
- George Tutkov – engineering assistance
- George Marino – mastering at Sterling Sound (New York City)

=== Artwork ===
- Ron Coro – art direction, design
- Johnny Lee – art direction, design
- David Robinson – cover concept
- Alberto Vargas – cover painting
- Jeff Albertson – photography

== Charts ==
=== Weekly charts ===
Weekly chart performance for Candy-O
Chart (1979)	Peak position
Australian Albums (Kent Music Report)	7
Canada Top Albums/CDs (RPM)	4
New Zealand Albums (RMNZ)	6
UK Albums (Official Charts)	30
US Billboard 200	3

=== Year-end charts ===
1979 year-end chart performance for Candy-O
Chart (1979)	Position
Australian Albums (Kent Music Report)	26
Canada Top Albums/CDs (RPM)	6
New Zealand Albums (RMNZ)	20
US Billboard 200	82

1980 year-end chart performance for Candy-O
Chart (1980)	Position
Canada Top Albums/CDs (RPM)	85
US Billboard 200	32

== Certifications ==
Certifications for Candy-O
Region	Certification	Certified units/sales
United States (RIAA)	4× Platinum	4,000,000^{^}
^{^} Shipments figures based on certification alone.
