= Charlie Daniels discography =

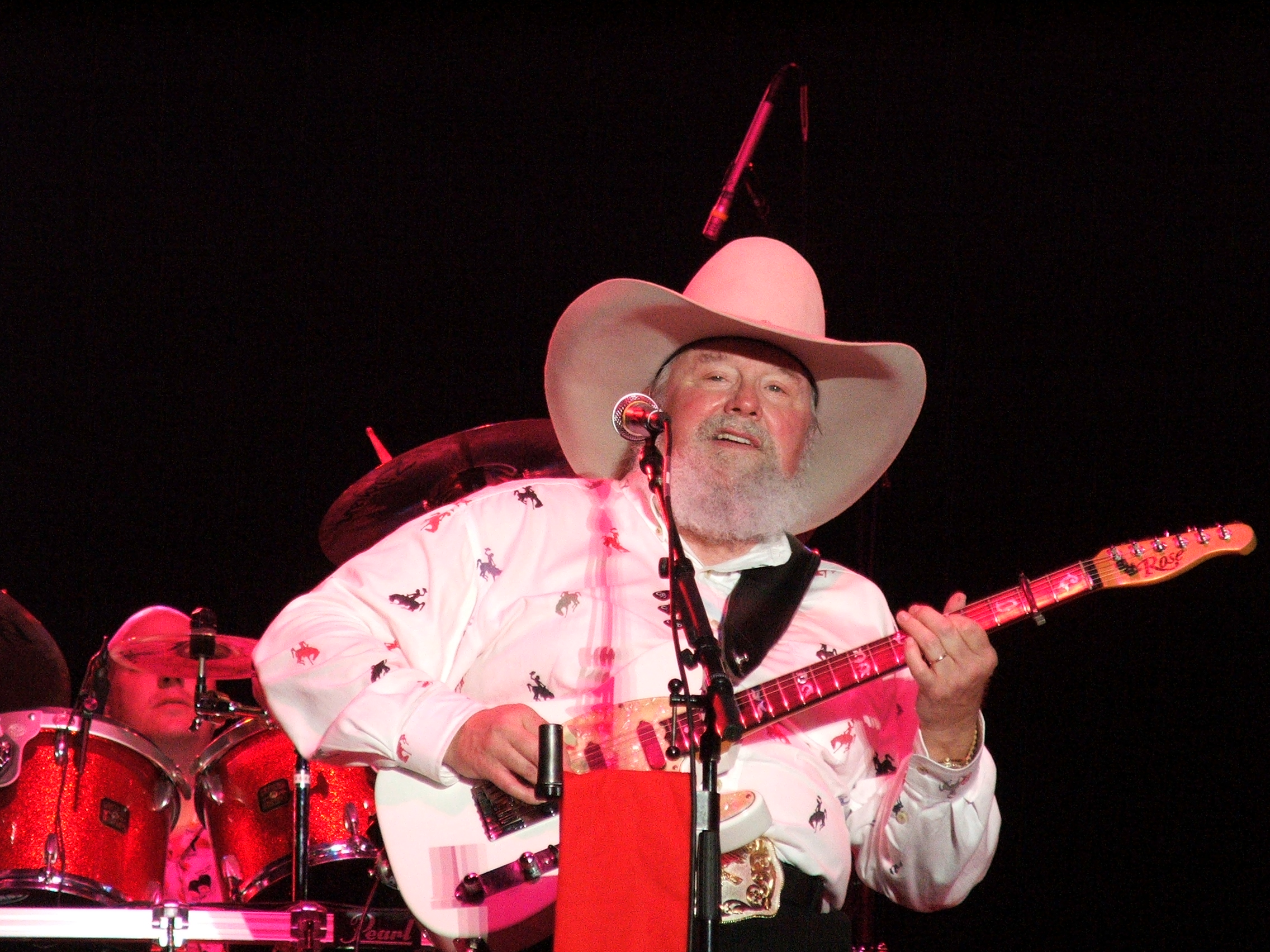
- Charlie Daniels at the Country Fever Festival in Pryor, Oklahoma 2005
- Studio albums: 30
- Live albums: 8
- Compilation albums: 4
- Singles: 54
- Music videos: 21
- #1 singles: 1

This is a detailed discography for American musician Charlie Daniels. Much of his output, including all of his studio albums from 1974 to 1989, is credited to the Charlie Daniels Band.

== Studio albums ==
=== 1970s albums ===
Title	Details	Peak chart positions						Certifications (sales thresholds)
Title	Details	US Cou.	US	AUS	CAN Cou.	CAN	UK	Certifications (sales thresholds)
Charlie Daniels	Release date: 1971; Label: Capitol Records	—	—	—	—	—	—	
Te John, Grease, & Wolfman	Release date: 1972; Label: Kama Sutra Records	—	—	—	—	—	—	
Honey in the Rock (re-released as Uneasy Rider)	Release date: May 1973; Label: Kama Sutra Records	—	164	—	—	—	—	
Way Down Yonder (re-released as Whiskey)	Release date: January 15, 1974; Label: Kama Sutra Records	—	—	—	—	—	—	
Fire on the Mountain	Release date: November 29, 1974; Label: Kama Sutra Records	—	38	71	—	51	—	US: Platinum
Nightrider	Release date: November 25, 1975; Label: Kama Sutra Records	27	57	99	—	—	—	
Saddle Tramp	Release date: March 29, 1976; Label: Epic Records	7	35	—	—	52	—	US: Gold
High Lonesome	Release date: November 5, 1976; Label: Epic Records	17	83	—	—	—	—	
Midnight Wind	Release date: October 7, 1977; Label: Epic Records	42	105	—	—	—	—	US: Gold
Million Mile Reflections	Release date: April 20, 1979; Label: Epic Records	1	5	77	2	9	74	US: 3× Platinum; CAN: Platinum
"—" denotes releases that did not chart

=== 1980s albums ===
Title	Details	Peak chart positions					Certifications (sales thresholds)
Title	Details	US Cou.	US	AUS	CAN Cou.	CAN	Certifications (sales thresholds)
Full Moon	Release date: July 18, 1980; Label: Epic Records	5	11	100	9	40	US: Platinum
Windows	Release date: March 5, 1982; Label: Epic Records	7	26	—	—	—	US: Gold
Me and the Boys	Release date: October 1985; Label: Epic Records	27	—	—	—	—	
Powder Keg	Release date: 1987; Label: Epic Records	—	—	—	—	—	
Homesick Heroes	Release date: August 15, 1988; Label: Epic Records	16	181	—	—	—	
Simple Man	Release date: October 17, 1989; Label: Epic Records	2	82	—	—	—	US: Platinum
"—" denotes releases that did not chart

=== 1990s albums ===
Title	Details	Peak chart positions	
Title	Details	US Cou.	US
Renegade	Release date: April 23, 1991; Label: Epic Records	25	139
America, I Believe in You	Release date: April 12, 1993; Label: Liberty Records	75	—
The Door	Release date: 1994; Label: Sparrow Records	—	—
Same Ol' Me	Release date: 1995; Label: Capitol Records	—	—
Steel Witness	Release date: 1996; Label: Sparrow Records	—	—
Blues Hat	Release date: 1997; Label: Blue Hat Records	—	—
By the Light of the Moon	Release date: 1997; Label: Sony Music	—	—
Tailgate Party	Release date: 1999; Label: Blue Hat Records	—	—
"—" denotes releases that did not chart

=== 2000s albums ===
Title	Details	Peak positions
Title	Details	US Country
Road Dogs	Release date: May 30, 2000; Label: Blue Hat Records	—
How Sweet the Sound: 25 Favorite Hymns and Gospel Greats	Release date: January 29, 2002; Label: Sparrow Records	40
Redneck Fiddlin' Man	Release date: July 23, 2002; Label: Audium Entertainment	40
Songs From the Longleaf Pines	Release date: March 22, 2005; Label: Koch Records	—
Deuces	Release date: October 9, 2007; Label: Koch Records	67
"—" denotes releases that did not chart

=== 2010s albums ===
Title	Details
Off the Grid: Doin' It Dylan	Release date: April 1, 2014; Label: Blue Hat Records
Night Hawk	Release date: August 26, 2016; Label: CDC Records/Bob Frank Distribution/RED

== Compilation and live albums ==
Title	Details	Peak chart positions		Certifications (sales thresholds)
Title	Details	US Country	US	Certifications (sales thresholds)
Volunteer Jam	Release date: 1976; Label: Kama Sutra Records	—	—	
Volunteer Jam III and IV	Release date: 1978; Label: Epic Records	—	—	
Volunteer Jam VI	Release date: 1980; Label: Epic Records	—	104	
Volunteer Jam VII	Release date: 1981; Label: Epic Records	—	—	
A Decade of Hits	Release date: June 20, 1983; Label: Epic Records	25	84	US: 4× Platinum
Super Hits	Release date: May 31, 1994; Label: Epic Records	35	—	US: 2× Platinum
The Roots Remain	Release date: 1996; Label: Epic Records	—	—	
Fiddle Fire: 25 Years of the Charlie Daniels Band	Release date: August 18, 1998; Label: Blue Hat Records	52	—	
Volunteer Jam/Classic Live Performances: Volume One	Release date: April 20, 1999; Label: Blue Hat Records	—	—	
Volunteer Jam/Classic Live Performances: Volume two	Release date: June 1, 1999; Label: Blue Hat Records	—	—	
Live!	Release date: October 9, 2001; Label: Audium Entertainment	38	—	
Freedom and Justice for All	Release date: July 8, 2003; Label: Blue Hat Records	55	—	
Essential Super Hits	Release date: July 27, 2004; Label: Koch Records	66	—	
16 Biggest Hits	Release date: September 5, 2006; Label: Legacy Recordings	12	—	
Live from Iraq	Release date: June 29, 2007; Label: Blue Hat Records	72	—	
Land That I Love	Release date: August 10, 2010; Label: Blue Hat Records	68	—	
Hits of the South	Release date: February 19, 2013; Label: Megaforce Records	—	—	
Country: Charlie Daniels	Release date: 2013; Label: Sony Music	36	—	
Live at Billy Bob's Texas	Release date: October 16, 2015; Label: CDB	—	—	
Memories, Memoirs and Miles – Songs of a Lifetime	Release date: October 24, 2017; Label: CDC Records/Bob Frank Distribution/RED	—	—	US: 2,300
"—" denotes releases that did not chart

== Christmas albums ==
Title	Details
Christmas Time Down South	Release date: 1990; Label: Epic Records
A Merry Christmas to All	Release date: 2002; Label: Audium Entertainment
Joy To The World: A Bluegrass Christmas	Release date: 2009; Label: Koch Records
Hallelujah, It's Christmas Time Again	Release date: 2012; Label: Buffets, Inc.

== Singles ==
=== 1960s and 1970s ===
Year	Single	Peak chart positions						Certifications	Album
Year	Single	US Cou.	US	US A/C	CAN Cou.	CAN	UK	Certifications	Album
1961	"Robot Romp"	—	—	—	—	—	—		—N/a
1966	"Middle of a Heartache"	—	—	—	—	—	—		—N/a
1972	"Great Big Bunches of Love"	—	—	—	—	—	—		Te John, Grease, & Wolfman
1973	"Uneasy Rider"^{[A]}	67	9	37	69	18	—		Honey in the Rock
1974	"Whiskey"	—	—	—	—	—	—		Way Down Yonder
1974	"Way Down Yonder"	—	—	—	—	—	—		Way Down Yonder
1974	"Land of Opportunity"	—	—	—	—	—	—		Way Down Yonder
1975	"The South's Gonna Do It"	—	29	—	—	68	—		Fire on the Mountain
1975	"Long Haired Country Boy"	—	56	—	—	100	—		Fire on the Mountain
1975	"Birmingham Blues"	—	— (Note: "Birmingham Blues" did not enter the Billboard Hot 100, but peaked at #1 on the Bubbling Under Hot 100 Singles chart.)	—	—	—	—		Nightrider
1975	"Texas"	36	91	—	44	—	—		Nightrider
1976	"Wichita Jail"	22	—	—	13	—	—		Saddle Tramp
1976	"Sweet Louisiana"	—	—	—	—	—	—		Saddle Tramp
1976	"Billy the Kid"	75	—	—	—	—	—		High Lonesome
1977	"Good Ole Boy"	—	—	—	—	—	—		Midnight Wind
1977	"Heaven Can Be Anywhere"	85	—	—	—	—	—		Midnight Wind
1978	"Sugar Hill Saturday Night"	—	—	—	—	—	—		Midnight Wind
1978	"Trudy"	—	—	—	—	—	—		Volunteer Jam III and IV
1979	"The Devil Went Down to Georgia"	1	3	30	1	5	14	BPI: Gold; RMNZ: Platinum	Million Mile Reflections
1979	"Mississippi"	19	—	—	3	—	—		Million Mile Reflections
1979	"Behind Your Eyes"	87	—	—	—	—	—		Million Mile Reflections
"—" denotes releases that did not chart

=== 1980s ===
Year	Single	Peak chart positions				Album
Year	Single	US Cou.	US	US Main.	CAN Cou.	Album
1980	"Long Haired Country Boy" (re-release)	27	—	—	16	Fire on the Mountain
1980	"In America"	13	11	—	62	Full Moon
1980	"The Legend of Wooley Swamp"	80	31	—	57	Full Moon
1980	"Carolina (I Remember You)"	44	—	—	20	Full Moon
1981	"Sweet Home Alabama"	94	— (Note: "Sweet Home Alabama" did not enter the Billboard Hot 100, but peaked at #10 on the Bubbling Under Hot 100 Singles chart.)	52	—	Volunteer Jam VII
1982	"Still in Saigon"	—	22	2	—	Windows
1982	"Ragin' Cajun"	76	— (Note: "Ragin' Cajun" did not enter the Billboard Hot 100, but peaked at #9 on the Bubbling Under Hot 100 Singles chart.)	—	—	Windows
1982	"We Had It All One Time"	69	—	—	—	Windows
1983	"Stroker's Theme" (from Stroker Ace)	65	—	—	—	A Decade of Hits
1985	"American Farmer"	54	—	—	—	Me and the Boys
1985	"Still Hurtin' Me"	33	—	—	29	Me and the Boys
1986	"Drinkin' My Baby Goodbye"	8	—	—	21	Me and the Boys
1987	"Bogged Down in Love with You"	—	—	22	—	Powder Keg
1987	"Powder Keg"	—	—	—	—	Powder Keg
1988	"Boogie Woogie Fiddle Country Blues"	10	—	—	10	Homesick Heroes
1988	"Uneasy Rider '88"	—	—	—	—	Homesick Heroes
1989	"Cowboy Hat in Dallas"	36	—	—	—	Homesick Heroes
1989	"Midnight Train"	43	—	—	—	Homesick Heroes
1989	"Simple Man"	12	—	—	15	Simple Man
"—" denotes releases that did not chart

=== 1990s ===
Year	Single	Peak positions		Album
Year	Single	US Cou.	CAN Cou.	Album
1990	"Mister DJ"	34	45	Simple Man
1990	"(What This World Needs Is) A Few More Rednecks"	56	78	Simple Man
1990	"Was It 26"	—	—	Simple Man
1991	"Honky Tonk Life"	65	—	Renegade
1991	"The Twang Factor"	—	—	Renegade
1991	"Little Folks"	47	69	Renegade
1993	"America I Believe in You"	73	—	America I Believe in You
1993	"All Night Long"	—	—	America I Believe in You
1994	"Two Out of Three"	—	—	The Door
1996	"Somebody Was Prayin' for Me"	—	—	Steel Witness
1997	"Long Haired Country Boy" (re-release)	—	—	Blues Hat
1998	"The Devil Went Down to Georgia" (re-release)	60	—	Super Hits
"—" denotes releases that did not chart

=== 2000s and 2010s ===
Year	Single	Peak positions	Album
Year	Single	US Country	Album
2000	"Road Dogs"	—	Road Dogs
2001	"This Ain't No Rag, It's a Flag"	33	Live!
2003	"Southern Boy" (with Travis Tritt)	51	Redneck Fiddlin' Man
2003	"My Beautiful America"	58	Freedom and Justice for All
2004	"The Pledge of Allegiance"	—	Essential Super Hits
2011	"Let 'Em Win or Bring 'Em Home"	—	—N/a
2012	"Take Back the USA"	—	—N/a
"—" denotes releases that did not chart

== Other singles ==
=== Guest singles ===
Year	Single	Artist	Peak chart positions		Certifications (sales thresholds)	Album
Year	Single	Artist	US Cou.	US	Certifications (sales thresholds)	Album
1980	"Willie Jones"	Bobby Bare	19	—		Drunk & Crazy
1993	"The Devil Comes Back to Georgia"	Mark O'Connor (with Johnny Cash, Marty Stuart and Travis Tritt)	54	—		Heroes
2000	"All Night Long" (re-recording)	Montgomery Gentry	31	—		Tattoos & Scars
2010	"Country Boy"	Aaron Lewis (with George Jones)	50	87	US: Platinum	Town Line (EP)
"—" denotes releases that did not chart

== Music videos ==
Year	Title	Director
1983	"Stroker's Theme"	
1987	"Bottom Line" (Live)	
1988	"Boogie Woogie Fiddle Country Blues"	James Arledge
1989	"Midnight Train"	Larry Boothby
1989	"What This World Needs is a Few More Rednecks"	
1989	"Simple Man"	Larry Boothby
1989	"It's My Life" (Live)	
1991	"Honky Tonk Life"	Marc Ball
1991	"Little Folks"	Peter Lippman
1993	"America, I Believe in You"	Peter Lippman
1993	"Can't Beat the Damned Ol' Machine"	Peter Lippman
1993	"The Devil Comes Back to Georgia" (w/ Mark O'Connor, Travis Tritt, Marty Stuart & Johnny Cash)	Gustavo Garzon
1994	"Two Out of Three"	Tom Bevins
1995	"Same Ol' Me"	
1996	"Somebody Was Prayin' for Me"	Stan Strickland
1997	"Long Haired Country Boy" (w/ John Berry & Hal Ketchum)	Ken Carpenter
1998	"Texas" (w/ Ray Benson & Lee Roy Parnell)	Peter Zavadil
1999	"The Devil Went Down to Georgia" (Live)	Corlew & Grimes
1999	"How Big 'a Boy Are Ya?" (w/ Roy D. Mercer)	Peter Zavadil
2000	"Road Dogs"	Chip Dumstorf
2000	"All Night Long" (w/ Montgomery Gentry)	Tom Forrest
2001	"In America" (Live)	
2002	"The Last Fallen Hero"	
2002	"Southern Boy" (w/ Travis Tritt)	Peter Zavadil
2010	"Country Boy" (w/ Aaron Lewis, George Jones & Chris Young)	Alex Castino
2011	"Red Skelton's Pledge of Allegiance"	
2014	"Tangled Up in Blue"	David Corlew/Nathan Shuppert
2015	"My Beautiful America"	
2017	"Can't Beat the Damned Ole Machine"	Lyric Video
2017	"Ragged Old Flag" (feat. Mark "Oz" Geist)	David Corlew/Nathan Shuppert

== Appearances as sideman ==
- with Leonard Cohen:
  - Songs of Love and Hate
  - Live Songs
- with Bob Dylan:
  - Nashville Skyline
  - New Morning
  - Self Portrait
- with Marshall Tucker Band:
  - A New Life
  - Where We All Belong
- with Ringo Starr:
  - Beaucoups of Blues

== Notes ==
- A "Uneasy Rider" also peaked at number 30 on the RPM Adult Contemporary Tracks chart in Canada.
