= Essential Super Hits =

Compilation album by Charlie Daniels
- Released: July 27, 2004
- Label: Koch/Blue Hat

Charlie Daniels chronology
Freedom and Justice For All (2003)	Essential Super Hits (2004)	Songs From the Longleaf Pines (2005)

Professional ratings
Review scores
Source	Rating
Allmusic	3/5 stars

Essential Super Hits is a compilation album by American musician Charlie Daniels. Released on July 27, 2004, the compilation consists of a compact disc of Daniels' hits, and a 5-song DVD video.

The CD is somewhat known for having rerecorded versions of "The Devil Went Down To Georgia", "Still In Saigon", "The South's Gonna Do It", and "Uneasy Rider", and "Long Haired Country Boy." In "The Devil Went Down To Georgia", the line featuring "son of a bitch" is sung as "son of a gun" and in "Uneasy Rider" many of the pop culture references have been updated. In "Long Haired Country Boy" the references to drugs (including alcohol) have been replaced.

== Track listing ==
=== CD ===
1. "The South's Gonna Do It"
2. "The Devil Went Down to Georgia"
3. "Long Haired Country Boy"
4. "Still in Saigon"
5. "Texas"
6. "Drinkin' My Baby Goodbye"
7. "In America"
8. "Simple Man"
9. "This Ain't No Rag, It's a Flag"
10. "Southern Boy (feat. Travis Tritt)"
11. "The Legend of Wooley Swamp"
12. "Free Bird"
13. "Boogie Woogie Fiddle Country Blues"
14. "Uneasy Rider"
15. "Trudy"
16. "The Intimidator"
17. "The Pledge of Allegiance"

Track 17 is unlisted. It is a spoken track where Charlie Daniels recites the Red Skelton monologue about the pledge from 1969.

=== DVD ===
1. "Texas"
2. "Long Haired Country Boy"
3. "In America"
4. "Last Fallen Hero"
5. "Southern Boy"

== Chart performance ==
Chart (2004)	Peak position
U.S. Billboard Top Country Albums	66
