= 16 Biggest Hits (Charlie Daniels album) =

Greatest hits album by Charlie Daniels
- Released: September 5, 2006
- Length: 66:01
- Label: Legacy

Charlie Daniels chronology
Songs from the Longleaf Pines (2005)	16 Biggest Hits (2006)	Live from Iraq (2007)

Professional ratings
Review scores
Source	Rating
AllMusic	4.5/5 stars

16 Biggest Hits is a 2006 Charlie Daniels compilation album. It is part of a series of similar 16 Biggest Hits albums released by Legacy Recordings.

== Track listing ==
No.	Title	Writer(s)	Length
1.	"Uneasy Rider"	Charlie Daniels	5:20
2.	"The South's Gonna Do It"	Daniels	3:59
3.	"Trudy"	Daniels	4:51
4.	"Long Haired Country Boy"	Daniels	4:03
5.	"Midnight Wind"	Daniels, Tom Crain, Taz DiGregorio, Fred Edwards, Charles Hayward, James W. Marshall	3:19
6.	"The Devil Went Down to Georgia"	Daniels, Crain, DiGregorio, Edwards, Hayward, Marshall	3:36
7.	"Reflections"	Daniels, Crain, DiGregorio, Edwards, Hayward, Marshall	5:26
8.	"The Legend of Wooley Swamp"	Daniels, Crain, DiGregorio, Edwards, Hayward, Marshall	4:17
9.	"Carolina (I Remember You)"	Daniels, Crain, DiGregorio, Edwards, Hayward, Don Murray	5:12
10.	"In America"	Daniels, Crain, DiGregorio, Edwards, Hayward, Marshall	3:20
11.	"Still in Saigon"	Dan Daley	3:53
12.	"Drinkin' My Baby Goodbye"	Daniels	3:41
13.	"Cowboy Hat in Dallas"	Daniels, Crain, DiGregorio, Hayward, Jack Gavin	4:30
14.	"Boogie Woogie Fiddle Country Blues"	Daniels, Crain, DiGregorio, Hayward, Gavin	3:27
15.	"Simple Man"	Daniels, DiGregorio, Hayward, Gavin	3:25
16.	"(What This World Needs Is) A Few More Rednecks"	Daniels, DiGregorio, Hayward, Gavin	3:42

== Chart performance ==
16 Biggest Hits first reached #68 on the U.S. Billboard Top Country Albums chart in 2007. It later peaked at #12 following Daniels' passing.

Chart (2006–2007)	Peak position
U.S. Billboard Top Country Albums	68
Chart (2020)	Peak position
U.S. Billboard Top Country Albums	12
