= Live from Iraq =

Live album by The Charlie Daniels Band
- Released: June 29, 2007
- Recorded: 2006
- Venue: Iraq
- Length: 65:01
- Label: Blue Hat/Koch
- Producers: Charlie Daniels and Chris Wormer

The Charlie Daniels Band chronology
16 Biggest Hits (2006)	Live from Iraq (2007)	Deuces (2007)

Live from Iraq is a live album by The Charlie Daniels Band released in 2007. It was recorded during a 2006 USO tour of Iraq in front of U.S. troops. The CD is accompanied by a DVD featuring a 45-minute documentary of the band's trip to Iraq.

== Track listing ==
1. "Notte Pericolosa" (Charlie Daniels, Chris Wormer) - 0:32
2. "In America" (Daniels, Tommy Crain, Taz DiGregorio, Fred Edwards, Charlie Hayward, Jim Marshall) - 3:17
3. "The South's Gonna Do It" (Daniels) - 3:38
4. "The Legend of Wooley Swamp" (Daniels, Crain, DiGregorio, Edwards, Hayward, Marshall) - 5:28
5. "Saddle Tramp" (Daniels, Crain, DiGregorio, Edwards, Hayward, Don Murray) - 10:36
6. "Simple Man" (Daniels, DiGregorio, John L. Gavin, Hayward) - 3:29
7. "Iraq Blues" (Daniels) - 2:16
8. "Floreeda Road" (Daniels) - 9:40
9. "Long Haired Country Boy" (Daniels) - 4:42
10. "Uneasy Rider" (Daniels) - 5:29
11. "How Great Thou Art" (Stuart K. Hine) - 4:18
12. "Drinkin' My Baby Goodbye" (Daniels) - 3:40
13. "Rocky Top" (Boudleaux & Felice Bryant)- 3:19
14. "The Devil Went Down to Georgia" (Daniels, Crain, DiGregorio, Edwards, Hayward, Marshall) - 4:39

== Personnel ==
The Charlie Daniels Band:

- Charlie Daniels - Fiddle, guitar, vocals
- Joel "Taz" DiGregorio - Piano, B-3 organ, keyboards, vocals
- Charlie Hayward - Electric bass
- Bruce Brown - Electric guitar, acoustic guitar, vocals
- Pat McDonald - drums, percussion
- Chris Wormer - Additional guitars

== Production ==
- Executive Producer: David Corlew
- Produced by: Charlie Daniels & Chris Wormer
- Engineered and mixed by: Chris Wormer & Bob Workman
- Mixed at Wormaster Studio
- Mastered by: Jim DeMain at Yes Master, Nashville, TN
- Live recording assistance: CDB International Road Crew - Jimmy Burton, Roger Campbell, Bob Edwards & Bob Workman
- Production coordinators: Bebe Evans, Paula Szeigis & Angela Gresham-Wheeler
- Art direction: Angela Gresham-Wheeler, Paula Szeigis & Erick Anderson
- Cover photo: Randy Harris
- Additional photography: Randy Harris, David Corlew & Bebe Evans
- Design: Erick Anderson

== DVD Production ==
- Produced & directed by: David Corlew
- Written by: David Corlew & Jessica Berryman
- Edited by: Jessica Berryman
- Associate producers: Bebe Evans & Angela Gresham-Wheeler
- Videographer: David Corlew
- Secondary videographers: Tony Reyes & Jacob Smithson
- Remote location manager, grip & best boy: Bebe Evans
- Original musical score by: Chris Wormer
- Post production supervisor: Read Ridley

== Catalog number ==
- CD Catalog Number: Koch Records KOC-CD-4246

== Chart performance ==
Chart (2007)	Peak position
US Top Country Albums (Billboard)	72
