= Super Hits (Charlie Daniels album) =

Greatest hits album by The Charlie Daniels Band
- Released: May 31, 1994
- Length: 39:06
- Label: Epic
- Producer: John Boylan

The Charlie Daniels Band chronology
The Door (1994)	Super Hits (1994)	Same Ol' Me (1995)

Super Hits is a compilation album by The Charlie Daniels Band released on May 31, 1994. It was re-released in 2007. Super Hits was certified 2× Platinum by the RIAA for sales of 2 million copies.

== Track listing ==
No.	Title	Writer(s)	Length
1.	"Uneasy Rider"	Charlie Daniels	5:20
2.	"Long Haired Country Boy"	Daniels	4:03
3.	"The South's Gonna Do It"	Daniels	3:59
4.	"The Devil Went Down to Georgia"	Daniels, Tom Crain, Taz DiGregorio, Fred Edwards, Charles Hayward, James W. Marshall	3:35
5.	"In America"	Daniels, Crain, DiGregorio, Edwards, Hayward, Marshall	3:18
6.	"Still in Saigon"	Dan Daley	3:52
7.	"Drinkin' My Baby Goodbye"	Daniels	3:40
8.	"Uneasy Rider '88"	Daniels, Crain, DiGregorio, Hayward, Jack Gavin	4:26
9.	"Boogie Woogie Fiddle Country Blues"	Daniels, Crain, DiGregorio, Hayward, Gavin	3:26
10.	"Simple Man"	Daniels, DiGregorio, Hayward, Gavin	3:22

== Critical reception ==
Professional ratings
Review scores
Source	Rating
Allmusic	4.5/5 stars

Stephen Thomas Erlewine of Allmusic concludes that the album is "entertaining" but "leaves you wanting more."

== Charts ==
=== Weekly charts ===
Chart (1994–1996)	Peak position
US Top Country Albums (Billboard)	35

=== Year-end charts ===
Chart (1996)	Position
US Top Country Albums (Billboard)	66

== Certifications ==
Region	Certification	Certified units/sales
United States (RIAA)	2× Platinum	2,000,000^{^}
^{^} Shipments figures based on certification alone.
