= Live! (The Charlie Daniels Band album) =

Live album by The Charlie Daniels Band
- Released: October 9, 2001
- Recorded: 2000–2001
- Label: Audium
- Producer: Patrick Kelly

The Charlie Daniels Band chronology
Road Dogs (2000)	Live! (2001)	How Sweet the Sound: 25 Favorite Hymns and Gospel Greats (2002)

Professional ratings
Review scores
Source	Rating
Allmusic	4.5/5 stars

Live! is a live album by The Charlie Daniels Band released on October 9, 2001. All of the tracks except for the last track, "This Ain't No Rag, It's a Flag" are live recordings.

== Track listing ==
1. "Introduction" - 0:22
2. "Road Dogs" - 3:53
3. "Caballo Diablo" - 4:45
4. "The Legend of Wooley Swamp" - 4:41
5. "Simple Man" - 3:18
6. "Sidewinder" - 7:37
7. "Trudy" - 4:54
8. "Still in Saigon" - 4:48
9. "In America" - 3:25
10. "Take the Highway" - 4:47
11. "Elizabeth Reed" - 5:14
12. "Free Bird" - 7:07
13. "The South's Gonna Do It" - 4:41
14. "Long Haired Country Boy" - 4:07
15. "Drinkin' My Baby Goodbye" - 4:01
16. "The Devil Went Down to Georgia" - 5:22
17. "This Ain't No Rag, It's a Flag" [Bonus Track] - 3:28

== Chart performance ==
=== Album ===
Chart (2001)	Peak position
U.S. Top Country Albums	38
U.S. Top Independent Albums	13

=== Singles ===
Year	Single	Chart Positions
Year	Single	US Country
2001	"This Ain't No Rag, It's A Flag"	33

== Personnel ==
The Charlie Daniels Band:

- Charlie Daniels - Guitar, fiddle, vocals
- Bruce Ray Brown - Guitar, vocals
- Chris Wormer - Guitar, vocals
- Mark Matejka - Guitar, vocals
- Joel "Taz" DiGregorio - keyboards, vocals
- Julian King - trumpet
- Pat McDonald - drums, percussion
- Charles Hayward - Bass
