= A Decade of Hits (Charlie Daniels album) =

Compilation album by The Charlie Daniels Band
- Released: June 20, 1983
- Genre: Country; rock
- Length: 37:20
- Label: Epic/Legacy
- Producer: Al Quagieri

The Charlie Daniels Band chronology
| Windows (1982) | A Decade of Hits (1983) | Me and the Boys (1985) |

Professional ratings
Review scores
| Source | Rating |
|---|---|
| Allmusic | 4.5/5 stars |

A Decade of Hits is a compilation album by The Charlie Daniels Band released on June 20, 1983. There were three new songs for the album, "Stroker's Theme (Theme from the movie, "Stroker Ace"), which was released as a single, "Let It Roll" and "Everytime I See Him".

== Track listing ==
| No. | Title | Writer(s) | Length |
|---|---|---|---|
| 1. | "The Devil Went Down to Georgia" | Charlie Daniels; Tom Crain; Joel "Taz" DiGregorio; Fred Edwards; Charlie Hayward; Jim Marshall | 3:34 |
| 2. | "The South's Gonna Do It" | Daniels | 3:57 |
| 3. | "Stroker's Theme" | Daniels | 2:50 |
| 4. | "Uneasy Rider" | Daniels | 5:18 |
| 5. | "Let It Roll" | Paul Kennerley | 2:56 |
| 6. | "In America" | Daniels; Crain; DiGregorio; Edwards; Hayward; Marshall | 3:18 |
| 7. | "Still in Saigon" | Dan Daley | 3:51 |
| 8. | "Long Haired Country Boy" | Daniels | 4:02 |
| 9. | "The Legend of Wooley Swamp" | Daniels; Crain; DiGregorio; Edwards; Hayward; Marshall | 4:13 |
| 10. | "Everytime I See Him" | Daniels; Crain; DiGregorio; Edwards; Hayward | 3:21 |

== Personnel ==
- Charlie Daniels – guitar, violin, vocals, producer
- Tom Crain – guitar, vocals
- "Taz" DiGregorio – keyboards, vocals
- Fred Edwards – drums
- Charlie Hayward – bass
- Chris Athens – mastering
- John Boylan – producer
- Larry Dixon – photography
- Bill Flannery – photography
- Paul Grupp – engineer

== Chart performance ==
=== Weekly charts ===
| Chart (1983) | Peak position |
|---|---|
| US Billboard 200 | 84 |
| US Top Country Albums (Billboard) | 25 |

=== Year-end charts ===
| Chart (1990) | Position |
|---|---|
| US Top Country Albums (Billboard) | 57 |

=== Singles ===
| Year | Single | Chart Positions |
| Year | Single | US Country |
|---|---|---|
| 1983 | "Stroker's Theme" | 65 |

== Certifications ==
| Region | Certification | Certified units/sales |
|---|---|---|
| United States (RIAA) | 4× Platinum | 4,000,000^{^} |
^{^} Shipments figures based on certification alone.
