= Land That I Love =

Compilation album by Charlie Daniels
- Released: August 10, 2010
- Recorded: Twin Pines Studios, Lebanon, Tennessee
- Length: 57:31
- Label: Blue Hat/E1
- Producer: Charlie Daniels and Patrick Kelley

Charlie Daniels chronology
Joy To The World: A Bluegrass Christmas (2009)	Land That I Love (2010)	Hallelujah It's Christmas Time Again (2012)

Land That I Love is a compilation album by American musician Charlie Daniels. Released on August 8, 2010, the album consists of Daniels' previously recorded patriotic work, as well as two new songs, "Iraq Blues" and "(What This World Needs is) A Few More Rednecks 2010". Charlie Daniels felt that "it was the perfect time for a compilation of patriotic music". Charlie Daniels said in an interview that the album is called Land That I Love because the United States of America is the land that he loves.

== Track listing ==
No.	Title	Writer(s)	Length
1.	"My Beautiful America"	Charlie Daniels	3:53
2.	"America, I Believe in You"	Daniels, Taz DiGregorio, Charlie Hayward, Jack Gavin	4:34
3.	"American Farmer"	Daniels, Tom Crain, DiGregorio, Fred Edwards, Hayward	3:47
4.	"Let Freedom Ring"	Daniels, DiGregorio, Howard, Gavin, Bruce Ray Brown	5:10
5.	"(What This World Needs is) A Few More Rednecks (2010 version)"	Daniels, DiGregorio, Hayward, Gavin	3:40
6.	"This Ain't No Rag, It's a Flag"	Daniels	3:35
7.	"Still in Saigon"	Dan Daley	4:00
8.	"The Last Fallen Hero"	Daniels	4:04
9.	"In America"	Daniels, Crain, DiGregorio, Edwards, Hayward, James W. Marshall	3:23
10.	"The Star-Spangled Banner"	Francis Scott Key, John Stafford Smith	1:50
11.	"Freedom and Justice for All"	Daniels	4:28
12.	"Iraq Blues"	Daniels	4:18
13.	"Simple Man"	Daniels, DiGregorio, Hayward, Gavin	3:37
14.	"Red Skelton's Pledge of Allegiance (Recitation)"	Red Skelton	2:42
15.	"Summer of '68"	Daniels	4:30

== New Songs ==
(What This World Needs is) A Few More Rednecks

The "Redneck" term has negative perceptions in the culture of people down South. They think that a redneck is a person that drives around in their truck, throwing bottles out the window, looking for people to beat up. To Daniels, "that's not a redneck, that's an idiot." Daniels considers rednecks to be the mass of hardworking people who make America work and bring common sense and efficiency to their everyday lives.“I’ve always liked this song,” Daniels said, “I like the people it represents. These are my kind of people, the people I hang out with.” He did a new version of "(What This World Needs is) A Few More Rednecks" partially because "there was a line in the song about Gorbachev, and he doesn't really come up anymore".

Iraq Blues

The other new song, “Iraq Blues,” was written and recorded mainly for the people of America's military. Daniels was "trying to communicate with them". He stated that "they are great Americans and great patriots. They have a real sense of mission and are doing an important job in a hard and desolate place. But they don't complain and every day they take their lives in their own hands. I wanted them to know that we appreciate that."

== Critical reception ==
Professional ratings
Review scores
Source	Rating
Allmusic	2.5/5 stars

Land That I Love received two and a half stars out of five from Stephen Thomas Erlewine of Allmusic. Erlewine concludes that the album "may not be a great enticement for the fan who already owns everything featured here, but it surely adds a bit of modern patriotic fervor to a collection designed for the reddest of the red states. The remakes aren't as good as the originals-- and the recitations are quite heavy-handed--but the Land That I Love delivers what it promises, no more and no less."

== Chart performance ==
Land That I Love peaked at number 68 on the U.S. Billboard Top Country Albums chart.

Chart (2010)	Peak position
U.S. Billboard Top Country Albums	68
