= Freedom and Justice for All =

Compilation album by Charlie Daniels
- Released: July 8, 2003
- Recorded: Twin Pines Studio Lebanon, Tennessee
- Length: 54:16
- Label: Blue Hat
- Producers: Charlie Daniels; Patrick Kelly

Charlie Daniels chronology
A Merry Christmas to All (2002)	Freedom and Justice for All (2003)	Essential Super Hits (2004)

Freedom and Justice for All is a compilation album by American musician Charlie Daniels. Released on July 8, 2003, the compilation consists of Daniels' patriotic songs.

== Track listing ==
No.	Title	Writer(s)	Length
1.	"My Beautiful America (Recitation)"	Daniels	3:51
2.	"In America"	Crain, Daniels, DiGregorio, Edwards, Hayward, Marshall	3:19
3.	"Summer of '68"	Daniels	4:31
4.	"Let Freedom Ring"	Brown, Daniels, DiGregorio, Gavin, Hayward	5:09
5.	"The Last Fallen Hero"	Daniels	4:03
6.	"Freedom and Justice for All"	Charlie Daniels	4:26
7.	"American Farmer"	Crain, Daniels, DiGregorio, Edwards, Hayward	3:44
8.	"God Bless the Mother"	Daniels	4:00
9.	"Simple Man"	Daniels, DiGregorio, Gavin, Hayward	3:36
10.	"Still in Saigon"	Daley	3:57
11.	"This Ain't No Rag, It's a Flag"	Daniels	3:32
12.	"(What This World Needs Is) A Few More Rednecks"	Daniels, DiGregorio, Gavin, Hayward	3:46
13.	"America, I Believe in You"	Brown, Daniels, DiGregorio, Gavin, Hayward	4:33
14.	"Star Spangled Banner (Instrumental)"	Key, Public Domain, Smith	1:49

== Chart performance ==
Freedom and Justice For All peaked at number 55 on the U.S. Billboard Top Country Albums chart.

Chart (2003)	Peak position
U.S. Billboard Top Country Albums	55
