= Fiddle Fire: 25 Years of the Charlie Daniels Band =

Compilation album by Charlie Daniels
- Released: August 18, 1998
- Length: 48:49
- Label: Blue Hat
- Producer: Ron W. Griffin

Charlie Daniels chronology
By the Light of the Moon (1997)	Fiddle Fire: 25 Years of the Charlie Daniels Band (1998)	Tailgate Party (1999)

Professional ratings
Review scores
Source	Rating
Allmusic	4/5 stars

Fiddle Fire: 25 Years of the Charlie Daniels Band is a compilation album by American musician Charlie Daniels. Released on August 18, 1998, the album consists of re-recordings of a number of his hits. The compilation was reissued on July 12, 2005.

== Track listing ==
1. "Texas"
2. "The Devil Went Down to Georgia"
3. "High Lonesome"
4. "Fais Do Do"
5. "Boogie Woogie Fiddle Country Blues"
6. "The South's Gonna Do It"
7. "Drinkin' My Baby Goodbye"
8. "Fiddle Fire"
9. "The Fiddle Player's Got the Blues"
10. "Layla"
11. "Orange Blossom Special"
12. "Talk to Me Fiddle"

== Chart performance ==
Chart (1998)	Peak position
U.S. Billboard Top Country Albums	52

== Reception ==
The album received four out of five stars from Michael B. Smith of Allmusic. He concludes that "Charlie Daniels displays his exceptional fiddle playing in this compilation of his best fiddle songs. There isn't a bad track on the disc. An excellent collection of Tennessee mountain-inspired fiddle-sawing."
