= Deuces (album) =

Studio album by Charlie Daniels
- Released: October 9, 2007
- Length: 54:58
- Label: Koch
- Producer: Charlie Daniels; David Corlew

Charlie Daniels chronology
Live from Iraq (2007)	Deuces (2007)	Joy To The World: A Bluegrass Christmas (2009)

Deuces is an album by the Charlie Daniels Band. Released on October 9, 2007, it consists of duets with prominent rock, country and bluegrass artists, including covers of songs by Ray Charles and Bob Dylan. Guests on the album include Dolly Parton, Darius Rucker, Brenda Lee, Vince Gill, the Del McCoury Band, Brad Paisley, Brooks & Dunn and Gretchen Wilson. An expanded edition, entitled Duets was released on July 16, 2021, which includes 6 additional tracks, including a duet with Garth Brooks.

== Critical reception ==
Professional ratings
Review scores
Source	Rating
Allmusic	3/5 stars

Deuces received three stars out of five on Allmusic. In its review by Stephen Thomas Erlewine, he concludes that "Deuces is a clever title for a collection of duets between Charlie Daniels and a bunch of other country stars, ranging from Gretchen Wilson to Vince Gill, Dolly Parton to Brad Paisley. Although the song selection may be a little bit too predictable, Deuces isn't about the songs, it's about the performances, and there's a bunch of great ones here, with the CDB always sounding in top form, sometimes really catching fire with their guests, as when they dig into "Evangeline" with the Del McCoury Band, trade riffs with Paisley on "Jammin' for Stevie," and lay into "God Save Us All from Religion" with Marty Stuart."

== Track listing ==
1. "What'd I Say" (with Travis Tritt)
2. "Signed, Sealed, Delivered" (with Bonnie Bramlett)
3. "Jackson" (with Gretchen Wilson)
4. "The Night They Drove Old Dixie Down" (with Vince Gill)
5. "Maggie's Farm" (with Earl Scruggs, Gary Scruggs, and Randy Scruggs)
6. "Daddy's Old Fiddle" (with Dolly Parton)
7. "Like A Rolling Stone" (with Darius Rucker)
8. "Evangeline" (with Del McCoury Band)
9. "Let It Be Me" (with Brenda Lee)
10. "Long Haired Country Boy" (with Brooks & Dunn)
11. "God Save Us All From Religion" (with Marty Stuart)
12. "Drinkin' My Baby Goodbye" (with Montgomery Gentry)
13. "Jammin for Stevie" (with Brad Paisley)

== Personnel ==
- Charlie Daniels - Fiddle, guitar, vocals
- Joel "Taz" DiGregorio - Keyboards, Hammond organ, piano, vocals
- Charlie Hayward - Electric bass
- Chris Wormer - Guitar, acoustic guitar, electric guitar, vocals
- Bruce Ray Brown - Acoustic guitar, electric guitar, vocals
- Pat McDonald - Drums, percussion
- Alan Bartram - bass
- Jason Carter - Fiddle
- Carolyn Corlew - Background vocals
- Kevin Haynie - Banjo
- Chris Layton - Drums
- Del McCoury - Guitar
- Rob McCoury - Banjo
- Ronnie McCoury - Mandolin
- Tommy Shannon - Bass
- Bonnie Bramlett - Background vocals, guest appearance
- Vince Gill - Guest appearance
- Brenda Lee - Guest appearance
- Montgomery Gentry - Guest appearance
- Brad Paisley - Composer, guitar, guest appearance
- Dolly Parton - Composer, guest appearance
- Darius Rucker - Guest appearance
- Earl Scruggs - Banjo, background vocals, guest appearance
- Gary Scruggs - Guitar, vocals, guest appearance
- Randy Scruggs - Guitar, background vocals, guest appearance
- Marty Stuart - Guest appearance
- Travis Tritt - Guest appearance
- Gretchen Wilson - Guest appearance

== Chart performance ==
Chart (2007)	Peak position
U.S. Billboard Top Country Albums	67
