= Powder Keg =

Powder Keg or Powderkeg may refer to:

- Powder keg, a keg of gunpowder, or, metaphorically, a politically unstable geographic region

== Film and television ==
- Powder Keg (1998 film) or Cabaret Balkan, a Serbian film
- Powder Keg (2001 film), a short film directed by Alejandro González Iñárritu, in the BMW branded series The Hire
- "The Powder Keg", a chapter of the 1950 film serial Desperadoes of the West
- "Powder Keg" (Murder, She Wrote), a 1986 television episode
- "Powderkeg" (Bearcats!), a 1971 television episode
- "Powder Keg", a 1957 episode of Hawkeye and the Last of the Mohicans

== Music ==
- Powder Keg, an album by Charlie Daniels, 1987
- Powderkeg, an album by the Glasspack, 2002
- "Powder Keg", an instrumental by Wayne Shorter from Wayning Moments, 1961
- "Powder Keg", a song by the Fall from The Light User Syndrome, 1996
- "Powderkeg", a song by 7th Order, 2011

== Other uses ==
- Powder Keg: A Blast into the Wilderness, a roller coaster at Silver Dollar City in Branson, Missouri, US
- Powderkeg (character), a Marvel Comics supervillain
- Powder Keg Festival, a festival in Buffalo, New York, US
- The Powder Keg, a sports rivalry between Tilton School and New Hampton School in New Hampshire, US

== See also ==
- Powder keg of Europe, a term applied to the Balkans in the early 20th century
- Krudttønden (lit. "The Powder Keg"), a café and cultural centre in Copenhagen, Denmark
