= Captain Kidd (disambiguation) =

Captain Kidd (1645–1701) was a Scottish sailor who was tried and executed for piracy.

Captain Kidd may also refer to:

- Captain Kidd (film), a 1945 film starring Charles Laughton
- "Captain Kidd" (song), an English song about Captain Kidd
- Captain Kidd, Jr., a 1919 American silent film
- Captain Kidd's Kids, a 1919 American short comedy film featuring Harold Lloyd
- 'Captain Kidd' apple, a red mutation of the 'Kidd's Orange Red' apple
- Captain Kidd (pub), a pub in Wapping named after the Scottish sailor
- Captain Jefferson Kidd, fictional character in News of the World

== See also ==
- William Kidd (disambiguation)
