= Billy the Kid (disambiguation) =

Billy the Kid (William H. Bonney, 1859–1881) was a notorious Western outlaw.

Billy the Kid may also refer to:

== Films and television ==
- Billy the Kid (1911 film), an American film directed by Laurence Trimble
- Billy the Kid (1930 film), a Hollywood film
- Billy the Kid (film series), a 1940s series of Western films
- Billy the Kid (1941 film), a color remake of the 1930 film
- Billy the Kid (1964 film), a Spanish movie by León Klimovsky
- Billy the Kid (1989 film), a made-for-television movie starring Val Kilmer
- Billy the Kid (2013 film), a low-budget movie starring Cody McCarver
- Billy the Kid (TV series), a 2022 TV series created by Michael Hirst

== Literature ==
- Billy the Kid (Charlton Comics), a 1955 comic book series published from the 1950s to the 1980s
- Billy the Kid (Lucky Luke), a 1962 Lucky Luke comic book
- Billy the Kid (novel), a 2000 children's novel by Michael Morpurgo
- Dolly Parton's Billy the Kid, a children's book series by singer-songwriter Dolly Parton, based on her dog of the same name, published from 2023 to 2025.

== Music ==
- Billy the Kid (ballet), a 1938 ballet by Aaron Copland
- "Billy the Kid" (song), a song by Billy Dean
- "Billy the Kid", a 1976 single by Charlie Daniels
- "Billy the Kid", a 2011 song by Dia Frampton from Red
- "Billy the Kid", a 2006 song by Billy Gilman from Billy Gilman
- "Billy the Kid", a song by Tom Petty and the Heartbreakers from Echo
- "Billy the Kid", a song by Marty Robbins from Gunfighter Ballads and Trail Songs

== People ==
- Billy Claiborne (1860–1882), American outlaw and gunfighter, a survivor of the Gunfight at the O.K. Corral
- John Miller (outlaw)
- Billy "The Kid" Emerson (1925–2023), American musician
- Billy Ripken (born 1964), American former MLB player
- Antonio González Pacheco (1946–2020), Spanish police inspector accused of torture during the Franco era
- Billy Wagner (born 1971), American baseball pitcher
- Billy Pettinger (born 1982), Canadian singer performing as Billy the Kid

== See also ==
- "The Ballad of Billy the Kid", song by Billy Joel
- Billy & the Kids, a rock band led by Grateful Dead drummer Bill Kreutzmann
- "Billy and the Kid", an episode of NCIS: New Orleans season 2
- William Kidd (disambiguation), including Bill Kidd and Billy Kidd
- William the Kid (disambiguation)
