= Lucius Clay =

Lucius Clay may refer to:

- Lucius D. Clay (1897–1978), American military governor of Germany after World War II
- Lucius D. Clay, Jr. (1919–1994), American commander of the Air Defense Command
- Lucius Clay is also the protagonist in the song "The Legend of Wooley Swamp" by country musician Charlie Daniels
