= Me and the Boys =

Me and the Boys may refer to:

- Me and the Boys (TV series), an American sitcom that aired on the ABC network
- Me and the Boys (album), a 1985 album by The Charlie Daniels Band
- Me and the Boys (meme), an internet meme

== See also ==
- "The Boys and Me", a song recorded by Sawyer Brown
