= The Door (Charlie Daniels album) =

Studio album by Charlie Daniels
- Released: March 14, 1994
- Studios: Twin Pines Studio, Twin Pines, TN; Quad Studios, Nashville, TN; Sound Stage Studio, Nashville, TN
- Length: 54:39
- Label: Sparrow
- Producer: Ron W. Griffin

Charlie Daniels chronology
America, I Believe in You (1993)	The Door (1994)	Same Ol' Me (1995)

Professional ratings
Review scores
Source	Rating
AllMusic	2/5 stars

The Door is the 19th studio album by American musician Charlie Daniels. Released on March 14, 1994 by Sparrow Records, the album was the first of three Christian albums Daniels recorded for the label. It reached No. 26 on Billboard's Christian albums chart on May 13, 1994, spending twelve weeks on that chart.

== Critical reception ==
AllMusic called the album "less vengeful and apocalyptic than Steel Witness", Daniels' second Christian album for Sparrow.

== Track listing ==
All tracks are written by Charlie Daniels, Bruce Brown, Joel "Taz" DiGregorio, Jack Gavin and Charlie Hayward, unless otherwise noted.

No.	Title	Writer(s)	Length
1.	"The Business of Love"	Steven Curtis Chapman; Charlie Daniels	3:54
2.	"Washed in the Blood"		4:42
3.	"Jesus Died for You"		4:11
4.	"Sunday Morning"	Charlie Daniels	3:02
5.	"Protected by Prayer"		6:18
6.	"Lay It on the Line"		5:26
7.	"Praying to the Wrong God"		4:47
8.	"Two out of Three"	Joel Hemphill; Frank O'Brien	3:59
9.	"End of the World"		4:14
10.	"Jerusalem Trilogy: My Chosen One"		2:26
11.	"Jerusalem Trilogy: The Birth"		4:15
12.	"Jerusalem Trilogy: Crucify Him"		1:56
13.	"Jerusalem Trilogy: Jerusalem's Shame"		2:20
14.	"Jerusalem Trilogy: Joy in the Morning"		3:09
Total length:			54:39

== Musicians ==
- Charlie Daniels – Vocals, Fiddle, Guitar, Mandolin
- Joel "Taz" DiGregorio – Keyboards
- Jack Gavin – Percussion, Drums
- Bruce Brown – Guitar, Vocals
- Charlie Hayward – Bass
- Carolyn Corlew – Vocals
- Joy Gardner – Vocals
- Christ Church Choir – Vocals

== Production ==
- Ron W. Griffin – Producer, Engineer
- David Corlew – Executive-Producer
- John Ketton – Engineer
- John Thomas, II – Assistant Engineer
- Rick Cobbie – Assistant Engineer
- Tim LaMoy – Assistant Engineer
- Ed Torney – Assistant Engineer
- Roger Campbell – Guitar Technician
- Pete Green – Mixer
- Hank Williams – Masterer
- Bebe Evans – Production Coordinator
- Paula Szeigis – Production Coordinator
- Karen Philpott – Art Direction
- Sara Remke – Design

Track information and credits adapted from the album's liner notes.

== Charts ==
Chart (1994)	Peak position
US Top Christian Albums (Billboard)	26
