= High Lonesome (Charlie Daniels album) =

Studio album by The Charlie Daniels Band
- Released: November 5, 1976
- Genre: Country; rock; blues; bluegrass
- Length: 38:11
- Label: Epic
- Producer: Paul Hornsby

The Charlie Daniels Band chronology
Saddle Tramp (1976)	High Lonesome (1976)	Midnight Wind (1977)

Professional ratings
Review scores
Source	Rating
AllMusic	4/5 stars

High Lonesome is the eighth studio album by Charlie Daniels and the fifth as the Charlie Daniels Band, released on November 5, 1976. Many of the tracks pay homage to pulp Western fiction and, with permission, the album's title was named after the 1962 Western novel by Louis L’Amour.

== Track listing ==
All songs composed by the Charlie Daniels Band (Charlie Daniels, Tom Crain, Taz DiGregorio, Fred Edwards, Charles Hayward & Don Murray), except where indicated:

=== Side one ===
1. "Billy the Kid" (Daniels) – 5:49
2. "Carolina" – 3:54
3. "High Lonesome" – 5:03
4. "Running With the Crowd" – 4:01

=== Side two ===
1. "Right Now Tennessee Blues" (Daniels) – 3:36
2. "Roll Mississippi" – 3:12
3. "Slow Song" (Daniels) – 3:55
4. "Tennessee" (Crain) – 4:43
5. "Turned My Head Around" – 3:52

All of the credits above are direct from the original 1976 Epic LP. There has been some confusion as to certain of the album's songwriting credits over time because sites like AllMusic have incorrectly modified the credits by incorporating songs with the same titles together. For example, "Billy the Kid". "Dean" is shown as a co-writer sometimes now because Billy Dean released a song with the same title in 1991. Another example is "High Lonesome", which was written by the Charlie Daniels Band. Allmusic now incorrectly cites Gretchen Peters as a co-writer. This is because she wrote a song called "High Lonesome" in 1991 for Randy Travis's album, High Lonesome. Yet another case is with the song "Birmingham Blues" that Charlie Daniels wrote for their 1975 album, Nightrider. In 1977, Jeff Lynne also wrote a song called "Birmingham Blues" for his band, Electric Light Orchestra's album, Out of the Blue, and now Allmusic shows the 1975 Charlie Daniels song as being co-written by Lynne (but not the other way around).

== Personnel ==
The Charlie Daniels Band:

- Charlie Daniels – acoustic, electric and slide guitars, banjo, fiddle and vocals
- Tom Crain – acoustic, electric and slide guitars, vocal harmony, lead vocals on "Tennessee"
- Taz DiGregorio – acoustic and electric piano, organ, keyboards, vocals, vocal harmony, lead vocals on "Roll Mississippi"
- Fred Edwards – congas, drums
- Charlie Hayward – bass guitar
- Don Murray – congas, drums

Additional musicians:

- George McCorkle – acoustic guitar on "Billy The Kid"
- Toy Caldwell – steel guitar on "Slow Song" and "Tennessee"

Production personnel:

- Paul Hornsby – producer
- Kurt Kinzel – engineer
- Richard Schoff – assistant engineer
- Don Rubin – executive producer
- George Marino – mastering
- Joseph E. Sullivan – production supervisor

== Charts ==
Chart (1976–1977)	Peak position
US Billboard 200	83
US Top Country Albums (Billboard)	17
