= 16 Biggest Hits =

16 Biggest Hits is a series of albums issued by Legacy Recordings, a division of Sony Music.

== Notable releases ==
- 16 Biggest Hits (Alabama album), 2007
- 16 Biggest Hits (Lynn Anderson album), 2006
- 16 Biggest Hits (Clint Black album), 2006
- 16 Biggest Hits (Johnny Cash album), 1999
- 16 Biggest Hits (Johnny Cash and June Carter Cash album), 2006
- 16 Biggest Hits (Charlie Daniels album), 2006
- 16 Biggest Hits (John Denver album), 2006
- 16 Biggest Hits (Diamond Rio album), 2008
- 16 Biggest Hits (Merle Haggard album), 1998
- 16 Biggest Hits (Alan Jackson album), 2007
- 16 Biggest Hits (Waylon Jennings album), 2005
- 16 Biggest Hits (George Jones album), 1998
- 16 Biggest Hits (Lonestar album), 2006
- 16 Biggest Hits (Patty Loveless album), 2007
- 16 Biggest Hits (Ronnie Milsap album), 2007
- 16 Biggest Hits (Liza Minnelli album), 2000
- 16 Biggest Hits (Willie Nelson album), 1998
- 16 Biggest Hits, Volume II (Willie Nelson), 2007
- 16 Biggest Hits (Roy Orbison album), 1999
- 16 Biggest Hits (Collin Raye album), 2002
- 16 Biggest Hits (Ricky Van Shelton album), 1999
