= Glossary of international relations terms =

This is a list of terms related to the study of international relations. Many of these terms are also used in the study of sociology and game theory.

== A ==
=== Alliance ===
An alliance is an agreement between two or more states to pursue shared interests, typically involving military assistance.

=== Anarchy ===
A condition of not having an authority who can enforce rules on all actors. The International System in the 21st century is usually considered an Anarchy.

== B ==
=== Buck Passing ===
Buck Passing refers to the tendency of states to refuse to address a growing threat in the hopes that another state will.

=== Bipolarity ===
The state of having two superpowers in the international system. For example, the US and the USSR during the Cold War.

== C ==
=== Chain ganging ===
A group of alliances which require all members to declare war against the attacking party. The system of alliances which led to World War I through the Balkan Powder Keg are an example.

=== Chicken game ===
A chicken game is a situation where two states engage in brinkmanship even though the ideal solution is for one state to yield to the other. For example, the United States and the USSR risked global nuclear war to protect relatively minor strategic interests during the Cuban Missile Crisis.

=== Collective Action Problem ===
A situation where uncoordinated actions of each state will not result in the best outcome for any state.

=== Convention ===
An international agreement or treaty between three or more parties.

== D ==
=== Democratic peace theory ===
The theory that democratic states will normally not engage in war with each other.

=== Diplomacy ===
International negotiations usually conducted through diplomatic missions, the minister of foreign affairs, or the head of state.

== I ==
=== International law ===
A set of rules considered binding on the international community. Not considered true law by many theorists.

== M ==
=== model ===
The condition of having three or more super powers in the international system. For example, Europe before World War I

== P ==
=== Prisoner's dilemma ===
a Prisoner's dilemma is a situation where two states act in seemingly irrational ways due to their inability to make binding promises in the international system. For example, two rivals states might built up their respective military's even if neither wants to invade the other.

== R ==
=== Realism ===
International Relations theory based on the premise that states will act rationally to maximize their power which inevitably leads to conflict.

=== Regionalism ===
The expression of a common sense of identity and purpose combined with the creation and implementation of institutions that express a particular identity and shape collective action within a geographical region.

== S ==
=== Sanctions ===
When states prohibit their citizens from trading with or traveling to a target country in order to punish it or deter it without the use of military force.

=== Security Dilemma ===
A situation in international relations where a states decision to increase its security by expanding its military causes other states to do the same to protect their security interests creating a vicious cycle.

=== Sovereignty ===
The idea that states have the right to control what occurs within their borders.

=== Status quo state ===
A state that seeks to maintain the status quo the international system, in contrast to a revisionist state. For example, the United States in the contemporary international system.

== T ==
=== Treaty ===
An agreement between two or more states
