= Smokin' Armadillos (album) =

Studio album by Smokin' Armadillos
- Released: March 12, 1996
- Genre: Country
- Label: Curb
- Producer: Chris Farren; Chuck Howard; Smokin' Armadillos

Smokin' Armadillos chronology
Out of the Burrow (1993)	Smokin' Armadillos (1996)	Strike the Match (2003)

Smokin' Armadillos is the self-titled album of the American country music band Smokin' Armadillos. It was released in 1996 via MCG/Curb Records.

== Content ==
The album includes the singles "Let Your Heart Lead Your Mind" and "Thump Factor", which both entered the Hot Country Songs charts in 1996. "My Girlfriend Might" and "I'm a Cowboy" were previously included on the band's 1993 EP Out of the Burrow.

== Critical reception ==
Dan Kuchar of Country Standard Time gave a mixed review, saying that the band's "publicists seem to want to portray them as a country-fied New Kids on the Block". He praised the variety of stylistic influences and musicianship, but thought that the band had "yet to establish a sonic trademark for themselves". Jack Leaver of Allmusic rated it 3 stars out of 5, saying that the band "plays with an unbridled enthusiasm that serves the material well."

== Track listing ==
1. "Too Hot to Handle" (Steve Meeks) — 2:56
2. "The Big Bad Beat (Of My Broken Heart)" (Al Carmichael, Gary Griffin) — 2:49
3. "Miracle Man" (Al, Bird, Greg Barnhill) — 4:12
4. "Thump Factor" (Tony Martin, Scott Meeks) — 2:45
5. "Love of a Lifetime" (Scott Meeks) — 3:37
6. "When Will I Ever Learn" (Scott Meeks) — 3:48
7. "Let Your Heart Lead Your Mind" (Scott Meeks, Jason Theiste) — 3:30
8. "The Legend of Wooley Swamp" (Charlie Daniels, Tom Crain, Joel DiGregorio, Fred Edwards, James W. Marshall, Charlie Hayward) — 4:24
  - feat. Charlie Daniels
9. "Dance with a Brand New Partner" (Aaron Casida) — 3:33
10. "Could I Have Made It Back Then" (Cassida, Scott Meeks, Rick Russell) — 4:16
11. "I'm a Cowboy" (Josh Graham, B.J. Welle) — 4:22
12. "My Girlfriend Might" (Graham) — 4:36

== Personnel ==
Compiled from liner notes.

=== Musicians ===
Smokin' Armadillos

- Aaron Casida — bass guitar
- Josh Graham — rhythm guitar
- Darrin Kirkindoll — drums
- Scott Meeks — lead guitar, acoustic guitar
- Rick Russell — lead vocals
- Jason Theiste — fiddle

Additional musicians

- Eddie Bayers — drums
- Michael Black — background vocals
- Birch Caffee — piano, keyboards
- John Catchings — cello
- J. T. Corenflos — acoustic guitar
- Conni Ellisor — violin
- Larry Franklin — fiddle
- Rob Hajacos — fiddle
- Tony Harrell — piano, keyboards
- Mary Ann Kennedy — background vocals
- Brent Mason — electric guitar
- Terry McMillan — harmonica, percussion
- Steve Nathan — piano, keyboards
- Louis "Big Bad Beat" Nunley — background vocals
- Michael Rhodes — bass guitar
- Brent Rowan — electric guitar
- John Wesley Ryles — background vocals
- Kelly Shiver — background vocals
- Hank Singer — fiddle
- Michael Spriggs — acoustic guitar
- Neil Thrasher — background vocals
- John Willis — electric guitar
- Glenn Worf — bass guitar

== Production ==
All tracks produced by Chuck Howard. "I'm a Cowboy" co-produced by Chris Farren and Smokin' Armadillos; adapted from original dance mix by Chris Farren.

Tracks 1, 5, 6, 7, 9-12 arranged by Smokin' Armadillos; additional arrangement on tracks 5, 7, 9, 10 by Birch Caffee.

== Chart performance ==
=== Album ===
Chart (1996)	Peak position
U.S. Billboard Top Country Albums	37
U.S. Billboard Top Heatseekers	24

=== Singles ===
Year	Single	Peak chart positions
Year	Single	US Country
1996	"Let Your Heart Lead Your Mind"	53
1996	"Thump Factor"	68
