= A Decade of Hits =

A Decade of Hits may refer to:

- A Decade of Hits (Charlie Daniels album), 1983
- A Decade of Hits 1969–1979, a compilation album by The Allman Brothers Band
