= Simple Man (Charlie Daniels album) =

Studio album by The Charlie Daniels Band
- Released: October 17, 1989
- Recorded: Quad Studios, Nashville, Tennessee; Soundstage, Nashville, Tennessee
- Length: 35:14
- Label: Epic
- Producer: James Stroud

The Charlie Daniels Band chronology
Homesick Heroes (1988)	Simple Man (1989)	Christmas Time Down South (1990)

Professional ratings
Review scores
Source	Rating
Allmusic	4/5 stars

Simple Man is the sixteenth studio album by Charlie Daniels and the thirteenth as the Charlie Daniels Band, released on October 17, 1989. The album's most memorable song is the titular song, "Simple Man", which is not related to the Lynyrd Skynyrd song of the same name. "It's My Life" is a shorter version of a jam song previously released on their 1976 album, Saddle Tramp.

== Track listing ==
1. "(What This World Needs Is) A Few More Rednecks" (Charlie Daniels, Taz DiGregorio, Charles Hayward, Jack Gavin) - 3:44
2. "Was It 26" (Don Sampson) - 3:50
3. "Oh Atlanta" (Daniels, DiGregorio, Hayward, Gavin) - 3:19
4. "Midnight Wind" - (Daniels, Tom Crain, DiGregorio, Hayward, Gavin) - 3:20
5. "Saturday Night Down South" (Daniels, DiGregorio, Gavin, Hayward) - 3:04
6. "Play Me Some Fiddle" (Daniels, DiGregorio, Hayward, Gavin) - 4:25
7. "Simple Man" (Daniels, DiGregorio, Hayward, Gavin) - 3:24
8. "Old Rock 'N Roller" (Daniels, DiGregorio, Hayward, Gavin) - 2:58
9. "Mister DJ" - (Daniels, Crain, DiGregario, Hayward, Gavin) - 3:52
10. "It's My Life" - (Daniels, Crain, DiGregorio, Fred Edwards, Hayward, Don Murray) - 3:32

== Personnel ==
The Charlie Daniels Band:

- Charlie Daniels - guitar, fiddle, vocals
- Bruce Ray Brown - guitar, vocals
- Taz DiGregorio - keyboards
- Julian King - trumpet
- Jack Gavin - drums, percussion
- Charles Hayward - bass

== Production ==
- Producer: James Stroud
- Engineer: Lynn Peterzell
- Assisted by: Julian King, Tom Oates
- Cover photographer: David Michael Kennedy

== Catalog number ==
- CD Catalog Number: Epic Records EK 45316

== Chart performance ==
=== Weekly charts ===
Chart (1989–1990)	Peak position
US Billboard 200	82
US Top Country Albums (Billboard)	2

=== Year-end charts ===
Chart (1990)	Position
US Top Country Albums (Billboard)	7

=== Singles ===
Year	Single	Peak positions	
Year	Single	US Country	CAN Country
1989	"Simple Man"	12	15
1990	"Mister DJ"	34	45
1990	"(What This World Needs Is) A Few More Rednecks"	56	78
1990	"Oh Atlanta"	—	—

== Certifications ==
Region	Certification	Certified units/sales
United States (RIAA)	Platinum	1,000,000^{^}
^{^} Shipments figures based on certification alone.
