= Uneasy Rider (disambiguation) =

Uneasy Rider can refer to:

- "Uneasy Rider," a 1973 song by Charlie Daniels
- "Uneasy Rider '88," a similar 1988 song by the Charlie Daniels Band
- "Uneasy Rider," an episode in the 9th season (1993) of the British comedy drama Minder.
