= Road Dogs (Charlie Daniels album) =

Studio album by Charlie Daniels
- Released: May 30, 2000
- Recorded: Twin Pines Studios, Lebanon, Tennessee
- Genre: Rock and roll; Southern rock
- Label: Blue Hat
- Producer: Charlie Daniels; Patrick Kelly; David Corlew

Charlie Daniels chronology
| Volunteer Jam/Classic Live Performances: Volume two (1999) | Road Dogs (2000) | Live! (2001) |

Road Dogs is a studio album by The Charlie Daniels Band. It was released on May 30, 2000 courtesy of Blue Hat Records. All but two of the songs on the album were written by Charlie Daniels.

== Track listing ==
| No. | Title | Writer(s) | Length |
|---|---|---|---|
| 1. | "Road Dogs" | Charlie Daniels | 4:01 |
| 2. | "Ain't No Law in California" | Daniels | 4:36 |
| 3. | "Even Up the Score" | Bruce Ray Brown | 5:21 |
| 4. | "Across the Line" | Daniels | 7:22 |
| 5. | "The Martyr" | Daniels | 4:55 |
| 6. | "How Much I Love You" | Daniels | 5:30 |
| 7. | "Wild Wild Young Men" | Daniels | 3:40 |
| 8. | "Sidewinder" | Daniels | 7:04 |
| 9. | "Standing in the Rain" | "Taz" DiGregorio, Danielle Elks Gregorio | 4:17 |
| 10. | "It's About Time" | Daniels | 3:07 |
| 11. | "Sail Away" | Daniels | 5:07 |

== Personnel ==
- Charlie Daniels - Guitar, vocals
- "Taz" DiGregorio - Keyboards, vocals
- Charlie Hayward - Bass
- Chris Wormer - Guitar, string arrangements, vocals, background vocals
- David Angell - Violin
- John Catchings - Cello
- Carolyn Corlew - Background vocals
- David Davidson - Violin
- Pat McDonald - Drums, percussion
- Kathryn Plummer - Viola

== Critical reception ==
Professional ratings
Review scores
| Source | Rating |
|---|---|
| AllMusic | 4/5 stars |

Road Dogs received four stars out of five from Allmusic. Reviewer Michael B. Smith concludes that "This is one old dog [Charlie Daniels] who isn't even considering curling up on the porch and letting life pass him by. He's rockin', but it's not in a rocking chair, it's behind a Gibson guitar."
