= Homesick Heroes =

Studio album by The Charlie Daniels Band
- Released: August 15, 1988
- Recorded: May 1988
- Studio: Eleven Eleven Sound Studios, Sound Stage Studios, Nashville, TN
- Length: 38:11
- Label: Epic
- Producer: James Stroud

The Charlie Daniels Band chronology
Powder Keg (1987)	Homesick Heroes (1988)	Simple Man (1989)

Professional ratings
Review scores
Source	Rating
Allmusic	2.5/5 stars

Homesick Heroes is the fifteenth studio album by Charlie Daniels and the twelfth as the Charlie Daniels Band, released on August 15, 1988. The album is known for the band's cover of the Jimmy Dean classic, "Big Bad John," which also includes guest harmony vocals by The Oak Ridge Boys, and for the song "Uneasy Rider '88" which is musically and thematically similar to their renowned 1973 song "Uneasy Rider" but with a story set in a Houston, Texas gay bar.

== Track listing ==
All songs written by the Charlie Daniels Band (Charlie Daniels, Tom Crain, Taz DiGregorio, Charles Hayward & Jack Gavin), except where noted:

1. "Boogie Woogie Fiddle Country Blues" - 3:26
2. "Alligator" - 3:51
3. "Get Me Back to Dixie" (Crain, Rick Rentz) - 3:07
4. "Boogie Woogie Man" - 3:52
5. "Cowboy Hat in Dallas" - 4:29
6. "Big Bad John" (featuring The Oak Ridge Boys) (Jimmy Dean, Roy Acuff) - 3:37
7. "Midnight Train" - 4:19
8. "Honky Tonk Avenue" - 3:36
9. "You Can't Pick Cotton" - 3:51
10. "Ill Wind" - 3:35
11. "Uneasy Rider '88" - 4:25

== Personnel ==
- Charlie Daniels - banjo, fiddle, mandolin, guitar, lead vocals
- Tom Crain - guitar, background vocals
- Taz DiGregorio - keyboards, background vocals
- Charlie Hayward - bass guitar
- Russ Powell - guitar
- Jack Gavin - drums, percussion
- The Oak Ridge Boys - background vocals on "Big Bad John"
- James Stroud - percussion, background vocals

== Charts ==
=== Weekly charts ===
Chart (1988)	Peak position
US Billboard 200	181
US Top Country Albums (Billboard)	16

=== Year-end charts ===
Chart (1989)	Position
US Top Country Albums (Billboard)	45
