= Volunteer Jam/Classic Live Performances: Volume One =

Volunteer Jam/Classic Live Performances: Volume one

Live album by Charlie Daniels and various
- Released: April 20, 1999
- Length: 46:08
- Label: Blue Hat Records

Charlie Daniels and various chronology
Tailgate Party (1999)	Volunteer Jam/Classic Live Performances: Volume one (1999)	Volunteer Jam/Classic Live Performances: Volume two (1999)

Volunteer Jam/ Classic Live Performances: Volume one is a compilation album of live performances from previous Volunteer Jam concerts and albums by American musician Charlie Daniels.

== Track listing ==
1. Can't You See (performed by Toy Caldwell, Paul T. Riddle, Papa John Creach, Grinderswitch, Bonnie Bramlett, Wet Willie, Chuck Leavell, and CDB) 5:30
2. Statesboro Blues (performed by Charlie Daniels, Jimmy Hall, and Sea Level) 6:28
3. Funny How Time Slips Away/Crazy/Night Life (performed by Toy Caldwell and Willie Nelson) 8:25
4. Mississippi Queen (performed by Molly Hatchet and Ted Nugent) 3:08
5. Lady Luck (performed by Grinderswitch) 5:08
6. Down Home Blues (performed by CDB, Papa John Creach, and LA Reflection Section) 5:30
7. Keep on Smiling (performed by Richie Cannata and Wet Willie) 6:48
8. The South's Gonna Do It (Again) (performed by Charlie Daniels and Jimmy Hall) 5:11
