= Midnight Wind =

Studio album by The Charlie Daniels Band
- Released: October 7, 1977
- Studio: Capricorn Sound Studios
- Length: 37:48
- Label: Epic
- Producer: Paul Hornsby

The Charlie Daniels Band chronology
High Lonesome (1976)	Midnight Wind (1977)	Million Mile Reflections (1979)

Professional ratings
Review scores
Source	Rating
AllMusic	3/5 stars

Midnight Wind is the ninth studio album by Charlie Daniels and the sixth as the Charlie Daniels Band, released on October 7, 1977. It was certified Gold by the RIAA on February 10, 1995.

== Critical reception ==
Stephen Thomas Erlewine of AllMusic says, "Midnight Wind is an overlooked title in the Charlie Daniels Band oeuvre, never appearing on CD until Raven released an expanded version called Midnight Wind...Plus in 2009."

== Track listing ==
All tracks are written by The Charlie Daniels Band (Charlie Daniels, Tom Crain, Taz DiGregorio, Fred Edwards, Charles Hayward & Don Murray), unless otherwise noted.

Side A

No.	Title	Writer(s)	Length
1.	"Midnight Wind"		4:20
2.	"Sugar Hill Saturday Night"	Charlie Daniels; Taz DiGregorio; Tom Crain	3:41
3.	"Heaven Can Be Anywhere"	Charlie Daniels	3:15
4.	"Maria Teresa"	Charlie Daniels; Taz DiGregorio	4:39
5.	"Indian Man"	Charlie Daniels	3:12
Total length:			19:07

Side B

No.	Title	Writer(s)	Length
1.	"Grapes of Wrath"	Charlie Daniels	3:10
2.	"Redneck Fiddlin' Man"		5:12
3.	"Ode To Sweet Smoky"	Tom Crain	3:29
4.	"Good Ole Boy"		4:10
5.	"Black Bayou"		2:40
Total length:			18:41

== Personnel ==
The Charlie Daniels Band

- Charlie Daniels – vocals, guitar, fiddle
- Tom Crain – guitar, vocals
- Taz DiGregorio – keyboards, vocals
- Fred Edwards – drums, percussion
- Charlie Hayward – bass
- Don Murray – drums, percussion

Guest musicians

- Paul Riddle – congas on "Heaven Can Be Anywhere"; roto toms on "Indian Man"
- Leo LaBranche – string arrangement on "Heaven Can Be Anywhere"

== Production ==
- Paul Hornsby – Producer
- Kurt Kinzel – Engineer
- Steve Tillisch – Assistant engineer
- Don Rubin – Executive producer
- George Marino – Mastering
- Joseph E. Sullivan – Production supervisor

Track information and credits adapted from the album's liner notes.

== Charts ==
Chart (1977)	Peak position
US Billboard 200	105
US Top Country Albums (Billboard)	42

== Certifications ==
Region	Certification	Certified units/sales
United States (RIAA)	Gold	500,000^{^}
^{^} Shipments figures based on certification alone.
