= Way Down Yonder =

Studio album by Charlie Daniels
- Released: 1974; 1977 (re-release)
- Genre: Southern rock
- Length: 37:04
- Labels: Kama Sutra; Epic (re-release)
- Producer: Charlie Daniels

Charlie Daniels chronology
Honey in the Rock (1973)	Way Down Yonder (1974)	Fire on the Mountain (1974)

Way Down Yonder is the fourth studio album by American musician Charlie Daniels and the first as the Charlie Daniels Band, originally released in 1974 as a studio album courtesy of Kama Sutra Records. It was re-released in 1977 under the name Whiskey, courtesy of Epic Records.

== Critical reception ==
Professional ratings
Review scores
Source	Rating
AllMusic	2.5/5 stars

Whiskey received a two-and-a-half star rating from AllMusic and its review by Jim Worbois says that "a whole album of Daniels's brand of Southern boogie may be a bit much for the average listener but fans will eat it up. This isn't a bad record to listen to but there isn't anything here to recommend either."

== Track listing ==
All songs written by Charlie Daniels.

1. "I've Been Down" - 3:37
2. "Give This Fool Another Try" - 8:07
3. "Low Down Lady" - 4:10
4. "Land of Opportunity" - 3:02
5. "Way Down Yonder" - 3:36
6. "Whiskey" - 5:40
7. "I'll Always Remember That Song" - 4:24
8. "Looking for My Mary Jane" - 4:28

== Personnel ==
- Charlie Daniels - Audio production, composer, guitar, vocals
- Taz DiGregorio - Keyboards, vocals
- Barry Barnes - Guitar, vocals
- Billy Cox - Bass
- Mark Fitzgerald - Bass, vocals
- Buddy Davis - Drums
- Gary Allen - Drums
- Fred Edwards - Drums
- Lea Jane Berinati - Vocals
