= Redneck Fiddlin' Man =

Studio album by Charlie Daniels
- Released: July 23, 2002
- Label: Audium Entertainment
- Producer: Charlie Daniels; Patrick Kelly; David Corlew

Charlie Daniels chronology
How Sweet the Sound: 25 Favorite Hymns and Gospel Greats (2002)	Redneck Fiddlin' Man (2002)	A Merry Christmas to All (2002)

Professional ratings
Review scores
Source	Rating
Allmusic	3/5 stars

Redneck Fiddlin' Man is an album by American musician Charlie Daniels. It was released on July 23, 2002 and peaked at number 40 on the Top Country Albums chart.

== Track listing ==
1. "Rock This Joint"
2. "Waco"
3. "Little Joe and Big Bill"
4. "Last Fallen Hero"
5. "Southern Boy" (with Travis Tritt)
6. "High Speed Heroes"
7. "Fais Do Do"
8. "Muddy Mississippi"
9. "Redneck Fiddlin' Man"
10. "Crosstown Traffic" (instrumental)
11. "My Baby Plays Me Just Like a Fiddle"
12. "The Star-Spangled Banner" (instrumental)

== Critical reception ==
Redneck Fiddlin' Man received three stars out of five from Robert L. Doerschuk of Allmusic. He concludes that "No surprises here -- but the Charlie Daniels Band is never about surprise. As with most artists who define themselves according to established musical traditions, their goal is to conform to audience expectations. Daniels isn't the most nuanced singer out there, nor the smoothest fiddler -- but within the confines of the style, which means the span from squint-eyed menace to keg-popping jocularity, no one matches his vocal expressiveness."

== Chart performance ==
=== Album ===
Redneck Fiddlin' Man peaked at number 40 on the Top Country Albums chart and at number 44 on the Top Independent Albums chart.

Chart (2002)	Peak position
U.S. Billboard Top Country Albums	40
U.S. Billboard Top Independent Albums	44

=== Singles ===
Year	Single	Peak positions
Year	Single	US Country
2002	"Southern Boy"	51

== Personnel ==
- Charlie Daniels - Fiddle, mandolin, viola, vocals, background vocals
- Joel "Taz" DiGregorio - Keyboards, Hammond organ, vocals
- Charlie Hayward - Electric bass
- Pat McDonald - Drums, percussion
- Garth Brooks - Background vocals
- Bruce Brown - Acoustic guitar, electric guitar, background vocals
- Mark Matejka - Acoustic guitar, electric guitar, background vocals
