= Full Moon (Charlie Daniels album) =

Charlie Daniels record

Studio album by The Charlie Daniels Band
- Released: July 18, 1980
- Studios: Woodland (Nashville, Tennessee); Record Plant (Los Angeles, California)
- Length: 37:27
- Label: Epic
- Producer: John Boylan

The Charlie Daniels Band chronology
Million Mile Reflections (1979)	Full Moon (1980)	Windows (1982)

Professional ratings
Review scores
Source	Rating
AllMusic	3/5 stars
The Rolling Stone Album Guide	2.5/5 stars

Full Moon is the eleventh studio album by Charlie Daniels and the eighth as the Charlie Daniels Band, released on July 18, 1980. It produced two hit singles for the band, "In America" and "The Legend of Wooley Swamp". The group dedicated the album to Tommy Caldwell, who had died on April 28, 1980.

== Track listing ==
All songs composed by the Charlie Daniels Band (Charlie Daniels, Tom Crain, Taz DiGregorio, Fred Edwards, Charles Hayward & James W. Marshall), except where indicated:

1. "The Legend of Wooley Swamp" - 4:18
2. "Carolina (I Remember You)" - 5:13
3. "Lonesome Boy from Dixie" (Crain, Jody Williams) - 4:45
4. "No Potion for the Pain" (DiGregorio, Greg Wohlgemuth) - 4:25
5. "El Toreador" - 3:26
6. "South Sea Song" - 4:32
7. "Dance, Gypsy, Dance" (Daniels) - 3:34
8. "Money" (Crain) - 3:58
9. "In America" - 3:21

== Personnel ==
The Charlie Daniels Band:

- Charlie Daniels - guitar, fiddle, vocals
- Tom Crain - guitar, vocals
- Taz DiGregorio - keyboards, vocals
- Fred Edwards - drums, percussion
- Charles Hayward - bass
- James W. Marshall - drums, percussion

Additional musicians:

- Bergen White - string arrangements

== Production ==
- Producer: John Boylan
- Engineer: Paul Grupp
- Assisted by: Russ Martin, Phil Jamtaas, Ed Cherney, Cary Pritkin
- Production supervisor: Joseph E. Sullivan
- Cover illustration: Bill Myers

== Catalog number ==
- Original LP Catalog Number: Epic Records FE 36571
- CD Catalog Number: Epic Records EK 36571

== Charts ==
Chart (1980)	Peak position
Australian Albums (Kent Music Report)	100
Canada Top Albums/CDs (RPM)	40
US Billboard 200	11
US Top Country Albums (Billboard)	5

== Certifications ==
Region	Certification	Certified units/sales
United States (RIAA)	Platinum	1,000,000^{^}
^{^} Shipments figures based on certification alone.
