= Honey in the Rock (album) =

Studio album by Charlie Daniels Band
- Released: May 1973
- Studio: Mercury Custom Recording Studio, Nashville, Tennessee
- Length: 46:51
- Label: Kama Sutra
- Producer: Charlie Daniels

Charlie Daniels Band chronology
Te John, Grease, & Wolfman (1972)	Honey in the Rock (1973)	Way Down Yonder (1974)

Professional ratings
Review scores
Source	Rating
AllMusic	3/5 stars
Christgau's Record Guide	B−

Honey in the Rock is the third studio album by American musician Charlie Daniels, released in 1973, appearing on the record label Kama Sutra Records. It was re-released on Epic Records in 1976 under the title Uneasy Rider.

== Track listing ==
All tracks are written by Charlie Daniels.

Side One
No.	Title	Length
1.	"Funky Junky"	3:03
2.	"Big Man"	6:16
3.	"Why Can't People"	5:48
4.	"Revelations"	7:34

Side Two
No.	Title	Length
1.	"Uneasy Rider"	5:19
2.	"Midnight Lady"	5:13
3.	"Somebody Loves You"	3:30
4.	"No Place to Go"	10:08

== Personnel ==
- Charlie Daniels - guitar, banjo, mandolin, vocals
- Joel DiGregorio - piano, organ, backing vocals
- Earl Grigsby - bass, backing vocals
- Buddy Davis - drums, bongos
- Fred Edwards - drums, congas

Technical

- Neil Wilburn - engineer
- Ruby Mazur - photography, design

== Charts ==
Chart (1973)	Peak position
US Billboard 200	164
