= William the Kid =

William the Kid, Willie the Kid, Willy the Kid, may refer to:

== People ==
- A reference to Billy the Kid (1859–1881), U.S. outlaw
- William 'The Kid' O'Connell, a collaborator of William 'Joey' Hollebone
- Willie the Kid (rapper) (born 1985), U.S. musician

== Fictional characters ==
- William the Kid, the evil CEO in the videogame Spy Fox in "Dry Cereal"
- William "The Kid" Hardy, a character from the film Cimarron (1960 film)
- Willy the Kid, a character from the film Halloween Ends
- Willy the Kid, a character from the cardgame Bang! (card game)

== Other uses ==
- Willie the Kid (born 1937), a Canadian thoroughbred racehorse
- Willy the Kid, a comic book by Leo Baxendale

== See also ==
- Billy the Kid (disambiguation)
- William Kidd (disambiguation)
