= Volunteer Jam/Classic Live Performances: Volume Two =

Live album by Various Artists
- Released: June 1, 1999
- Length: 45:49
- Label: Blue Hat records

Various Artists chronology
Volunteer Jam/Classic Live Performances: Volume One (1999)	Volunteer Jam/Classic Live Performances: Volume Two (1999)	Road Dogs (2000)

Volunteer Jam/Classic Live Performances: Volume Two is a compilation album of live performances by the Charlie Daniels Band and various artists. It is the sequel to Volunteer Jam/Classic Live Performances: Volume One and is a compilation of performances from previous Volunteer Jam concerts and albums. The other artists featured on this album are Wet Willie, Dobie Gray, Jimmy Hall, L.A. Reflection Section, Ted Nugent, Louisiana's LeRoux, Willie Nelson, Delbert McClinton, and Al Kooper. Volunteer Jam/Classic Live Performances: Volume Two was released on June 1, 1999, courtesy of Blue Hat records.

== Track listing ==
1. Street Corner Serenade (performed by Wet Willie) 5:48
2. Trudy (performed by Charlie Daniels) 4:56
3. The Night They Drove Old Dixie Down (performed by Dobie Gray) 6:51
4. (Your Love Has Lifted Me) Higher and Higher (performed by Jimmy Hall and L.A. Reflection Section) 5:21
5. Carol (performed by CDB, L.A. Reflection Section, and Ted Nugent) 5:19
6. New Orleans Ladies (performed by Louisiana's LeRoux) 4:22
7. Good Hearted Woman (performed by Willie Nelson) 3:14
8. Shaky Ground (performed by Delbert McClinton) 3:34
9. Do the Funky Chicken (performed by CDB, Al Kooper, and L.A. Reflection Section) 6:24

== Review ==
Professional ratings
Review scores
Source	Rating
Allmusic	3/5 stars

Volunteer Jam/Classic Live Performances: Volume Two received three stars out of five from Michael B. Smith of allmusic. Smith concludes that "with a vault full of these timeless recordings, we can only hope that Charlie Daniels and Blue Hat will see fit to release even more as time goes on."
