= How Sweet the Sound: 25 Favorite Hymns and Gospel Greats =

Album by Charlie Daniels

Studio album by Charlie Daniels
- Released: January 29, 2002
- Label: Sparrow
- Producer: Charlie Daniels; Ron W. Griffin; David Corlew; Patrick Kelly

Charlie Daniels chronology
Live! (2001)	How Sweet the Sound: 25 Favorite Hymns and Gospel Greats (2002)	Redneck Fiddlin' Man (2002)

Professional ratings
Review scores
Source	Rating
Allmusic	2/5 stars

How Sweet the Sound: 25 Favorite Hymns and Gospel Greats is a studio double album by American rock band the Charlie Daniels Band. The album sees the band performing Christian hymns in their style. According to Daniels, "I didn’t want to do it in a churchy way, [...] I wanted to do it like CDB would do it." Released on January 29, 2002 through Sparrow Records, the album peaked at number 40 on the Top Country Albums chart.

== Track listing ==
=== Disc 1 ===
1. "Amazing Grace"
2. "Precious Lord, Take My Hand"
3. "In the Garden"
4. "Softly and Tenderly"
5. "Abide with Me"
6. "I Saw the Light"
7. "Just a Closer Walk with Thee"
8. "Just a Little Talk with Jesus"
9. "Swing Down Sweet Chariot"
10. "Nothing but the Blood"
11. "I'll Fly Away"
12. "How Great Thou Art"

=== Disc 2 ===
1. "Somebody Was Praying for Me"
2. "They Tell Me of a Home"
3. "Are You Washed in the Blood"
4. "The Old Rugged Cross"
5. "What a Friend We Have in Jesus"
6. "Blessed Assurance"
7. "Peace in the Valley"
8. "In the Sweet By-and-By"
9. "I am Thine O Lord"
10. "Come Unto Me"
11. "Kneel at the Cross"
12. "Life's Railway to Heaven"
13. "There is Power in the Blood"

== Personnel ==
- Charlie Daniels - Banjo, acoustic bass, fiddle, electric guitar, mandolin
- Joel "Taz" DiGregorio - Keyboards, Hammond organ, piano
- Charlie Hayward - Acoustic bass, electric bass
- Chris Wormer - String arrangements
- Pat McDonald - Drums, percussion
- Darryl Appleton - Choir, chorus
- Bonnie Bramlett - Background vocals
- Bruce Ray Brown - Acoustic guitar, electric guitar, background vocals
- Reginald Brown - Choir, chorus
- Albert E. Brumley - Background vocals
- Theresa Comer - Choir, chorus
- Carolyn Corlew - Background vocals
- Angel Cruz - Background vocals
- Everett Drake - Choir, chorus
- Mark Matejka - Acoustic guitar, electric guitar, background vocals
- Ann McCrary - Choir, chorus
- Michael Mellett - Background vocals
- Gene Miller - Background vocals
- Tony Skinner - Background vocals

== Charts ==
Chart (2002)	Peak position
U.S. Billboard Top Country Albums	40
U.S. Billboard Top Contemporary Christian	23
