= William Kidd (disambiguation) =

William Kidd (1645–1701) was a Scottish sailor who was tried and executed for piracy.

William, Bill or Billy Kidd may also refer to:

- William Kidd (painter) (1796–1863), Scottish painter
- Billy Kidd (footballer) (1908–1978), English footballer
- William Matthew Kidd (1918–1998), United States federal judge
- Billy Kidd (born 1943), American ski racer
- Bill Kidd (American politician) (born 1952), member of the Missouri House of Representatives
- Bill Kidd (born 1956), Scottish National Party politician
- Billy Kidd (American football) (born 1959), American football center
- William Kidd (composer) (fl. 1987–2012), American musician, orchestrator, and composer

== See also ==
- William Kyd (fl. 1430–1453), English pirate
- Captain Kidd (disambiguation)
- William the Kid (disambiguation)
- Billy the Kid (disambiguation)
