= Fire on the Mountain (album) =

Studio album with live tracks by Charlie Daniels Band
- Released: November 29, 1974
- Studios: Capricorn Studios; Macon, Georgia
- Genres: Country rock; blues rock
- Length: 42:39
- Labels: Kama Sutra; Capitol
- Producer: Paul Hornsby

Charlie Daniels Band chronology
Way Down Yonder (1974)	Fire on the Mountain (1974)	Nightrider (1975)

Singles from Fire on the Mountain
- 1. "The South's Gonna Do It" Released: January 1975; 2. "Long Haired Country Boy" Released: April 1975

Professional ratings
Review scores
Source	Rating
AllMusic	5/5 stars
The Rolling Stone Album Guide	3/5 stars

Fire on the Mountain is the fifth studio album by Charlie Daniels and the second as the Charlie Daniels Band, released in 1974, appearing on the record label Kama Sutra Records, then later in 1976 by Epic Records. Most of the tracks on the album are studio recordings, while the last two songs are live performances, recorded at the War Memorial Auditorium, Nashville, Tennessee on October 4, 1974. This album was certified Platinum by the RIAA on January 22, 1992.

Early pressings of the album contained a bonus three song, seven inch, 45 RPM disc. Side one was "Volunteer Jam Part (1)" and side two was "Volunteer Jam contd. Part (2)" and "Volunteer Jam contd. Part (3)". The catalogue number of this disc is KSBS-EP-10.

== Track listing ==
All songs composed by the bandleader, Charlie Daniels, except where indicated:

Side one

1. "Caballo Diablo" - 4:28
2. "Long Haired Country Boy" - 4:03
3. "Trudy" - 4:51
4. "Georgia" - 3:06
5. "Feeling Free" (Barry Barnes) - 4:10

Side two

1. "The South's Gonna Do It" - 4:00
2. "New York City, King Size Rosewood Bed" - 3:26
3. "No Place to Go" (Live) - 11:24
4. "Orange Blossom Special" (Live Instrumental) (Ervin T. Rouse) - 3:00

== Personnel ==
Band members:

- Charlie Daniels – electric, slide and acoustic guitars, banjo, fiddle, lead vocals
- Joel "Taz" DiGregorio – keyboards, vocals
- Barry Barnes – electric and acoustic guitars, vocals
- Mark Fitzgerald – bass guitar
- Gary Allen – drums, percussion
- Fred Edwards – drums

Additional musicians:

- Richard Betts – dobro on "Long Haired Country Boy"
- Jaimie Nichol – congas on "New York City, King Size Rosewood Bed", "No Place To Go" and "Feeling Free"

Additional personnel:

- Paul Hornsby – production
- Roslav Szaybo and Simon Cantwell – design
- James Flournoy Holmes and Kent Griggs – cover art and photography
- Ovie Sparks – engineer
- Tony Humphreys – assistant engineer

== Charts ==
Chart (1974–1975)	Peak position
Australian Albums (Kent Music Report)	71
Canada Top Albums/CDs (RPM)	51
US Billboard 200	38

== Certifications ==
Region	Certification	Certified units/sales
United States (RIAA)	Platinum	1,000,000^{^}
^{^} Shipments figures based on certification alone.
