= Windows (Charlie Daniels album) =

Studio album by The Charlie Daniels Band
- Released: March 5, 1982
- Recorded: Woodland (Nashville, Tennessee)
- Length: 40:16
- Label: Epic
- Producer: John Boylan

The Charlie Daniels Band chronology
Full Moon (1980)	Windows (1982)	A Decade of Hits (1983)

Professional ratings
Review scores
Source	Rating
Allmusic	2.5/5 stars

Windows is the twelfth studio album by Charlie Daniels and the ninth as the Charlie Daniels Band, released on March 5, 1982.

== Track listing ==
All songs composed by the Charlie Daniels Band (Charlie Daniels, Tom Crain, Taz DiGregorio, Fred Edwards, Charles Hayward & James W. Marshall), except where indicated:

1. "Still in Saigon" (Dan Daley) - 3:51
2. "Ain't No Ramblers Anymore" - 3:55
3. "The Lady in Red" (DiGregorio, Clare Michelle DiGregorio) - 3:32
4. "We Had It All One Time" (Daniels) - 4:38
5. "Partyin' Gal" - 3:33
6. "Ragin' Cajun" - 4:10
7. "Makes You Want to Go Home" - 4:30
8. "Blowing Along With the Wind" - 4:52
9. "Nashville Moon" (Crain) - 3:30
10. "The Universal Hand" - 3:48

== Charts ==
Chart (1982)	Peak position
US Billboard 200	26
US Top Country Albums (Billboard)	7

== Certifications ==
Region	Certification	Certified units/sales
United States (RIAA)	Gold	500,000^{^}
^{^} Shipments figures based on certification alone.
