= Saddle Tramp (album) =

Studio album by The Charlie Daniels Band
- Released: March 29, 1976
- Genres: Country; blues; jazz; bluegrass
- Length: 37:28
- Label: Epic
- Producer: Paul Hornsby

The Charlie Daniels Band chronology
Nightrider (1974)	Saddle Tramp (1976)	High Lonesome (1976)

Professional ratings
Review scores
Source	Rating
Allmusic	4/5 stars

Saddle Tramp is the seventh studio album by Charlie Daniels and the fourth as the Charlie Daniels Band, released on March 29, 1976. The album was certified Gold by the RIAA on September 4, 1981.

== Track listing ==
All songs composed by the Charlie Daniels Band (Charlie Daniels, Tom Crain, Taz DiGregorio, Fred Edwards, Charles Hayward & Don Murray), except where indicated:

=== Side one ===
1. "Dixie on My Mind" - 2:38
2. "Saddle Tramp" - 11:00
3. "Sweet Louisiana" (Daniels) - 4:41

=== Side two ===
1. "Wichita Jail" (Daniels) - 2:50
2. "Cumberland Mountain Number Nine" (Crain) - 4:46
3. "It's My Life" - 6:08
4. "Sweetwater, Texas" (Daniels) - 5:36

== Personnel ==
The Charlie Daniels Band:

- Charlie Daniels – guitar, fiddle, vocals
- Taz DiGregorio – keyboard, vocals
- Tom Crain – guitar, vocals
- Charlie Hayward – bass
- Don Murray – drums
- Fred Edwards – drums

Additional musicians:

- Toy Caldwell – steel guitar (tracks: B4)
- Jai Johanny Johanson – congas (tracks: A2)

Production personnel:

- Kurt Kinzel – engineer
- Richard Schoff – assistant engineer
- Don Rubin – executive producer
- George Marino – mastering
- Paul Hornsby – producer
- Joseph E. Sullivan – production supervisor

== Charts ==
Chart (1976)	Peak position
Canada Top Albums/CDs (RPM)	52
US Billboard 200	35
US Top Country Albums (Billboard)	7

== Certifications ==
Region	Certification	Certified units/sales
United States (RIAA)	Gold	500,000^{^}
^{^} Shipments figures based on certification alone.
