= Nightrider (album) =

Studio album by Charlie Daniels Band
- Released: November 25, 1975
- Genres: Rock; blues; country; bluegrass
- Length: 38:57
- Label: Sony
- Producer: Paul Hornsby

Charlie Daniels Band chronology
Fire on the Mountain (1974)	Nightrider (1975)	Saddle Tramp (1976)

Professional ratings
Review scores
Source	Rating
Allmusic	4.5/5 stars

Nightrider is the sixth studio album by Charlie Daniels and the third as the Charlie Daniels Band, released on November 25, 1975.

== Track listing ==
All songs composed by the bandleader, Charlie Daniels, except where indicated:

=== Side one ===
1. "Texas" - 3:04
2. "Willie Jones" - 3:14
3. "Franklin Limestone" (Tom Crain) - 5:40
4. "Evil" - 2:53
5. "Everything Is Kinda All Right" - 5:11

=== Side two ===
1. "Funky Junky" - 5:06
2. "Birmingham Blues" - 4:43
3. "Damn Good Cowboy" - 4:35
4. "Tomorrow's Gonna Be Another Day" - 3:31

There has been some confusion with the credits for the song "Birmingham Blues" that Charlie Daniels wrote for this 1975 album. In 1977, Jeff Lynne also wrote a song called "Birmingham Blues" for his band, Electric Light Orchestra's album, Out of the Blue, and now Allmusic shows the 1975 Charlie Daniels song as being co-written by Lynne (but not the other way around), which is nonsensical.

== Personnel ==
The Charlie Daniels Band:

- Charlie Daniels – banjo, fiddle, guitar, mandolin, vocals
- Taz DiGregorio – keyboards, vocals
- Tom Crain – guitar, vocals
- Charlie Hayward – bass guitar
- Don Murray – drums
- Fred Edwards – drums

Additional musicians:

- Toy Caldwell – steel guitar on "Damn Good Cowboy"
- Jai Johanny Johanson – Congas on "Everything Is Kinda All Right"

Production personnel:

- Richard Schoff – assistant engineer
- Paul Hornsby – producer

== Charts ==
Chart (1975–1976)	Peak position
Australian Albums (Kent Music Report)	99
US Billboard 200	57
US Top Country Albums (Billboard)	27
