= Captain Kidd, Wapping =

Pub in Wapping, East London

Coordinates: 51.5033°N 0.0583°W

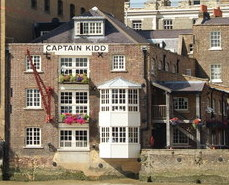
The Captain Kidd pub in Wapping

The Captain Kidd is a pub in Wapping, East London, that is named after the seventeenth-century pirate William Kidd, who was executed at the nearby Execution Dock. The pub is a Grade II listed building, and was historically used as a coffee warehouse.

== History ==
The Captain Kidd pub is situated at 108 Wapping High Street, next door to the Marine Police Force headquarters. The building originates in the 19th century as a three-storey brick house, and was remodelled in the Edwardian era. To the rear of the building, there is a former workshop that goes out to a wharf. The building, along with 110 Wapping High Street, are now Grade II listed.

In the 1980s, the building became a pub, having previously been a coffee warehouse. It was named after the seventeenth century pirate William Kidd, who was executed at the nearby Execution Dock in 1701. The pub has a nautical theme and retells the story of Captain Kidd and his execution; the layout is designed to be similar to a ship's hulk. It is a Samuel Smith Old Brewery pub, and is situated on Wapping High Street. The entrance has a large archway, and the pub has three floors and a terrace overlooking the River Thames.
