= Songs from the Longleaf Pines =

Studio album by Charlie Daniels
- Released: March 22, 2005
- Genre: Bluegrass; gospel
- Label: Koch
- Producer: Scott Rouse; David Corlew; BeBe Evans

Charlie Daniels chronology
| Essential Super Hits (2004) | Songs from the Longleaf Pines (2005) | 16 Biggest Hits (2006) |

Songs from the Longleaf Pines is an album by American musician Charlie Daniels. Released on March 22, 2005, the album was Daniels' first album to fully focus on bluegrass gospel music, after previously incorporating elements of the two styles on previously released songs.

== Critical reception ==
Professional ratings
Review scores
| Source | Rating |
|---|---|
| Allmusic | 4/5 stars |

Stephen Thomas Erlewine of Allmusic concludes that "Songs from the Longleaf Pines is Charlie Daniels' tribute to bluegrass-gospel -- a tribute album that covers two rarely touched-upon aspects of Daniels' music. He's recorded bluegrass numbers before, and his music certainly has been informed by it, but he's never done a full-fledged bluegrass album before and, apart from a low-budget collection in the early 2000s, he's never done an all-out gospel record. So, this is a first, which would be noteworthy in of itself, but the truly remarkable thing about Songs from the Longleaf Pines is that it's a lively, passionate, invigorating record that's his best album in quite some time. Perhaps this isn't the flashiest album Daniels has cut, or the rowdiest, but its low-key, modest charms make this a minor gem in his catalog."

== Track listing ==
1. "Walking in Jerusalem (Just Like John)"
2. "Preachin', Prayin', Singin'"
3. "I've Found a Hiding Place"
4. "I'm Working on a Building"
5. "The 91st Psalm" (recitation)
6. "Keep On the Sunny Side"
7. "Softly and Tenderly"
8. "The Old Account "
9. "I'll Fly Away" (instrumental)
10. "How Great Thou Art"
11. "The 23rd Psalm" (recitation)
12. "What Would You Give (In Exchange For Your Soul)"
13. "The Old Crossroads"

== Personnel ==
- Charlie Daniels - fiddle, guitar, vocals
- Mike Bub - bass
- Jason Carter - fiddle
- Tim May - guitar
- Rob McCoury - banjo
- Ronnie McCoury - mandolin
- Scott Rouse - guitar, harmonica, vocals, background vocals
- Chris Thile - composer, mandolin
- Cyndi Wheeler - vocals
- Earl Scruggs - banjo, guest appearance
- Ricky Skaggs - vocals, guest appearance
- The Whites - vocals, background vocals, guest appearance
- Mac Wiseman - vocals, background vocals, guest appearance
