= Te John, Grease, & Wolfman =

Studio album by Charlie Daniels
- Released: 1972
- Studio: Electric Lady, New York City
- Genre: Southern rock
- Length: 38:16
- Label: Kama Sutra
- Producer: Gary Klein

Charlie Daniels chronology
Charlie Daniels (1971)	Te John, Grease, & Wolfman (1972)	Honey in the Rock (1973)

Te John, Grease, & Wolfman is the second studio album by American musician Charlie Daniels, released in 1972. The name comes from the band members' nicknames. "Grease" was keyboardist Taz DiGregorio. Charlie Daniels was just "Charlie"; sometimes, "the Fat Boy". It was released in 1972, courtesy of Kama Sutra Records.

== Track listing ==
Side one

No.	Title	Writer(s)	Length
1.	"Great Big Bunches of Love"	Daniels	3:42
2.	"I'll Try Again Tomorrow"	Daniels, Taz DiGregorio	5:19
3.	"Parchmont Farm"	Mose Allison	2:24
4.	"Tomorrow's Gonna Be Another Day"	Daniels	2:30
5.	"Black Autumn"	Daniels, Earl Grigsby	5:12

Side two

No.	Title	Writer(s)	Length
1.	"In The City"	Daniels	3:52
2.	"New York City, King Size Rosewood Bed"	Daniels	4:20
3.	"Evil"	Daniels	2:35
4.	"Billy Joe Young"	Daniels	3:21
5.	"Drinkin' Wine, Spo-Dee-O-Dee"	Stick McGhee, J. Mayo Williams	5:01

== Personnel ==
- Charlie Daniels - guitar, fiddle, mandolin, vocals
- Taz "Grease" DiGregorio - keyboards, vocals
- Earl "Te John" Grigsby - bass, vocals
- Jeff "Wolfman" Myer - drums, percussion

== Critical reception ==
Professional ratings
Review scores
Source	Rating
Allmusic	3.5/5 stars

Te John, Grease, & Wolfman received three and a half stars out of five from Michael B. Smith of Allmusic. Smith concludes that "Daniels rocks with the intensity of a downbound train on 'Great Big Bunches of Love,' and on his cover of the Jerry Lee Lewis chestnut 'Drinkin' Wine, Spo-Dee-O-Dee.' A true Southern poet, Charlie Daniels is seen here in the infancy of his artistic development, but even at this early stage, the poet is alive and well.".
