= Off the Grid: Doin' It Dylan =

Studio album by Charlie Daniels
- Released: April 1, 2014
- Genre: Country rock
- Length: 40:00
- Label: Blue Hat Records
- Producer: Charlie Daniels; Casey Wood

Charlie Daniels chronology
Hits of the South (2013)	Off the Grid: Doin' It Dylan (2014)	Night Hawk (2016)

Professional ratings
Review scores
Source	Rating
AllMusic	4/5 stars

Off the Grid: Doin' It Dylan is a tribute album to Bob Dylan, by the Charlie Daniels Band. The album of Dylan covers was released April 1, 2014. When Daniels first moved to Nashville, he played guitar on three of Bob Dylan's albums, which were recorded there. Daniels attributes playing on these albums for helping him learn about the music business and especially for showing him how to lead his own band. He noted that Dylan had a sense of freedom and that he let the musician play the way he wanted to, instead of telling him how to play.

== Critical reception ==
Stephen Thomas Erlewine of AllMusic writes that Daniels' "decision to cut an album devoted to Dylan is not out of the blue." as Daniels "played guitar and bass on the sessions that became Nashville Skyline, Self Portrait, and New Morning." Erlewine gives this album 4 out of a possible 5 stars.

In his review for Cover Me Songs, Joseph Wright says "In the end, each track on Off the Grid is less a Dylan tribute than a Daniels cover."

Sean Curnyn of Cinch Review writes, "It's the first time Daniels has recorded an album of Dylan covers, or as far as I know, any album dedicated to the songs of another writer."

Jim Moulton at No Depression writes, "Well, this is different for The Charlie Daniels Band. Some of the first sessions work on the guitar that Daniels did when he moved to Nashville was for Bob Dylan's Nashville Skyline Album. Charlie was just supposed to fill in for a day for a guitar player who did not show up. Unfortunately for the guitarist that did not show up, Dylan wanted Charlie to keep playing."

== Track listing ==
All tracks are written by Bob Dylan.

No.	Title	Original Dylan Version	Length
1.	"Tangled Up in Blue"	Blood on the Tracks (1975)	4:12
2.	"Times They Are A-Changin'"	The Times They Are a-Changin' (1964)	3:21
3.	"I'll Be Your Baby Tonight"	John Wesley Harding (1967)	3:23
4.	"Gotta Serve Somebody"	Slow Train Coming (1979)	5:28
5.	"I Shall Be Released"	The Bootleg Series Volumes 1–3 (Rare & Unreleased) 1961–1991 (1991)	4:30
6.	"Country Pie"	Nashville Skyline (1969)	2:18
7.	"Mr. Tambourine Man"	Bringing It All Back Home (1965)	4:28
8.	"A Hard Rain's a-Gonna Fall"	The Freewheelin' Bob Dylan (1963)	4:16
9.	"Just Like a Woman"	Blonde on Blonde (1966)	4:22
10.	"Quinn the Eskimo (The Mighty Quinn)"	The Basement Tapes (1967)	3:42
Total length:			40:00

- The Band recorded the first officially released version of "I Shall Be Released" for their 1968 debut album, Music from Big Pink. The Band had previously served as Dylan's backing band from 1965 to 1967 on his first U.S. "electric" tour.

== Musicians ==
- Charlie Daniels – Vocals. Fiddle, Acoustic Guitar, Mandolin
- Pat McDonald – Congas, Drums, Shaker, Tambourine
- Charlie Hayward – Acoustic Bass
- Bruce Brown – Banjo, Dobro, Acoustic Guitar, Harmonica, Mandolin, Background Vocals
- Chris Wormer – 12 String Guitar, Acoustic Guitar, Slide Guitar, Background Vocals
- Shannon Wickline – Piano
- Casey Wood – Harmonium

== Production ==
- Charlie Daniels – Producer
- Casey Wood – Producer, Engineer, Mixing
- Jim DeMain – Mastering
- Erick Anderson – Art Direction, Design, Photography
- Roger Campbell – Recording Assistant
- David Corlew – Compilation Producer
- Bob Dylan – Tributee
- BeBe Evans – Production Coordination
- Bob Frank – Consultant
- Wayne Halper – Business Affairs
- Larry Brother Love – Cover Model
- Paula Szeigis – Art Direction, Production Coordination
- Angela Gresham Wheeler – Art Direction, Production Coordination

Track information and credits adapted from the album's liner notes.

== See also ==
- List of songs written by Bob Dylan
- List of artists who have covered Bob Dylan songs
