= Joy to the World: A Bluegrass Christmas =

Studio album by Charlie Daniels
- Released: October 13, 2009
- Genre: Bluegrass
- Label: Koch
- Producer: Charlie Daniels; Tim Weeks; Casey Wood

Charlie Daniels chronology
Deuces (2007)	Joy to the World: A Bluegrass Christmas (2009)	Land That I Love (2010)

Professional ratings
Review scores
Source	Rating
Allmusic	3/5 stars

Joy to the World: A Bluegrass Christmas is an album by the Charlie Daniels Band. It was released on October 13, 2009. There is a deluxe edition that is a CD/DVD.

== Track listing ==
=== CD ===
1. "Christmas Time's A-Comin'" (with the Grascals)
2. "Christmas Time Down South" (with Aaron Tippin)
3. "Blue Christmas" (with Jewel)
4. "Mississippi Christmas Eve"
5. "Hallelujah"
6. "The Christmas Song" (with Dan Tyminski)
7. "O Come All Ye Faithful" (with Kathy Mattea)
8. "God Rest Ye Merry, Gentlemen" (with Evelyn Cox of the Cox Family)
9. "Joy to the World"
10. "the Christmas Story" from The Book of Luke (Luke 2:1-11)
11. "Silent Night" (with Suzanne Cox of the Cox Family)
12. "A Carolina Christmas Carol"

=== DVD ===
1. Chapter 1: "Mississippi Christmas Eve"
2. Chapter 2: "Hallelujah"
3. Chapter 3: "Christmas Time's A Comin'" (with the Grascals)
4. Chapter 4: "Blue Christmas" (with Suzanne Cox on the DVD)
5. Chapter 5: "Silent Night" (with Suzanne Cox)
6. Chapter 6: "God Rest Ye Merry, Gentlemen" (with Evelyn Cox)
7. Chapter 7: "The Christmas Song" (with Dan Tyminski)
8. Chapter 8: "Christmas Time Down South" (with Aaron Tippin)
9. Chapter 9: "O Come All Ye Faithful" (with Kathy Mattea)
10. Chapter 10: "Joy to the World" (with all artists)

== Personnel ==
- Charlie Daniels - Arranger, composer, fiddle, acoustic guitar, producer, readings, lead & background vocals
- Charlie Hayward - Bass
- Jeremy Abshire - Fiddle
- Kristin Scott Benson - Banjo
- Bruce Ray Brown - Dobro, 12 string acoustic guitar, background vocals
- Carolyn Corlew - Background vocals
- Evelyn & Suzanne Cox - vocals & background vocals
- Terry Eldridge - Acoustic guitar, vocals
- Aubrey Haynie - Fiddle, mandolin
- Kevin Haynie - Banjo
- Jewel - Vocals
- Pat MacDonald - Cabasa, drums, shaker, tambourine
- Kathy Mattea - Vocals
- Danny Roberts - Mandolin
- Terry Allan Smith - Bass, background vocals
- Aaron Tippin - Vocals
- Dan Tyminski - Vocals
- Chris Wormer - Acoustic guitar

== Chart performance ==
Joy to the World: A Bluegrass Christmas peaked at #8 on the U.S. "Billboard" Top Bluegrass Albums chart in 2009 and #39 on the U.S. "Billboard" Top Holiday Albums chart in 2010.

Chart (2009)	Peak position
U.S. Billboard Top Bluegrass Albums	8

Chart (2010)	Peak position
U.S. "Billboard" Top Holiday Albums	39

== Review ==
Joy to the World: A Bluegrass Christmas received three and a half out of five stars from AllMusic with Stephen Thomas Erlewine's concluding in his review that "Charlie Daniels brings in a few friends for the rollicking Joy to the World: A Bluegrass Christmas. This pretty much relies on holiday standards, both secular and Christian, but they're not performed lazily: the Charlie Daniels Band plays these songs with no small amount of joy, making this a small season delight."
