= 16 Biggest Hits, Volume II =

Greatest hits album by Willie Nelson
- Released: August 7, 2007
- Genre: Country
- Label: Legacy
- Producers: Chet Atkins, Willie Nelson, Brian Ahern, Chips Moman, Booker T. Jones

Willie Nelson chronology
Natural Renegade: Opus Collection (2007)	16 Biggest Hits, Volume II (2007)	One Hell of a Ride (2008)

16 Biggest Hits, Volume II is a 2007 compilation album by country singer Willie Nelson released on Columbia Records/ Legacy.

== Track listing ==
No.	Title	Length
1.	"All of Me"	3:56
2.	"Me and Paul"	3:50
3.	"I'd Have to Be Crazy"	3:27
4.	"Faded Love"	3:51
5.	"Heartbreak Hotel"	3:02
6.	"Highwayman"	3:04
7.	"Mona Lisa"	2:33
8.	"There You Are"	3:04
9.	"Good Hearted Woman"	2:58
10.	"Something to Brag About"	2:05
11.	"Sweet Memories"	3:14
12.	"Let It Be Me"	3:32
13.	"Pancho and Lefty"	4:47
14.	"Help Me Make It Through the Night"	4:02
15.	"I Love You a Thousand Ways"	3:01
16.	"Without a Song"	3:51

== Personnel ==
- Willie Nelson – Guitar, vocals
