= Me and the Boys (album) =

Studio album by The Charlie Daniels Band
- Released: October 1985
- Length: 40:13
- Label: Epic
- Producer: John Boylan

The Charlie Daniels Band chronology
Windows (1982)	Me and the Boys (1985)	Powder Keg (1987)

Professional ratings
Review scores
Source	Rating
Allmusic	2/5 stars

Me and the Boys is the thirteenth studio album by Charlie Daniels and the tenth as the Charlie Daniels Band released in 1985.

The album contains three cover songs. "Me and the Boys" was previously released earlier in 1985 as a Canadian single by the songwriter, Matt Minglewood, for his subsequent album of the same name. "Still Hurtin' Me" is a cover of Brian Cadd's June 1985 Australian single of the same name from his album, No Stone Unturned. "Talking to the Moon" is a cover of Don Henley's song from his 1982 album, I Can't Stand Still.

== Track listing ==
1. "Me and the Boys" (Matt Minglewood) - 4:45
2. "Still Hurtin' Me" (Brian Cadd) - 4:10
3. "Talking to the Moon" (Don Henley, JD Souther) - 4:43
4. "Class of '63" - (Charlie Daniels, Tom Crain) - 4:14
5. "American Farmer" (Daniels, Crain, Taz DiGregorio, Fred Edwards, Charlie Hayward) - 3:33
6. "M.I.A" (Daniels, Crain, DiGregorio, Edwards, Hayward) - 4:31
7. "American Rock and Roll" (Daniels, Crain, DiGregorio, Edwards, Hayward) - 3:27
8. "Ever Changing Lady" (DiGregorio, Larry B. Abernathy) - 3:43
9. "Louisiana Fai Dodo" (Daniels, Crain, DiGregorio, Edwards, Hayward) - 3:22
10. "Drinkin' My Baby Goodbye" (Daniels) - 3:41

== Charts ==
Chart (1985)	Peak position
US Top Country Albums (Billboard)	27
