= America, I Believe in You =

Studio album by Charlie Daniels
- Released: April 12, 1993
- Recorded: 1992
- Studio: Sound Stage Studios, Nashville, TN
- Length: 43:27
- Label: Liberty
- Producer: Jimmy Bowen

Charlie Daniels chronology
Renegade (1991)	America, I Believe in You (1993)	The Door (1994)

Professional ratings
Review scores
Source	Rating
AllMusic	2/5 stars

America, I Believe in You is an album released by Charlie Daniels on April 12, 1993.

== Track listing ==
- All songs composed by Charlie Daniels, Taz DiGregorio, Charlie Hayward, Jack Gavin, Bruce Ray Brown.
1. "All Night Long" - 3:31
2. "Troubles of My Own" - 3:55
3. "Tennessee Two Step" - 4:50
4. "The Girl Next Door" - 3:47
5. "America, I Believe in You" - 5:16
6. "Oh Juanita" - 4:19
7. "Sweet Little Country Girl" - 3:28
8. "Alley Cat" - 3:37
9. "What You Gonna Do About Me" - 3:26
10. "San Miguel" - 6:45

== Personnel ==
- Charlie Daniels – guitar, vocals, liner notes
- Taz DiGregorio – keyboards
- Charlie Hayward – bass
- Jack Gavin – percussion, drums
- Bruce Ray Brown – guitar, vocals, backing vocals
- Carolyn Corlew – vocals, backing vocals
- Jimmy Bowen – producer
- David Corlew – executive producer
- Jerry Joyner – design
- Ron Keith – photography
- John Kelton – engineer, mixing
- Russ Martin – mixing assistant
- Glenn Meadows – digital editing, mastering
- Paula Montondo – assistant engineer, mixing assistant
- Virginia Team – art direction

Track information and credits adapted from the album's liner notes.

== Chart performance ==
=== Album ===
Chart (1993)	Peak position
US Top Country Albums (Billboard)	75

=== Singles ===
Title	Date	Chart	Peak position
"America, I Believe in You"	July 18, 1993	US Hot Country Songs (Billboard)	73
