= Smokin' Armadillos =

- Also known as: The Armadillos (1992)
- Origin: Bakersfield, California, United States
- Genres: Country
- Years active: 1992–2023
- Labels: Gramac, MCG/Curb, Housekeeping
- Past members: Aaron Casida; Josh Graham; Darrin Kirkindoll; Scott Meeks; Rick Russell; Jason Theiste

Smokin' Armadillos (originally known as The Armadillos) were an American country music group formed in Bakersfield, California in 1992. Its members were Rick Russell (lead vocals), Josh Graham (guitar, vocals), Scott Meeks (guitar, vocals), Jason Theiste (fiddle, mandolin), Aaron Casida (bass guitar, vocals), and Darrin Kirkindoll (drums).

== History ==
Smokin' Armadillos was founded in 1992 by guitarist Josh Graham, who created a country rap song called "I'm a Cowboy" which he performed at various talent shows before recruiting the rest of the band members. The band recorded a five-song EP called Out of the Burrow in 1995 and after selling more than 150,000 copies of this disc, they signed to Curb Records in 1995. At the time of signing, the band's members ranged in age from 18 to 26.

The group recorded one album for Curb in 1996, which included the chart singles "Let Your Heart Lead Your Mind" and "Thump Factor". A third single, "I Don't Want No Part of It", did not appear on an album. Chuck Howard produced their debut album, and encouraged the band to record some of their own material, including "Let Your Heart Lead Your Mind", which Meeks wrote. The album received mixed-to-positive reviews from Country Standard Time and Allmusic, both of whom praised the musicianship.

In 2005 after 13 years together, the Armadillos went on hiatus, playing their last show together on March 25 at Rabobank Theater in Bakersfield, CA. They reconvened in 2017, releasing "The Other California" in September of that year.

Lead singer Rick Russell died on September 22, 2023 from heart complications. Josh Graham stated that due to the lead singer's death, the band had no plans to continue without him.

== Discography ==
=== Albums ===
Title	Album details	Peak chart positions	
Title	Album details	US Country	US Heat
Out of the Burrow (EP)	Release date: 1993; Label: Gramac	—	—
Smokin' Armadillos	Release date: March 12, 1996; Label: MCG/Curb Records	37	24
Strike the Match	Release date: August 19, 2003; Label: Housekeeping	—	—
"—" denotes releases that did not chart

=== Singles ===
Year	Single	Peak chart positions		Album
Year	Single	US Country	CAN Country	Album
1993	"My Girlfriend Might"	—	—	Out of the Burrow
1993	"I'm a Cowboy"	—	—	Out of the Burrow
1993	"Red Rock"	—	—	Out of the Burrow
1996	"Let Your Heart Lead Your Mind"	53	—	Smokin' Armadillos
1996	"Thump Factor"	68	—	Smokin' Armadillos
1996	"Miracle Man"	—	—	Smokin' Armadillos
1998	"I Don't Want No Part of It"	64	90	Plan B
1998	"Waking Up Behind the Wheel"	—	—	Plan B
2003	"You Were a Mountain"	—	—	Strike the Match
2017	"The Other California"	—	—	—N/a
"—" denotes releases that did not chart

=== Music videos ===
Year	Video
1993	"Red Rock"
1996	"Let Your Heart Lead Your Mind"
