= Powder keg of Europe =

Metaphor for the political state of the Balkans in the early 20th century

A diagrammatic illustration of European political alliances just before World War I.

The powder keg of Europe or Balkan powder keg was the Balkans in the early part of the 20th century preceding World War I. There were many overlapping claims to territories and spheres of influence between the major European powers such as Russia, Austria-Hungary, Germany and, to a lesser degree, the Ottoman Empire, the United Kingdom and Italy.

In addition to the imperialistic ambitions and interests in this region, there was a growth in nationalism with the indigenous peoples of this region leading to the formation of the independent states of Greece, Serbia, Montenegro, Bulgaria, Romania and Albania.

These tensions had boiled over during the decades long diplomatic crisis in the Balkans: starting with the Macedonian Struggle, the Balkan Wars, and then the 1914 Greco-Turkish war scare, though the Great Powers ruled out military intervention with the region until the assassination of Franz Ferdinand.

== Irredentism in the Balkans and the Great Powers ==
Within these nations, there were movements to create "greater" nations, which is to enlarge the boundaries of the state beyond those areas where the national ethnic group was in the majority (irredentism). This led to conflict between the newly independent nations and the empire from which they split, the Ottoman Empire. Additionally, it led to differences between the Balkan nations who wished to gain territory at the expense of their neighbors. Both the conflict with the Ottoman Empire and between the Balkan nations led to the Balkan Wars in 1912–13.

In a different vein, the ideology of Pan-Slavism in Balkans gained popularity; the movement built around it in the region sought to unite all of the Slavs of the Balkans into one nation, Yugoslavia. This, however, would require the union of several Balkan states and territory which was part of Austria-Hungary. For this reason, Pan-Slavism was strongly opposed by Austria-Hungary, while it was supported by Russia which viewed itself as leader of all Slavic nations.

To complicate matters, in the years preceding World War I, there existed a tangle of Great Power alliances, both formal and informal, public and secret. Following the Napoleonic Wars there had existed a "balance of power" to, in theory, prevent major wars. This theory held that opposing combinations of powers in Europe would be evenly matched entailing that any general war would be far too costly for any nation to risk entering. This system began to fall apart as the Ottoman Empire which had been seen as a check on Russian power began to crumble, and as Germany, which had been a loose confederation of minor states, was united into a major power. Not only did these changes lead to a realignment of power, but of interests as well.

All these factors, and many others, conspired to bring about the First World War. As is insinuated by the name "the powder keg of Europe," the Balkans were not the major issue at stake in the war, but were merely the catalyst that led to the conflagration. The Chancellor of Germany in the late 19th century, Otto von Bismarck, correctly predicted it would be the source of major conflict in Europe.

The powder keg "exploded" causing the First World War, which began with a conflict between imperial Austria-Hungary and Pan-Slavic Serbia. Archduke Franz Ferdinand of Austria, a member of the Austrian imperial family, was assassinated by a Bosnian of Serb extraction, a member of the Young Bosnia movement. Austria-Hungary then issued an ultimatum to Serbia intended to provoke it to war through extreme demands. The Serbian government reservedly accepted all of the conditions of the ultimatum, except for condition number six which demanded the inclusion of Austria-Hungary in Serbia's judicial inquiry into the assassination.

Serbia indicated this would be unconstitutional and a violation of its sovereignty and Austria-Hungary used it as a casus belli to invade Serbia. With Germany fully supporting them, the Austro-Hungarians partially mobilized their army against Serbia, which had already begun mobilizing before replying to the Austro-Hungarian July Ultimatum. Russia then began mobilizing in support of Serbia, though not bound by treaty to do so. Due to the system of European alliances, this led to a series of escalating Austrian and Russian mobilizations and eventually Britain and France were also obliged to mobilize and declare war.

== See also ==
- Causes of World War I
- The Guns of August, a nonfiction work detailing the leadup to World War I
