= This Ain't No Rag, It's a Flag =

Single by Charlie Daniels

from the album Live!
- Released: November 5, 2001
- Recorded: October 18, 2001
- Length: 3:30
- Label: Audium
- Songwriter: Charlie Daniels
- Producers: Charlie Daniels; Patrick Kelly

Charlie Daniels singles chronology
"Road Dogs" (2000)	"This Ain't No Rag, It's a Flag" (2001)	"Southern Boy" (2003)

"This Ain't No Rag, It's a Flag" is a song by American music group Charlie Daniels Band and released as a bonus track on their 2001 album Live!. The song was written solely by Daniels and was released in November 2001 as the first and only single from the live album. This song was written in response to the September 11 attacks. Its peak position was number 33 on the US Country charts. The song is his highest-charted single since 1989's "Simple Man".

== Background and writing ==
The song first gained attention when CMT refused to allow Daniels to perform it on October 21 during the Country Freedom Concert that was staged in Nashville. The event was to raise funds for the Salvation Army's disaster relief efforts in New York City. Daniels refused to go on the show in protest saying that "if my song would be offensive, then my presence would be offensive." Daniels told Phyllis Stark of Billboard Magazine that the events of September 11 "hit me really hard. It really floored me. I couldn't get away from it. I wept a lot." Daniels said that people kept sending him emails asking if he was going to write a song about the attacks.

== Critical reception ==
Deborah Evans Price of Billboard magazine reviewed the song favorably calling it "far more rousing than racist, this well-performed rocker is all about nationalism and our intention to kick some terrorist butt." She also states that there is "no doubt the more dovish among us will take offense, but when juxtaposed against rescue efforts that have evolved into recovery, who cares?

== Chart performance ==
"This Ain't No Rag, It's a Flag" debuted at number 51 on the U.S. Billboard Hot Country Singles & Tracks for the week of November 10, 2001.

Chart (2001)	Peak position
US Hot Country Songs (Billboard)	33
