= Boogie Woogie Fiddle Country Blues =

Single by Charlie Daniels Band

from the album Homesick Heroes
- B-side: "Working Man You Got It All"
- Released: August 20, 1988
- Length: 3:26
- Label: Epic
- Songwriter(s): Charlie Daniels; Taz DiGregorio; Tom Crain; Charlie Hayward; Jack Gavin
- Producer(s): James Stroud

Charlie Daniels Band singles chronology
"Powder Keg" (1987)	"Boogie Woogie Fiddle Country Blues" (1988)	"Uneasy Rider '88" (1988)

"Boogie Woogie Fiddle Country Blues" is a song written and recorded by American music group Charlie Daniels Band. It was released in August 1988 as the first single from the album Homesick Heroes. The song reached number 10 on the Billboard Hot Country Singles & Tracks chart.

== Chart performance ==
Chart (1988)	Peak position
US Hot Country Songs (Billboard)	10
Canadian RPM Country Tracks	10
