= The Legend of Wooley Swamp =

1980 single by Charlie Daniels

Single by Charlie Daniels

from the album Full Moon
- B-side: "Money"
- Released: August 11, 1980
- Genre: Country
- Length: 4:18
- Label: Epic
- Songwriters: Charlie Daniels; Tom Crain; Joel DiGregorio; Fred Edwards; James W. Marshall; Charles Hayward
- Producer: John Boylan

Charlie Daniels singles chronology
"In America" (1980)	"The Legend of Wooley Swamp" (1980)	"Carolina (I Remember You)" (1980)

"The Legend of Wooley Swamp" is a song written, composed, and recorded by the Charlie Daniels Band. It was released in August 1980 as the second single from the album Full Moon, which was later certified platinum.

Daniels was inspired to write another song similar to his 1979 hit "The Devil Went Down To Georgia". While searching for ideas, Daniels remembered Woolie Swamp, an actual place in Bladen County, North Carolina where he used to night hunt as a youngster. Recalling how swamps can take on a whole different personality at night, Daniels mused that Woolie Swamp "just seemed like the kind of place a story like that could happen".

== Content ==
The song tells of a man who, after hearing a fable about a ghost in a place called Wooley Swamp, stubbornly decides to confirm the story on his own, only to come away with the knowledge that, "there's some things in this world you just can't explain"; these words are repeated in the chorus between the two verses and then spoken at the very end of the song.

The first verse tells of Lucius Clay, who lived in Wooley Swamp, a darkened quagmire hidden “way back in Booger Woods”. Clay was an elderly recluse and a miser who cared only about his money that he kept sealed in Mason jars and buried in various spots around the shack where he lived. Clay did little more than dig up the jars "on certain nights if the moon is right" and pour all of the money out on the floor of his shack just to run his fingers through it.

The second and longer verse introduces the Cable boys, three sinister white trash brothers who live in nearby Carver's Creek. One night, the eldest brother decides that they are going to kill Lucius Clay and steal his money. The three meet later in Wooley Swamp, sneak up to the shack, and find Clay with a shovel and "thirteen rusty Mason jars" he had just dug up. The three young men beat Clay unconscious then kill him by throwing him in the swamp, laughing as they watch his body sink into the mire. They grab his money from the shack and try to escape only to become trapped in quicksand. The brothers scream for help and futilely struggle to free themselves, and right before they meet their own deathly karma, they hear Clay "laughin' in a voice as loud as thunder".

The final stanza of the second verse closes the story, saying that even though the myth is fifty years old (as of 1980), if you go by the shack on certain moonlit nights, "you can hear three young men screamin', an' you can hear one old man laugh", and a patch of ground is perpetually wet.

== Success and reception ==
Although the song stalled at number 80 on the Billboard country charts, it was more successful on the U.S. pop charts as it peaked at number 31 in the fall of that year. Billboard Magazine said that the song is a "rousing country /rock saga" which "builds up pressure with bold use of drums and guitar" and whose lyrics present an "irresistible, folklore tale." It receives occasional airplay to this day, and has become one of Daniels' signature songs.

Chart (1980)	Peak position
U.S. Billboard Hot Country Singles	80
U.S. Billboard Hot 100	31
Canadian RPM Country Tracks	57

== Lyrical references ==
The lyrics mention Carvers Creek, a small community in Bladen County, North Carolina. The community is just down the road from the Wooley Swamp, which is located near Elizabethtown, North Carolina. While the places are real, Daniels said the story and the character of Lucius Clay were his own creation.

== Other versions ==
Daniels re-recorded the song with the group Smokin' Armadillos on their 1996 self-titled album.
