= Uneasy Rider =

1973 song by Charlie Daniels

Single by Charlie Daniels

from the album Honey in the Rock
- B-side: "Funky Junky"
- Released: June 1973
- Genre: Talking blues; talking bluegrass
- Length: 5:18
- Label: Kama Sutra 576 (U.S. 7" single)
- Songwriter: Charlie Daniels
- Producer: Charlie Daniels

Charlie Daniels singles chronology
"Great Big Bunches of Love" (1972)	"Uneasy Rider" (1973)	"Whiskey" (1974)

"Uneasy Rider" is a 1973 song written and performed by American singer and multi-instrumentalist Charlie Daniels. (Note: Later releases from Charlie Daniels are credited to "the Charlie Daniels Band" including compilations featuring "Uneasy Rider" but the single and the album were originally credited to "Charlie Daniels".) It consists of a narrative spoken over a guitar melody, and is sometimes considered a novelty song. It was released as a single and appeared on Daniels' album Honey in the Rock which is also sometimes known as Uneasy Rider.

== Plot ==
The narrator protagonist of "Uneasy Rider" is a long-haired marijuana smoker driving a Chevrolet with a "peace sign, mag wheels, and four on the floor." The song is a spoken-word description of an interlude in a trip from a non-specified location in the Southern United States to Los Angeles, California. When one of the narrator's tires goes flat in Jackson, Mississippi, he stops at a "Redneck" bar and calls a gas station to come repair it. He is alone at first, to his relief, but several local residents soon arrive and question his manners, physical appearance, and choice of vehicle. In order to extricate himself from a potential physical altercation, the narrator accuses one man of being a federal agent working undercover to infiltrate the Ku Klux Klan, who removes George Wallace bumper stickers, voted for George McGovern, and has a Communist flag on his garage wall. As the others begin to believe the narrator's story, the man defends himself by saying he has lived in Jackson all of his life, has no garage, is a faithful Baptist, and adheres to the teachings of "Brother John Birch". The distraction lasts long enough for the narrator to escape just as his tire is repaired. After chasing the rednecks around with his car for a short time, he speeds away quickly and resumes his journey to Los Angeles; already on a northward track to Arkansas, he decides on the fly to reroute through Omaha, Nebraska.

== Cultural references ==
The lyrics reflect the cultural divisions in the Southern United States in the early 1970s between the counterculture of the 1960s and more traditional Southern culture. Unlike most country music of the time, Daniels' protagonist is a member of the counterculture.

The song's title, which does not appear in the lyrics, is a play on the title of the 1969 film Easy Rider, which follows two counterculture motorcyclists on a journey in the opposite direction, from Los Angeles to New Orleans, Louisiana, culminating in the sudden, violent deaths of the two bikers at the hands of two shotgun-wielding Southerners.

Daniels' counterculture attitude was consistent with that of others in the outlaw country music movement but is in contrast to his later attitudes expressed in songs such as 1989's "Simple Man".

== Chart performance ==
Chart (1973)	Peak position
U.S. Billboard Hot Country Singles & Tracks	67
U.S. Billboard Hot 100	9
Canadian RPM Country Tracks	69
Canadian RPM Top Singles	18

== Uneasy Rider '88 ==
"Uneasy Rider '88"

Single by The Charlie Daniels Band

from the album Homesick Heroes
- Released: November 1988
- Recorded: May 4, 1988
- Length: 4:26
- Label: Epic
- Songwriters: Charlie Daniels; Tom Crain; Taz DiGregorio; Charlie Hayward; Jack Gavin
- Producer: James Stroud

The Charlie Daniels Band's 1988 album Homesick Heroes featured the single "Uneasy Rider '88" that was musically and thematically similar to "Uneasy Rider" but with a story set in a gay bar in Houston, Texas.

=== Content ===
Two Southern men decide to travel to New Orleans to party, but on the way get pulled over by a police officer for speeding. They decide to stop at the Cloud 9 Bar and Grill in Houston, Texas. The narrator reacts violently to sexual harassment from a cross-dressing customer, which instigates a fight with the locals.

His friend joins in, and learns during the fight that the good-looking gal he had been dancing with was also a crossdresser, much to his disgust. The narrator and his friend struggle to leave the bar amid the fight, get into their vehicle, and speed away—and get pulled over by the same police officer who stopped them earlier. They end up in a county jail where the narrator swears off drinking and partying, and resolving to go "back where the women are women and the men are men."
