= Still in Saigon =

Single by Charlie Daniels

from the album Windows
- B-side: "Blowing Along with the Wind"
- Released: March 15, 1982
- Length: 3:50
- Label: Epic
- Songwriter: Dan Daley
- Producer: John Boylan

Charlie Daniels singles chronology
"Sweet Home Alabama" (1981)	"Still in Saigon" (1982)	"Ragin' Cajun" (1982)

"Still in Saigon", is a song written by Dan Daley and performed by the Charlie Daniels Band and released on their 1982 album Windows. It was written by Daley in May 1981.

== Background ==
The song is a portrayal of the plight of the American Vietnam veteran a decade after the war; it was part of an early 1980s wave of attention to the subject, presaging treatments such as Bruce Springsteen's "Born in the U.S.A." and "Shut Out the Light", Billy Joel's "Goodnight Saigon", Huey Lewis and the News' "Walking on a Thin Line", Paul Hardcastle's "19" and somewhat later Steve Earle's "Copperhead Road".

The song has been noted for its early and sympathetic portrayal of a Vietnam War veteran experiencing post-traumatic stress disorder (PTSD). At the time of its release in 1982, such depictions were relatively uncommon in popular music. The song initially offered to Springsteen and other artists before being recorded by Daniels, who had rarely recorded songs he did not write or co-write. The recording became one of Daniels' most commercially successful releases and has been regarded as one of his most culturally significant works.

== Content ==
The story is told ten years after the protagonist faced being drafted into the Vietnam War. Though he could have avoided being sent (either by escaping to Canada as a war protester, or choosing to stay in school under a student deferment), believing he was "brought up differently/I couldn't break the rules" elected to go ahead and serve.

He remained in Vietnam for "thirteen months and fifteen days", with the latter portion ("the last ones were the worst") taking an emotional toll on Daniels ("one minute I'd kneel down and pray/The next I'd stand and curse"). The emotional problems only worsened upon his return, as he came home to a bitterly divided family – his war-protesting younger brother labels him a "killer" while his father calls him a "vet". Moreover, he began to exhibit signs of post-traumatic stress disorder (PTSD) resulting from his service (constantly looking behind doors for the enemy, and exhibiting flashbacks during the rainy summer season); symptoms which ten years later continue to plague him.

== Charts ==
Although the song did not chart on the country charts, it did reach No. 2 on the Billboard Mainstream Rock chart.

Chart (1982)	Peak position
U.S. Billboard Hot 100	22
U.S. Top Rock Tracks	2
