= Drinkin' My Baby Goodbye =

Single by Charlie Daniels

from the album Me and the Boys
- B-side: "Ever Changing Lady"
- Released: March 10, 1986
- Length: 3:41
- Label: Epic
- Songwriter(s): Charlie Daniels
- Producer(s): John Boylan

Charlie Daniels singles chronology
"Still Hurtin' Me" (1985)	"Drinkin' My Baby Goodbye" (1986)	"Bogged Down in Love with You" (1987)

"Drinkin' My Baby Goodbye" is a song by American music group Charlie Daniels Band. The song was written solely by Daniels and was released in March 1986 as the third and final single from their album Me and the Boys. The song reached number 8 on the Billboard Hot Country Singles & Tracks chart.

== Chart performance ==
Chart (1986)	Peak position
US Hot Country Songs (Billboard)	8
Canadian RPM Country Tracks	21
