= In America (song) =

Single by Charlie Daniels

from the album Full Moon
- B-side: "Blue Star"
- Released: May 24, 1980
- Genre: Southern rock; country rock
- Length: 3:21
- Label: Epic
- Songwriters: Charlie Daniels; Tom Crain; "Taz" DiGregorio; Fred Edwards; James W Marshall; Charles Hayward
- Producer: John Boylan

Charlie Daniels singles chronology
"Long Haired Country Boy" (1980)	"In America" (1980)	"The Legend of Wooley Swamp" (1980)

Music video
- "In America" on YouTube

"In America" is a song written and recorded by American music group Charlie Daniels Band. It was released in May 1980 as the lead single from their album Full Moon. A live music video was released in 2001 shortly after the September 11 attacks.

== Content ==
The song was a reaction to the varying difficult issues facing America in the late 1970s – the fallout from the Watergate scandal, the simultaneous double-digit inflation, unemployment, and prime interest rates (leading to the misery index), and the 1979–1981 Iran Hostage Crisis.

Notwithstanding all the problems America was facing, the song described a patriotic, united America which would overcome the obstacles and return to its greatness ("we'll all stick together and you can take that to the bank / That's the cowboys and the hippies and the rebels and the yanks"). At one point, it quotes the title of Bobby Bare's "God Bless America Again," a song that asks for God's blessing over a struggling United States.

The song experienced a revival following the September 11 attacks, when it was floated around the Internet as "F*** Bin Laden."

== Background and writing ==
The line, "Just go and lay your hand on a Pittsburgh Steelers fan" stems from Daniels' feeling that the people in Pittsburgh are "The salt of the earth, the finest, just the greatest people. The strength of America." He says, "I've gone to ball games at different places, but I've always felt the Pittsburgh Steelers fans, especially in the old stadium - I mean, they're steel workers and they're good old guys with blisters, or calluses on their hands. The strength of America is not in Washington, D.C., It's in our people, it's on the farms, in the factories. It's the people out here that make this country work. The truck drivers, the farmers. And these people, that's what they were, and I just felt like if you want to go to war, let me take some of these guys with me. Go lay your hand on a Pittsburgh Steelers fan, and you're gonna find out what American anger is, because it's the kind of people they are." Also at the time of the song's release, the Pittsburgh Steelers were Super Bowl XIV Champions.

== Chart performance ==
Chart (1980)	Peak position
US Hot Country Songs (Billboard)	13
US Billboard Hot 100	11
Canadian RPM Country Tracks	62

Year-end chart (1980)	Rank
US Top Pop Singles (Billboard)	96
