= Long Haired Country Boy =

Single by Charlie Daniels Band

from the album Fire on the Mountain
- B-side: "Sweet Louisiana"
- Released: April 1975 (original); January 1980 (re-release)
- Genre: Country rock; Southern rock
- Length: 4:03
- Label: Sony
- Songwriter: Charlie Daniels
- Producer: Paul Hornsby

Charlie Daniels Band singles chronology
"The South's Gonna Do It" (1975)	"Long Haired Country Boy" (1975)	"Damn Good Cowboy" (1975)

"Long Haired Country Boy" is a song by American music group Charlie Daniels Band and released on their 1974 album Fire on the Mountain. It was first released as a single in April, 1975 and was re-released as a single in January, 1980. In 2019, it was covered by Cody Johnson on his album, Ain't Nothin' to It. The song was written solely by Charlie Daniels.

Cash Box said "fine lyrics and musicianship adds up to another potential smash."

== Chart performance ==
Chart (1975)	Peak position
US Billboard Hot 100	56
Canadian Singles Chart	100

Chart (1980)	Peak position
U.S. Billboard Hot Country Singles & Tracks	27
Canadian RPM Country Tracks	16
