= The South's Gonna Do It =

"The South's Gonna Do It (Again)"

Single by Charlie Daniels Band

from the album Fire on the Mountain
- B-side: "New York City, King Size Rosewood Bed"
- Released: November 1974
- Genre: Country rock; southern rock
- Length: 4:00
- Label: Sony
- Songwriter: Charlie Daniels
- Producer: Paul Hornsby

Charlie Daniels Band singles chronology
"Land of Opportunity" (1974)	"The South's Gonna Do It (Again)" (1974)	"Long Haired Country Boy" (1975)

"The South's Gonna Do It (Again)" is a song written and performed by the Charlie Daniels Band and released on their 1974 album Fire on the Mountain.

== Content ==
The lyrics refer to several Southern rock bands and musicians:

- Grinderswitch
- The Marshall Tucker Band
- Lynyrd Skynyrd
- Dickey Betts (guitarist with The Allman Brothers)
- Elvin Bishop
- ZZ Top
- Wet Willie
- Barefoot Jerry
- Charlie Daniels Band

The first line in the song is also a play on Grinder's Switch, Tennessee, the fictional hometown of Grand Ole Opry star Minnie Pearl.

The song uses a play on words to promote Southern rock music. The notion that "the South shall rise again" was a familiar sentiment and rallying cry for disaffected Southern whites after the American Civil War. The song co-opts that sentiment, but uses the statement to celebrate Southern rock acts contemporary to the song itself. The "it" that the South is going to do again, it is implied, is to produce additional popular rock groups.

Daniels bristled at more nefarious interpretations of what the "it" was. When the Ku Klux Klan used the song as background music for radio commercials for a 1975 rally in Louisiana, Daniels told Billboard, "I'm damn proud of the South, but I sure as hell am not proud of the Ku Klux Klan. I wrote the song about the land I love and my brothers. It was not written to promote hate groups."

== Chart performance ==
Chart (1975)	Peak position
U.S. Billboard Hot 100	29
Canadian Singles Chart	68
