= Simple Man (Charlie Daniels song) =

Single by Charlie Daniels

from the album Simple Man
- B-side: "Ill Wind"
- Released: August 1989
- Length: 3:24
- Label: Epic
- Songwriters: Charlie Daniels, Taz DiGregorio, Jack Gavin, Charles Hayward
- Producer: James Stroud

Charlie Daniels singles chronology
"Midnight Train" (1989)	"Simple Man" (1989)	"Mister DJ" (1990)

"Simple Man", is a song written and recorded by American music group Charlie Daniels Band . It was released in August 1989 as the lead single from their album of the same name.

== Content ==
The song is the lament of a self-proclaimed honest man, who expresses frustration at barely getting by despite making an honest living, while dishonest politicians and criminals are allowed to get away with anything. Expressing frustration at a judicial system that he believes is too lenient with drug dealers, rapists and child abusers, ("Now if I had my way with people sellin' dope/I'd take a big tall tree and a short piece of rope/I'd hang 'em up high and let 'em swing 'til the sun goes down") and allowing swamp animals such as alligators to eat criminals ("Just take them rascals out in the swamp/Put 'em on their knees and tie 'em to a stump/Let the rattlers and the bugs and the alligators do the rest"). The man blames a society that has forsaken God and as a result has become a lawless society, then reaffirms his support of the death penalty for the most severe crimes ("The Good Book says it so I know it's the truth/An eye for an eye and a tooth for a tooth").

== Music video ==
The music video was directed by Larry Boothby and premiered in late 1989.

== Chart performance ==
Chart (1989–1990)	Peak position
Canada Country Singles (RPM)	15
US Hot Country Songs (Billboard)	12
