= Joel DiGregorio =

Musical artist (1944–2011)

Taz DiGregorio
- Born: William Joel DiGregorio; January 8, 1944; Southbridge, Massachusetts, U.S.
- Died: October 12, 2011 (aged 67) Cheatham County, Tennessee, U.S.
- Occupations: Musician, songwriter
- Instrument: Keyboards
- Years active: 1960–2011
- Formerly of: Charlie Daniels Band

William Joel "Taz" DiGregorio (January 8, 1944 – October 12, 2011) was a longtime member and keyboardist for the Charlie Daniels Band. He was born and lived in Southbridge, Massachusetts, until 1962 when he went on the road. He was self-taught on the keyboards, practicing from tunes by Elvis Presley, Fats Domino, and Little Richard following his attendance at a Ray Charles concert.

== Musical career ==
He learned the Fats Domino song "Blue Monday" at the age of sixteen. Once, he just started playing and singing the entire song and his sister asked him "How did you do that?" and he replied "I don't know" and that kickstarted his career. He once played with a band at The Golden Nugget in Worcester, Massachusetts and played with Fay Adams & The Drifters.

He fulfilled his goal of becoming a professional musician, initiating his career with his first band, the group Paul Chaplain and his Emeralds, best known for their minor hit "Shortnin' Bread" (1960). They sold about 250,000 copies of their album in 1959. He was on the album at the age of seventeen and he didn't know a lot about life and music, but he knew 8 chords and he recorded the song, Shortnin' Bread, and it became a hit.

By the early 1960s, the group disbanded, leaving DiGregorio to find other gigs which included playing in a lounge band in Florida under the name of Little Joe and the Romans with Bill B. on guitar, Bobby J. on drums, and Ben on bass. They also played at Benny's Rebel Room in Washington, DC and various lounges and clubs in Lexington, Kentucky, Dayton, Ohio and Syracuse, New York. In Lexington, Charlie sat in at the Southland Bowl lounge and, even then was well liked by the audience. It was rumored back then that Joel stuck popsicle sticks into broken organ keys to make the broken keys playable in his earlier years. This was observed by band members while playing at Benny's Rebel Room in 1965.

In 1964, he was working with a band that played different types of music. He sang and played bass pedals on the organ. There was a saxophone player in the band named Jerry Kaskie, who was then drafted into the military. Then, they hired a guitarist, who was also drafted. Taz then got a job at a club called the LaFlame near the Air Force base in Orlando. Charlie Daniels went there as the main attraction once, and his guitarist quit and he was playing bass. They decided to have lunch together and Daniels told Joel that if he cut his hair, he could play in his band called the Jaguars.

A few years later, DiGregorio was drafted and served with the US Army. Upon his return home, he resumed his career with Daniels and following some ensemble changes The Charlie Daniels Band launched what became a commercially successful body of work, beginning with their self-titled debut album in 1970. In 1979, their signature hit "The Devil Went Down To Georgia," which achieved a number 3 placing on the US Pop Charts, was co-written by DiGregorio. In addition to his work with Daniels, he recorded the solo projects Midnight in Savannah (2008) and Shake Rag (2008).

=== Charlie Daniels Band ===
The original Charlie Daniels Band was Charlie, Jerry Corbitt from the Youngbloods, Billy Cox from the Band of Gypsys, Jeffrey Meyer, and Taz. They stayed together for six months, but then it didn't work out. After that, it was Charlie, Taz, Jeffrey, and Earl Grigsby. The original Charlie Daniels Band can still be heard on a bootleg album called Corbitt and Daniels, Live from Carnegie Hall.

== Nickname ==
From the Charlie Daniels Band album Te John, Grease, & Wolfman, which the name comes from the band members' nicknames, "Te John" was the bassist, "Wolfman" the drummer, and Joel, being that he was half Italian and half French Canadian was "Grease". According to DiGregorio, "Charlie loves giving people nicknames," which is "one of those Southern rock cultural things." Taz got his nickname from when they were on the tour bus with their first road manager named Jesse Craig. Joel had his hair down past his shoulders and once, his hair was sticking up and Jesse was laughing and saying that he looked like a Tasmanian devil. Then Charlie was joking around and called him "Taz". The nickname "Grease" never stuck, but "Taz" did.

== Death ==
DiGregorio was killed in a single car accident on Interstate 40 in Cheatham County, Tennessee, on October 12, 2011. He was driving to meet the band's tour bus, which was headed to a concert set for Wednesday night in Cumming, Georgia. He was 67 years old.
