= George Marino discography =

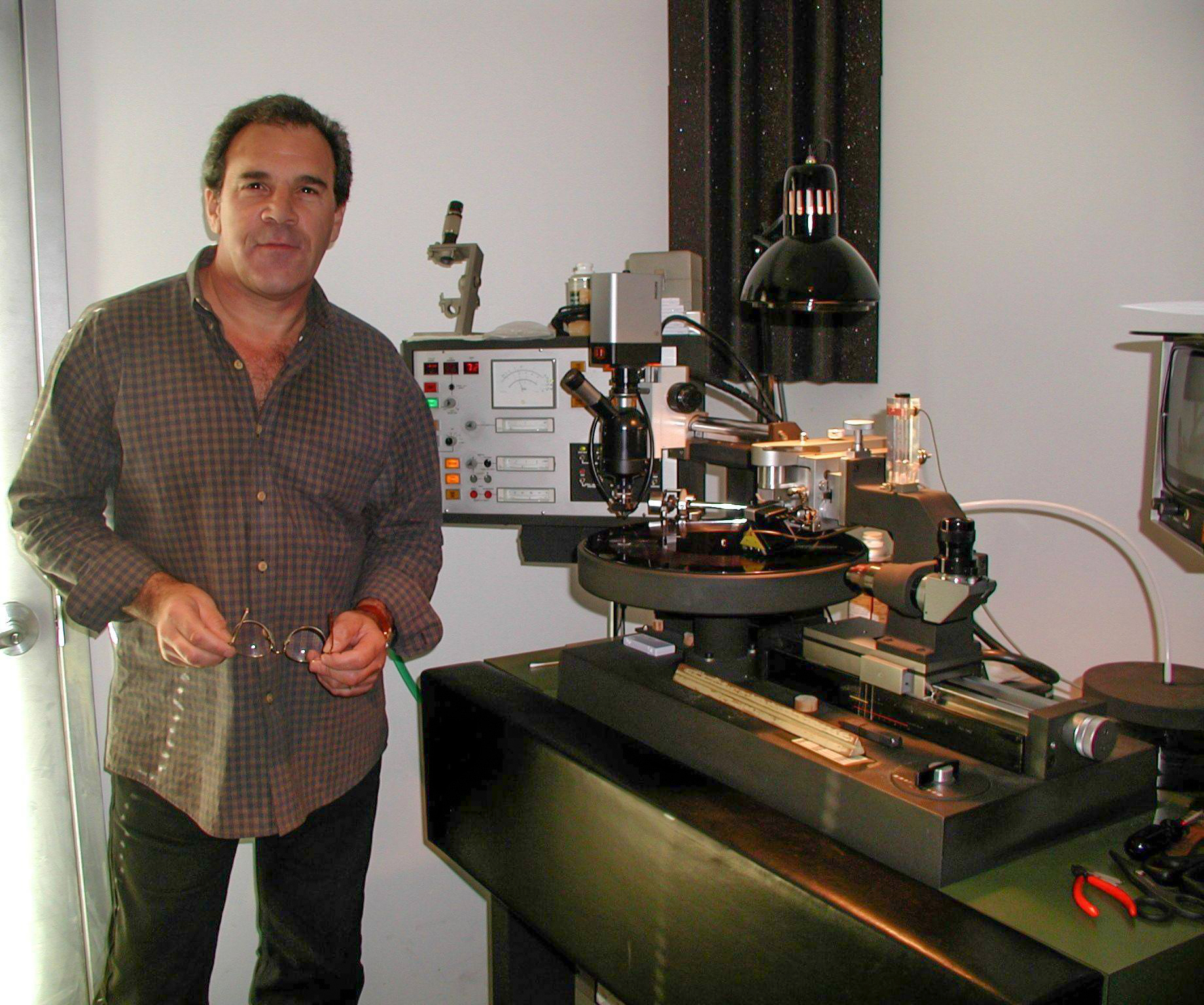
Marino next to a lathe at Sterling Sound

George Marino (1947–2012) was an American mastering engineer known for working on albums by rock bands starting in the late 1960s. Marino mastered and remastered thousands of albums in over forty years. He started his career at Capitol Records and was there from 1967 to 1971, then became a partner in the Record Plant's Master Cutting Room from 1971 to 1973. Marino spent the vast majority of his career mastering at Sterling Sound from 1973 until his death in 2012.

== Selected works ==
=== 1969 – 1980 ===
- 1969 Live Peace in Toronto 1969 – John Lennon & Plastic Ono Band
- 1970 The Morning After – The J. Geils Band
- 1971 5'll Getcha Ten – Cowboy
- 1971 Electric Warrior – T. Rex
- 1971 Fly – Yoko Ono
- 1971 Liv – Livingston Taylor
- 1972 Fresh – Raspberries
- 1972 Odyssey – Odyssey
- 1972 Talking Book – Stevie Wonder
- 1972 Dinnertime – Alex Taylor
- 1973 Innervisions – Stevie Wonder
- 1973 Approximately Infinite Universe – Yoko Ono
- 1973 Billion Dollar Babies – Alice Cooper
- 1973 Bloodshot – The J. Geils Band
- 1973 Feeling the Space – Yoko Ono
- 1973 Laid Back – Gregg Allman
- 1973 Brothers and Sisters – The Allman Brothers Band
- 1974 A New Life – The Marshall Tucker Band
- 1974 Highway Call – Richard Betts
- 1974 Kiss – Kiss
- 1974 Nightmares...and Other Tales from the Vinyl Jungle – The J. Geils Band
- 1974 The Gregg Allman Tour – Gregg Allman
- 1974 Where We All Belong – The Marshall Tucker Band
- 1974 He Don't Love You, Like I Love You – Tony Orlando and Dawn
- 1974 Tasty – The Good Rats
- 1974 Reunion in Central Park – The Blues Project
- 1974 Prime Time – Tony Orlando and Dawn
- 1975 Not a Word on It – Pete Carr
- 1975 Physical Graffiti – Led Zeppelin
- 1975 Searchin' for a Rainbow - The Marshall Tucker Band
- 1975 Straight Shooter – Bad Company
- 1975 No Reservations – Blackfoot
- 1975 Skybird – Tony Orlando and Dawn
- 1976 A Fifth of Beethoven – Walter Murphy
- 1976 Helluva Band – Angel
- 1976 Honor Among Thieves – Artful Dodger
- 1976 Leftoverture – Kansas
- 1976 Long Hard Ride – The Marshall Tucker Band
- 1976 Radio Ethiopia – Patti Smith Group
- 1976 Saddle Tramp – The Charlie Daniels Band
- 1976 High Lonesome – The Charlie Daniels Band
- 1976 Stuff – Stuff
- 1976 Some People Can Do What They Like – Robert Palmer
- 1977 Derringer Live – Rick Derringer
- 1977 Draw the Line – Aerosmith
- 1977 In Color – Cheap Trick
- 1977 Monkey Island – The J. Geils Band
- 1977 Point of Know Return – Kansas
- 1977 So So Satisfied – Ashford & Simpson
- 1977 The Wetter The Better – Wet Willie
- 1977 Firefall – Firefall
- 1977 Children of the World – Bee Gees
- 1977 Double Vision – Foreigner
- 1977 Carolina Dreams – The Marshall Tucker Band
- 1977 I'm in You – Peter Frampton
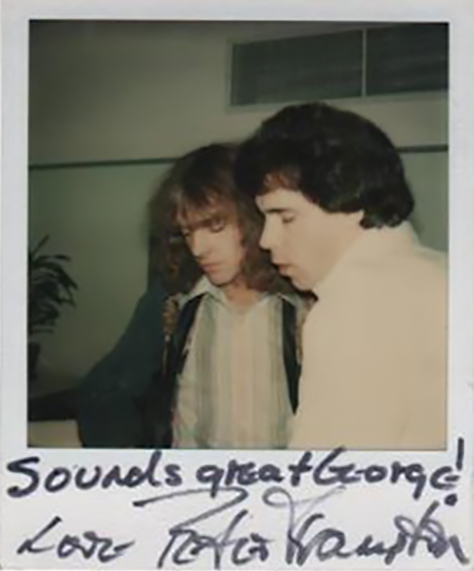
  George Marino and Peter Frampton
- 1977 Feelin' Bitchy – Millie Jackson
- 1977 Here at Last... Bee Gees... Live – Bee Gees
- 1977 Let There Be Rock – AC/DC
- 1977 On Earth as It Is in Heaven – Angel
- 1977 Once Upon a Dream – Enchantment
- 1977 Overnight Angels – Ian Hunter
- 1977 Raisin' Hell – Elvin Bishop
- 1977 Redwing – Grinderswitch
- 1977 Short Trip to Space – John Tropea
- 1977 The Doctor Is In – Ben Sidran
- 1977 Alive II – Kiss
- 1977 Sweet Evil – Derringer
- 1977 Midnight Wind – The Charlie Daniels Band
- 1977 Dickey Betts & Great Southern – Dickey Betts & Great Southern
- 1978 A Little Kiss in the Night – Ben Sidran
- 1978 Double Dose – Hot Tuna
- 1978 Gene Simmons – Kiss
- 1978 Heaven Tonight – Cheap Trick
- 1978 Jaded Virgin – Marshall Chapman
- 1978 Jazz – Queen
- 1978 Live – Frank Marino & Mahogany Rush
- 1978 Paul Stanley – Kiss
- 1978 Safety in Numbers – Crack the Sky
- 1978 The Cars – The Cars
- 1978 Flirtin' with Disaster – Molly Hatchet
- 1978 Head Games – Foreigner
- 1978 In Through the Out Door – Led Zeppelin
- 1978 Live Killers – Queen
- 1978 Night in the Ruts – Aerosmith
- 1978 Ace Frehley – Kiss
- 1978 Heart to Heart – David Sanborn
- 1978 Atlanta's Burning Down – Dickey Betts & Great Southern
- 1978 Two for the Show – Kansas
- 1979 A Different Kind of Crazy – Head East
- 1979 Cheap Trick at Budokan – Cheap Trick
- 1979 Breaking Loose – Helix
- 1979 Dream Police – Cheap Trick
- 1979 Dreams of Tomorrow – Lonnie Liston Smith
- 1979 First Glance – April Wine
- 1979 Hideaway – David Sanborn
- 1979 High and Outside – Steve Goodman
- 1979 In Style – David Johansen
- 1979 Jackrabbit Slim – Steve Forbert
- 1979 Sinful – Angel
- 1979 Somewhere in My Lifetime – Phyllis Hyman
- 1979 You're Never Alone with a Schizophrenic – Ian Hunter
- 1979 In the Eye of the Storm – Outlaws
- 1979 Spirits Having Flown – Bee Gees
- 1979 Guitars and Women – Rick Derringer
- 1979 Dynasty – Kiss
- 1979 Candy-O – The Cars

=== 1980s – 1990s ===
- 1980 Blizzard of Ozz – Ozzy Osbourne
- 1980 Double Fantasy – John Lennon/Yoko Ono
- 1980 Feel the Heat – Henry Paul Band
- 1980 For Men Only – Millie Jackson
- 1980 Have a Good Time but Get Out Alive! – The Iron City Houserockers
- 1980 Humans – Bruce Cockburn
- 1980 I Had to Say It – Millie Jackson
- 1980 Reach for the Sky – The Allman Brothers Band
- 1980 Unmasked – Kiss
- 1980 What Cha' Gonna Do for Me – Chaka Khan
- 1980 Go to Heaven – Grateful Dead
- 1980 Undertow – Firefall
- 1980 Naughty – Chaka Khan
- 1980 Dregs of the Earth – Dixie Dregs
- 1980 Danger Zone – Sammy Hagar
- 1981 Believers – Don McLean
- 1981 Air Raid – Air Raid
- 1981 Bad for Good – Jim Steinman
- 1981 Belo Horizonte – John McLaughlin
- 1981 Bobby and the Midnites – Bobby and the Midnites
- 1981 Breaking All the Rules – Peter Frampton
- 1981 Danny Joe Brown and the Danny Joe Brown Band – Danny Joe Brown
- 1981 Diary of a Madman – Ozzy Osbourne
- 1981 Don't Say No – Billy Squier
- 1981 Early Damage – Urban Verbs
- 1981 Earthshaker – Y&T
- 1981 Full House: Aces High – The Amazing Rhythm Aces
- 1981 Fun in Space – Roger Taylor
- 1981 Get Lucky – Loverboy
- 1981 I'm In Love – Evelyn "Champagne" King
- 1981 Inner City Front – Bruce Cockburn
- 1981 Iron Age – Mother's Finest
- 1981 Living in a Movie – Gary Myrick
- 1981 Nature of the Beast – April Wine
- 1981 North Coast – Michael Stanley Band
- 1981 Only a Lad – Oingo Boingo
- 1981 Power of Rock 'n' Roll – Frank Marino
- 1981 Shake It Up – The Cars
- 1981 Special Identity – Joanne Brackeen
- 1981 Take No Prisoners – Molly Hatchet
- 1981 The Producers – The Producers
- 1981 The Wild, The Willing and the Innocent – UFO
- 1981 Unsung Heroes – The Dregs
- 1981 Walking on Thin Ice – Yoko Ono
- 1981 Voyeur – David Sanborn
- 1981 Peter Cetera – Peter Cetera
- 1981 4 – Foreigner
- 1981 Here Comes the Night – David Johansen
- 1981 Creatures of the Night – Kiss
- 1981 Turn Back – Toto
- 1982 Another Grey Area – Graham Parker
- 1982 Backstreet – David Sanborn
- 1982 Beatitude – Ric Ocasek
- 1982 Coup d'Etat – Plasmatics
- 1982 Hot Space – Queen
- 1982 Industry Standard – The Dixie Dregs
- 1982 It's Alright (I See Rainbows) – Yoko Ono
- 1982 Juggernaut – Frank Marino
- 1982 Levon Helm – Levon Helm
- 1982 Los Hombres Malo – Outlaws
- 1982 Mechanix – UFO
- 1982 Objects of Desire – Michael Franks
- 1982 Old Songs for the New Depression – Ben Sidran
- 1982 One on One – Cheap Trick
- 1982 Power Play – April Wine
- 1982 The Art of Control – Peter Frampton
- 1982 Times of Our Lives – Judy Collins
- 1982 World Radio – Leo Sayer
- 1982 Rebel Yell – Billy Idol
- 1982 Toto IV – Toto
- 1983 First Strike – Cobra
- 1983 Frontiers – Journey
- 1983 Holy Diver – Dio
- 1983 In Your Eyes – George Benson
- 1983 Lick It Up – Kiss
- 1983 Passion, Grace & Fire – Paco de Lucía
- 1983 Rescue- Clarence Clemons & the Red Bank Rockers
- 1983 She's So Unusual – Cyndi Lauper
- 1983 Shout at the Devil – Mötley Crüe
- 1983 The Trouble with Normal – Bruce Cockburn
- 1983 What's Funk? – Grand Funk Railroad
- 1983 Bon Jovi – Bon Jovi
- 1983 Condition Critical – Quiet Riot
- 1984 Chicago 17 – Chicago
- 1984 '74 Jailbreak – AC/DC
- 1984 Animalize – Kiss
- 1984 Bad Attitude – Meat Loaf
- 1984 Bop City – Ben Sidran
- 1984 Crusader – Saxon
- 1984 Gato...Para los Amigos – Gato Barbieri
- 1984 Go Insane – Lindsey Buckingham
- 1984 Heartbeat City – The Cars
- 1984 Hot Shot – Pat Travers
- 1984 Marcus Miller – Marcus Miller
- 1984 Medicine Show – The Dream Syndicate
- 1984 Milk and Honey – John Lennon
- 1984 Powerslave – Iron Maiden
- 1984 Ride the Lightning – Metallica
- 1984 Straight to the Heart – David Sanborn
- 1984 Street Talk – Steve Perry
- 1984 The Blitz – Krokus
- 1984 The Last in Line – Dio
- 1984 Tooth and Nail – Dokken
- 1984 W.O.W. – Wendy O. Williams
- 1984 Where Angels Fear to Tread – Heaven
- 1984 Windows and Walls – Dan Fogelberg
- 1985 True Colors – Cyndi Lauper
- 1985 7800° Fahrenheit – Bon Jovi
- 1985 Ain't Love Grand! – X
- 1985 All Those Wasted Years - Hanoi Rocks
- 1985 Armed and Dangerous – Anthrax
- 1985 Double Trouble Live – Molly Hatchet
- 1985 Eaten Alive – Diana Ross
- 1985 Fly on the Wall – AC/DC
- 1985 Go West – Go West
- 1985 Hero – Clarence Clemons & the Red Bank Rockers
- 1985 High Country Snows – Dan Fogelberg
- 1985 Nervous Night – The Hooters
- 1985 No Muss...No Fuss – Donnie Iris
- 1985 On the Cool Side – Ben Sidran
- 1985 Play Deep – The Outfield
- 1985 Skin Dive – Michael Franks
- 1985 Standing on the Edge – Cheap Trick
- 1985 Steady Nerves – Graham Parker & the Shot
- 1985 Whitney Houston – Whitney Houston
- 1986 Alive & Screamin' – Krokus
- 1986 Bangin' – The Outfield
- 1986 Beauty in the Beast – Wendy Carlos
- 1986 Chicago 18 – Chicago
- 1986 Enough Is Enough – Billy Squier
- 1986 From Luxury to Heartache – Culture Club
- 1986 Inside the Electric Circus – W.A.S.P.
- 1986 John Eddie – John Eddie
- 1986 Johnny Comes Marching Home – The Del-Lords
- 1986 Kommander of Kaos – Wendy O. Williams
- 1986 Love's Gonna Get Ya! – Ricky Skaggs
- 1986 Master of Puppets – Metallica
- 1986 Menlove Ave. – John Lennon
- 1986 Slippery When Wet – Bon Jovi
- 1986 Somewhere in Time – Iron Maiden
- 1986 Songs from the Film – Tommy Keene
- 1986 Street Language – Rodney Crowell
- 1986 The Doctor – Cheap Trick
- 1986 Those of You with or Without Children, You'll Understand – Bill Cosby
- 1986 True Colors – Cyndi Lauper
- 1986 Whiplash Smile – Billy Idol
- 1986 Whitney – Whitney Houston
- 1987 Appetite for Destruction – Guns N' Roses
- 1987 Door to Door – The Cars
- 1987 Dream Evil – Dio
- 1987 E.S.P. – Bee Gees
- 1987 Elisa Fiorillo – Elisa Fiorillo
- 1987 Exiles – Dan Fogelberg
- 1987 Happy Together – The Nylons
- 1987 I'm the Man – Anthrax
- 1987 King's Record Shop – Rosanne Cash
- 1987 Live... in the Raw – W.A.S.P.
- 1987 Midnight to Midnight – The Psychedelic Furs
- 1987 Obsession – Bob James
- 1987 Once Bitten... – Great White
- 1987 One Way Home – The Hooters
- 1987 Permanent Vacation – Aerosmith
- 1987 Pride – White Lion
- 1987 Surfing with the Alien – Joe Satriani
- 1987 Unfinished Business – Ronnie Spector
- 1987 Non Stop – Julio Iglesias
- 1988 Wide Awake in Dreamland – Pat Benatar
- 1988 ...And Justice for All – Metallica
- 1988 Blow Up Your Video – AC/DC
- 1988 Close-Up – David Sanborn
- 1988 Exciter – Exciter
- 1988 G N' R Lies – Guns N' Roses
- 1988 Kings of the Sun – Kings of the Sun
- 1988 Lita – Lita Ford
- 1988 New Jersey – Bon Jovi
- 1988 Nice Place to Visit – Frozen Ghost
- 1988 No Place for Disgrace – Flotsam and Jetsam
- 1988 Notes from America – Bonnie Tyler
- 1988 Outrider – Jimmy Page
- 1988 Racing After Midnight – Honeymoon Suite
- 1988 Second Sighting – Ace Frehley
- 1988 Seventh Son of a Seventh Son – Iron Maiden
- 1988 Shooting Rubberbands at the Stars – Edie Brickell & New Bohemians
- 1988 Social Intercourse – Smashed Gladys
- 1988 Sweet Dreams – Sword
- 1988 The Headless Children – W.A.S.P.
- 1988 Too Hot to Touch – Ben Sidran
- 1988 Under the Influence – Overkill
- 1988 Wide Awake in Dreamland – Pat Benatar
- 1988 Wild Wild West – The Escape Club
- 1989 A Night to Remember – Cyndi Lauper
- 1989 Bad English – Bad English
- 1989 Big Game – White Lion
- 1989 Bleach – Nirvana
- 1989 Dr. Feelgood – Mötley Crüe
- 1989 Hard Volume – Rollins Band
- 1989 Human Soul – Graham Parker
- 1989 Little Caesar – Little Caesar
- 1989 Love + War – Lillian Axe
- 1989 Magnum Cum Louder – Hoodoo Gurus
- 1989 Mother's Milk – Red Hot Chili Peppers
- 1989 One – Bee Gees
- 1989 Point Blank – Bonfire
- 1989 Raging Slab – Raging Slab
- 1989 Sea Hags – Sea Hags
- 1989 Slowly We Rot – Obituary
- 1989 Smoking in the Fields – The Del Fuegos
- 1989 The Great Radio Controversy – Tesla
- 1989 Trash – Alice Cooper
- 1989 Twice Shy – Great White
- 1989 Wishing Like a Mountain and Thinking Like the Sea – Poi Dog Pondering
- 1989 Young Man's Blues – Rock City Angels
- 1989 Zig Zag – The Hooters
- 1989 Flesh & Blood – Poison
- 1989 I'm Your Baby Tonight – Whitney Houston

=== 1990s to 2000s ===
- 1990 Act III – Death Angel
- 1990 Barão: Ao Vivo – Barão Vermelho
- 1990 Busted – Cheap Trick
- 1990 Danzig II: Lucifuge – Danzig
- 1990 Dig – Rob Mounsey & Flying Monkey Orchestra
- 1990 Five Man Acoustical Jam – Tesla
- 1990 Flesh & Blood – Poison
- 1990 Ghost of a Dog – Edie Brickell & New Bohemians
- 1990 Kojiki – Kitaro
- 1990 Last Decade Dead Century – Warrior Soul
- 1990 Lock up the Wolves – Dio
- 1990 Never, Neverland – Annihilator
- 1990 Pass It on Down – Alabama
- 1990 Rev It Up – Vixen
- 1990 Rituals – Michael Colina
- 1990 Saigon Kick – Saigon Kick
- 1990 Stiletto – Lita Ford
- 1990 Take It to Heart – Michael McDonald
- 1990 The Razor's Edge – AC/DC
- 1990 Up from the Ashes – Don Dokken
- 1991 A Little Ain't Enough – David Lee Roth
- 1991 Cool Cat Blues – Georgie Fame
- 1991 Creatures of Habit – Billy Squier
- 1991 Damn Right, I've Got the Blues – Buddy Guy
- 1991 Drugs, God and the New Republic – Warrior Soul
- 1991 Fly Me Courageous – Drivin' n Cryin'
- 1991 Heavy Bones – Heavy Bones
- 1991 Hellacious Acres – Dangerous Toys
- 1991 Hot Wire – Kix
- 1991 Joyride – Roxette
- 1991 Kitaro Live in America – Kitaro
- 1991 Lights out on the Playground – Baton Rouge
- 1991 Lovescape – Neil Diamond
- 1991 Mane Attraction – White Lion
- 1991 Metallica – Metallica
- 1991 Places I Have Never Been – Willie Nile
- 1991 Schubert Dip – EMF
- 1991 Set the Night to Music – Roberta Flack
- 1991 Shadow of Urbano – Michael Colina
- 1991 Slave to the Grind – Skid Row
- 1991 Smile Blue – Ricky Peterson
- 1991 Steelheart – Steelheart
- 1991 Struck by Lightning – Graham Parker
- 1991 Sue Medley – Sue Medley
- 1991 The Heat – Dan Reed Network
- 1991 Until She Comes – The Psychedelic Furs
- 1991 Use Your Illusion I – Guns N' Roses
- 1991 Use Your Illusion II – Guns N' Roses
- 1991 World Outside- The Psychedelic Furs
- 1992 A Dove – The Roches
- 1992 Blind Melon – Blind Melon
- 1992 Dog Eat Dog – Warrant
- 1992 Dream – Kitaro
- 1992 Feel This – The Jeff Healey Band
- 1992 Fire & Ice – Yngwie Malmsteen
- 1992 Force of Habit – Exodus
- 1992 Generation Terrorists – Manic Street Preachers
- 1992 Keep the Faith – Bon Jovi
- 1992 AC/DC Live – AC/DC
- 1992 Mitch Malloy – Mitch Malloy
- 1992 New Miserable Experience – Gin Blossoms
- 1992 One – Riverside
- 1992 Plaid – Blues Saraceno
- 1992 Revenge – Kiss
- 1992 Rocks in the Head – Roger Daltrey
- 1992 Salutations from the Ghetto Nation – Warrior Soul
- 1992 Skew Siskin - Skew Siskin
- 1992 The Battle Rages On... – Deep Purple
- 1992 The Christmas Album – Neil Diamond
- 1992 The Lizard – Saigon Kick
- 1992 The Ritual – Testament
- 1992 The Silent Majority – Life, Sex & Death
- 1992 The Woman I Am – Chaka Khan
- 1992 Tongues and Tails – Sophie B. Hawkins
- 1992 Urban Discipline – Biohazard
- 1993 Animals with Human Intelligence – Enuff Z'nuff
- 1993 Back to Broadway – Barbra Streisand
- 1993 Believe in Me – Duff McKagan
- 1993 Bloody Kisses – Type O Negative
- 1993 Brother Cane – Brother Cane
- 1993 Chaos A.D. – Sepultura
- 1993 Chill Pill – Warrior Soul
- 1993 Desire Walks On – Heart
- 1993 Devotion – Warren Hill
- 1993 Dig – I Mother Earth
- 1993 Dream Harder – The Waterboys
- 1993 Face the Heat – Scorpions
- 1993 Half Way Home – Half Way Home
- 1993 Heaven & Earth – Kitaro
- 1993 Heavenly Bodie – Gene Loves Jezebel
- 1993 Letters from a Paper Ship – Billy Falcon
- 1993 Nothin' But Trouble – Blue Murder
- 1993 Oh! – Will Lee
- 1993 On Display – Eric Gadd
- 1993 Out of Body – The Hooters
- 1993 Psycofunkster Au Lait – La Union
- 1993 River Runs Red – Life of Agony
- 1993 Sister Sweetly – Big Head Todd & the Monsters
- 1993 Slip – Quicksand
- 1993 Smeared – Sloan
- 1993 Tales of Ordinary Madness – Warren Haynes
- 1993 The Spaghetti Incident? – Guns N' Roses
- 1993 The Vanishing Race – Air Supply
- 1993 Transnational Speedway League: Anthems, Anecdotes & Undeniable Truths – Clutch
- 1993 Up on the Roof: Songs from the Brill Building – Neil Diamond
- 1993 Za-Za – Bulletboys
- 1994 Big Ones -Aerosmith
- 1994 Boingo- Oingo Boingo
- 1994 Box of Fire – Aerosmith
- 1994 Bust a Nut – Tesla
- 1994 Come Hell or High Water – Deep Purple
- 1994 Crash! Boom! Bang! – Roxette
- 1994 Cross Road: The Best of Bon Jovi – Bon Jovi
- 1994 Defense Mechanism – Monster Voodoo Machine
- 1994 For Madmen Only – Atomic Opera
- 1994 Grace – Jeff Buckley
- 1994 Hell & High Water: The Best of the Arista Years – The Allman Brothers Band
- 1994 Hungry for Stink – L7
- 1994 Land of Broken Hearts – Royal Hunt
- 1994 Life's a Lesson – Ben Sidran
- 1994 Live on Planet Earth – Neville Brothers
- 1994 Mandala – Kitaro
- 1994 Mötley Crüe – Mötley Crüe
- 1994 Pride & Glory – Pride & Glory
- 1994 Push Comes to Shove – Jackyl
- 1994 Ride – Godspeed
- 1994 Sail Away – Great White
- 1994 Slippin' In – Buddy Guy
- 1994 State Voodoo/State Control – Monster Voodoo Machine
- 1994 Still Climbing – Cinderella
- 1994 Strange Highways – Dio
- 1994 The Cult – The Cult
- 1994 Truth – Warren Hill
- 1994 Unboxed – Sammy Hagar
- 1994 Weezer (Blue Album) – Weezer
- 1994 World Demise – Obituary
- 1994 Your Filthy Little Mouth – David Lee Roth
- 1995 $1.99 Romances – God Street Wine
- 1995 Balance – Van Halen
- 1995 Ballbreaker – AC/DC
- 1995 Because They Can – Nelson
- 1995 Bette of Roses – Bette Midler
- 1995 Burnin' Up – A Flock of Seagulls
- 1995 Clown In the Mirror – Royal Hunt
- 1995 Demanufacture – Fear Factory
- 1995 Driver Not Included – Orange 9mm
- 1995 Dysfunctional – Dokken
- 1995 Love Is Strange – Phil Upchurch
- 1995 Manic Compression – Quicksand
- 1995 Movin' Up/Adventure Time – The Elvis Brothers
- 1995 Mugzy's Move – Royal Crown Revue
- 1995 Natural Woman – Giorgia
- 1995 No Joke! – Meat Puppets
- 1995 Once Upon the Cross – Deicide
- 1995 Ozzmosis – Ozzy Osbourne
- 1995 Passion, Grace and Fire/Live...One Summer N – Paco de Lucía
- 1995 Psyclone – Jimmy Barnes
- 1995 Relish – Joan Osborne
- 1995 Rising – Yoko Ono
- 1995 Seemless – Into Another
- 1995 Set Your Goals – CIV
- 1995 Show Business – Kix
- 1995 Tear Can Tell – Ricky Peterson
- 1995 Temple Bar – John Waite
- 1995 The Space Age Playboys – Warrior Soul
- 1995 The Christmas Album – David Foster
- 1995 These Days – Bon Jovi
- 1995 Time Was – Curtis Stigers
- 1995 Tonin' – The Manhattan Transfer
- 1995 Twelve Deadly Cyns ... and then Some – Cyndi Lauper
- 1995 Ugly – Life of Agony
- 1995 Why the Long Face – Big Country
- 1995 Wrapped in Sky – Drivin' n Cryin'
- 1995 You Dreamer [UK #1] – Big Country
- 1995 ¡Adios Amigos! – The Ramones
- 1995 A Flock of Seagulls – A Flock of Seagulls
- 1995 Living in Fear – The Power Station
- 1995 Load – Metallica
- 1996 Standing in My Shoes – Leo Kottke
- 1996 5 Live – Fluffy
- 1996 Alfagamabetizado – Carlinhos Brown
- 1996 Baile de MasCaras – Maldita Vecindad
- 1996 Bang, The Earth is Round – The Sugarplastic
- 1996 Black Eye – Fluffy
- 1996 Blues and Me – Georgie Fame
- 1996 Box of Frogs/Strange Land – Box of Frogs
- 1996 Cambio De Piel – Alejandra Guzmán
- 1996 Come Find Yourself – Fun Lovin' Criminals
- 1996 Early Recordings – Joan Osborne
- 1996 High/Low – Nada Surf
- 1996 Hooterization – The Hooters
- 1996 Immortal – Beth Hart
- 1996 LifeLines Live – Peter, Paul and Mary
- 1996 Light at the End of the World – A Flock of Seagulls
- 1996 Living With Ghosts – Patty Griffin
- 1996 Living in Fear – The Power Station
- 1996 Load – Metallica
- 1996 Louder Than Hell – Manowar
- 1996 Magnolia – The Screamin' Cheetah Wheelies
- 1996 Michael McDermott – Michael McDermott
- 1996 Miles to Go – Don Lewis Band
- 1996 Mr. P's Shuffle – Ben Sidran
- 1996 No Lunch – D Generation
- 1996 October Rust – Type O Negative
- 1996 One Chord to Another – Sloan
- 1996 One More Go Round – Giorgia
- 1996 Oz Factor – Unwritten Law
- 1996 Piece of Your Soul – Storyville
- 1996 Pinkerton – Weezer
- 1996 Power Pop, Vol. 1 – The Raspberries
- 1996 Pure Instinct – Scorpions
- 1996 Red – God Street Wine
- 1996 The Gray Race – Bad Religion
- 1996 The Roots of Sepultura – Sepultura
- 1996 Then Again, Maybe I Won't – Johnny Bravo
- 1996 Trial by Fire – Journey
- 1996 We the People – Groove Collective
- 1996 White Light White Heat White Trash – Social Distortion
- 1997 24 Karat Hits! – Elvis Presley
- 1997 A Story – Yoko Ono
- 1997 American Lesion – American Lesion
- 1997 Bonfire – AC/DC
- 1997 Circlesongs – Bobby McFerrin
- 1997 Come Walk with Me – Oleta Adams
- 1997 Come In and Burn – Rollins Band
- 1997 Definitive Collection – Eric Carmen
- 1997 Destination Anywhere – Jon Bon Jovi
- 1997 Egyptology – World Party
- 1997 Eight Arms to Hold You – Veruca Salt
- 1997 Eleanor McEvoy – Eleanor McEvoy
- 1997 Feeding the Future – Dogma
- 1997 First Rays of the New Rising Sun – Jimi Hendrix
- 1997 G3: Live in Concert – Joe Satriani
- 1997 Love Is a Dog from Hell – Maggie Estep
- 1997 Neverland – Night Ranger
- 1997 No Holds Barred: Live in Europe – Biohazard
- 1997 Once upon a ... – Cinderella
- 1997 One More Time – Real McCoy
- 1997 Reload – Metallica
- 1997 Resolution – .38 Special
- 1997 Restraining Bolt – Radish
- 1997 Richard Julian – Richard Julian
- 1997 Sand and Water – Beth Nielsen Chapman
- 1997 Sisters of Avalon – Cyndi Lauper
- 1997 Soul Searching Sun – Life of Agony
- 1997 South Saturn Delta – Jimi Hendrix
- 1997 Standing in My Shoes – Leo Kottke
- 1997 The Big 3 – 60 Ft. Dolls
- 1997 The Cicadas – The Cicadas
- 1997 The Truth – Brady Seals
- 1997 The World According to Per Gessle – Per Gessle
- 1997 Troublizing – Ric Ocasek
- 1997 Uma Outra Estação – Legião Urbana
- 1997 We Can't All Be Angels – David Lee Murphy
- 1997 Where Are You Now – Deanna Kirk
- 1998 100% Columbian – Fun Lovin' Criminals
- 1998 99th Dream – Swervedriver
- 1998 Better Than This – The Normals
- 1998 Brady Seals – Brady Seals
- 1998 Breed the Killers – Earth Crisis
- 1998 Colin James and the Little Big Band II – Colin James
- 1998 Crystal Planet – Joe Satriani
- 1998 Dose – Gov't Mule
- 1998 Eddie's Head – Iron Maiden
- 1998 Flaming Red – Patty Griffin
- 1998 Garage, Inc. – Metallica
- 1998 Go Faster – The Black Crowes
- 1998 Heavy Love – Buddy Guy
- 1998 I'm So Confused – Jonathan Richman
- 1998 Just What You Want – Eboni Foster
- 1998 Little Piece of Heaven – Neville Brothers
- 1998 Merry Christmas ... Have a Nice Life! – Cyndi Lauper
- 1998 My Way or the Highway – Tuscadero
- 1998 Naked – Brownie Mary
- 1998 Navy Blues – Sloan
- 1998 New Sheets – Possum Dixon
- 1998 Ordinary Time – Jim Morgan
- 1998 Pack Up the Cats – Local H
- 1998 Prisoner of Love – Russ Columbo
- 1998 Psycho Circus – Kiss
- 1998 So Real – Kenny Smith
- 1998 Soulfly – Soulfly
- 1998 The Contender – Royal Crown Revue
- 1998 When You're in Love (For the First Time) – Steve Perry
- 1998 Wonsaponatime – John Lennon
- 1999 Parachutes – Coldplay
- 1999 Razorblade Romance – H.I.M.
- 1999 A Place in the Sun – Lit
- 1999 A Tempestade ou O Livro Dos Dias – Legião Urbana
- 1999 Between the Bridges – Sloan
- 1999 Bleach – Bleach
- 1999 Born Again Savage – Little Steven & the Disciples of Soul
- 1999 By Your Side – The Black Crowes
- 1999 Celtic Solstice – Paul Winter
- 1999 Chamber Music – Coal Chamber
- 1999 Home - Annie Minogue
- 1999 Depleting Moral Legacy – Leo Sidran
- 1999 From Beyond the Back Burner – Gas Giants
- 1999 Happiness Is Not a Fish That You Can Catch – Our Lady Peace
- 1999 Have a Nice Day – Roxette
- 1999 Hot Animal Machine/Drive By Shooting [1999] – Henry Rollins
- 1999 Insert Band Here: Live in Australia 1990 – Rollins Band
- 1999 Is Anybody Home? – Our Lady Peace
- 1999 Joy: A Holiday Collection – Jewel
- 1999 L'Intégrale Bercy – France Gall
- 1999 Live at Celebrity Lounge – Ben Sidran
- 1999 Live at Woodstock – Jimi Hendrix
- 1999 Live at the Budokan – Chic
- 1999 Live at the Fillmore East – Jimi Hendrix
- 1999 Live: Era '87–'93 – Guns N' Roses
- 1999 Llegó Van Van – Los Van Van
- 1999 Mimosa – Fun Lovin' Criminals
- 1999 Only a Fool [US CD Single] – The Black Crowes
- 1999 Proud Like a God – Guano Apes
- 1999 Red Carpet Sindrome – Bolt Upright
- 1999 S&M – Metallica
- 1999 Spirit – Peter Buffett
- 1999 The Ladder – Yes
- 1999 Throttle Junkies – Soil
- 1999 Torch This Place – The Atomic Fireballs
- 1999 Tropico/Seven the Hard Way – Pat Benatar
- 1999 Under a Violet Moon – Blackmore's Night
- 1999 Valence Street – Neville Brothers
- 1999 World Coming Down – Type O Negative
- 1999 Wrathchild – Iron Maiden

=== 2000 – 2012 ===
- 2000 Iowa – Slipknot
- 2000 The Latin Porter – Mark Murphy
- 2000 Silver Side Up – Nickelback
- 2000 Stiff Upper Lip – AC/DC
- 2000 3001 – Rita Lee
- 2000 A Place To Stand – The Killdares
- 2000 Ain't Life Grand – Slash's Snakepit
- 2000 An Education in Rebellion – The Union Underground
- 2000 An Evening with the Blues – Mark Cook
- 2000 Another Spin Around the Sun – Edwin
- 2000 As Dez Mais – Titãs
- 2000 Beautiful Something – Mars Electric
- 2000 Blue Night – Michael Learns to Rock
- 2000 Brave New World – Iron Maiden
- 2000 Christmas Stays the Same – Linda Eder
- 2000 Crush – Bon Jovi
- 2000 Draw Them Near – Jess Klein
- 2000 Experiment on a Flat Planet – Soulhat
- 2000 Full Devil Jacket – Full Devil Jacket
- 2000 Fuzzbubble – Fuzzbubble
- 2000 Get Some Go Again – Rollins Band
- 2000 Good to the Last Drop – God Street Wine
- 2000 Hagnesta Hill – Kent
- 2000 I Ett Vinterland – Ulf Lundell
- 2000 If You Sleep – Tal Bachman
- 2000 Into the Light – David Coverdale
- 2000 Introduction to Mayhem – Primer 55
- 2000 Isopor – Pato Fu
- 2000 Kingpin – Tinsley Ellis
- 2000 L. Sid – Leo Sidran
- 2000 Live at the Agora Ballroom Atlanta, Georgia April 20, 1979 [Phoenix Gems] – Molly Hatchet
- 2000 Live at the Greek – The Black Crowes
- 2000 Parachutes – Coldplay
- 2000 Razorblade Romance – H.I.M.
- 2000 Song to Fly – Song to Fly
- 2000 The Dark Ride – Helloween
- 2000 The Masquerade Ball – Axel Rudi Pell
- 2000 The Optimist – Eric Bazilian
- 2000 The Wizard's Chosen Few – Axel Rudi Pell
- 2000 Thirteen Tales from Urban Bohemia – The Dandy Warhols
- 2000 Wonder Bar – Martin Sexton
- 2001 Six Degrees of Inner Turbulence – Dream Theater
- 2001 Silver Side Up – Nickelback
- 2001 Arrival – Journey
- 2001 Back to Bogalusa – Clarence "Gatemouth" Brown
- 2001 Barricades & Brickwalls – Kasey Chambers
- 2001 Blueprint for a Sunrise – Yoko Ono
- 2001 Died Laughing – Mina Caputo
- 2001 Digimortal – Fear Factory
- 2001 Every Six Seconds – Saliva
- 2001 Here's Luck – The Honeydogs
- 2001 Hopeless Case of a Kid in Denial – The Hellacopters
- 2001 I Primi Anni – Giorgia
- 2001 I Tried to Rock You But You Only Roll – Leona Naess
- 2001 Just Another Phase – The Moffatts
- 2001 Just Push Play – Aerosmith
- 2001 Katy Hudson – Katy Hudson
- 2001 Live Metropolis, Pt. 2 – Dream Theater
- 2001 Love and Theft – Bob Dylan
- 2001 Making Enemies Is Good – Backyard Babies
- 2001 Pretty Together – Sloan
- 2001 That's What I Am – Eric Gales
- 2001 Vou Ser Feliz E Já Volto – Paulo Miklos
- 2001 Wake Up and Smell the Coffee – The Cranberries
- 2002 Beauty of the Rain – Dar Williams
- 2002 Central Park Concert – Dave Matthews Band
- 2002 Welcome Interstate Managers – Fountains of Wayne
- 2002 A Rush of Blood to the Head – Coldplay
- 2002 1000 Kisses – Patty Griffin
- 2002 A New Day at Midnight – David Gray
- 2002 Away from the Sun – 3 Doors Down
- 2002 Blue Wild Angel: Live at the Isle of Wight – Jimi Hendrix
- 2002 Bounce – Bon Jovi
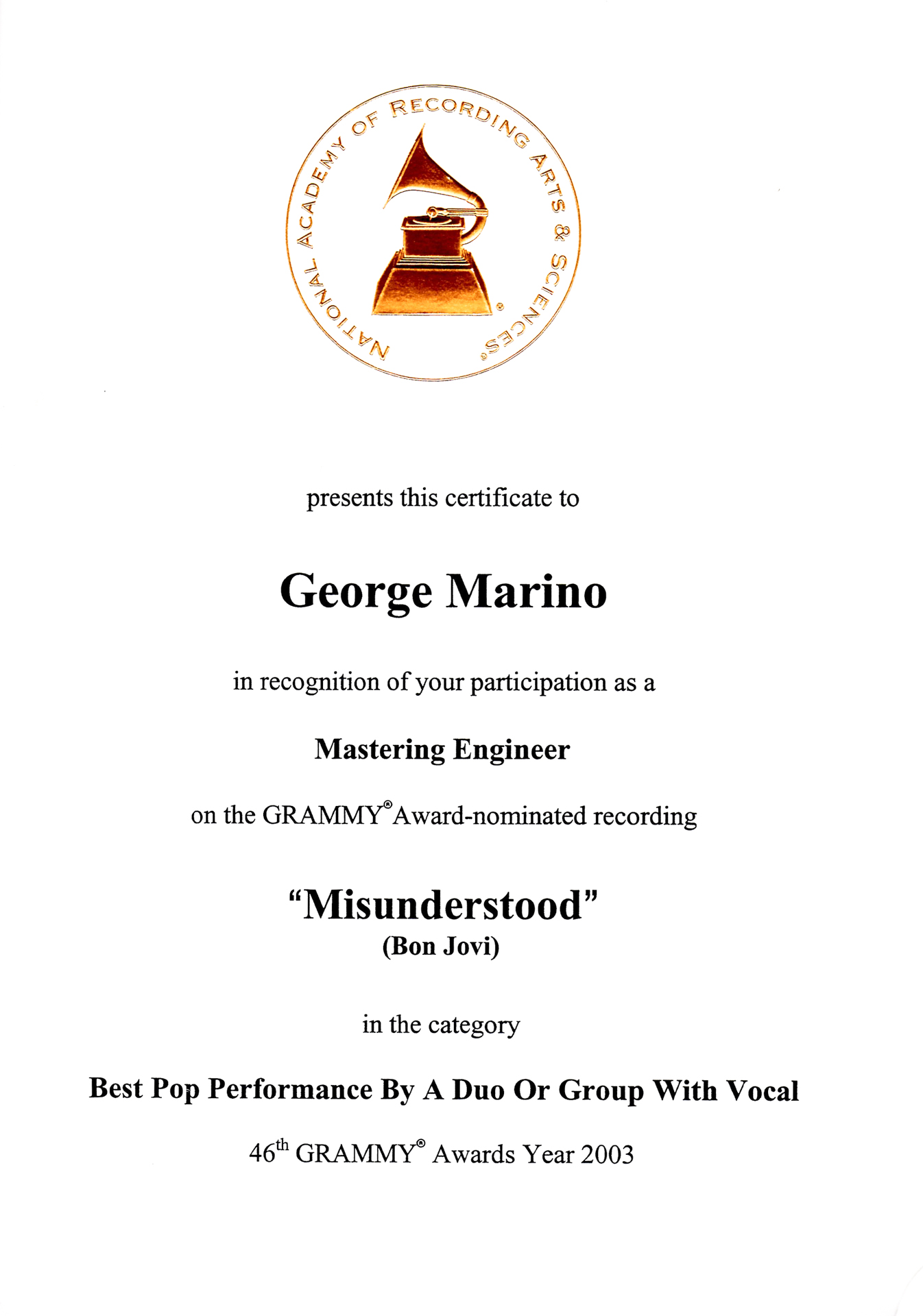
  2003 Grammy Certificate for "Misunderstood" – Bon Jovi
- 2002 Century Spring – Mason Jennings
- 2002 Cheer Up! – Reel Big Fish
- 2002 Cobblestone Runway – Ron Sexsmith
- 2002 Deep Shadows and Brilliant Highlights - H.I.M.
- 2002 Degradation Trip – Jerry Cantrell
- 2002 Did Anyone Approach You – a-ha
- 2002 Elv1s: 30#1 Hits – Elvis Presley
- 2002 Final Days: Anthems for the Apocalypse- Plasmatics
- 2002 Gravity – Our Lady Peace
- 2002 High Visibility – The Hellacopters
- 2002 L'Eccezione – Carmen Consoli
- 2002 No Pads, No Helmets ... Just Balls – Simple Plan
- 2002 Paradize – Indochine
- 2002 Six Degrees of Inner Turbulence – Dream Theater
- 2002 Superkala – Course of Nature
- 2002 Take a Deep Breath – Brighton Rock
- 2002 The Promise Highway – Mark Cook
- 2002 Theory of a Deadman – Theory of a Deadman
- 2002 Under a Pale Grey Sky – Sepultura
- 2003 Live at the Beacon Theater – The Allman Brothers
- 2003 We are Not Alone – Breaking Benjamin
- 2003 Action Pact – Sloan
- 2003 Beautiful Lumps of Coal – Plumb
- 2003 Buried Alive by Love – H.I.M.
- 2003 Dead Generation – Sloth
- 2003 Dead Letters – The Rasmus
- 2003 Departure – Carla Werner
- 2003 Escape from Cape Coma – Twisted Method
- 2003 Frengers – Mew
- 2003 Giving the Devil His Due – Coal Chamber
- 2003 Hatefiles – Fear Factory
- 2003 Hellalive – Machine Head
- 2003 How Can I Sleep with Your Voice in My Head – a-ha
- 2003 How the West Was Won – Led Zeppelin
- 2003 Life Is Killing Me – Type O Negative
- 2003 Live at Berkeley: 2nd Show – Jimi Hendrix
- 2003 Lo Que Te Conté Mientras Te Hacías la Dormida – La Oreja de Van Gogh
- 2003 Love Metal – H.I.M.
- 2003 Matches & Gasoline – Chacon
- 2003 Rock the Block – Krokus
- 2003 Sing Me Something New – David Fonseca
- 2003 The Beauty of the Rain – Dar Williams
- 2003 The Deepest End, Live in Concert – Gov't Mule
- 2003 The Long Road – Nickelback
- 2003 The Rise of Brutality – Hatebreed
- 2003 This Left Feels Right – Bon Jovi
- 2003 Three Days Grace – Three Days Grace
- 2003 We Used to Be Friends – The Dandy Warhols
- 2003 We've Come for You All – Anthrax
- 2003 Welcome Interstate Managers – Fountains of Wayne
- 2003 Where You Are – Socialburn
- 2003 Yellow Blues – Rollins Band
- 2004 Octavarium – Dream Theater
- 2004 Sixty Six Steps – Leo Kottke & Mike Gordon
- 2004 100,000,000 Bon Jovi Fans Can't Be Wrong – Bon Jovi
- 2004 Because I Can – Katy Rose
- 2004 Circus – Circus
- 2004 Contraband – Velvet Revolver
- 2004 Is There Love in Space? – Joe Satriani
- 2004 Light of the Moon – The Pierces
- 2004 Live from Earth/Wide Awake in Dreamland – Pat Benatar
- 2004 Live from the Gypsy Road – Cinderella
- 2004 Moonlight Survived – Moments in Grace
- 2004 One Team One Spirit – Gotthard
- 2004 Part of You – Eric Gale
- 2004 Penny & Me – Hanson
- 2004 Retriever – Ron Sexsmith
- 2004 Scream & Whisper – Edwin McCain
- 2004 Seven Wiser – Seven Wiser
- 2004 Some Kind of Monster – Metallica
- 2004 Still Not Getting Any... – Simple Plan
- 2004 Stolen Car (Take Me Dancing) – Sting
- 2004 The Battle for Everything – Five for Fighting
- 2004 The Experience Sessions – Noel Redding
- 2004 The Hard Way – Owsley
- 2004 Tyrannosaurus Hives – The Hives
- 2004 Underneath – Hanson
- 2004 We Are Not Alone – Breaking Benjamin
- 2005 Whatever People Say I Am, That's What I'm Not – Arctic Monkeys
- 2005 World Container – The Tragically Hip
- 2005 Analogue – a-ha
- 2005 And the Glass Handed Kites – Mew
- 2005 Extreme Behavior – Hinder
- 2005 Celice – a-ha
- 2005 Choose Love – Ringo Starr
- 2005 Crazy – Simple Plan
- 2005 Have a Nice Day – Bon Jovi
- 2005 Healthy in Paranoid Times – Our Lady Peace
- 2005 Hedley – Hedley
- 2005 Here I Am – Marion Raven
- 2005 In the Clear – Ivy
- 2005 Juturna – Circa Survive
- 2005 L' Heure d'Été – Marc Lavoine
- 2005 L' Uomo Sogna Di Volare – Negrita
- 2005 Let There Be Morning – The Perishers
- 2005 Live Letters – The Rasmus
- 2005 Livin' in the City – Fun Lovin' Criminals
- 2005 Mi Corazon – Fun Lovin' Criminals
- 2005 Tripping The Velvet - Annie Minogue Band
- 2005 Nahaufnahme – Westernhagen
- 2005 Nexterday – Ric Ocasek
- 2005 Out of Nothing – Embrace
- 2005 Out-of-State Plates – Fountains of Wayne
- 2005 Perception – Blessid Union of Souls
- 2005 Prince of Darkness – Ozzy Osbourne
- 2005 Red, White & Crüe – Mötley Crüe
- 2005 The Art of Breaking – Thousand Foot Krutch
- 2005 Seventeen Days – 3 Doors Down
- 2005 Super Extra Gravity – The Cardigans
- 2005 Superbeautifulmonster – Bif Naked
- 2005 The Body Acoustic – Cyndi Lauper
- 2005 The City Sleeps in Flames - Scary Kids Scaring Kids
- 2005 The High Speed Scene – High Speed Scene
- 2005 Under Cover – Ozzy Osbourne
- 2005 Wings – Skylark
- 2005 The World Can Wait – 67 Special
- 2005 X&Y – Coldplay
- 2006 A Decade – Our Lady Peace
- 2006 A Thousand Different Ways – Clay Aiken
- 2006 Analogue (All I Want) – a-ha
- 2006 Awake – Josh Groban
- 2006 Boys Like Girls – Boys Like Girls
- 2006 Can't Catch Tomorrow (Good Shoes Won't Save You This Time) – Lostprophets
- 2006 Chariot – Gavin DeGraw
- 2006 Citizen X – Palumbo
- 2006 Dante XXI – Sepultura
- 2006 Dead FM – Strike Anywhere
- 2006 Empire – Kasabian
- 2006 For the Taken – Mercy Fall
- 2006 Hold the Fire – Tommy James
- 2006 Holding My Breath – Mike Willis
- 2006 Homo Sapiens – The Cooper Temple Clause
- 2006 Horny as a Dandy – The Dandy Warhols
- 2006 In a Million Pieces – The Draft
- 2006 Into the Harbour – Southside Johnny
- 2006 JB50 – Jimmy Barnes
- 2006 Keep Your Heart – The Loved Ones
- 2006 Liberation Transmission – Lostprophets
- 2006 Like Cold Rain Kills a Summer Day – Janez Detd.
- 2006 Make This Your Own – The Cooper Temple Clause
- 2006 Minutes to Miles – Crash Romeo
- 2006 No Balance Palace – Kashmir
- 2006 One World – The Feelers
- 2006 Say I Am You – The Weepies
- 2006 Stand – Michael W. Smith
- 2006 Super Colossal – Joe Satriani
- 2006 The Mother, the Mechanic, and the Path – The Early November
- 2006 World Container – The Tragically Hip
- 2007 The Foundation – Zac Brown Band
- 2007 Overcome – All That Remains
- 2007 Blood Brothers – Rose Tattoo
- 2007 Djin Djin – Angélique Kidjo
- 2007 Favourite Worst Nightmare – Arctic Monkeys
- 2007 Freedom's Road – John Mellencamp
- 2007 Here & Now – America
- 2007 Lez Zeppelin – Lez Zeppelin
- 2007 Live at Monterey – The Jimi Hendrix Experience
- 2007 Ringo Starr: Live at Soundstage – Ringo Starr
- 2007 Lost Highway – Bon Jovi
- 2007 On Letting Go – Circa Survive
- 2007 One for All – Peter Criss
- 2007 Plug Me In – AC/DC
- 2007 The Shade of Poison Trees – Dashboard Confessional
- 2007 These Things Move in Threes – Mumm-Ra
- 2007 Time Stand Still – The Hooters
- 2007 Traffic and Weather – Fountains of Wayne
- 2007 Yes, I'm a Witch – Yoko Ono
- 2008 3 Doors Down – 3 Doors Down
- 2008 A Fondness for Hometown Scars – Mina Caputo
- 2008 Alive: The Millennium Concert – Kiss
- 2008 Black Ice – AC/DC
- 2008 Bring Ya to the Brink – Cyndi Lauper
- 2008 Cien Noches (One Hundred Nights at the Cafe) – Ben Sidran
- 2008 Cinderella: Live in Concert – Cinderella
- 2008 Hideaway – The Weepies
- 2008 Horror Wrestling – Drain
- 2008 How to Be a Megastar Live! – Blue Man Group
- 2008 I Love Christmas – Tommy James
- 2008 I, Lucifer – Destroy the Runner
- 2008 Little Wild One – Joan Osborne
- 2008 Live at Berkeley – The Jimi Hendrix Experience
- 2008 Lucky – Nada Surf
- 2008 Monday's Ghost – Sophie Hunger
- 2008 No, Virginia... – The Dresden Dolls
- 2008 Real Animal – Alejandro Escovedo
- 2008 Revelation – Journey
- 2008 Rise and Fall, Rage and Grace – The Offspring
- 2008 Scream Aim Fire – Bullet for My Valentine
- 2008 Surfing with the Alien/Is There Love in Space? – Joe Satriani
- 2008 Symphony – Sarah Brightman
- 2008 The Foundation – Zac Brown Band
- 2009 The Suburbs – Arcade Fire
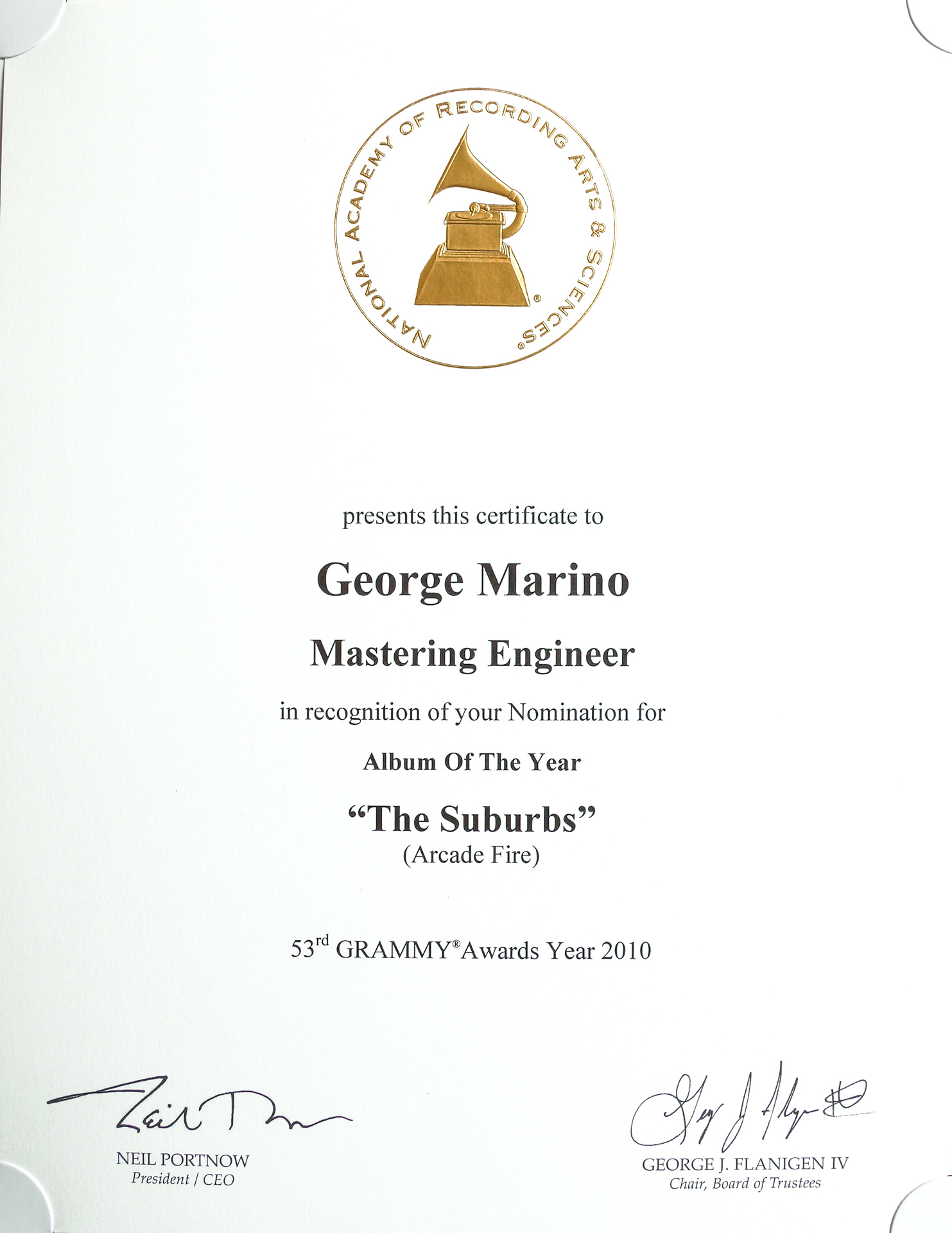
  2010 Arcade Fire Album of the Year Grammy Nomination Certificate for "The Suburbs"
- 2009 The Circle – Bon Jovi
- 2009 Adelitas Way – Adelitas Way
- 2009 Already Free – The Derek Trucks Band
- 2009 Both Sides Live – The Hooters
- 2009 Celebración de la Ciudad Natal – My Morning Jacket
- 2009 Crazy Love – Michael Bublé* 2009 Dylan Different – Ben Sidran
- 2009 Live in Paris & Ottawa 1968 [CD/LP] – The Jimi Hendrix Experience
- 2009 Live Blues in Red Square – Wolf Mail
- 2009 Live at Madison Square Garden – Bon Jovi
- 2009 Moving Forward – Bernie Williams
- 2009 War Is the Answer – Five Finger Death Punch
- 2009 We Are the Same – The Tragically Hip
- 2010 Be My Thrill – The Weepies
- 2010 Black Swans and Wormhole Wizards – Joe Satriani
- 2010 Dark Is the Way, Light Is a Place – Anberlin
- 2010 Everyday Demons – The Answer
- 2010 Hammer of the North – Grand Magus
- 2010 Hollywood: The Deluxe EP – Michael Bublé
- 2010 I Liked It Better When You Had No Heart – Butch Walker
- 2010 If I Had a Hi-Fi – Nada Surf
- 2010 Lez Zeppelin I – Lez Zeppelin
- 2010 Memphis Blues – Cyndi Lauper
- 2010 Order of the Black – Black Label Society
- 2010 Warren Haynes Presents: The Benefit Concert, Vol. 3 – Warren Haynes
- 2010 Dust Bowl – Joe Bonamassa
- 2011 The Song Remains Not the Same – Black Label Society
- 2011 Clocks'n'Clouds – Fauve
- 2011 Suck It and See – Arctic Monkeys
- 2011 Angles – The Strokes
- 2011 The Great God Pan – Spirits of the Dead
- 2011 Stranger Me – Amy LaVere
- 2011 Sky Full of Holes – Fountains of Wayne
- 2011 Long Player Late Bloomer – Ron Sexsmith
- 2011 If Not Now, When? – Incubus
- 2011 Winterland – Jimi Hendrix 4-CD set
- 2012 Live in New York City – Paul Simon

=== 5.1 Surround ===
- Bob Dylan's Blonde on Blonde, Love and Theft, Slow Train Coming, Bringing It All Back Home and Another Side of Bob Dylan
- Led Zeppelin – How the West Was Won

=== Soundtracks ===
- 2010 Iron Man 2 [Original Motion Picture Soundtrack] – AC/DC
- 2008 Mamma Mia! The Movie Soundtrack
- 2007 Music and Lyrics
- 2005 Wild Ocean [Bonus Track] John Hughes
- 2004 .hack//Sign: Original Soundtrack [Original Soundtrack]
- 2003 Freddy Vs. Jason – The Original Motion Picture Soundtrack – Roadrunner Records
- 2002 Resident Evil: Music From And Inspired By The Original Motion Picture – Roadrunner Records
- 2001 More Music from The Fast and the Furious
- 2001 Bridget Jones's Diary
- 2000 Gone in Sixty Seconds
- 1999 End of Days
- 1998 Armageddon
- 1996 Rent [Original Broadway Cast Recording] Original Broadway Cast
- 1996 The Crow: City of Angels ("Gold Dust Woman")
- 1996 Flirting with Disaster (Original Motion Picture Soundtrack)
- 1996 Barb Wire (Original Motion Picture Soundtrack)
- 1995 Smokey Joe's Cafe: The Songs of Leiber and Stoller Original Broadway Cast
- 1995 A Tale of Cinderella: New Musical for the Whole Family
- 1995 Hoop Dreams [Original Soundtrack] – Ben Sidran
- 1995 Interview with the Vampire – Elliot Goldenthal
- 1995 New York Rock [Original Cast] – Yoko Ono
- 1992 Home Alone 2: Lost in New York [Original Soundtrack]
- 1992 The Bodyguard [Original Motion Picture Soundtrack]
- 1990 Pretty Woman
- 1986 Labyrinth [From the Original Soundtrack of the Jim Henson Film] Trevor Jones
- 1985 St. Elmo's Fire
- 1982 Dreamgirls [Original Broadway Cast Album]
- 1980 Times Square – The Original Motion Picture Soundtrack
- 1978 Working [Original Cast Recording]

=== DVDs, Video Games and Television Specials ===
- 2012 Paul Simon – Live in New York City (DVD)
- 2009 John Lennon: Power to the People (DVD)
- 2009 Ninja Gaiden Sigma 2 (Video Game)
- 2009 Wolf Mail: Live Blues in Red Square (DVD)
- 2008 Jimi Hendrix: Live at Woodstock [Blu-ray]
- 2007 O.A.R.: Live From Madison Square Garden (DVD)
- 2006 Josh Groban: Awake (DVD)
- 2006 Whitesnake: Live in the Still of the Night [DVD]
- 2006 Andrea Bocelli: Amore Under the Desert Sky – Great Performances (TV Series)
- 2004 Simple Plan: Still Not Getting Any... (Video short)
- 2004 Ghost in the Shell [Sony PlayStation Soundtrack]
- 2003 Ringo Starr – Ringo Rama
- 2003 Martin Scorsese Presents the Blues: Jimi Hendrix
- 2003 Dave Matthews Band: The Central Park Concert (TV Special documentary)
- 2003 Led Zeppelin DVD (Video documentary)
- 2002 Nickelback: Live at Home (Video documentary)
- 2000 Jesus: The Epic Mini-Series [Original Television Soundtrack]
- 2000 Metallica With Michael Kamen Conducting San Francisco Symphony Orchestra
- 1999 Jimi Hendrix: Live at Woodstock (Video documentary)

=== Box Sets ===
Led Zeppelin, Metallica, AC/DC, Jimi Hendrix, Crimson Glory, Bon Jovi, Loverboy, John Lennon, CIV, Cheap Trick, Alice Cooper, Cyndi Lauper, Kiss, Patti Smith, Journey, Toto, The Cars, Tony Orlando and Dawn, Santana, Psychedelic Furs
