= Palumbo =

Palumbo is a surname of southern Italian origin, literally meaning "ring dove" or "wood pigeon". Notable people with the surname include:

- Alessio Palumbo (born 1985), Italian motorcycle racer
- Angy Palumbo (died 1960), Italian-British musician and composer
- Anthony Palumbo (born 1970), American Assembly member for the 2nd District of New York
- Antonio Palumbo (footballer) (born 1996) Italian footballer
- Carmine Palumbo (born 1993) Italian footballer
- Chuck Palumbo (born 1971), American professional wrestler
- Corey Palumbo (born 1972), American politician
- Curtio Palumbo (1622–??), Roman Catholic Titular Bishop of Margarita
- Daryl Palumbo (born 1979), American rock musician
- Dave Palumbo (born 1968), American bodybuilder
- Delegado Palumbo (born 1974), Brazilian politician
- Dolores Palumbo (1912–1984), Italian actress
- Donald Palumbo, American opera chorus master
- Enrique Loedel Palumbo (1901–1962), Uruguayan-Argentine physicist
- Francisco Minà Palumbo (1814–1899), Italian naturalist
- Frank Palumbo (1910–1983), American restaurateur and philanthropist from Philadelphia, Pennsylvania, USA
- Gene Palumbo (1945–2000), American television producer and writer
- Giuseppe Palumbo (cyclist) (born 1975), Italian bicycle racer
- James Palumbo, Baron Palumbo of Southwark (born 1963), British entrepreneur
- Jessielyn Palumbo, Miss New Jersey USA in 2016
- Joe Palumbo (American football) (1929–2013), American college football player
- Joe Palumbo (baseball) (born 1994), American professional baseball pitcher
- John Palumbo (born 1956), American businessman and motivational speaker
- Luigi Palumbo (born 1991), Italian footballer
- Mario Palumbo (1933–2004), American politician
- Nick Palumbo (born 1970), American film director and producer
- Onofrio Palumbo (1606–1650s), Italian painter of the Baroque period
- Peter Palumbo, Baron Palumbo (born 1935), British property developer
- Peter Palumbo (politician) (born 1961), American politician
- Rudolph Palumbo (1901–1987), British property developer of Second World War bombsites in London
- Ruth Ann Palumbo (born 1949), American politician from Kentucky
- Sam Palumbo (born 1932), former linebacker in the National Football League
- Thomas Palumbo (1950–2011), American politician
- Tom Palumbo (1921–2008), Italian-American photographer and film director
- Vincenzo Palumbo (born 1974), German footballer
- Vito Palumbo (born 1972), Italian composer

== See also ==
- Baron Palumbo
- Lord Palumbo
- Palomba
