= Siskin (disambiguation) =

Siskin is a name applied to several bird species.

Siskin may also refer to:

== Military ==
- Armstrong Whitworth Siskin, a British fighter aircraft
- HMS Siskin, a former name of the shore establishment HMS Sultan
- USS Siskin (AMS-58), US naval ship

== Music ==
- Siskin (band), a UK indie-pop band
- Skew Siskin, a German hard rock band
  - Skew Siskin (album)

== Sport ==
- Siskins, a Canadian aerobatic flying team
- Stayner Siskins, a Canadian junior ice hockey team
- Waterloo Siskins, a Canadian junior ice hockey team
- Siskin (horse), a Thoroughbred racehorse

== Other uses ==
- Siskin Children's Institute, a non-profit educational organization in Tennessee, US
