= The Children's Institute (disambiguation) =

The Children's Institute is a school in Verona, New Jersey, United States, for children on the autism spectrum

(The) Children's Institute may also refer to:

- Children's Institute of Pittsburgh, a hospital in Pittsburgh, Pennsylvania, United States
- Children's Institute Inc., organisation supporting children in Los Angeles, California, United States
- Siskin Children's Institute, non-profit organisation for children with special needs in Chattanooga, Tennessee, United States
