= I Got Life =

I Got Life may refer to:

- "I Got Life", song from Hair (Original London Cast Recording)
- "I Got Life", song by Mercy Fall from For the Taken
- I Got Life!, a 2017 French drama film (original title Aurore)
