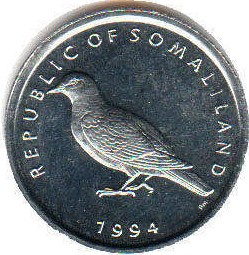
- One Somaliland shilling coin depicting the Somali pigeon

Conservation status
- Least Concern (IUCN 3.1)

Scientific classification
- Kingdom: Animalia
- Phylum: Chordata
- Class: Aves
- Order: Columbiformes
- Family: Columbidae
- Genus: Columba
- Species: C. oliviae

Binomial name
- Columba oliviae Clarke, 1918
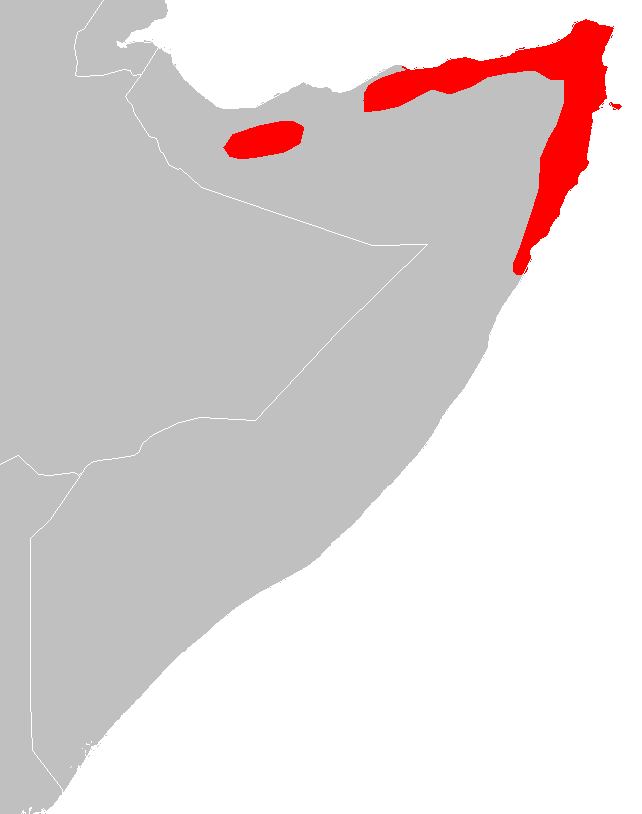
- Believed general range; Somali montane xeric woodlands

= Somali pigeon =

Species of bird

The Somali pigeon (Columba oliviae) or Somali stock dove is a species of bird in the family Columbidae. It is endemic to Somalia. The IUCN Redlist identified a possible threat to the species from the speckled pigeon (Columba guinea). C. oliviae is found mostly on the ground, where it often forages, most frequently in rock along arid coasts.

== Taxonomy ==
The Somali pigeon is placed in the Oenas sub-group within the genus Columba alongside the stock dove and yellow-eyed pigeon, based on their similar mauve heads and wing markings, but believed to be more closely related to the latter overall.

== Description ==
C. oliviae is a mid-sized pigeon with pale grey coloration, a mauve cap, yellow eyes and an iridescent collar with bronze-green tones. It has a bluish-gray rump, dark wing edges and dark bands along its tail; all of these features are most clearly seen in flight. Its range overlaps with that of the much darker and more densely spotted speckled pigeon, which is rapidly expanding into the Somali pigeon's territory. Unlike various species of collared doves with which its range overlaps, it lacks a characteristic dark band on the hind-neck. It may also be confused with feral pigeons (C. livia), but the Somali pigeon is smaller and less dark than C. livia.

=== Vocalizations ===
As with many other aspects of the species, the Somali pigeon's vocalizations are not well known, but have described as a "wuk-wuk-wuk-ooooh". It also produces other pigeon-like noises, including cooing sounds.

== Distribution and habitat ==
The exact distribution is unclear, but its range encompasses much of northeast Somalia, especially along the coast, including both the country proper and the unrecognized state of Somaliland. It is non-migratory. It is a mostly ground-dwelling bird, found in arid, coastal environments, especially on cliffs and hills, usually found in areas with little vegetation. It is typically seen at altitudes of 75 metres (246 ft) to 750 metres (2,460 ft), but has been recorded as high as 1,425 metres (4,675 ft).

== Behavior and ecology ==
The Somali pigeon's range overlaps with that of other doves, including the speckled pigeon. While uncommon, it can be found in pairs or small flocks. It is often seen feeding on the ground, consuming seeds, cultivated grains and berries.

== Status ==
The exact population size and trend is unknown. However, there are no laws in effect to protect it and it is considered urgently in need of some type of population survey. It may also be experiencing competition from the rapidly expanding speckled pigeon, although further study is still needed to be certain. Plans to organize research on the species have been made.

As of February 2022, on eBird, a site that collects bird population data based on user-provided information, only six observations of the Somali pigeon have been made in over four hundred thousand checklists submitted throughout the African continent (and over sixty million worldwide).

== In culture ==
The bird is featured on the one shilling coin's obverse of the internationally unrecognized East African republic of Somaliland's official currency.
