= Academy 360 =

Academy 360 may refer to:

- Academy 360, Sunderland, a state-funded school in Sunderland, Tyne and Wear, England
- Spectrum360 (also known as Academy 360), a private school in Verona, New Jersey, United States
- Also a school in Denver, Colorado District #1 in the Montbello community.
