= SS Badenia =

A number of steamships have carried the name Badenia, including:

- SS Badenia (1902), a cargo liner in service 1902–1921
- SS Badenia (1912), a coaster in service 1912–1939
