= The Beauty of Letting Go =

Studio album by Socialburn
- Released: October 25, 2005
- Genre: Post-grunge
- Length: 48:50
- Label: iRock Entertainment
- Producer: James Paul Wisner

Socialburn chronology
Where You Are (2003)	The Beauty of Letting Go (2005)

The Beauty of Letting Go is the fourth and final studio album released by American rock band Socialburn.

== Track listing ==
1. "Be a Man" – 4:13
2. "Touch the Sky" – 3:58
3. "Cold Night" – 4:19
4. "Get Out Alive" – 3:26
5. "Speak Now" – 4:21
6. "Ride" – 4:06
7. "Paranoid" – 3:07
8. "Leaving Song" – 4:24
9. "Who Cares" – 4:12
10. "Love Hate" – 3:45
11. "Out to Sea" – 4:31
12. "I'm Happy" – 4:32
