= The Devil May Care =

Studio album by 67 Special
- Released: 11 August 2007
- Recorded: September 2006
- Genre: rock
- Length: 42:06
- Label: Warner Music
- Producer: Jacquire King

67 Special chronology
The World Can Wait (2005)	The Devil May Care (2007)

Professional ratings
Review scores
Source	Rating
Xdafied.com.au	4/5 stars

The Devil May Care is the second full-length album by Melbourne-based rock music group 67 Special. The album was released in Australia on Saturday 11 August 2007.

It was recorded at Mangrove Studios in New South Wales with American producer and engineer Jacquire King. The band has said they tried to keep things as simple as possible for this album.

== Track listing ==
1. "Sold Your Little Sister for a Red Red Motor Car" – 2:57
2. "Killer Bees" – 2:26
3. "Lady Gin" – 2:48
4. "Shot at the Sun" – 3:29
5. "Songbird" – 3:24
6. "Patch Me Up" – 4:19
7. "So Help Us All" – 3:46
8. "Hard Kinda Talk" – 4:03
9. "Quickdraw" – 2:42
10. "Running From The Man" – 2:37
11. "Round & Round" – 3:38
12. "It's Not Like You" – 5:57
