= Lord Palumbo =

Lord Palumbo may refer to:

- Peter Palumbo, Baron Palumbo (born 1935), a British property developer, art collector, and former chairman of the Arts Council of Great Britain. He is the father of James Palumbo.
- James Palumbo, Baron Palumbo of Southwark (born 1963), a British entrepreneur, author, and co-founder of the Ministry of Sound nightclub. He is the son of Peter Palumbo.
