= Boys & Girls (67 Special EP) =

Single by 67 Special
- Released: 21 March 2005
- Studio: Melbourne
- Genre: Rock
- Length: 20:06
- Label: Festival Mushroom
- Producer(s): Andy Baldwin

67 Special singles chronology
"Hey There Bomb" (2004)	"Boys & Girls" (2005)	"Walking Away" (2005)

Boys & Girls is a five-track EP by Australian rock music group 67 Special, released in March 2005 (see 2005 in music). "Boys & Girls" reached No. 6 on the ARIA Hitseekers Singles Chart.

The group's bass guitarist, Bryan Dochstader, was interviewed by an Access All Areas.com.au's correspondent ahead of their debut album, The World Can Wait (August 2005). Dochstader explained why Boys & Girls was issued, "we had this album done before that and we did some b-sides in anticipation of releasing singles but we tend to shy away from singles so we kind of wanted to bundle these up and release it as a pre-album teaser so I guess that EP also served that purpose – each had their own little place to building up to this album."

== Reception ==
Professional ratings
Review scores
Source	Rating
fasterlouder.com.au	(favourable) link

== Track listing ==
All tracks are written by Gavin Campbell, Ben Dexter, Bryan Dochstader, Louis Macklin, Ash Santilla

Boys & Girls Festival Mushroom Records (FMR 022052)
No.	Title	Length
1.	"Boys and Girls"	2:57
2.	"Pretty Mess"	3:28
3.	"Good Enough"	3:26
4.	"Zipper"	4:17
5.	"Leave You"	5:55
