= Babes on Broadway (album) =

Studio album by Artful Dodger
- Released: 1977
- Genre: Hard rock
- Label: Columbia
- Producer: Eddie Leonetti

Artful Dodger chronology
Honor Among Thieves (1976)	Babes on Broadway (1977)	Rave On (1980)

Babes on Broadway is the third album by the American band Artful Dodger, released in 1977. They supported it with a North American tour. The band was dropped by Columbia Records in 1978.

== Production ==
The album was produced by Eddie Leonetti and executive produced by Jack Douglas, who had helped to produce Artful Dodger's previous album, Honor Among Thieves. Dick Wagner played guitar on "Who in the World"; Derek St. Holmes played lead on "Idi Amin Stomp". Steven Tyler sang on "Alright". "C'mon Everybody" is a cover of the Eddie Cochran song.

== Critical reception ==
Professional ratings
Review scores
Source	Rating
AllMusic	2/5 stars
Robert Christgau	C+
The Collector's Guide to Heavy Metal	7/10
The New Rolling Stone Record Guide	2/5 stars

The Pittsburgh Press noted that "there's a thinness to the whole disc". The Plain Dealer said that Artful Dodger "lost its unaffectedness and warmth and declined into just one more hard rock purveyor". The Detroit Free Press called Babes on Broadway "a finely crafted rock and roll album with everything from hard rock to soft romance". Robert Christgau wrote that the music "isn't power pop any more—sounds almost like Angel, or Queen... Sounds pretty desperate, too."

MusicHound Rock: The Essential Album Guide called the album the band's "least essential", noting that it was "done in by too much plodding material". The New Rolling Stone Record Guide stated that Artful Dodger, "desperate for an audience ... resorted to formula."

== Track listing ==
Side 1

1. "Can't Stop Pretending"
2. "Alright"
3. "Who in the World"
4. "Wave Bye-Bye"
5. "All I Need"

Side 2

1. "Babes on Broadway"
2. "Mistake"
3. "Loretta"
4. "Idi Amin Stomp"
5. "C'mon Everybody"
