= Baron Palumbo =

Baron Palumbo may refer to:

- Peter Palumbo, Baron Palumbo,(born 1935), British property developer, art collector, and former chairman of the Arts Council of Great Britain
- James Palumbo, Baron Palumbo of Southwark, (born 1963), British entrepreneur, author, and co-founder of the Ministry of Sound nightclub
