= Hey There Bomb =

Single by 67 Special
- Released: August 2004
- Recorded: December 2003 to January 2004
- Genre: Rock
- Length: 3:20
- Label: Festival Mushroom Records
- Producer(s): Andy Baldwin

67 Special singles chronology
"Hey There Bomb" (2004)	"Boys & Girls" (2005)

Professional ratings
Review scores
Source	Rating
fasterlouder.com.au	(favourable)
xpressmag.com.au	(favourable)

Hey There Bomb is the a song and debut single by Melbourne rock music group 67 Special, released in 2004. The song peaked at number 100 on the ARIA charts.

== Track listing ==
CD single (02180-2)

1. "Hey There Bomb" – 3:40
2. "Lost That" – 2:20
3. "Last Drag" – 2:56
4. "Princess Pie" – 2:57
5. "Curious Mind" – 5:05

== Charts ==
Chart (2004)	Peak position
Australia (ARIA)	100
