= 67 Special =

Australian rock band

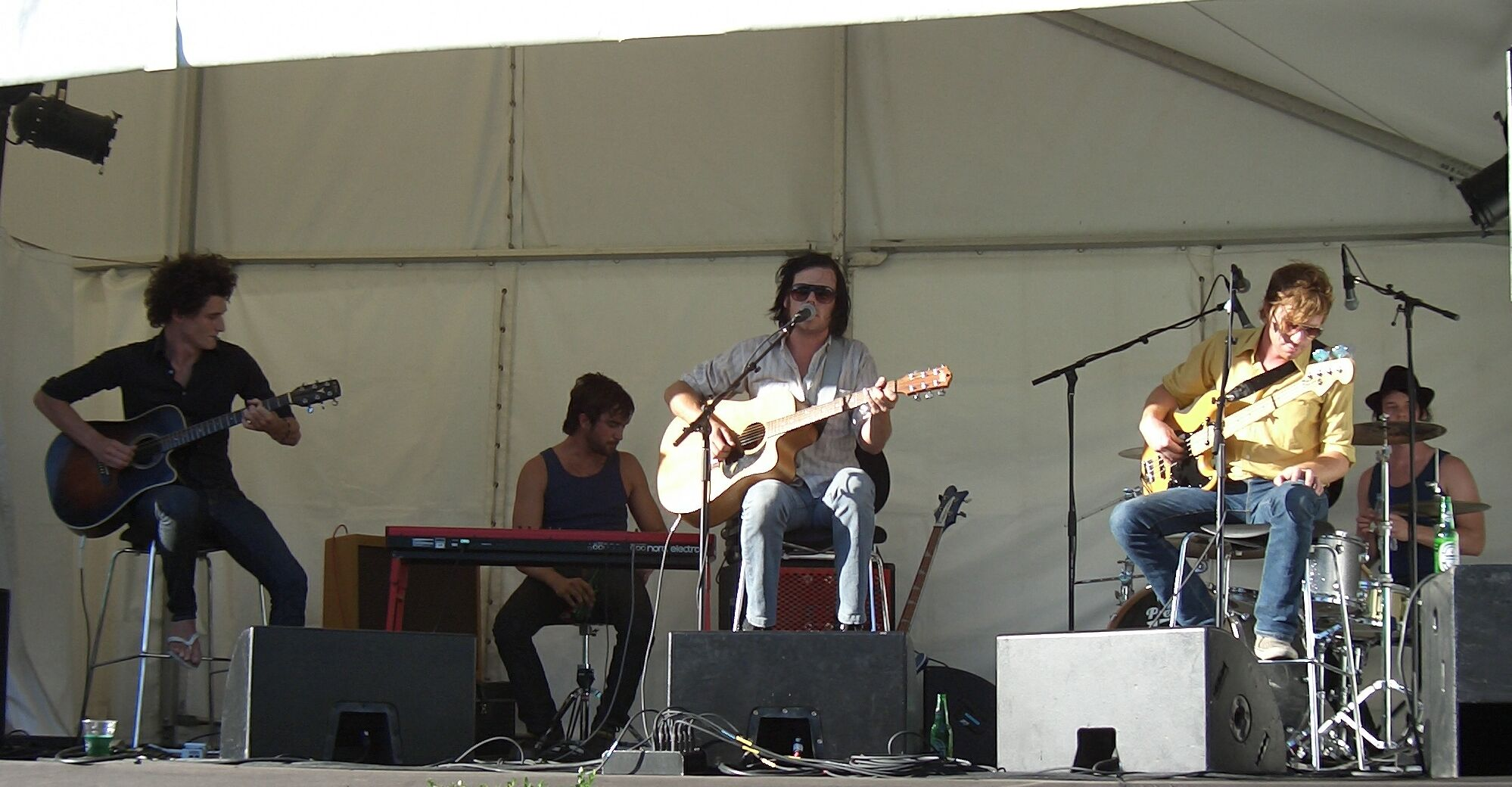

Background information
- Origin: Melbourne, Victoria, Australia
- Genre: Rock
- Years active: 2001–present
- Label: Warner Music Australasia
- Members: Ash Santilla; Gavin Campbell; Bryan Dochstader; Ben Dexter; Louis Macklin
- Website: Official website

67 Special are an Australian rock band based in Melbourne, Australia. The band was formed in 2001, and went on to release two full-length albums.

== History ==
In 1994, Ash Santilla and Gavin Campbell (Note: Note to be confused with Gavin Campbell (music producer).) met at high school in their hometown of Benalla, Victoria, and became good friends, bonding over their shared passion for rock music. Their first band was named Naybious, inspired by Gavin's sister Lauren's one-eyed doll.

Lead vocalist Santilla and lead guitarist Campbell met multi-instrumentalist Louis Macklin at a school camp, and he became the band's keyboardist and percussionist. Progress of the band stalled for some time, until 2001 when Santilla and Campbell found each other again in Melbourne and began writing again. Soon, drummer Ben Dexter joined after coming to know the group through his brother, and bass guitarist Bryan Dochstader joined the group after noticing the group unloading gear in a supermarket car-park and asking them, "Do you guys need a bass player?"

The band couldn't decide on a name for several months until Dexter rang Santilla and asked him, "What's the model of your car?" "HR," Santilla replied. "What year?" "'67." "67 Special?" "Yeah."

67 Special signed with Festival Mushroom Records released the "Hey There Bomb" in 2004. The song peaked at number 100 on the ARIA Charts. Their debut album The World Can Wait was released in August 2005.

The second studio album was released by Warner Music Australia in 2007.

== Personnel ==
- Ash Santilla – lead vocals, guitar
- Gavin Campbell – lead guitar
- Bryan Dochstader – bass guitar, vocals
- Ben Dexter – drums
- Louis Macklin – keyboards, percussion

== Discography ==
=== Albums ===
List of albums, with selected chart positions
Title	Album details	Peak chart positions
Title	Album details	AUS
The World Can Wait	Released: August 2005; Format: CD; Label: Festival Mushroom Records (338942)	83
The Devil May Care	Released: August 2007; Format: CD; Label: Warner Music Australia (5144218692)	—

=== Singles ===
List of singles, with selected chart positions
Title	Year	Chart positions	Album
Title	Year	AUS	Album
"Hey There Bomb"	2004	100	non album single
"Boys & Girls"	2005	—	The World Can Wait
"Walking Away"	2005	54	The World Can Wait
"Killer Bees"	2007	—	The Devil May Care
