= Mercy Fall =

Rock band

- Origin: Flagstaff, Arizona
- Genres: Rock
- Years active: 2002–2008
- Label: Atlantic
- Past members: Nate Stone; Jeff Lusby; Kieran Smiley; Ethan Rea; John Scillieri
- Website: www.mercyfall.com

Mercy Fall were an American rock band from Flagstaff, Arizona, active from 2002 to 2008. They released one album, For the Taken, in 2006. Members of the band have gone on to form the bands Corvo Radio and Citizen Media.

== History ==
After recording a series of demos, the band was signed to Atlantic Records in August 2004. After signing with Atlantic, they headed to Los Angeles, where they spent the spring of 2005 in the studio, with producer Howard Benson (My Chemical Romance, P.O.D.).

The band's debut album, For the Taken, was produced by Benson. The first single, "I Got Life", reached #36 on Billboard's Mainstream Rock chart. After the album's release, the band spent the summer of 2006 opening for Post-grunge act Seether on the Karma and Effect tour.

On December 12, 2007 it was announced that lead singer Nate Stone had left Mercy Fall to pursue folk music.

The remaining members of Mercy Fall went on to form the band Corvo Radio.

Members of Mercy Fall have come back together to form a new band, Citizen Media. Members are Nate Stone, Kieran Smiley, Jeff Lusby, and Michael Bielecki. It was announced the band had been in the studio working on an album called Transmission but the album has not been released as the band is in an unknown hiatus or breakup.

== Discography ==
Year	Album details
2006	For the Taken: Released: May 9, 2006; Label: Atlantic; Format:
