= Celice =

Celice is both a French surname (often Célice) and a feminine given name.

== Celice in popular culture ==
Norwegian band A-ha wrote a song entitled "Celice" for their 2005 album Analogue. Released as a single, the song was promoted by a series of remixes by Paul van Dyk and other mixers, as well as a controversial music video. The single went to no.1 in Norway and Belarus, and was a Top 40 hit in several other countries throughout Europe.
