= Wood pigeon =

Wood pigeon, wood-pigeon or woodpigeon may refer to:

== Birds ==
- Common wood pigeon (Columba palumbus), endemic to Europe and western Asia
- Other Columba species, such as:
  - Andaman wood pigeon (C. palumboides) of India's Andaman and Nicobar Islands
  - Ashy wood pigeon (C. pulchricollis) of South and Southeast Asia
  - Japanese wood pigeon (C. janthina) of East Asia
  - Nilgiri wood pigeon (C. elphinstonii) of southwestern India
  - Pale-capped pigeon (C. punicea) of South and Southeast Asia
  - Sri Lanka wood pigeon (C. torringtoniae)
  - Speckled wood pigeon (C. hodgsonii) of subtropical Asia
- Other pigeon species:
  - Kererū (Hemiphaga novaeseelandiae) of New Zealand
  - Wood doves (Turtur) of sub-Saharan Africa

== Arts and entertainment ==
- Wood Pigeon (film), a 1970 Iranian drama film
- Woodpigeon (band), a Canadian indie-pop collective
