= Delegado Palumbo =

Brazilian politician (born 1974)

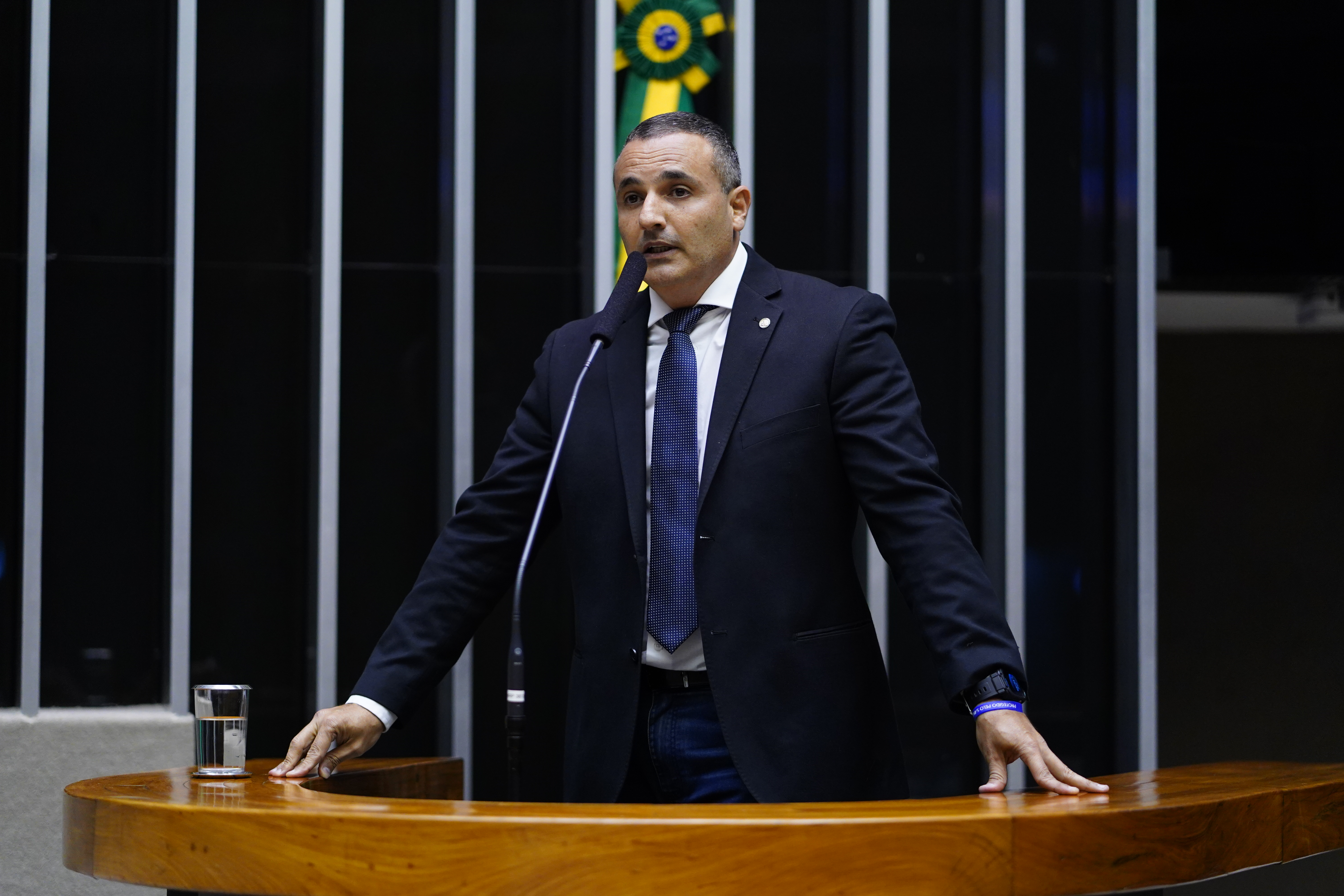
- Palumbo in 2023

Member of the Chamber of Deputies
- Incumbent
- Assumed office 1 February 2023
- Constituency: São Paulo

Personal details
- Born: 16 August 1974 (age 51)
- Party: Brazilian Democratic Movement (since 2020)

Mario Palumbo Junior, better known as Delegado Palumbo (born 16 August 1974), is a Brazilian politician serving as a member of the Chamber of Deputies since 2023. From 2021 to 2023, he was a member of the Municipal Chamber of São Paulo.
