= Artful Dodger (American band) =

American power pop/rock band

- Origin: Fairfax, Virginia, U.S.
- Genres: Rock, power pop
- Years active: 1973–1982; 1991; 2005–present
- Labels: Columbia, Ariola, Red Rooster
- Members: Steve Brigida; Steve Cooper; Gary Herrewig; Billy Paliselli; Peter Bonta
- Past members: Robb Michael Inglis; Gary Cox

Artful Dodger is an American rock band formed in Fairfax, Virginia in 1973, noted for their rock compositions, quick lyrics and vocal harmonies. The group was heavily influenced by the Beatles, Faces, and the Rolling Stones and drew frequent comparisons to the Raspberries. Artful Dodger's studio releases received high critical praise, but the band was unable to penetrate the charts.

== History ==
The band was originally called "Brat". Original members were Gary Herrewig (guitar), Billy Paliselli (vocals), Gary Cox (guitar and vocals), Robb Michael Inglis (bass) and Steve Brigida (drums). Inglis left the band in 1974 and was replaced by Steve Cooper. Inglis's bass tracks are featured on "Not Quite Right", the original 45 release B-side "Long Time Away", and the first album release of "New York City".

"Long Time Away" was re-recorded for their first album with an increased tempo and more pop feeling. Gary Cox traveled with a demo tape to New York City received an offer from the Leber-Krebs management firm. They were signed to Columbia Records and paired with producer Jack Douglas. The band had to choose a new name, as there was already another band named Brat. Artful Dodger released their self-titled debut album in September 1975.

The next album, Honor Among Thieves (1976), co-produced by Douglas and Eddie Leonetti, featured the power ballad "Scream" as the single. This album was not as successful as the first. During the summer of 1976 the band opened for Kiss. Their next album, Babes on Broadway (1977), also did not sell well, and Cox left the band. He was replaced by Peter Bonta on piano and guitar and they signed to Ariola Records in 1980.

The band broke up after the departure of Billy Paliselli in 1982. Steve Cooper and Steve Brigida partnered with Washington DC guitarist/vocalist/songwriter Jeff Smith and continue to record and play live with Smith as the Band of Steves. Peter Bonta opened his own recording studio, Wally Cleaver's, located in northern Virginia. He produced, engineered and played on solo projects for Gary Herrewig (the unreleased Four Gone Conclusions), Billy Paliselli and Gary Cox (a set of country demos shopped unsuccessfully to Nashville). Bonta also found steady work recording and touring with Mary Chapin Carpenter.

In 1991, Artful Dodger played two reunion shows in Cleveland, Ohio for the Cleveland Agora's 25th anniversary and appeared at the Legends of Rock Reunion 1991 event held in Parkman, Ohio. Sony issued Honor Among Thieves on CD in the 1990s, and the first two LPs were reissued on CD by Pendulum Entertainment Group in 1997. In 2008, American Beat Records re-issued Honor Among Thieves. In 2017, Real Gone Music issued a 2-CD set The Complete Columbia Recordings, making the Babes on Broadway album available on CD for the first time. Rave On has not yet been released on CD.

Due in large part to a resurgence of fan interest on the internet, Artful Dodger reunited to kick off a year-long series of "flashback" concerts to celebrate the Cleveland Agora's 40th anniversary. This reunion show occurred on December 31, 2005. The band returned to the Agora for a show on April 1, 2006 and played at the annual Taste of Cleveland event on September 2, 2006. The band last performed on May 3, 2008, once again at the Cleveland Agora.

The band continues to practice together and interacts with fans on the internet. Their performance at the Cleveland Agora on November 21, 2009 was recorded live to multi-track by Lava Room Recording.

Former guitarist Gary Cox (born Gary Steven Cox in Arlington, Virginia on January 17, 1953) died in Bristow, Virginia on August 12, 2012, at age 59.

== Band members ==
=== Current ===
- Steve Brigida – percussion (1973–1982, 1991, 2005–present)
- Steve Cooper – bass (1974–1982, 1991, 2005–present)
- Gary Herrewig – lead and rhythm guitars (1973–1982, 1991, 2005–present)
- Billy Paliselli – lead vocals, harmonica (1973–1982, 1991, 2005–present)
- Peter Bonta – keyboards, guitars (1979–1982, 1991, 2005–present)

=== Former ===
- Gary Cox – lead and rhythm guitars (1973–1980, 1991, 2005–2012; his death)
- Robb Michael Inglis – bass guitar (1973–1974)

== Discography ==
=== Studio albums ===
- Artful Dodger (1975)
- Honor Among Thieves (1976)
- Babes on Broadway (1977)
- Rave On (1980)

=== Singles ===
- 1975: "Silver and Gold"
- 1975: "Think Think"
- 1976: "Scream"
- 1977: "Can't Stop Pretending"
- 1980: "She's Just My Baby"
- 1980: "A Girl (La La La)" (#59 in Australia, 1 June 1981)
