= Annie Minogue =

- Genres: Rock; Pop
- Occupations: Singer-Songwriter; Philanthropist; Activist
- Instruments: Vocals; Piano; Guitar
- Labels: Varese Sarabande/Fontana Universal; SPV; Nippon Crown Wolf Entertainment Group
- Formerly of: Ghost of a God

Annie Minogue is an American singer, songwriter, and musician originally from New York City, best known as the lead vocalist and frontwoman of the Annie Minogue Band (AMB). She blends rock, pop, and blues influences in her music and has received recognition from music press and industry awards.

== Early life and education ==
Minogue grew up in New York in a musical family. Her father, Dennis Minogue (Terry Cashman), is a songwriter, producer, and recording artist. She has studied piano, guitar and voice and is a graduate of the High School of Music & Art in New York, and Berklee College of Music.

== Career ==
In the late 1990s, Minogue formed the Annie Minogue Band in New York City, after leaving her previous band Ghost of a God which gained record contracts with SPV Records in Germany and Nippon Crown in Japan.

=== Recordings ===
The group's debut albums, Home (1999) and Love Parade (2002), helped Minogue find her voice as a songwriter, laying the foundation for their follow up album Tripping the Velvet (2006), released by music label, Varèse Sarabande.

In 2021, The band's single "Sandbox" gained success during a label deal with Germany's Wolf Entertainment Group, reaching No. 1 on the World Indie Chart and No. 2 in Europe.

In 2024, Minogue and her band won an InterContinental Music Award in the Rock category for their music. In the same year, the band released the single "NOW!", that went on to receive a People’s Silver Telly Award. "NOW!" also reached No. 1 on the World Indie and European charts.

=== Touring and performances ===
The band has performed at festivals and venues across the United States, including Maplewoodstock in New Jersey, Summerfest, Sturgis Motorcycle Rally, Texas State Fair and Bethel Woods Center For The Arts. Some of the acts they have opened for include: The Smithereens, Blues Traveler, David Lee Roth, Dave Navarro, Black Eyed Peas, and Soul Asylum.

=== Media placements ===
Tracks by Minogue and her band have been licensed for television shows such as Dawson's Creek, MTV's Real World, Strong Medicine, and have been broadcast on CW, Lifetime, Sony Television, and network channels, as well as independent films.

=== Recognition ===
Minogue has been recognized for various awards, including:

| The Southbay Music Awards | Female vocalist of the year | 2005 |
| Marquis Who's Who | Top Professional Artist | 2023 |
| FPCM Award | Best Original Female Voice (all genres) | 2024 |
| WoMELLE Female Voice Awards | Advocate For Change Through Music Award | 2025 |
| Impact Leadership Award | Best Female Singer/Musician | 2025 |

Annie co-creates and produces the "Fair Play" concert series, a testament to her belief in music as a force for change, which aided the Bronx Immigration Partnership in 2019 and 2020 and supported Her Justice in 2025.
