= Socialburn =

American rock band

- Origin: Blountstown, Florida, United States
- Genres: Post-grunge
- Years active: 2000–2007
- Labels: Elektra Records iRock Entertainment
- Past members: Neil Alday; Dusty Price; Chris Cobb; Syrus Peters; Brandon Bittner

Socialburn was a four-piece American post-grunge band from Blountstown, Florida. Formed in 2000, the band released two independent albums, What a Beautiful Waste and World Outside, before being signed to Elektra Records in 2002. The band's major record label debut, Where You Are, was released in 2003, and spawned two charting singles, "Down" and "Everyone". The band was dropped by Elektra in the wake of its parent company Time Warner's merger with AOL, but released a follow-up, The Beauty of Letting Go, on smaller label "iRock Entertainment" in 2005. After touring in support of the album, the band disbanded in late 2007.

== History ==
The band played at TK101's Company Christmas Party at Big Daddy's in Foley, Alabama, December 2002, with TRUSTcompany, prior to their first album being released. The first major label album from Socialburn, Where You Are, on Elektra Records, was released in February 2003 and spawned two modern-rock radio hits: "Down" and "Everyone", which reached the top 10 and top 25 US charts respectively. The album has gone on to sell over 100,000 copies to date. The "Down", music video for this song was featured on MTV2 and Fuse TV in 2003 while "Everyone" was featured in the game MVP Baseball 2003. The band has performed live on NBC's Last Call with Carson Daly and FX's Orlando Jones Show.

The band's fourth album, entitled The Beauty of Letting Go was released in October 2005 on iRock Records, a subsidiary of Universal Records. Soon after releasing The Beauty of Letting Go, Brandon Bittner left the band and Socialburn hired a good friend, Syrus Peters, as a touring drummer in order to help finish out the rest of the tour. The band would play Budlight's Downtown Live in Raleigh, North Carolina, August 5, 2006, as an opener for Candlebox, Buzzfest in Nashville, Tennessee in September 2003 with Eve 6, Mudvayne, and Three Days Grace, SunFest in downtown West Palm Beach, Florida on May 4, 2006, and TK101's "A Lot of Rock" concert at Seville Quarter in Pensacola, Florida on June 24, 2006, with Faktion, SOiL, and 10 Years.

Shortly thereafter, the band's record label iRock dissipated and Socialburn was left unrepresented as a result. Without a label, they finished up their tour at Floyd's Music Store in Tallahassee, FL, the place where they originally made a name for themselves. The band then parted ways with their touring drummer and decided to take some time off. By November 2007, they officially disbanded.

In 2012, Socialburn lead singer Neil Alday announced the formation of a new band, "Neil Alday and Further South". They released the John Kurzweg produced EP "Whiskey, Women, Drugs and Gold" in 2014.

== Reunion ==
It was announced on Facebook that the band would be playing its first show in 10 years, with all four original members, on July 2, 2015, at Encore nightclub in Tallahassee, FL, the former location of Floyd's Music Store. The band followed up with reunion concerts at Club L.A. in Destin, FL and BackBooth in Orlando, FL.

Due to unforeseen circumstances, drummer Brandon Bittner was unable to perform at the reunion shows but the band's former manager, and current Neil Alday & Further South band member, Terry Clark, filled in on drums.

== Band members ==
Last formation

- Neil Alday - vocals, guitar (2000–2007)
- Chris Cobb - guitar (2000–2007)
- Dusty Price - bass, backing vocals (2000–2007)
- Syrus Peters - drums (2005–2006)

Prior members

- Brandon Bittner - drums (2000–2005)

== Discography ==
Studio albums

- What A Beautiful Waste (2000)
- World Outside (2002)
- Where You Are (2003)
- The Beauty of Letting Go (2005)

Singles

Year	Title	Peak chart positions		Album
Year	Title	U.S. Mainstream Rock	U.S. Modern Rock	Album
2003	"Down"	9	17	Where You Are
2003	"Everyone"	23	27	Where You Are
