= Seven Wiser (album) =

Studio album by Seven Wiser
- Released: June 8, 2004
- Genre: Post-grunge; nu metal; alternative metal
- Length: 40:26
- Label: Wind-up; Kik It
- Producer: Sandy Thomas

Seven Wiser chronology
Seven Wiser (2004)	Stronger (2008)

Singles from Seven Wiser
- 1. "Take Me as I Am" Released: April 6, 2004

Seven Wiser is the debut studio album by American rock band Seven Wiser. Although the album was not heavily promoted, the album sold over 10,000 copies in its short time available.

== Track listing ==
No.	Title	Length
1.	"Intro"	0:35
2.	"Life"	3:17
3.	"We're Sad"	3:14
4.	"Take Me as I Am"	3:57
5.	"Self Esteem"	4:01
6.	"Regret"	3:25
7.	"Good as You Think"	3:33
8.	"Lies"	3:01
9.	"Sick"	3:07
10.	"Love to Hate"	2:47
11.	"Losing Grip"	3:43
12.	"One in Equal"	3:30
13.	"Talk to Me"	2:29

B-side

- "Never"

== Use in media ==
- The track "Sick" has appeared on The Punisher Soundtrack, and in Wes Craven's Cursed.
- The song "Life" appears on the EA Sports video game NASCAR 2005: Chase for the Cup.
- The song "Take Me as I Am" appears on the EA Sports video game MVP Baseball 2004.

== Personnel ==
- Jon Santos – vocals
- Bill Lau – guitar
- Rob Ellis – bass
- Jerry Keating – drums
- John Signorella – drums
