= The World Can Wait =

Studio album by 67 Special
- Released: August 1, 2005
- Recorded: ?
- Genre: rock
- Length: 43:45
- Label: Festival Mushroom
- Producer: Andy Baldwin

67 Special chronology
Boys & Girls (2005)	The World Can Wait (2005)	The Devil May Care (2007)

Professional ratings
Review scores
Source	Rating
Elevenmagazine.com	4/5 stars
Fasterlouder.com.au	(favourable)
Rockus.com.au	(7.3/10)
Xdafied.com.au	4.5/5 stars

The World Can Wait is the first full-length album by rock music group 67 Special, and third release overall after their two earlier EP releases. The album was released in 2005 (see 2005 in music).

The track "Walking Away" was also released as a single.

== Track listing ==
1. "The World Can Wait" – 2:04
2. "Boys & Girls" – 2:56
3. "Walking Away" – 4:32
4. "Cotton Sheets" – 4:37
5. "Pretty Mess" – 3:28
6. "Radio Kill" – 2:38
7. "5 Degrees" – 2:23
8. "Blood Red Night" – 1:31
9. "It's It" – 5:35
10. "The Go" – 5:02
11. "The Traveller" – 6:51
12. "Cotton Sheets (Reprise)" – 2:08
