= Mitch Malloy =

American musician

- Born: August 26, 1961 (age 64); Dickinson, North Dakota, U.S.
- Genres: Rock, Hard rock
- Occupation: Singer
- Years active: 1980s–present
- Website: mitchmalloy.com

Mitch Malloy (born August 26, 1961) is an American singer, best known as the former lead vocalist for the rock band Great White from 2018 to 2022.

== Biography ==
Malloy studied music at Cornish College of the Arts in Seattle, Washington. He got his first break when he was signed to RCA. Malloy's self-titled first album, released on March 31, 1992, featured session musicians such as Mickey Curry, Hugh McDonald and Michael Thompson. The album was produced by engineer Sir Arthur Payson (according to Malloy, it was the first album Payson had produced on his own without his mentor, Desmond Child). His first single as a solo artist on RCA records, "Anything At All", was a top 20 rock charting hit and a pop hit in the US. It also charted on Billboard Hot 100 reaching #49 on June 13, 1992. "Anything At All" had a music video, which was featured on MTV's Headbangers Ball. The album's second single, "Nobody Wins in This War" peaked at No. 66 on Billboards Top 100 His third single, "Our Love Will Never Die", earned him an appearance on The Tonight Show with Jay Leno.

His second album, Ceilings And Walls, featured guest musicians such as Bernie Leadon, Mike Rutherford and Paul Carrack.

He auditioned to be the singer of hard rock band Van Halen after Sammy Hagar's departure. Malloy recorded various demos with the band, and Eddie Van Halen gave Malloy an instrumental demo to use for his own endeavors. This song was released by Malloy in 2015 as "It's the Right Time". The riff reemerged in the sessions leading up to Van Halen's 1998 studio album Van Halen III in the song "That's Why I Love You." The song was scrapped from the record in favor of "Josephina."

Malloy has had a lengthy career featuring in various bands as lead singer, releasing solo albums, and making guest appearances as well. His latest album marks his first time completing an entire release all on his own.

== Discography ==
=== Albums ===
Solo

- Mitch Malloy (1992)
- Ceilings & Walls (1994)
- My House (1995)
- Shine (2001)
- The Best of Mitch Malloy (2004)
- Faith (2008)
- Mitch Malloy II (2011)
- Shine On (2012)
- Making Noise (2016)
- The Last Song (2023)

Malloy

- Malloy 88 (2003)

Fluid Sol

- Fluid Sol (2004)

South of Eden

- South of Eden (2010)

Infinity

- Infinity (2012)

=== Singles ===
- Anything at All (1992) US Radio & Records #25
- Nobody Wins in This War (1992) #27
- Our Love Will Never Die (1992) #65
- Tumbling Down (1994)
- If Nothing Ever Changed (2009)
- Breathless (2013)
- What a Day (2013)
- It's Your Love (2013)
- Dakota Kid (2013)
- When I Was Your Man (2013) (Bruno Mars Cover)
- It's the Right Time feat. Van Halen (2015)
- My Therapy (2016)

=== DVD ===
Solo

- Live from Rock City (2009)

=== Guest appearance ===
Warren Hill

- Devotion (1993) "I Still Believe In You"

Tribute to Guns N' Roses

- "You Could Be Mine" on A Rock Tribute to Guns N' Roses (2002)

Liberty N' Justice

- "Only Heaven Knows" on Welcome to the Revolution (2004)

Voices of Rock

- "Lay You Down to Rest" on High & Mighty (2009)

Jett Blakk

- Rock Revolution (2016)
