= Where You Are (album) =

Studio album by Socialburn
- Released: February 2003
- Genre: Post-grunge
- Length: 47:31
- Label: Elektra
- Producer: John Kurzweg

Socialburn chronology
World Outside (2001)	Where You Are (2003)	The Beauty of Letting Go (2005)

Singles from Where You Are
- 1. "Down" Released: 2003; 2. "Everyone" Released: 2003

Where You Are was released by the American band Socialburn in February 2003. It was the band's major label debut, released on Elektra Records, and their third overall.

To date, the album has sold over 100,000 copies with relatively little promotion.

== Track listing ==
1. "Break Back" – 3:36 (Neil Alday, Dusty Price, Chris Cobb)
2. "Down" – 3:14 (Neil Alday, Dusty Price)
3. "Ashes" – 4:18 (Neil Alday, Kurzweg)
4. "Everyone" – 3:47 (Neil Alday, Chris Cobb)
5. "I'm Happy" – 4:28 (Neil Alday, Dusty Price)
6. "One More Day" – 3:54 (Neil Alday, Dusty Price)
7. "U" – 4:59 (Neil Alday, Chris Cobb)
8. "Never Be the Same" – 4:13 (Neil Alday)
9. "Utopia" – 4:28 (Dusty Price)
10. "Vacancy" – 2:57 (Neil Alday, Dusty Price)
11. "Pretend" – 3:48 (Neil Alday, Chris Cobb)
12. "Stacy" – 3:49 (Neil Alday, Dusty Price, Chris Cobb)
