= Fallzone =

American rock band

- Also known as: Seven Wiser (2002–2008); Fallzone (2009–present)
- Origin: New York City, U.S.
- Genres: Post-grunge; alternative rock; alternative metal; nu metal
- Years active: 2002–2008, 2009–present
- Labels: Wind-up, Crash, Zip Line, 1176 Studios
- Members: Jon Santos; Bill Lau; Rob Ellis; Jerry Keating
- Past members: Joe Belle; Tudor Capusan; Ben Gramm; Oliver Hoffer; John Signorella

Fallzone (formerly Seven Wiser) is a four-piece American alternative rock band from Jersey City, New Jersey.

== History ==
=== As Seven Wiser ===
Seven Wiser was founded in 2002 by producer/songwriter Sandy Thomas, Andrew Sbarra, and frontman Jon Santos who, at the time, used to record demos at a local studio. They were signed to Wind-up Records, in which the band released their debut self-titled album in June 2004. According to Sound Scan, Seven Wiser has been able to sound scan 10,000 copies of their debut album in the few months with the label. Wind-Up dropped the band later that same year.

The band signed up with Crash Records, around the time the band has finished their second album Stronger in 2007. The album was released for download on March 25, 2008. The band was dropped from the label two days later. The band subsequently broke up in August 2008, because of musical differences, difficulty booking gigs, and failed record deals. After the breakup, vocalist Jon Santos pursued a solo career and re-released "Stronger" in October 2008, excluding the track "This Time" in favor of a new song, "Losing Grip" and includes a piano mix of the title track "Stronger".

=== As Fallzone ===
In early 2009, the band formed back together under the new name "Fallzone". The album "Stronger", which was previously issued twice, was once again re-released under the new band name in April 2009, featuring a new single, "Never Gonna Be Alone".

The second album with the Fallzone name, The Long Road, was released June 2011.

== Band members ==
Current

- Jon Santos – vocals
- Bill Lau – guitar
- Jerry Keating – drums

Past Seven Wiser members / touring musicians

- Joe Belle – guitar
- Tudor Capusan – guitar
- Ben Gramm – drums
- Oliver Hoffer – bass
- John Signorella – drums
- Bobby Angilletta – drums
- Rob Ellis – bass

== Discography ==
Release date	Title	Label
June 8, 2004	Seven Wiser	Wind-Up Records
March 25, 2008 (Seven Wiser); October 28, 2008 (Jon Santos); April 14, 2009 (Fallzone)	Stronger	Crash Records (March 25, 2008); Zip Line Records (April 14, 2009)
June 21, 2011	The Long Road	1176 Studios
September 27, 2022	Secrets	Fallzone Music

== Singles ==
Year	Title	Chart positions	Album
Year	Title	US Mainstream Rock	Album
2004	"Take Me As I Am"	37	Seven Wiser
2005	"Life"	-	Seven Wiser
2009	"Never Gonna Be Alone"	-	Stronger
2011	"Dance with Me"	-	The Long Road
