= Wolf Mail =

Canadian blues rock guitarist and singer (born 1972)

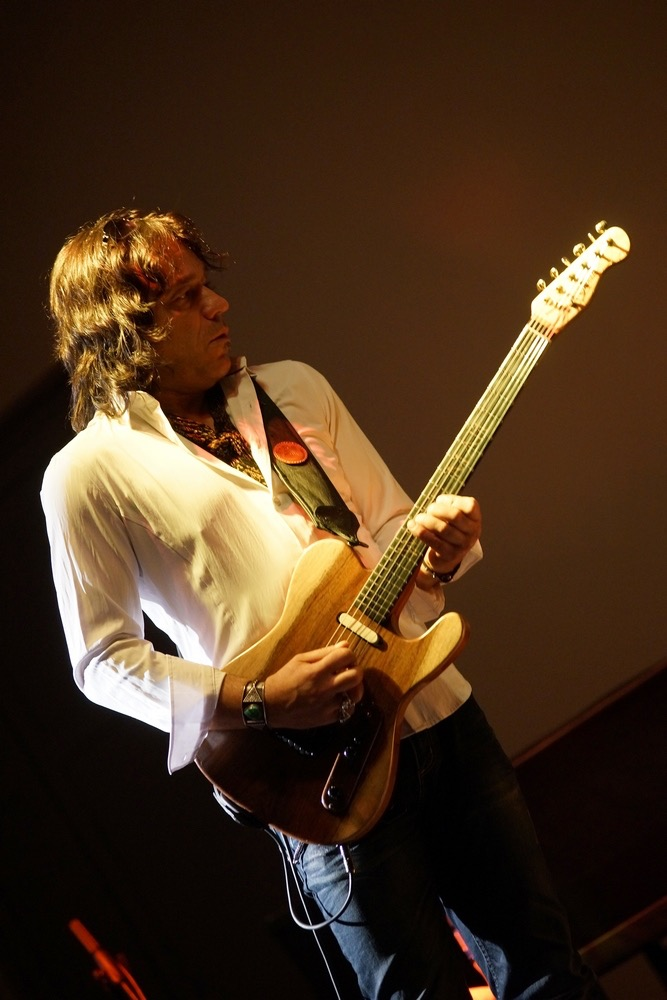
- Mail playing The MG-Hybrid in 2017

Background information
- Born: Wolf Mail; 1972 (age 53–54); Montreal, Quebec, Canada
- Genres: Blues; rock; roots
- Occupations: Musician; singer; songwriter
- Instruments: Guitar; vocals
- Years active: 1984–present
- Labels: ZYX, Productions LEA, BSMF Records
- Website: www.wolf-mail.com

Wolf Mail (born 1972) is a Canadian-born guitarist and singer-songwriter. Mail has recorded eight full-length albums, internationally distributed and has toured in over twenty-six countries. He is influenced by blues, jazz, soul and country.

== Early years ==
Mail was born in Montreal, Quebec, and raised in the South of France and California. Mail spent much of his early years traveling. He began playing the guitar at the age of ten, heavily influenced by Elmore James and John Lee Hooker. Later, Mail received guitar lessons from fellow Canadian guitarist David Goodman. Mail performed his first live show at fourteen, and at seventeen left home to tour with a band.

== Career ==
Mail recorded two independent albums in the mid-'90s before signing up with ZYX records. Since then he has released eight albums.

His first effort, Solid Ground, included the ballad "Hello" which stayed in the best selling music charts in Japan for three weeks and had fans declare their "favorite love song of all time".

Pre-production for his second album Blue Fix started in Los Angeles with Gary Mallaber on drums and Gerald Johnson on bass. The recording was completed in France with Niko Sarran on drums.

Mail then recorded a live CD and DVD Live Blues in Red Square in Moscow.

His fourth album Electric Love Soul was recorded in 2009 in Los Angeles at Dawghouse studios by Grammy Award winner Alan Mirikitani, and Robert Cray producer Dennis Walker.

His follow-up The Basement Session was recorded in Sydney, Australia, at the Basement by Chris Mysinski.

His sixth album, Above The Influence was released in October 2013. Rhythms Music Magazine said "it sees Mail return to where he cut his teeth, our teeth, everyone's teeth – again, searing electric blues."

Mail wrote and recorded his seventh album "The Wolf is at our door" in Sydney, Australia. The album was released in March 2023. "A contemporary bluesy vibe, slow burn vocals, and moments of psych-like sound that bring to mind Muddy Water’s Electric Mud, wrote the Blues Rock review

== Influences ==
Elmore James is the artist that Wolf cites as his first inspiration.

Wolf's playing style is a fusion of traditional blues, soul, and rock influences. He draws inspiration from guitar legends such as Albert Collins, Johnny Winter and Peter Green who have contributed to his playing style.

Wolf's playing ranges from stop-start staccato runs to Winter's more fluid style with lightning-fast runs. His intense, feverish style cuts a swathe between Buddy Guy and Rory Gallagher.

== International ==
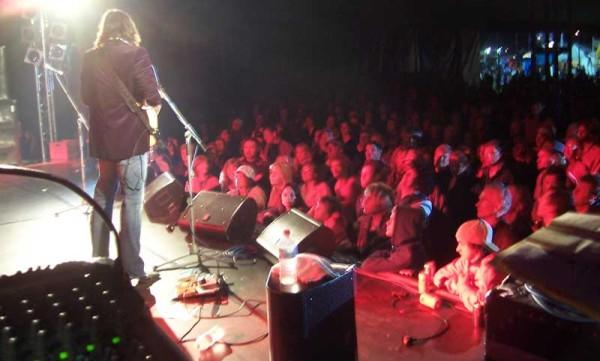
Mail performing at the Narooma Great Southern festival in Australia

For over two decades, Wolf has toured the US, Japan, Australia, and Europe, performing at clubs, festivals, small towns, and big cities. Over the course of his career, Mail has attracted a global audience.

== Awards and recognition ==
Player Magazine Japan selected Mail as the "Close-up" artist of the month in June 2005. Other artists have included Robert Cray and Brian Setzer. MusicOz Australia gave Wolf Mail best top 10 international performer of the year award for 2012.

== Musical instruments and gear ==
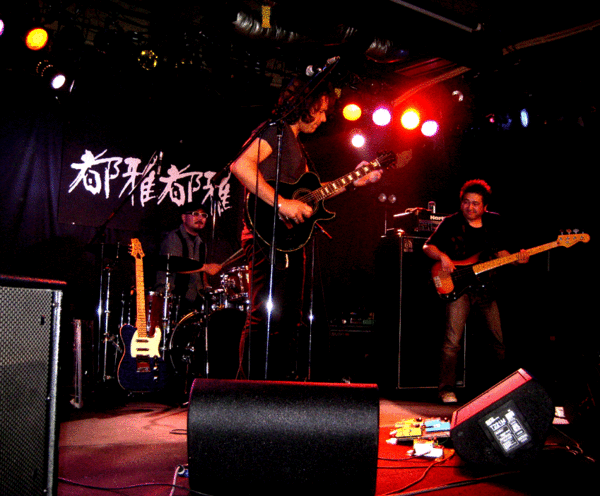
Mail performing in Tokyo, Japan "Above the Influence" Tour

Wolf uses a Mark Gilbert WM1 signature bearing his name along with the Mark Gilbert BC electro-acoustic guitars.

For recording sessions Wolf also uses a 1957 Fender Telecaster and a 1972 Gibson Les Paul Deluxe.

His guitar rig also includes several effects pedals such as an original 1978 Boss OD1 overdrive, a Boss CE-2 and a custom boost pedal.

For many years, Wolf was endorsed by Carvin Audio, and was one of the first artists with Joe Walsh to use the Carvin Bel Air vintage series.

Although Wolf has historically performed with Bel Air amplifiers, he now largely uses a Mesa Boogie Lonestar model.

== Discography ==
Wolf Mail

- 2002 – Solid Ground
- 2005 – Blue Fix
- 2009 – Live Blues in Red Square
- 2010 – Electric Love Soul
- 2011 – The Basement Session
- 2013 – Above The Influence
- 2015 – Oseana Auditorium
- 2023 – The Wolf is at Our Door

Collaborations

- 2015 – Blues Christmas (with Leslie West, Eric Gales, Kenny Neal, Pat Travers, Joe Louis Walker, Chris Spedding).
- 2018 – Live at the Lazy (with Milena Barrett)

== DVDs ==
- Live Blues in Red Square was released in 2009, and recorded at the Jazz Town Theater, in Moscow, Russia.
- Oseana Auditorium released in 2014 was recorded during Wolf's 2013 tour of Scandinavia, while supporting Blues legend Johnny Winter.

== Bibliography ==
- Rock my world Canada by Mike Carr. A comprehensive and historic reference book on Canadian blues artists.

== Record labels ==
- Japan/ Asia – BSMF Records
- Europe – ZYX Music
- North America – Cleopatra Records
