= Smashed Gladys =

American glam metal band

Smashed Gladys was an American glam rock band formed in 1982 by Bart Lewis and Sally Cato, who met in Toronto, Canada and then moved to Manhattan, US. The band was initially managed by Gene Simmons of Kiss with Sally Cato on vocals, Bart Lewis on lead guitar, Ken Fox on bass, and Matt Stelluto on drums. Ken Fox was replaced by JD Malo in 1984. The lineup for Smashed Gladys's first self titled record made at Rockfield studio in Wales in 1985 added Marcel Lafleur as a second Guitarist.

The Second Album, Social Intercourse was recorded in 1987 and released in 1988 on Elektra, with Marcel Lafleur replaced by Roger Lane. Ozzy Osbourne provided backing vocals for the song Cast of Nasties.

The Band's third record, Raw was released on Golden Robot records in 2023 and is a collection of demos from 1982 to 1993 with four songs produced by Gene Simmons: "Never Take No", "Stand Tall", "Give it All You Got" and "The Beat Goes On", with the band's core lineup: Sally Cato on vocals, Bart Lewis on guitar, Matt Stelluto on drums and Ken Fox on bass.

John Catto from the Canadian band The Diodes mixed "Bleed For Me", "Tattooed Blue", "What a Shame", "Rented Dreams" and "B.A.D", while Mark Deanley mixed "Go to Hell", "Ain’t Looking For Love", "Move Over", "Weekend Whiskey/ Lost Generation" and "Beggars and Thieves", with Vic D’Arsie replacing Ken Fox on bass and also playing keyboards.

Sally Cato and Bart Lewis mixed The songs "Black Beauties and Blue Eyed Blondes" and "Bump In The Night".

Bart Lewis, JD Malo and Matt Stelutto made cameo appearances in the music video for the Run-D.M.C. cover of "Walk This Way", as backing musicians for Steven Tyler and Joe Perry.

Lead vocalist Sally Cato died on May 19, 2020.

== Discography ==
=== Albums ===
- Smashed Gladys, 1985
- Social Intercourse, 1988
- ’’ Raw “”, 2023.

( Which is a collection of first draft demos written by Bart Lewis and Sally Cato and recorded mainly in their rehearsal studio between 1988 and 1993 plus an additional 4 songs recorded at Right Track Studios in 1983 with Gene Simmons producing .)

=== Singles ===
- "17 Goin' on Crazy", 1988

Lyrics- Sally Cato, Bart Lewis . Composer Bart Lewis

- "Lick it Into Shape", 1988, Lyrics-Sally Cato Composer- Bart Lewis
- "Legs Up", 1988,

Lyrics - Sally Cato, Bart Lewis Music- Bart Lewis

Some other songs from the Social intercourse record include, Eye of The Storm, Lyrics- Bart Lewis, composer - Bart Lewis . Sermonette, Lyrics - Sally Cato, Composer- Bart Lewis

Sources - Warner music publishing, Elektra records, SOCAN, ASCAP, Library of Congress copyright.
