= Ring dove =

Ring dove is an alternative name for the Barbary dove. It may also refer to:

== Species ==
- The common wood pigeon (Columba palumbus), particularly in older literature
- The ring-necked dove (Streptopelia capicola), also known as the Cape turtle dove or half-collared dove
- The Eurasian collared dove (Streptopelia decaocto)
- The vinaceous dove (Streptopelia vinacea)
- The red-eyed dove (Streptopelia semitorquata)
- The red collared dove (Streptopelia tranquebarica), also known as the red turtle dove
- The mourning collared dove or African mourning dove (Streptopelia decipiens)
- The African collared dove (Streptopelia roseogrisea)

== Other uses ==
- HMS Ringdove, a name used for seven ships of the Royal Navy
- SS Ringdove, a coaster in service 1947-50
- Ringdove, a former capital city located on Epi (island), Vanuatu
