= SS Badenia (1912) =

921 GRT coaster

History
- Name: Badenia (1912–39); Titania (1939–45); Empire Conexe (1945–47); Ringdove (1947–50)
- Owner: A Kirsten (1912- ); Kölner Reederei AG (-1932); Rhein-London Linie GmbH (1932–45); Ministry of War Transport (1945); Ministry of Transport (1945–47); General Steam Navigation Co Ltd (1947–50)
- Operator: A Kirsten (1912- ); Edmund Halm & Co (-1932); Rhein-London Linie GmbH (1932–45); Ministry of War Transport (1945); Ministry of Transport (1945–47); General Steam Navigation Co Ltd (1947–50)
- Port of registry: (German Empire) Cologne (1912–19); (Weimar Republic) Cologne (1919–33); (Nazi Germany) Cologne (1933–45); United Kingdom (1945–50)
- Builder: F Schichau GmbH
- Launched: 1912
- Identification: Code Letters HWCM (1912–34); Code Letters DGWA (1934–45)
- Fate: Scrapped

General characteristics
- Type: Coaster
- Tonnage: 921 GRT; 510 NRT
- Length: 219 ft 8 in (66.95 m)
- Beam: 33 ft 5 in (10.19 m)
- Depth: 13 ft 4 in (4.06 m)
- Installed power: Triple expansion steam engine
- Propulsion: Screw propeller

Badenia was a 921 GRT coaster that was built in 1912 by F Schichau GmbH, Elbing for German owners. She was renamed Titania in 1939. She was seized by the Allies at Rendsburg in May 1945, passed to the Ministry of War Transport (MoWT) and renamed Empire Conexe. In 1947, she was sold into merchant service and renamed Ringdove, serving until 1950 when she was scrapped.

== Description ==
The ship was built in 1912 by F Schichau GmbH, Elbing.

The ship was 219 feet 8 inches (66.95 m) long, with a beam of 33 feet 5 inches (10.19 m) a depth of 13 feet 4 inches (4.06 m). She had a GRT of 921 and a NRT of 510.

The ship was propelled by a six-cylinder triple expansion steam engine, which had two cylinders each of 11 4/5 inches (30 cm), 19 7/16 inches (49.4 cm) and 34 1/2 inches (88 cm) diameter by 17 3/4 inches (45 cm). The engine was built by F Schichau.

== History ==
Badenia was built for A Kirsten, Hamburg. Her port of registry was Cologne and the Code Letters HWCM were allocated. By 1930, she had been sold to Kölner Reederei AG and was being operated under the management of Edmund Halm & Co. In 1932, she was sold to Rhein-London Linie GmbH. In 1934, her Code Letters were changed to DGWA. In 1939, Badenia was renamed Titania. This change was not recorded by Lloyds Register, she continued to be listed as Badenia.

In May 1945, Titania was seized by the Allies at Rendsburg. She was passed to the MoWT and renamed Empire Conexe. In 1947, she was sold to the General Steam Navigation Co Ltd and renamed Ringdove. She served until 1950 when she was scrapped at Bo'ness, West Lothian.
