= Spectrum360 =

Private special school in Verona, New Jersey

Coordinates: 40.823341°N 74.229083°W

- Established: 1963
- Type: Nonprofit
- Headquarters: West Orange, NJ
- Executive Director & Chief Executive Officer: Ken Berger, MBA, MA
- Assistant Executive Director: Danielle Taylor, Psy.D.
- Website: spectrum360.org

Spectrum360 is a NewJersey-based 501(c)(3) nonprofit serving children, teens and adults with autism and related disabilities. With locations in Livingston, West Orange, Verona and Whippany, the organization supports nearly 500 students, adults, and staff across its educational program, Academy360; adult day and vocational programs, Independence360; and two enrichment programs, FilmAcademy360 and CulinaryAcademy360.
