= Skew Siskin =

German hard rock band

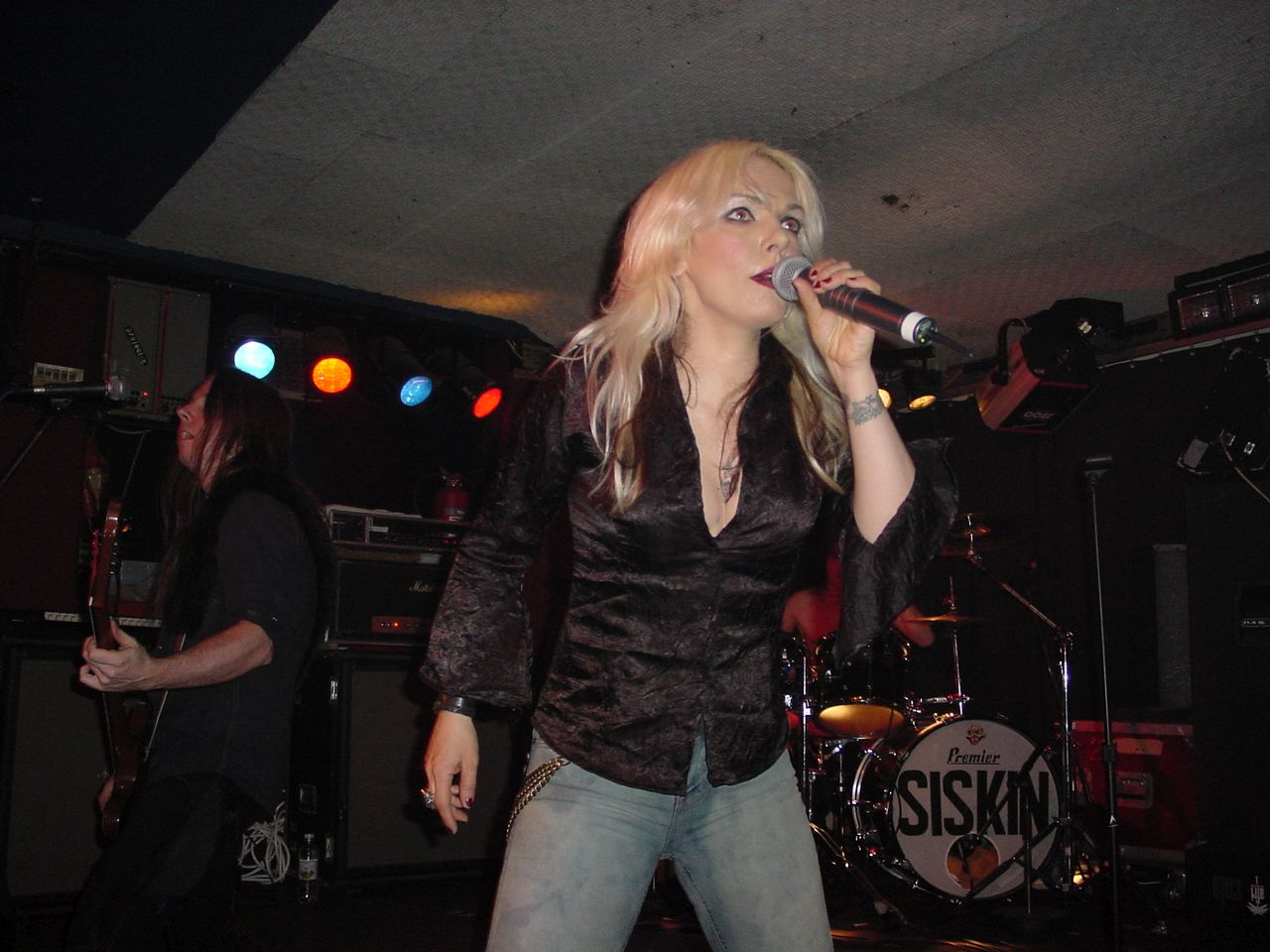
Skew Siskin performing in 2004

Skew Siskin are a German hard rock band based in Berlin. They formed in 1990 when guitarist Jim Voxx met up with singer Nina C. Alice. The band's original line up was completed by the addition of drummer Nik Terry and bass guitarist Jogi Rautenberg. The band's name translated into English means "Crazy Bird"; Nina C. Alice chose the name as due to spending time living in Britain knew that "bird" there is often colloquially used to refer to women.

They signed up with Giant Records in 1992, under whose label they released their debut album, the self-titled Skew Siskin, in 1992. The album showcased an aggressive hard-rock sound compared with both AC/DC and Motörhead, and received favourable reviews. The track "If the Walls Could Talk" became a minor hit on MTV. During 1993 and 1994 the band toured Europe with Accept, Alice Cooper and Anthrax, Saxon and also with Black Sabbath in the US. They also played shows with a variety of other bands including Motörhead and Monster Magnet. Motörhead's frontman Lemmy was impressed with the German rock band, and would go on to collaborate with Skew Siskin on several occasions in the following years.

== Discography ==
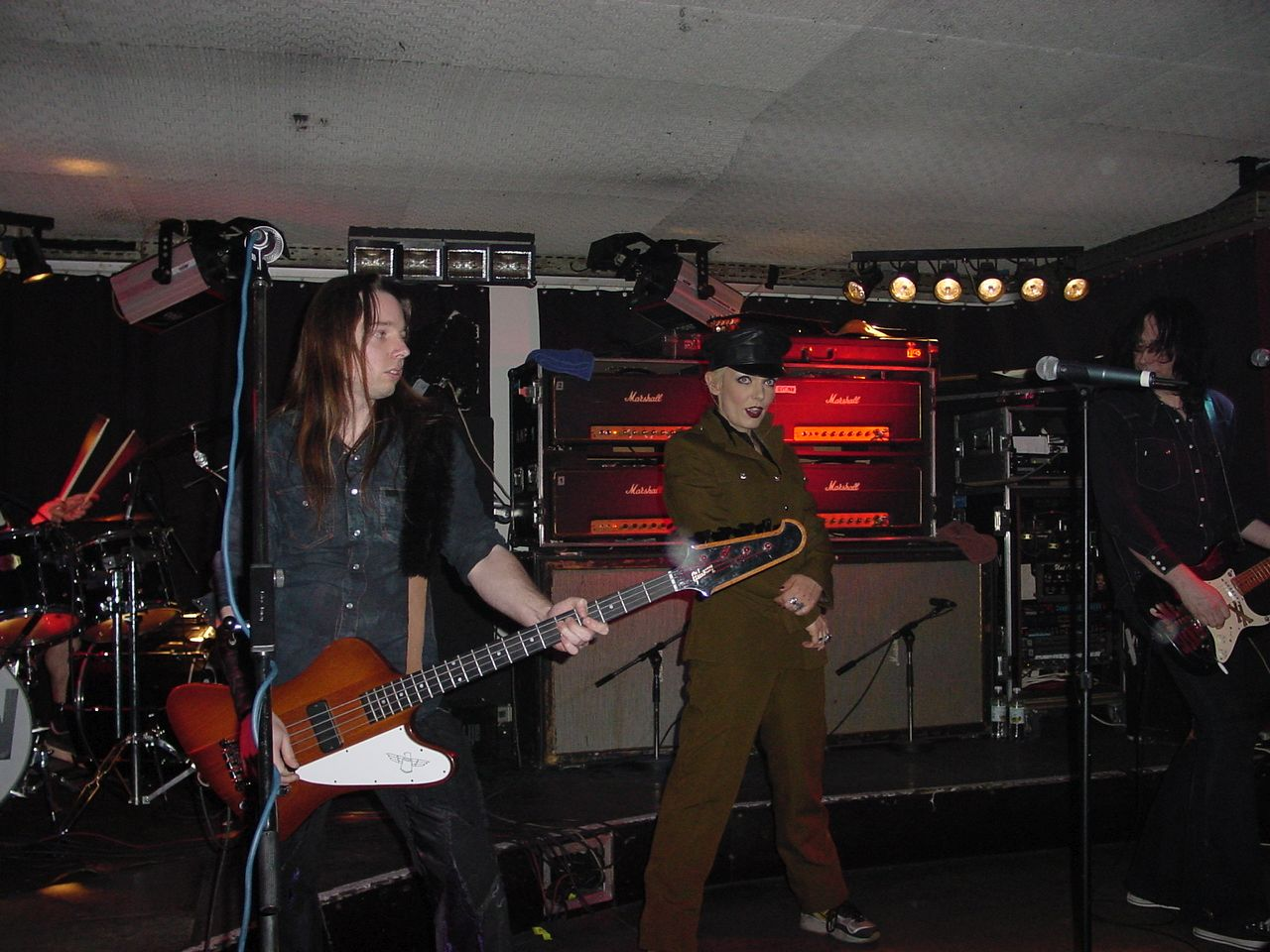
Skew Siskin performing in 2004

Albums

- Skew Siskin (1992)
- Electric Chair Music (1996)
- Voices from the War (1996)
- What the Hell (1999)
- Album of the Year (2003)
- Devil's Disciple (compilation) (2005)
- Peace Breaker (2007)
