= Skew Siskin (album) =

Studio album by Skew Siskin
- Released: 1992
- Studio: Morongo Studio, Berlin, Germany
- Genre: Hard rock
- Length: 58:00
- Label: Giant
- Producer: Jim Voxx

Skew Siskin chronology
Skew Siskin (1992)	Electric Chair Music (1996)

Professional ratings
Review scores
Source	Rating
Collector's Guide to Heavy Metal	6/10
Rock Hard	9.0/10

Skew Siskin is the debut studio album by the German hard rock band Skew Siskin, released in 1992.

== Track listing ==
No.	Title	Lyrics	Music	Length
1.	"If the Walls Could Talk"	Ric Browde	China, Jim Voxx, Jogy Rautenberg, Nik Terry, Nina C. Alice	4:35
2.	"Out of Control"	China	Voxx	3:01
3.	"I Wanna Know"	Alice	Voxx, Alice	5:02
4.	"Livin' on the Redline"	China, Browde	Voxx, Rautenberg, Terry, Alice	3:34
5.	"In Another World"	Alice	Voxx, Rautenberg, Terry, Alice	12:27
6.	"I Gotta Go Away"	China, Alice	Voxx, Alice	4:04
7.	"When the Sun Goes Down"	Alice	Voxx, Alice	5:16
8.	"Sniffin' the Dirt"	Alice	Voxx, Alice	3:55
9.	"Thank You for the Time"	China, Alice	Voxx, Rautenberg, Alice	5:14
10.	"All Day and All of the Night" (The Kinks cover)	Ray Davies	Davies	2:35
11.	"Cheap Trick" (CD and cassette edition bonus track)	Alice	Voxx, Rautenberg, Alice	4:53
12.	"Shake Down and Roll" (CD and cassette edition bonus track)	China, Alice	Voxx, Alice	3:24

== Personnel ==
=== Band members ===
- Nina C. Alice - lead and backing vocals, keyboards on track 5
- Jim Voxx - guitar, keyboards on track 7, producer, engineer, mixing
- Jogy Rautenberg - bass
- Nik Terry - drums, percussion

=== Additional musicians ===
- Thomas Glanz - keyboards on track 7, Hammond organ on track 9

=== Production ===
- Arranged by Skew Siskin
- Additional engineering by Jogy Rautenberg, Nik Terry, Nina C. Alice, Will Roper
- Tracks: 2, 3, 6, 12 mixed by Brian Malouf, assisted by Pat MacDougall at Can-Am Recorders, Tarzana, California
- Art direction and design by Hugh Syme
- Paintings by Marshall Arisman
- Mastered by George Marino at Sterling Sound, New York
