= Siskin Children's Institute =

American charity for children with special needs

Coordinates: 35.0430°N 85.3136°W

Siskin Children's Institute is a non-profit organization serving children with special needs and their families, with onsite locations in Chattanooga, Tennessee and Nashville, Tennessee. Founded in 1950 by Chattanooga businessmen Mose and Garrison Siskin, the Institute provides comprehensive services including ABA therapy, occupational therapy (OT), physical therapy (PT), speech therapy, and feeding therapy. Siskin also offers medical diagnostic services for autism at both the Chattanooga and Nashville locations. In addition, the Institute partners with TEIS to provide Home and Community-Based Early Intervention services and offers family support services to ensure coordinated, compassionate care for children and families.

== History ==
In 1942, Garrison Siskin suffered a life-threatening injury, and surgeons told him that his leg would have to be amputated. He prayed to God that if his leg were spared, he would dedicate the rest of his life to helping others. The next morning, doctors told Garrison he would not lose his leg.

Garrison's brother Mose soon learned of the vow, he told his brother, "If it's your promise, it's my promise, and we will keep it together." They established the Siskin Foundation in 1950; and nine years later, they opened a rehabilitation center to provide outpatient services, including physical therapy, speech and language therapy, and even free dental care in Chattanooga.

During the next 30 years, the brothers championed numerous community projects focused on services for adults and children with disabilities. A highlight was the1959 opening of an outpatient rehabilitation center that included a preschool for young children with physical and developmental disabilities. The Siskin School was a precursor to today's multi-faceted Siskin Children's Institute, which serves children, families and professionals through four areas of focus: education, outreach, health care, and research.

== Fundraising ==
As the organization is a nonprofit, Siskin Children's Institute holds regular fundraising events, including StarNight, an annual event that typically features an elegant dinner, entertainment, and live auction.
