= For the Taken =

Studio album by Mercy Fall
- Released: 2006
- Genre: Rock
- Length: 44:08
- Label: Atlantic
- Producer: Howard Benson

For the Taken is the debut and only studio album by American rock band Mercy Fall released on May 9, 2006. First single "I Got Life" was released to radio stations on March 4. The song spent eight weeks on the Billboard Mainstream Rock chart where it peaked at number 36. Corey Apar of Allmusic called the album "a competent debut that could be the start of better things for them."

== Track listing ==
No.	Title	Length
1.	"Insurmountable"	3:43
2.	"Hangman"	3:32
3.	"Worth"	4:37
4.	"Not Broken Down"	3:40
5.	"I Got Life"	3:24
6.	"Here I Am"	3:55
7.	"Fade"	4:47
8.	"Hush"	4:37
9.	"In Doubt"	4:19
10.	"Wake"	4:09
11.	"No More Silence"	5:25

== Personnel ==
- Howard Benson – producer
- Blake "Black" Allison – drums, vocals
- Joey Chicago – bass guitar, vocals
- Nate Stone – lead vocals
- Jeff James – guitar, vocals
