= James Palumbo =

British peer and businessman (born 1963)

The Right Honourable The Lord Palumbo of Southwark
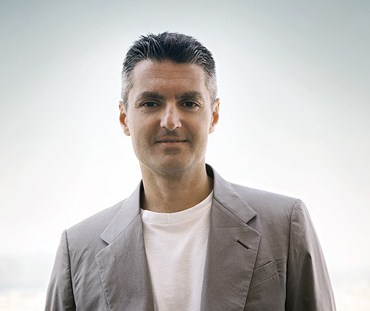

Member of the House of Lords
- Lord Temporal
- Life peerage 2 October 2013 – 1 April 2026

Personal details
- Born: James Rudolph Palumbo; 6 June 1963 (age 62) London, England
- Party: Liberal Democrats
- Children: 1
- Parent(s): Peter Palumbo, Baron Palumbo; Denia Wigram
- Education: Eton College
- Alma mater: Worcester College, Oxford
- Occupation: Entrepreneur
- Net worth: £300 million, (Est. 2020)

James Rudolph Palumbo, Baron Palumbo of Southwark (born 6 June 1963) is a British entrepreneur and member of the House of Lords.

== Early life and education ==
The eldest son of property developer Peter Palumbo, Baron Palumbo, Jamie was born in London and educated at Eton College and Worcester College, Oxford.

== Career ==
From 1984 to 1992, Palumbo worked in the City of London for the investment banks Merrill Lynch and Morgan Grenfell, focusing on equity capital markets and property finance.

In September 1991 Palumbo, together with his school friend Humphrey Waterhouse and DJ Justin Berkmann, founded the Ministry of Sound nightclub in South London. Ministry of Sound expanded into recorded music and by 2014 had become the largest independent music company in the world. In 2016 he sold Ministry of Sound Recordings to the Sony Music Group for $104 million.

In 1994 he launched legal proceedings against his father with his sister, Annabella Adams, claiming his father had mismanaged the family trust; subsequently his father resigned as a trustee.

His debut novel about corruption in the modern world, Tomas, was published in 2009. Stephen Fry called the novel "remarkable... It's as if Thomas Pynchon and Burroughs and Vonnegut got together and had a bastard love child." His second novel, Tancredi, about short-termism in politics, was published in 2011.

=== House of Lords ===
Following the 2010 election, Palumbo helped reorganise Lib Dem headquarters to make the party more efficient in Government. In October 2013, Palumbo was created a life peer taking the title Baron Palumbo of Southwark, of Southwark, in the London Borough of Southwark.

== Personal life ==
Palumbo lives in London with a Thai female friend, Rawipim Paijit. In 2017, he opened an animal sanctuary in Thailand with Paijit, focused on spay and neuter, rescue, rehabilitation and rehoming of street dogs.

He has a child, born in 1991 to Atoosa Hariri.

== Awards ==
In 2016, Palumbo was appointed an Honorary Fellow of the School of Business at London South Bank University, this in recognition for his achievements in the business world and his contribution to the local cultural landscape.

Orders of precedence in the United Kingdom
Preceded by The Lord Allen of Kensington	Gentlemen; Baron Palumbo of Southwark	Followed by The Lord Bamford
