= Jesse Colin Young discography =

The discography of Jesse Colin Young, an American singer and songwriter, consists of around 17 studio albums, 7 compilation albums, 6 live albums and at least 17 singles. He was a founding member and lead singer of the 1960s group the Youngbloods.

== Studio albums ==
List of studio albums, with selected chart positions
Title	Release	Peak chart positions	
Title	Release	US	CAN
The Soul of a City Boy	Released: April 1964; Label: Capitol; Formats: LP, CD	172	—
Young Blood	Released: March 1965; Label: Mercury; Formats: LP, CD	—	—
Together	Released: March 25, 1972; Label: Warner Bros.; Formats: LP, CD, 8-track	157	—
Song for Juli	Released: October 6, 1973; Label: Warner Bros.; Formats: LP, CD, cassette, 8-track cartridge	51	81
Light Shine	Released: April 20, 1974; Label: Warner Bros.; Formats: LP, CD	37	37
Songbird	Released: March 2, 1975; Label: Warner Bros.; Formats: LP, CD, 8-track, cassette	26	20
Love on the Wing	Released: April 2, 1977; Label: Warner Bros.; Formats: LP, CD, 8-track, cassette	64	60
American Dreams	Released: December 9, 1978; Label: Elektra; Formats: LP, CD	165	—
The Perfect Stranger	Released: July 1982; Label: Elektra; Formats: LP, cassette, CD	—	—
The Highway Is for Heroes	Released: July 23, 1987; Label: Cypress; Formats: LP, cassette, CD	—	—
Makin' It Real	Released: August 25, 1993; Label: Ridgetop Music (US), PolyStar (JPN), Edsel (UK); Formats: CD, cassette	—	—
Swept Away	Released: September 8, 1994; Label: Ridgetop Music (US), Edsel (UK); Formats: CD, cassette	—	—
Walk the Talk	Released: May 2, 2001; Label: Kani Kapila Music; Formats: CD	—	—
Songs for Christmas	Released: September 24, 2002; Label: Liquid 8; Formats: CD	—	—
Living in Paradise	Released: September 7, 2004; Label: Artemis; Formats: CD	—	—
Celtic Mambo	Released: 2006; Label: Kani Kapila Music; Formats: CD	—	—
Dreamers	Released: February 15, 2019; Label: BMG; Formats: CD, vinyl, digital download, streaming	—	—
"—" denotes that the recording did not chart.

== Compilation albums ==
Title	Release
Two Trips	Released: 1970; Label: Mercury; Formats: LP
Classics: Volume 1	Released: 1989; Label: Keahou Management (US), PolyStar (JPN); Formats: CD
The Best of Jesse Colin Young: The Solo Years	Released: November 19, 1991; Label: Rhino Records; Formats: CD, cassette
Crazy Boy	Released: April 11, 1995; Label: Ridgetop Music; Formats: CD, cassette
Greatest Hits	Released: February 24, 1998; Label: Award Records; Formats: CD
Greatest Hits	Released: November 13, 2001; Label: Bean Bag Entertainment; Formats: CD
The Very Best of Jesse Colin Young	Released: October 4, 2005; Label: Artemis Records; Formats: CD

== Live albums ==
List of live albums, with selected chart positions
Title	Release	Peak chart positions	
Title	Release	US	CAN
On the Road	Released: March 27, 1976; Label: Warner Bros.; Formats: LP, CD, cassette	34	44
Sweetwater	Released: June 13, 1996; Label: Ridgetop Music; Formats: CD	—	—
Standing Room Only	Released: January 30, 2007; Label: Sony; Formats: CD	—	—
Out of the Darkness	Released: August 1, 2015; Label: Kani Kapila Music; Formats: DVD	—	—
Live at Daryl's House	Released: 2017; Label: Kani Kapila Music; Formats: DVD	—	—
Sea West (Live 1974)	Released: February 6, 2019; Label: Shockwaves; Formats: CD, digital download	—	—
"—" denotes that the recording did not chart.

== Singles ==
Title	Year	Album
"Peace Song" / "Pretty In The Fair"	1970	Non-album single
"It's a Lovely Day" / "Sweet Little Child"	1972	Together
"Good Times" / "Peace Song"	1972	Together
"Morning Sun" / "Evenin'"	1973	Song for Juli
"Light Shine" / "The Cuckoo"	1974	Light Shine
"Susan" / "Barbados"	1974	Light Shine
"Motorhome" / "Sugar Babe"	1975	Songbird
"Songbird" / "'Til You Come Back Home"	1975	Songbird
"Sunlight" / "Peace Song"	1976	On the Road
"Higher & Higher" / "Fool"	1977	Love on the Wing
"Love on the Wing" / "California Cowboy"	1977	Love on the Wing
"Rave On" / "Maui Sunrise"	1978	American Dreams
"Sanctuary" / "City Boy"	1978	American Dreams
"Slow and Easy" (UK b side of "Rave On")	1978	American Dreams
"Fight for It" (duet with Carly Simon) / "Hidin' Away" (Non-album b side)	1982	The Perfect Stranger
"Ophelia" / "The Hawk"	1982	The Perfect Stranger
"Desire"	1994	Swept Away
"Bring 'em Home"	2007	Non-album single
