= Lowell Levinger =

American musician (born 1944)

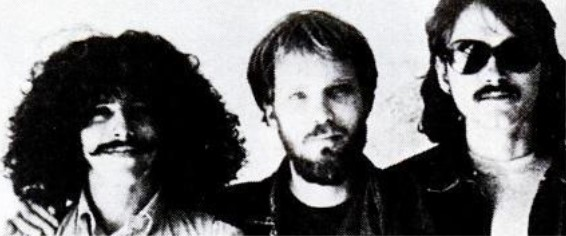
- Levinger (left) with the Youngbloods in 1970

Background information
- Also known as: Banana
- Born: September 9, 1944 (age 82)
- Genres: Folk rock, bluegrass
- Occupation: Singer-songwriter
- Instruments: guitar, piano, banjo, mandolin, bass, esraj
- Years active: 1962–present
- Member of: Little Steven and the Disciples of Soul
- Formerly of: The Youngbloods

Lowell Vincent Levinger III (born September 9, 1944), also known as Banana, is an American singer-songwriter and producer, best known as a member of the folk rock band the Youngbloods. He now plays in Little Steven and the Disciples of Soul, a large collective led by Steven Van Zandt. Levinger can play guitar, piano, banjo, mandolin, mandola esraj and bass. As of 2025, he is the last surviving original member of the Youngbloods.

== Early life ==
Levinger was born and raised in Santa Rosa, California and attended Santa Rosa High School. Levinger was kicked out of high school due to him "not being able to keep my mouth shut", and was then sent to Robert Louis Stevenson High School in Pebble Beach, which he was also kicked out of, claiming it was "like being in prison". By the early 1960s, he moved from California to Massachusetts, and was enrolled in a preparatory school there.

Levinger's love of folk music came in high school, when his History teacher, who had just graduated from Harvard, bonded over folk, blues, R&B and rock and roll. The teacher then sent a letter to his parents in Cambridge to send over folk records for Lowell to listen to. The records, which included Lester Flatt and Earl Scruggs and the Foggy Mountain Boys, "changed (his) life". He also advised Levinger to go to Boston University as Levinger wanted to be an actor and the university had "a great theatre department".

== Career ==
=== Early career ===
Levinger started his professional musical career while at Boston University in 1962. His first band came while he and his friend, Peter Golden, were working as stage hands in a theatre production, and while waiting for a song to finish, decided to think up the most unusual folk band names, and soon the name "Harmon N. Banana" was said. The two then made a band with the name "Harmon N. Banana and the Bunch - Old Time Music With Appeal", but after a while the name was just shortened to "Banana and the Bunch", which is how Levinger acquired the nickname "Banana". Famous luthier Rick Turner was in this band at some point; Levinger and Turner also ran a summer shop in Martha's Vineyard.

While fronting Banana and the Bunch, he was mentored by Bill Kieth and the Charles River Valley Boys. He was also in bands called Proper Bostians and the Trolls. Eventually, Banana and the Bunch got popular and due to the high amount of gigs, Lowell dropped out of university. Around this time, Levinger started buying vintage instruments as he realised that "the instruments being made then (1960s) weren’t nearly as good as used instruments made 20 or thirty years previously". Levinger still buys and plays vintage instruments to this day.

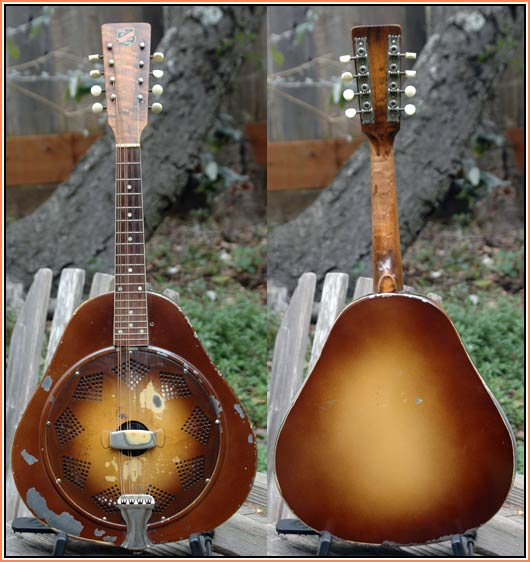
One of the vintage Resonator mandolins Levinger owns; this make is from 1930

=== The Youngbloods ===
Lowell met the members of the Youngbloods, Jesse Colin Young, Jerry Corbitt and Joe Bauer, in Cambridge. Levinger says that he was woken up one night by Corbitt telling him he has to move to Greenwich Village in New York to be the guitarist and keyboardist in the band, but after telling Jerry that he did not own a keyboard, was told that Bill Briggs from the Remains was selling his. The band he was in at the time, the Trols, wasn't going anywhere, so he agreed to move to New York with the Youngbloods.

In 1969, the band re-released their 1967 single "Get Together", which got to the top 5 in the US charts. Corbitt also left in 1969, and Levinger moved to lead guitar.

=== Later career ===
The Youngbloods disbanded in 1972, and Levinger joined the band Noggins with Bauer and Michael Kane (who joined the Youngbloods in 1971), they released only one album. Levinger also made a new group named after his first band, Banana & the Bunch. Levinger then joined Mimi Fariña, who he first met in Cambridge in 1963, as a supporting musician in 1973, and worked with her on and off for over twenty years, until the 1990s. He also ran his own recording studio.

In 1984, Levinger formed Zero with Steve Kimock, Greg Anton and John Cipollina. He has also worked with the bands Dan Hicks and his Hot Licks and the Barry Melton Band, and has performed alongside David Nelson, Keith Little, Freebo, and Peter Rowan. Also in 1984, Levinger reformed the Youngbloods with Young and Corbitt, for a reunion tour which lasted until 1985.

Lowell started playing gigs as a solo artist around 2006, and since 2009, Levinger has released five albums. The first three albums, I'll Do Anything For You (2009), Just Trying To Break Even (2011) and Even Grandpas Get the Blues (2012), were released as Grandpa Banana, a moniker his manager convinced him to drop. His two most recent albums, Get Together - Banana Recalls Youngbloods Classics and Down to the Roots, were released under his own name. He toured with Little Steven and the Disciples of Soul, led by Steven Van Zandt, for their 2017 European and 2018 American tour.

== Personal life ==
Levinger lives in West Marin, California, and has seven children. He collects stringed acoustic instruments.

== Discography ==
Year	Title	Band
1966	A Harvest of Gentle Clang	Patrick Sky album
1967	The Youngbloods	The Youngbloods album
1967	Earth Music	The Youngbloods album
1969	Elephant Mountain	The Youngbloods album
1969	Paradise Bar and Grill	Mad River album
1970	Rock Festival	The Youngbloods live album
1971	Good and Dusty	The Youngbloods album
1971	Ride the Wind	The Youngbloods live album
1972	High on a Ridge Top	The Youngbloods album
1972	Mid-Mountain Ranch	Banana & the Bunch album
1985	Solo	Mimi Fariña album
2006	Stomp	Mike Compton and David Long album
2009	I'll Do Anything For You	Solo album, released as "Grandpa Banana"
2011	Just Trying To Break Even	Solo album, released as "Grandpa Banana"
2012	Even Grandpas Get the Blues	Solo album, released as "Grandpa Banana"
2014	Down to the Roots	Solo album
2015	Get Together - Banana Recalls Youngbloods Classics	Solo album
2017	Soulfire	Little Steven and the Disciples of Soul album
2018	Soulfire Live!	Little Steven and the Disciples of Soul live album
2021	Summer of Sorcery Live! At the Beacon Theatre	Little Steven and the Disciples of Soul live album
