= Song for Juli =

Studio album by Jesse Colin Young
- Released: September 1973
- Recorded: 1973
- Genre: Country rock/Folk rock
- Length: 39:58
- Label: Warner Bros.
- Producer: Jesse Colin Young

Jesse Colin Young chronology
Together (1972)	Song for Juli (1973)	Light Shine (1974)

Professional ratings
Review scores
Source	Rating
Allmusic	4/5 stars

Song for Juli is the fourth solo album by singer-songwriter Jesse Colin Young, formerly of the Youngbloods. It became his most commercially successful release, charting higher than any Youngbloods album and remaining on the charts longer than any other album in his career.

Several of the songs include allusions to Young's ridgetop home in Inverness, California. The house burned down in the 1995 Mount Vision Fire.

== Track listing ==
1. "Mornin' Sun" (J.C. Young) – 4:04
2. "Song for Juli" (J.C. Young, Suzi Young) – 4:59
3. "Ridgetop" (J.C. Young) – 7:02
4. "Evenin'" (J.C. Young) – 3:13
5. "Miss Hesitation" (J.C. Young) – 6:26
6. "T-Bone Shuffle" (T-Bone Walker) – 5:03
7. "Lafayette Waltz" (Clifton Chenier) – 1:45
8. "Jambalaya" (Hank Williams) – 3:18
9. "Country Home" (J.C. Young) – 4:04

== Personnel ==
- Jesse Colin Young – guitar, vocals
- Suzi Young – harmony vocals
- David Hayes – bass, harmony vocals
- Eddy Ottenstein – guitar
- Jeff Myer – drums
- Scott Lawrence – piano, vibraphone
- Rick Anderson – harmonica
- John Tenney – violin
- Jim Rothermel – clarinet, saxophone, flute
- Bob Ferreira – saxophone
- Mel Martin – saxophone
- Tom Harrell – trumpet
- Gordon Messick – trombone
- Pat O'Hara – trombone
- Earthquake – harmonica

== Production ==
- Producer: Jesse Colin Young
- Recording Engineer: Jesse Colin Young, Suzi Young, Bob Ferreira, Tom Harrell, David Hayes, Scott Lawrence, Mel Martin, Gordon Messick, Jim Rothermel, John Tenney
- Mastering: John Cuniberti, Ethan Turner
- Art Design: Sidney Wasserbach
- Photography: Jon Sievert, Sidney Wasserbach
- Liner Notes: Unknown
