= Inverness Park, California =

Unincorporated community in California, United States

Inverness Park
- Unincorporated community
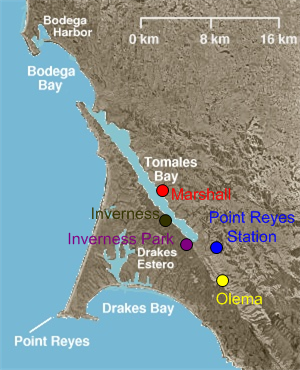
- Towns of rural western Marin County. Inverness Park is in violet.

- Location in California Inverness Park (the United States)
- Coordinates: 38°03′50″N 122°49′22″W
- Country: United States
- State: California
- County: Marin

Government
  - County Board: District 4 Dennis Rodoni
  - State Senate: Mark Leno (D)
  - Assembly: Stephanie Nguyen (D)
  - U. S. Congress: Jared Huffman (D)
- Elevation: 148 ft (45 m)
- Time zone: UTC-8 (PST)
  - Summer (DST): UTC-7 (PDT)
- ZIP code: 94956
- Area codes: 415/628
- FIPS code: 06-36630
- GNIS feature ID: 1658828

Inverness Park is a small unincorporated community in Marin County, California, United States. It is located 1 mile (1.6 km) west-southwest of Point Reyes Station, at an elevation of 148 feet (45 m).

Inverness Park is located between the communities of Point Reyes Station and Inverness. The community uses Point Reyes Station's post office. The community's population is counted as part of the Inverness census-designated place.

It stretches for three or four miles (6 km) from Limantour Road, north along Sir Francis Drake Boulevard, hugging the western edge of Tomales Bay. It is immediately adjacent to the Point Reyes National Seashore.

== History ==
Development began in 1909.

The community's original population included many Portuguese and Italian immigrants who worked the land. At least two fish hatcheries existed in the area until about 50 years ago.

Originally a few isolated houses, Inverness Park expanded in the 1950s as a failed developer's pipe dream called Noren Estates. A later, more successful housing expansion in the steep hills called Paradise Ranch Estates more than doubled the population. A product of David Adams Real Estate, Paradise Ranch Estates sold parcels with views of the Pacific Ocean and Tomales Bay. Paradise Ranch Estates was plagued by problems relating to its roads and availability of water. As the Adams family moved out of ownership, residents assumed the task of road improvement and maintenance. After the floods of January 4, 1982, a municipal water supply was hooked up.

In the fires of October 1995, forty-eight homes on the ridges of Paradise Ranch Estates burned, including that of singer Jesse Colin Young.
