= Swept Away =

Swept Away may refer to:

== Music ==
- Swept Away (musical), a 2022 musical featuring the music of The Avett Brothers

=== Albums and EPs ===
- Swept Away (Steve Hunter album), 1977
- Swept Away (Diana Ross album), 1984
- Swept Away (Jesse Colin Young album), 1994
- Swept Away, a 2004 EP by The Avett Brothers
- Swept Away (Marc Johnson album), 2012

=== Songs ===
- "Swept Away" (song), a song by Diana Ross on her 1984 album of the same name
- "Swept Away", a song by Yanni, first on his 1988 album Chameleon Days
- "Swept Away", a song by Nellie McKay from her 2005 album Pretty Little Head
- "Swept Away", a song by Against All Will from the 2009 album A Rhyme & Reason
- "Swept Away", a song by The xx from their 2012 album Coexist

== Film and television ==
- Swept Away (1974 film), an Italian film written and directed by Lina Wertmüller
- Swept Away (2002 film), a remake of the 1974 film, directed by Guy Ritchie and starring Madonna
- Swept Away (television), an episode from Discovery Channel's series I Shouldn't Be Alive
