= Jerry Corbitt =

American singer-songwriter

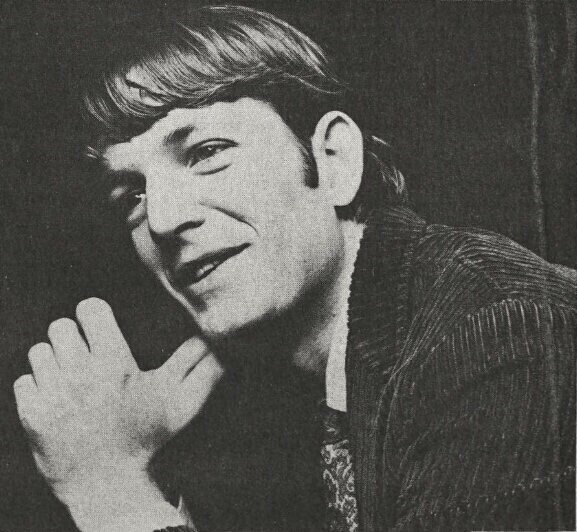
- Corbitt in 1967

Background information
- Born: January 7, 1943; Tifton, Georgia, US
- Died: March 8, 2014 (aged 71) Smiley, Texas, US
- Genres: folk rock
- Instruments: Vocals; guitar
- Years active: 1965–1971
- Formerly of: The Youngbloods

Jerry Corbitt (born Jerry Byron Corbitt; January 7, 1943 – March 8, 2014) was an American guitarist, harmonica player, singer, songwriter, and record producer who was best known as a founding member and guitarist of the rock band the Youngbloods.

== Career ==
Corbitt was born in Tifton, Georgia. He began his career in Cambridge, Massachusetts, at the beginning of the 1960s as a bluegrass musician, then was known as a folk singer. In mid-1960s, Corbitt met Jesse Colin Young, a moderately successful folk singer born in Queens, New York City. In January 1965, the two began touring in Canada as a duo, eventually naming themselves the Youngbloods. Young played bass, and Corbitt played piano, harmonica and lead guitar. Later on, they were joined by Corbitt's friend Lowell "Banana" Levinger, a bluegrass musician, and the drummer Joe Bauer.

In 1967, having signed with RCA Records, they released their first Billboard 200 album, The Youngbloods. Its single "Get Together", did not sell well, reach number 62 on the Billboard Hot 100. Rereleased in 1969, it peaked at number 5.

For the Youngbloods, he wrote or co-wrote "Dreamer's Dream" (with Levinger) and "Don't Play Games" (on the 1967 album Earth Music), "Rain Song (Don't Let the Rain Bring You Down)" (with Felix Pappalardi and Gail Collins Pappalardi) (on the 1969 album Elephant Mountain). His song "Life Goes On" (co-written with Charlie Daniels) was included on the 1970 album Charlie Daniels.

In 1969, Corbitt left the Youngbloods for a solo career, before the band recorded the album Elephant Mountain. In 1971, Corbitt and former Youngbloods producer Charlie Daniels formed the duo Corbitt & Daniels.

Corbitt played bass guitar on and produced Don McLean's 1970 debut album, Tapestry. Corbitt played electric guitar and acoustic guitar on the 1971 debut album by the Canadian singer-songwriter David Wiffen, entitled David Wiffen. He produced and played guitar on singer-songwriter Janis Ian’s 1971 album Present Company.

Corbitt moved into production, and worked with artists including Pete Seeger, Buffy Sainte-Marie, Janis Ian, Charlie McCoy, Ramblin’ Jack Elliot, Joy of Cooking, Sonny Terry and Brownie McGee.

== Death ==
Corbitt, a resident of Smiley, Texas, died of lung cancer on March 8, 2014. He was 71.
