= Darkness, Darkness =

1969 song by Jesse Colin Young

Single by The Youngbloods

from the album Elephant Mountain
- B-side: "On Sir Francis Drake"
- Released: April 1969
- Genre: Folk rock, psychedelic folk
- Length: 3:53
- Label: RCA Victor
- Songwriter: Jesse Colin Young
- Producer: Charles E. Daniels

The Youngbloods singles chronology
"Quicksand" (1968)	"Darkness, Darkness" (1969)	"Get Together" (1969)

"Darkness, Darkness" is a song written by Jesse Colin Young in 1969, which has been covered by many artists. Young's band The Youngbloods released a version on their 1969 album Elephant Mountain. They released a version of the song as a single twice: in 1969, which reached #124 on the Billboard chart, and in 1970, which reached #86 on the chart. The violin was played by David Lindley. Screaming Trees covered the song for 1994s True Lies soundtrack. It was also covered by Richie Havens in 1994 on his album “Cuts To The Chase.” Robert Plant released a version of the song as a single in 2002 that reached #27 on the rock chart. It was featured on his 2002 album Dreamland. Eric Burdon released his cover in 1980.
