= IYC =

IYC may refer to:

- Ijaw Youth Council, a civil rights organization in Nigeria
- Indian Youth Congress, a body of the Indian National Congress Party
- International Year of Chemistry, a United Nations year of observance
- Inverness Yacht Club (California), a pleasure boating club located in Inverness, California
- Island Yacht Club, in Toronto, Ontario Canada
- Isha Yoga Centre, an ashram near Coimbatore, Tamil Nadu India, run by Isha Foundation
