= Hog Island (Tomales Bay) =

Island in Marin County, California, United States

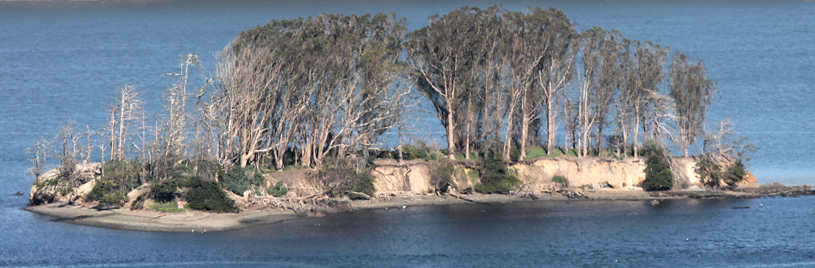
- Hog Island in 2014, viewed from the west

- Location within California Location within the United States

Geography
- Location: West Marin
- Coordinates: 38°11′50″N 122°56′09″W
- Total islands: 1

Administration
- United States
- State: California
- County: Marin County, California
- Governing body: Point Reyes National Seashore

Hog Island is an island roughly 2 acres (0.8 ha) in size located approximately 5 mi (8 km) south of the entrance to Tomales Bay in the West Marin area of Marin County, California.

While waters to its west are deep enough for small ships to enter Tomales Bay, at low tide the shallows to the east may be wadeable to the eastern shore of the bay. Unsuspecting vessels have run aground in that region a number of times. However, as it is some distance from the mouth of Tomales Bay, Hog Island does not experience the large sudden waves that characterize the Tomales Bay Bar entrance region.

The name Hog Island reportedly came from a wild 1870s incident, in which a barge carrying a load of pigs caught fire and was grounded on the island to avoid sinking—at which point the pigs escaped onto the island until they were rounded up again. The island lends its name to the Hog Island Oyster Company, which produces shellfish on Tomales Bay, several miles south of Hog Island.

The San Andreas Fault runs through the center of Tomales Bay, past Hog Island. Local legend claims that Hog Island and nearby Duck Island (also known as "Piglet") were once connected, but separated as a result of the 1906 San Francisco earthquake. While land deeds from the 1880s indicate that the two islands were separate before the earthquake, the two islands are (and have been) intermittently linked by a sand spit exposed at low tide.

The Inverness Yacht Club hosts an annual sailboat race around the island. Competing boats sail from the club, around the island, and back to the club again.

== Ownership ==
Sometime around 1885, the United States government sold Hog Island to one Christian Kuschert, a German immigrant. In 1902, Kuschert gave the island to his sister Catherine and her husband, Henry Siemsen. Within a year, the Siemsens sold the island to an N.W. Mallery, who lost the property in 1909 as a result of bankruptcy. Clara Windsor bought the property through the bankruptcy court proceedings for $800. The island appears on a 1916 map of the area produced by the United States Geological Survey.

In 1969, Michael and Annabelle Gahagan purchased the island from Ms Windsor. The next year, the Gahagans became publishers of the Point Reyes Light, the regional weekly newspaper. They sold Hog Island to Audubon Canyon Ranch in 1972, who used it as a bird sanctuary. Due to difficulties managing the island, the Audubon Canyon Ranch donated Hog Island to the Point Reyes National Seashore in 1996.

The island is now uninhabited, but remains of a structure and a small pier show evidence of prior human habitation. The island is a pupping ground for Harbor seals, so access is restricted during pupping season.

== See also ==
- List of islands of California
