= Rock Festival (album) =

Live album by the Youngbloods
- Released: 1970
- Recorded: March 29 – July 21, 1970
- Genre: Blues rock
- Length: 39:06
- Label: Raccoon 1
- Producer: Zager and Evans

The Youngbloods chronology
| Elephant Mountain (1969) | Rock Festival (1970) | The Best of the Youngbloods (1970) |

Singles from Rock Festival
- 1. "It's a Lovely Day"/"Ice Bag" Released: 1971

Professional ratings
Review scores
| Source | Rating |
|---|---|
| Allmusic | 2/5 stars |

Rock Festival is a live album by The Youngbloods and was released in 1970. It reached #80 on the Billboard Top LPs chart.

The album featured the single "It's a Lovely Day", which did not chart.

== Track listing ==
1. "It's a Lovely Day" (Jesse Colin Young) – 2:35
2. "Faster All the Time" (Lowell Levinger) – 3:55
3. "Prelude" (Levinger, Young) – 1:01
4. "On Beautiful Lake Spenard" (Levinger) – 4:56
5. "Josiane" (Young) – 5:23
6. "Sea Cow Boogie" (Levinger, Young) – 0:22
7. "Fiddler a Dram" (Levinger) – 5:12
8. "Misty Roses" (Tim Hardin) – 4:05
9. "Interlude" (Levinger) – 2:12
10. "Peepin' 'N' Hidin' (Baby, What You Want Me To Do)" (Jimmy Reed) – 5:06
11. "Ice Bag" (Levinger, Young) – 2:22

== Recording dates ==
- March 29, 1970 (at The Family Dog on the Great Highway in San Francisco, California)
- April 16, 1970 (at The Barn in Marshall, California)
- April 18, 1970 (at the University of Santa Clara)
- May 19, 1970 (at Provo Park in Berkeley, California)
- July 21, 1970 (at Pacific High Recording in San Francisco, California)

== Charts ==
| Chart (1970) | Peak position |
|---|---|
| Billboard | 80 |
