= The Youngbloods (album) =

1966 studio album by the Youngbloods

Studio album by the Youngbloods
- Released: January 1967
- Recorded: Late 1966
- Studios: RCA Victor, New York City
- Genres: Folk rock; pop
- Length: 33:38
- Label: RCA Victor
- Producer: Felix Pappalardi

The Youngbloods chronology
The Youngbloods (1967)	Earth Music (1968)

Singles from The Youngbloods
- 1. "Grizzly Bear" / "Tears Are Falling" Released: November 1966; 2. "Get Together" Released: July 1967

The Youngbloods is the debut studio album by the American rock band the Youngbloods. Released in January 1967, the album peaked at number 131 on the Billboard 200. Two years later, the single "Get Together" reached number five and sold more than a million copies. The album was reissued in 1971 under the title Get Together.

== History ==
"Get Together" was written by Chet Powers (aka Dino Valenti of Quicksilver Messenger Service) and had already appeared in 1963 on the album 12 String Guitar! Vol. 2 by the Folkswingers and in 1966 as a track on the first album by the Jefferson Airplane. Upon first release as a single by The Youngbloods in 1967, it only went to No. 62 in the pop charts. Two years later, after being featured in radio and television commercials, the track was re-released and climbed to number 5 in charts, selling more than a million records.

The first song on the album, "Grizzly Bear" (spelled "Grizzely Bear" on the album cover), was also released as a single reaching No. 52 on the pop charts in December 1966. Jerry Corbitt took credit for writing this song, but it had appeared on a 1928 recording by singer-songwriter Jim Jackson. The song featured the "jug band" style popularized by The Lovin' Spoonful, Jim Kweskin Jug Band and other similar groups of the middle 1960s. The title refers to a popular dance style of the 1910s. Corbitt also wrote the second song on the LP, the ballad "All Over the World (La La)". Side one also featured Blind Willie McTell's "Statesboro Blues" and another ballad, "One Note Man" written by fellow Cambridge folk musician Paul Arnoldi (spelled "Arnaldi" on the record label).

Side Two featured two more songs written by fellow folk singer-songwriters, Fred Neil's "The Other Side of This Life" and "Four in the Morning" by George "Robin" Remailly (who became a member of the Holy Modal Rounders in the 1970s).

Jesse Colin Young wrote two ballads on side two, "Tears Are Falling" and "Foolin' Around (The Waltz)" which alternates between 4/4 and 3/4 time signatures. Classical cello was added to "Foolin' Around" by George Ricci. Side two ends with two blues standards, Jimmy Reed's "Ain't That Lovin' You" and Mississippi John Hurt's "C.C. Rider". The last song featured a hard-rocking guitar jam that was common in the late 1960s, especially for San Francisco, which would soon become the Youngbloods' destination both geographically and musically.

== Legacy ==
Professional ratings
Review scores
Source	Rating
AllMusic	4.5/5 stars
The Rolling Stone Record Guide	3/5 stars

Richie Unterberger, in a retrospective review for AllMusic, feels "they would have been better off leaving the blues alone"; though he regards the rest of the material as "good" and calls the album an "engaging debut".

== Track listing ==
=== Side one ===
1. "Grizzly Bear" (Jerry Corbitt) – 2:20
2. "All Over the World (La-La)" (Corbitt) – 3:13
3. "Statesboro Blues" (Blind Willie McTell) – 2:18
4. "Get Together" (Chet Powers) – 4:39
5. "One Note Man" (Paul Arnoldi) – 2:24

=== Side two ===
1. "The Other Side of This Life" (Fred Neil) – 2:28
2. "Tears Are Falling" (Jesse Colin Young) – 2:25
3. "Four in the Morning" (George Remailly) – 2:51
4. "Foolin' Around (The Waltz)" (Young) – 2:50
5. "Ain't That Lovin' You, Baby" (Jimmy Reed) – 2:39
6. "C.C. Rider" (Mississippi John Hurt) – 2:37

== Personnel ==
The Youngbloods

- Jesse Colin Young – bass, lead vocals, rhythm guitar
- Jerry Corbitt – rhythm guitar, backing vocals
- Lowell "Banana" Levinger – lead guitar, electric piano
- Joe Bauer – drums, percussion

with:

- George Ricci – cello on "Foolin' Around"

Technical

- Felix Pappalardi – producer
- Bob Cullen – recording supervision
- Mike Moran – engineer
- Mickey Crofford – engineer
- Ray Hall – engineer

== Charts ==
Chart (1967)	Peak position
Billboard	131

Singles

Year	Single	Chart	Position
1966	"Grizzly Bear"	Billboard Hot 100	52
1967	"Get Together"	Billboard Hot 100	62
1967	"Get Together"	Adult Contemporary Chart	37
1969	"Get Together"	Billboard Hot 100	5
