= Earth Music =

Studio album by the Youngbloods
- Released: October 1967
- Studio: RCA Victor, New York City
- Genre: Folk rock; pop
- Length: 33:04
- Label: RCA Victor
- Producer: Felix Pappalardi, The Youngbloods

The Youngbloods chronology
The Youngbloods (1967)	Earth Music (1967)	Elephant Mountain (1969)

Singles from Earth Music
- 1. "Euphoria"/"The Wine Song" Released: May 1967; 2. "Fool Me"/"I Can Tell" Released: October 1967

Earth Music is the second studio album by the American rock band the Youngbloods, released in 1967. The album did not succeed, failing to chart.

Similar to their first album, the songs were a mix of originals and covers, ballads and rockers. Jesse Colin Young wrote three of the songs alone, the ballad "All My Dreams Blue", the hard rocking "Long and Tall", and the humorous "The Wine Song". Jerry Corbitt contributed the ballad "Don't Play Games" which features a string section, and co-wrote "Dreamer's Dream" with Banana. "Fool Me", written by Banana, is a bass-heavy song more similar to "garage rock" of the middle 1960s than the folkier material normally associated with the Youngbloods.

Cover songs on the album include "Euphoria", a song originally done by the Holy Modal Rounders and written by George "Robin" Remailly (who later became a member of the Rounders). Other covers included two fifties classics, Chuck Berry's "Too Much Monkey Business" and Chuck Willis's "I Can Tell". Tim Hardin's "Reason to Believe " was one of the earliest cover versions of the popular ballad. "Sugar Babe," erroneously credited to Young/Lomax, is a folk song about gambling and drinking that had been printed in American Ballads and Folk Songs, by John A. Lomax and his son Alan Lomax, published in 1934. In a note below "Sugar Babe," the Lomaxes state: "words and melody reprinted from the second volume of English Folk Songs of the Southern Appalachians, collected by Cecil Sharp, edited by Maud Karpeles." That book was published in 1932. The Youngbloods version of "Sugar Babe" was included in the soundtrack album for Michelangelo Antonioni's 1970 film Zabriskie Point.

== Legacy ==
Professional ratings
Review scores
Source	Rating
Allmusic	3/5 stars

In a retrospective review for Allmusic, Lindsay Planer calls the album "a blend of captivating songwriting with an infectiously fun delivery" and feels that there are "a handful of equally definitive sides scattered throughout Earth Music."

== Track listing ==
Side One
No.	Title	Writer(s)	Lead vocals	Length
1.	"Euphoria"	George Remailly	Jesse Colin Young with Jerry Corbitt	2:15
2.	"All My Dreams Blue"	Jesse Colin Young	Corbitt and Lowell Levinger	3:17
3.	"Monkey Business"	Chuck Berry	Levinger	2:49
4.	"Dreamer's Dream"	Corbitt; Levinger	Corbitt and Young with Levinger	3:35
5.	"Sugar Babe"	Young; Alan Lomax	Young with Corbitt	2:08
6.	"Long and Tall"	Young	Young	4:05

Side Two
No.	Title	Writer(s)	Lead vocals	Length
7.	"I Can Tell"	Chuck Willis	Young	4:29
8.	"Don't Play Games"	Corbitt	Corbitt with Young	2:12
9.	"The Wine Song"	Young	Young with Corbitt and Levinger	2:24
10.	"Fool Me"	Levinger	Levinger with Young	2:57
11.	"Reason to Believe"	Tim Hardin	Young with Corbitt	2:25

== Personnel ==
The Youngbloods

- Lowell "Banana" Levinger – lead guitar, piano; finger cymbals (track 1), backing vocals (tracks 2, 4, 9, 11), lead vocals (tracks 3, 10), pedal steel guitar (tracks 5, 11)
- Jerry Corbitt – rhythm guitar, harmonica; lead vocals (tracks 1, 4, 8), backing vocals (tracks 2, 5, 8, 10), lead guitar (track 10)
- Jesse Colin Young – bass; lead vocals (tracks 2, 5–7, 9, 11), backing vocals (tracks 1, 4, 8, 10)
- Joe Bauer – drums

Technical

- Tracks 2, 3, 5, and 6 on Side 1, and track 5 on Side 2 were produced by The Youngbloods
- Tracks 1–4 on Side 2 were produced by Felix Pappalardi
- Tracks 1 and 4 on Side 1 were produced by Felix Pappalardi and the Youngbloods
- Bob Cullen – production supervisor
- Mike Moran – engineer
- Mickey Crofford – engineer
