= Elephant Mountain =

Studio album by the Youngbloods
- Released: April 1969
- Studios: RCA (Hollywood, California)
- Genres: Folk rock; country rock; psychedelia
- Length: 40:06
- Label: RCA Victor
- Producers: Charlie Daniels, The Youngbloods, Bob Cullen

The Youngbloods chronology
Earth Music (1967)	Elephant Mountain (1969)	Rock Festival (1970)

Singles from Elephant Mountain
- 1. "Quicksand"/"Dreamer's Dream" Released: January 1968; 2. "Darkness, Darkness"/"On Sir Francis Drake" Released: April 1969; 3. "Sunlight"/"Trillium" Released: November 1969; 4. "Darkness, Darkness"/"On Sir Francis Drake" Released: April 1970

Elephant Mountain is the third studio album by the American rock band The Youngbloods, released in 1969. It reached number 118 on the Billboard 200 chart.

== Background and recording ==
With the departure of member and co-founder Jerry Corbitt, Jesse Colin Young became the primary songwriter of the band, penning seven of the 13 tracks on the album, and co-writing four more with Lowell "Banana" Levinger and Joe Bauer. The four tracks credited to Young, Banana, and Bauer are all instrumentals.

Levinger's "On Sir Francis Drake" is an instrumental named after Sir Francis Drake Boulevard of Marin County, where the band had recently moved. At 6:44 it is the longest track on the album, consisting of two sections, the first an electric piano-based waltz, the second a blues jam with some bass soloing by Young. The only other song on the album not co-written by Young is "Rain Song (Don't Let the Rain Bring You Down)", which is similar to their earlier "jug band" style songs like "Euphoria" and "The Wine Song"; it was co-written by Jerry Corbitt, Felix Pappalardi and Gail Collins, his wife.

According to the liner notes on the Sundazed reissue, the album was "begun in New York early in 1967, then finished in RCA's Hollywood studios after the band moved to San Francisco, but not released until 1969." Liner notes writer Jud Cost mentions that original member, Jerry Corbitt, though uncredited in the liner notes, performs "on a couple of Elephant Mountain tracks, notably singing the vocal with Young on 'Smug'."

Unlike their previous albums, there are no covers of songs by other artists.

The album was included in the book 1001 Albums You Must Hear Before You Die.

Although not specified on the album cover, the mountain depicted is Black Mountain (locally called Elephant Mountain), located west of the Nicasio Reservoir in Marin County.

Sundazed released a remastered version in 2008 with "Previously Unissued Bonus Tracks," including "Pool Hall Song" and "Beautiful" (alternate version).

In 2014, RCA of Japan released a 19 track version of the album.

== Composition and music ==
The album's style is characterized as "blending affective pop/rock melodies and lyrics with their good time jug band roots." Jesse Colin Young's basslines are described as "propulsive" and Joe Bauer's drum work is described as "nimble." The album makes use of electric piano and harpsichord. Some of the material present on the album has been described as "jazzy." The album's third track, "On Sir Francis Drake," is an instrumental, and the ninth track "Trillium" employs musical improvisation from the band. "Sham" is described as a "straightforward rocker," drawing comparisons to other Bay Area music acts such as Stoneground. "Ride the Wind" takes stylistic cues from Latin music.

== Critical reception ==
Professional ratings
Review scores
Source	Rating
AllMusic	4.5/5 stars
The Village Voice	C+

Reviewing for The Village Voice in 1969, Robert Christgau wrote, "In the manner of tight groups, the Youngbloods stretch thinner all the time. Not only have they lost Jerry Corbitt, but their own expertise has become somehow attenuated. Banana used to be the most tasteful electric pianist in rock. Now he has become so tasteful he can sound like Roy Kral on a lazy night." Lester Bangs was more enthusiastic in Rolling Stone, saying "this is one of the most encouraging albums I have heard in months. ... This album exudes that supremely rare commodity in these dark, bored, destructive times – joy."

Years later, Rolling Stone said the album "bridges the gap between the last days of psychedelia and the outbreak of country-rock that had afflicted artists like the Byrds and Neil Young." In a retrospective review for AllMusic, Lindsay Planer praised the album, and gave the album four and a half stars out of five, feeling that it "contains some of the band's strongest material to date". The New York Times described the album as their "1969 folk-rock touchstone".

== Track listing ==
=== Side one ===
1. "Darkness, Darkness" (Jesse Colin Young) – 3:51
2. "Smug" (Young) – 2:13
3. "On Sir Francis Drake" (Lowell Levinger) – 6:44
4. "Sunlight" (Young) – 3:07
5. "Double Sunlight" (Levinger, Young, Joe Bauer) – 0:41
6. "Beautiful" (Young) – 3:49
7. "Turn It Over" (Levinger, Young, Bauer) – 0:15

=== Side two ===
1. "Rain Song (Don't Let the Rain Bring You Down)" (Jerry Corbitt, Felix Pappalardi, Gail Collins) – 3:13
2. "Trillium" (Levinger, Young, Bauer) – 3:08
3. "Quicksand"* (Young) – 2:41
4. "Black Mountain Breakdown" (Levinger, Young, Bauer) – 0:40
5. "Sham"* (Young) – 2:44
6. "Ride the Wind" (Young) – 6:37

== Sundazed 2008 Reissue ==
1. "Darkness, Darkness" (Jesse Colin Young) – 3:51
2. "Smug" (Young) – 2:13
3. "On Sir Francis Drake" (Lowell Levinger) – 6:44
4. "Sunlight" (Young) – 3:07
5. "Double Sunlight" (Levinger, Young, Joe Bauer) – 0:41
6. "Beautiful" (Young) – 3:49
7. "Turn It Over" (Levinger, Young, Bauer) – 0:15
8. "Rain Song (Don't Let the Rain Bring You Down)" (Corbitt, Pappalardi, Collins) – 3:13
9. "Trillium" (Levinger, Young, Bauer) – 3:08
10. "Quicksand"* (Young) – 2:41
11. "Black Mountain Breakdown" (Levinger, Young, Bauer) – 0:40
12. "Sham"* (Young) – 2:44
13. "Ride the Wind" (Young) – 6:37
14. "Pool Hall Song" (Michael Hurley) (mis-credited to Jesse Colin Young) – 3:04
15. "Beautiful" (Alternate Version) (Young) – 9:31

== RCA Japan 2014 Reissue ==
1. "Darkness, Darkness" (Jesse Colin Young) – 3:51
2. "Smug" (Young) – 2:13
3. "On Sir Francis Drake" (Lowell Levinger) – 6:44
4. "Sunlight" (Young) – 3:07
5. "Double Sunlight" (Levinger, Young, Joe Bauer) – 0:41
6. "Beautiful" (Young) – 3:49
7. "Turn It Over" (Levinger, Young, Bauer) – 0:15
8. "Rain Song (Don't Let the Rain Bring You Down)" (Corbitt, Pappalardi, Collins) – 3:13
9. "Trillium" (Levinger, Young, Bauer) – 3:08
10. "Quicksand"* (Young) – 2:41
11. "Black Mountain Breakdown" (Levinger, Young, Bauer) – 0:40
12. "Sham"* (Young) – 2:44
13. "Ride the Wind" (Young) – 6:37
14. "Pool Hall Song" (Michael Hurley) (mis-credited to Jesse Colin Young) – 3:09
15. "On Sir Francis Drake" (Single Version) – 3:04
16. "Beautiful" (Alternate Version) – 8:26
17. "Smug" (Alternate Mono Version) – 2:14
18. "Sham" (Alternate Mono Version) – 2:46
19. "Radio Spot For Elephant Mountain" – 1:08

Tracks 17 "Smug" is a mono mix of the regular album version.

== Personnel ==
The Youngbloods

- Jesse Colin Young – bass, lead vocals, acoustic guitar on "Sunlight"
- Lowell "Banana" Levinger – guitar, backing vocals, electric piano
- Joe Bauer – drums

Additional musicians

- Jerry Corbitt – guitar and vocals (uncredited in original liner notes)
- David Lindley – violin
- Plas Johnson – tenor saxophone
- Joe Clayton – trumpet
- Victor Feldman – vibraphone

Technical

- Charles E. Daniels (Charlie Daniels) – producer
- The Youngbloods and Bob Cullen – producer (Tracks marked *. These two tracks were recorded prior to Jerry Corbitt's departure from the band.)
- Richie Schmidt – engineer
- Hank Cicalo – engineer
- Mickey Crofford – engineer

== Charts ==
Album

Chart (1969)	Peak position
Billboard	118

Singles

Year	Single	Chart	Position
1969	"Darkness, Darkness"	Billboard Hot 100	124
1969	"Sunlight"	Billboard Hot 100	114
1970	"Darkness, Darkness"	Billboard Hot 100	86
