= Charlie Daniels (album) =

Studio album by Charlie Daniels
- Released: 1970
- Studios: Woodland Studios, East Nashville, Tennessee
- Genres: Southern rock; hard rock; blues; country rock
- Length: 37:13
- Label: Capitol
- Producers: Jerry Corbitt, Dave Nives

Charlie Daniels chronology
Charlie Daniels (1970)	Te John, Grease, & Wolfman (1972)

Charlie Daniels is the debut album of American musician Charlie Daniels. It was released in 1970 courtesy of Capitol Records.

== Track listing ==
Side one

No.	Title	Writer(s)	Length
1.	"Great Big Bunches of Love"	Daniels	3:26
2.	"Little Boy Blue"	Daniels	4:31
3.	"Ain't No Way"	Daniels	3:31
4.	"Don't Let Your Man Find Out"	Daniels	3:17
5.	"Trudy"	Daniels	4:10

Side two

No.	Title	Writer(s)	Length
1.	"Long Long Way (Back Home)"	Daniels	4:11
2.	"Georgia"	Daniels	3:23
3.	"The Pope and the Dope"	Daniels	2:34
4.	"Life Goes On"	Jerry Corbitt, Daniels	2:47
5.	"Thirty-Nine Miles From Mobile"	Daniels	5:23

== Personnel ==
- Charlie Daniels - guitar, fiddle, vocals
- Bob Wilson - keyboards
- Jerry Corbitt - guitar, harmony vocals
- Ben Keith - steel guitar, slide guitar
- Billy Cox - bass
- Tim Drummond - bass
- Earl Grigsby - bass, vocals
- Karl Himmel - drums
- Jeffrey Myer - drums

Technical

- Ernie Winfrey, Rex Collier - engineer
- Rich Schmitt - remixing

== Critical reception ==
Professional ratings
Review scores
Source	Rating
Allmusic	5/5 stars

Charlie Daniels received five stars out of five from Stephen Thomas Erlewine of Allmusic. Erlewine concludes that "he's [Charlie Daniels] a redneck rebel, not fitting into either the country or the rock & roll of 1970 with his record, but, in retrospect, he sounds like a visionary, pointing the way to the future when southern rockers saw no dividing lines between rock, country, and blues, and only saw it all as sons of the south. That's what he achieves with Charlie Daniels -- a unique Southern sound that's quintessentially American, sounding at once new and timeless. Once he formed the Charlie Daniels Band, he became a star and with Fire on the Mountain, he had another classic, but he would never sound as wild, unpredictable, or as much like a maverick as he does on this superb album.".
