= Inverness, California =

Inverness
- Unincorporated community Census-designated place
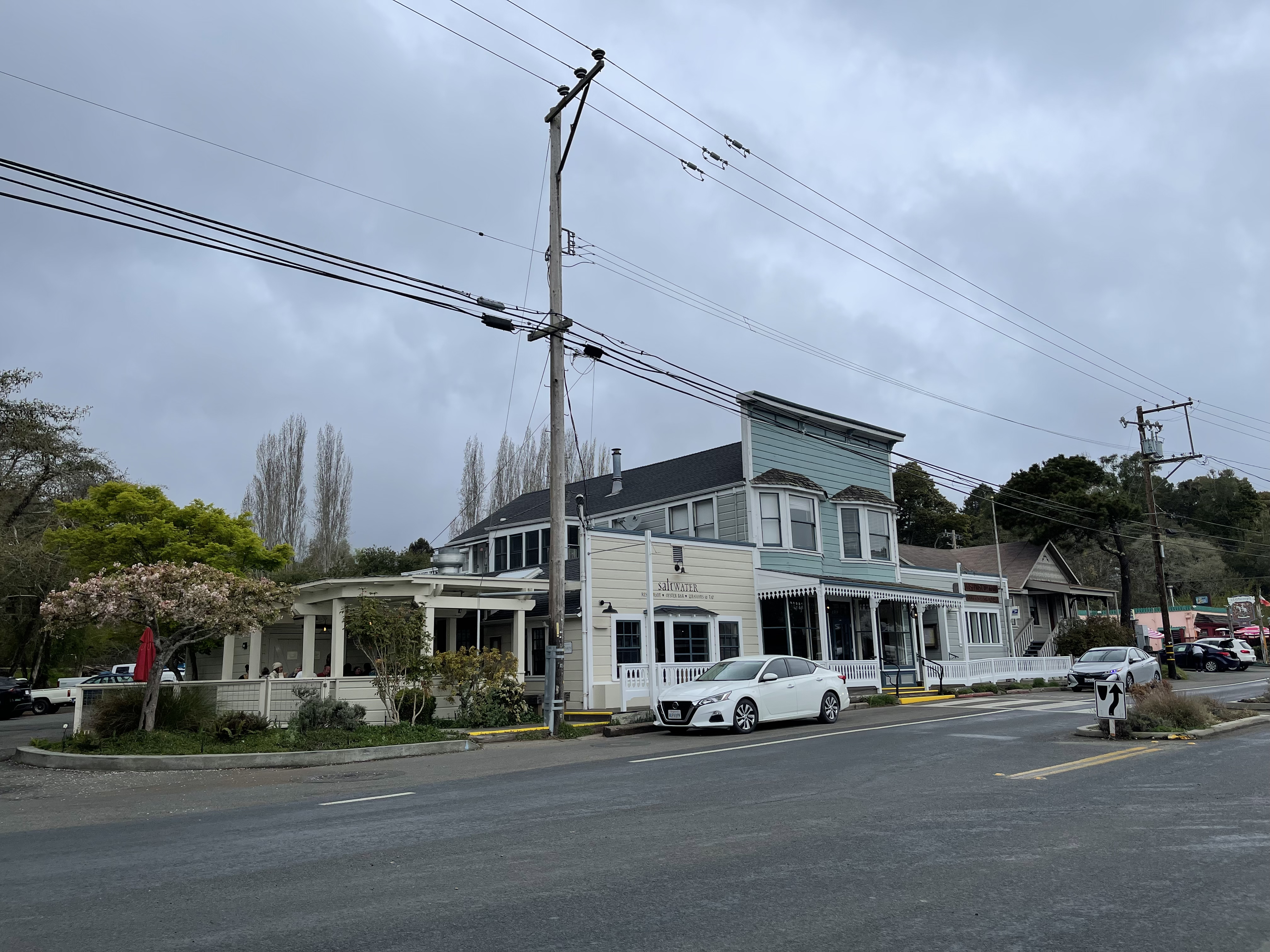
- Inverness in 2022

- Location in Marin County and the state of California

- Location in the United States
- Coordinates: 38°06′04″N 122°51′25″W
- Country: United States
- State: California
- County: Marin

Government
  - County Board: District 4 Dennis Rodoni
  - State senator: Mike McGuire (D)
  - Assemblymember: Damon Connolly (D)
  - U. S. rep.: Jared Huffman (D)

Area
  - Total: 6.836 sq mi (17.71 km^{2})
  - Land: 6.400 sq mi (16.58 km^{2})
  - Water: 0.436 sq mi (1.13 km^{2}) 6.38%
- Elevation: 43 ft (13 m)

Population (2020)
  - Total: 1,379
  - Density: 215.5/sq mi (83.2/km^{2})
- Time zone: UTC-8 (PST)
  - Summer (DST): UTC-7 (PDT)
- ZIP code: 94937
- Area codes: 415/628
- FIPS code: 06-36616
- GNIS feature ID: 1658827

Inverness is an unincorporated community in western Marin County, California, United States. It is located on the southwestern shore of Tomales Bay, 3.5 miles (5.6 kilometers) northwest of Point Reyes Station and approximately 40 miles (65 km) via road northwest of San Francisco, at an elevation of 43 feet (13 meters). For statistical purposes, the United States Census Bureau has defined Inverness as a census-designated place (CDP). In the 2020 census, the population was 1,379. The community was named by a Scottish landowner after Inverness in Scotland.

== Community ==
Inverness is located on the west shore of Tomales Bay, which runs southeast along the line of the San Andreas Fault. Surrounded by Point Reyes National Seashore, it is primarily a residential community, with little industry other than tourism. It has a small downtown area with a general store, post office, library, two restaurants, one gift shop and a coffee shop. A third restaurant is located a short way north of downtown. There are also a number of hotels and inns spread throughout the town.

One aspect of the town is a concentration of recreational (and some commercial) boating. There is a small public marina, a few private piers, and the Inverness Yacht Club.

Portions of the John Carpenter film The Fog as well as most of his film Village of the Damned were shot in and around Inverness. In 1970, American singer and songwriter Jesse Colin Young moved his home and recording studio to Inverness. In 1993, Young and his wife Connie founded Ridgetop Music, a label based out of their home in Inverness.

== History ==
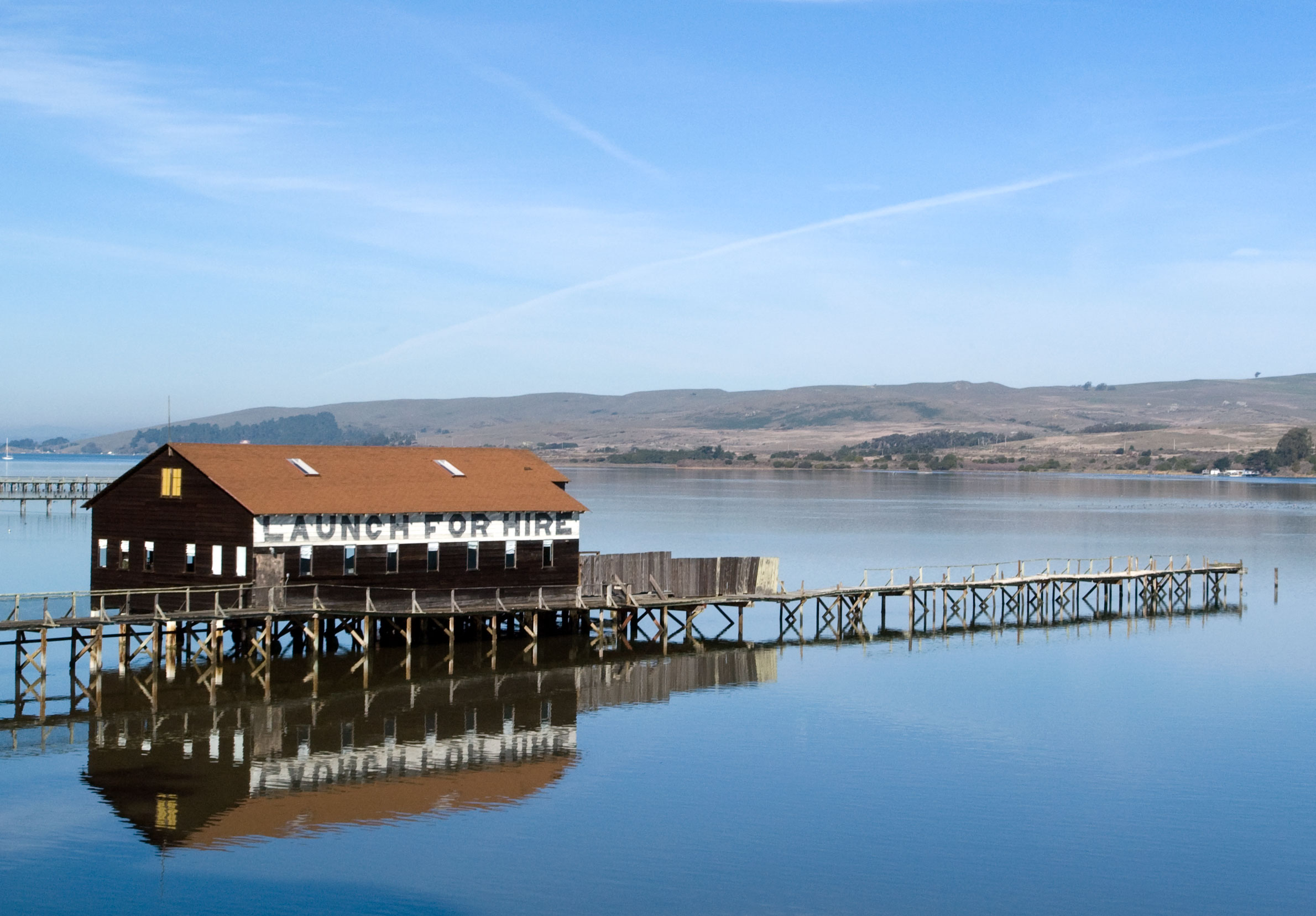
Brock Schreiber Boathouse on Tomales Bay

The town is about 5 miles (8 km) northeast of Drakes Bay on the Pacific Ocean, named after Sir Francis Drake, who explored the coast in the 16th century. Although Drake's official log was lost, the ship's doctor's log described landing in an area that reminded him of the White Cliffs of Dover. Drakes Bay is backed by similar-looking cliffs, leading many to believe this is where the ship landed.

The region became the property of James Shafter, who began to develop the property in the 1890s. It became a summer resort where people from San Francisco and Oakland came to camp, hike and swim in Tomales Bay. Many built small summer cabins that still exist today. Small steamboats took day trippers down the bay to secluded beaches. They left from Brock Schreiber's boathouse, which has been preserved and is a prominent local landmark with its prominent sign "Launch for Hire".

The first post office opened in 1897.

In 1995, Inverness Ridge was the site of the Mount Vision Fire, which burned a large area of Point Reyes National Seashore and a number of homes built on the ridge. The town itself was threatened but was saved by helicopters dipping water from Tomales Bay to drop on the Bishop pine forest between the town and the burning ridgetop.

== Geography ==
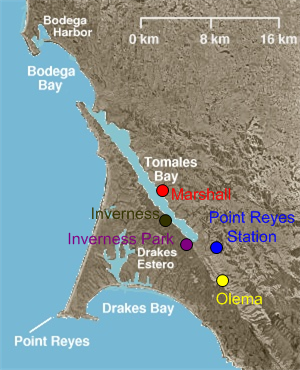
Towns of West Marin County, California

Inverness is located at 38°06′04″N 122°51′25″W. According to the United States Census Bureau, the CDP has a total area of 6.8 square miles (18 km^{2}), of which 6.4 square miles (17 km^{2}) are land and 0.4 square miles (1.0 km^{2}), or 6.38%, are water. The CDP includes the secondary community of Inverness Park, southeast of Inverness proper. It is bordered to the east by Point Reyes Station.

The town is adjacent to the San Andreas Fault and is spread out along approximately 2 miles (3 km) of the western shore and valleys of Tomales Bay on the Point Reyes Peninsula. It provides services to visitors to the Point Reyes National Seashore and Tomales Bay State Park.

=== Climate ===
Inverness has a Mediterranean climate heavily influenced by the nearby Pacific Ocean, with cool, rainy winters and mild, dry summers. The community experiences a fairly narrow range of temperatures, due to its position only a few miles inland. The warmest month is actually September, a common pattern in the Bay Area due to the annual rollover in ocean currents.

Climate data for Inverness (1981-2010 normals)
Month	Jan	Feb	Mar	Apr	May	Jun	Jul	Aug	Sep	Oct	Nov	Dec	Year
Mean daily maximum °F (°C)	55.2 (12.9)	58.4 (14.7)	60.1 (15.6)	61.8 (16.6)	63.6 (17.6)	65.4 (18.6)	67.6 (19.8)	67.9 (19.9)	69.1 (20.6)	67.2 (19.6)	62.1 (16.7)	55.7 (13.2)	62.8 (17.1)
Daily mean °F (°C)	48.1 (8.9)	50.5 (10.3)	52.0 (11.1)	53.4 (11.9)	55.9 (13.3)	58.2 (14.6)	60.0 (15.6)	60.3 (15.7)	60.5 (15.8)	57.8 (14.3)	53.4 (11.9)	48.1 (8.9)	54.8 (12.7)
Mean daily minimum °F (°C)	41.1 (5.1)	42.7 (5.9)	43.8 (6.6)	45.0 (7.2)	48.2 (9.0)	50.9 (10.5)	52.3 (11.3)	52.8 (11.6)	51.8 (11.0)	48.5 (9.2)	44.6 (7.0)	40.5 (4.7)	46.9 (8.3)
Average precipitation inches (mm)	6.62 (168)	6.54 (166)	4.67 (119)	2.17 (55)	1.35 (34)	0.24 (6.1)	0.02 (0.51)	0.10 (2.5)	0.31 (7.9)	1.72 (44)	4.09 (104)	6.44 (164)	34.27 (870)
Source: PRISM Climate Group

== Demographics ==
Historical population
Census	Pop.	Note	%±
1990	1,422		—
2000	1,421		−0.1%
2010	1,304		−8.2%
2020	1,379		5.8%
U.S. Decennial Census; 1860–1870 1880-1890; 1900 1910 1920; 1930 1940 1950; 1960 1970 1980; 1990 2000 2010; 2020

Inverness first appeared as a census designated place in the 1990 U.S. census.

=== Racial and ethnic composition ===
Inverness CDP, California – Racial and ethnic composition Note: the US Census treats Hispanic/Latino as an ethnic category. This table excludes Latinos from the racial categories and assigns them to a separate category. Hispanics/Latinos may be of any race.
Race / Ethnicity (NH = Non-Hispanic)	Pop 2000	Pop 2010	Pop 2020	% 2000	% 2010	% 2020
White alone (NH)	1,292	1,172	1,166	90.92%	89.88%	84.55%
Black or African American alone (NH)	6	10	4	0.42%	0.77%	0.29%
Native American or Alaska Native alone (NH)	6	5	0	0.42%	0.38%	0.00%
Asian alone (NH)	16	16	23	1.13%	1.23%	1.67%
Native Hawaiian or Pacific Islander alone (NH)	0	2	8	0.00%	0.15%	0.58%
Other race alone (NH)	0	0	13	0.00%	0.00%	0.94%
Mixed race or Multiracial (NH)	20	20	71	1.41%	1.53%	5.15%
Hispanic or Latino (any race)	81	79	94	5.70%	6.06%	6.82%
Total	1,421	1,304	1,379	100.00%	100.00%	100.00%

=== 2020 census ===
As of the 2020 census, Inverness had a population of 1,379 and a population density of 215.5 inhabitants per square mile (83.2/km^{2}). The whole population lived in households. 0.0% of residents lived in urban areas, while 100.0% lived in rural areas.

There were 702 households, out of which 106 (15.1%) had children under the age of 18 living in them, 307 (43.7%) were married-couple households, 54 (7.7%) were cohabiting couple households, 208 (29.6%) had a female householder with no partner present, and 133 (18.9%) had a male householder with no partner present. 262 households (37.3%) were one person, and 146 (20.8%) were one person aged 65 or older. The average household size was 1.96. There were 369 families (52.6% of all households).

The age distribution was 155 people (11.2%) under the age of 18, 50 people (3.6%) aged 18 to 24, 200 people (14.5%) aged 25 to 44, 379 people (27.5%) aged 45 to 64, and 595 people (43.1%) who were 65 years of age or older. The median age was 61.1 years. For every 100 females, there were 90.7 males, and for every 100 females age 18 and over there were 91.0 males age 18 and over.

There were 1,085 housing units at an average density of 169.5 units per square mile (65.4 units/km^{2}), of which 702 (64.7%) were occupied. Of these, 456 (65.0%) were owner-occupied, and 246 (35.0%) were occupied by renters. Of all housing units, 35.3% were vacant. The homeowner vacancy rate was 0.9% and the rental vacancy rate was 4.7%.

== Education ==
Inverness is in the Shoreline Unified School District.
