= Jesse Colin Young =

American musician (1941–2025)

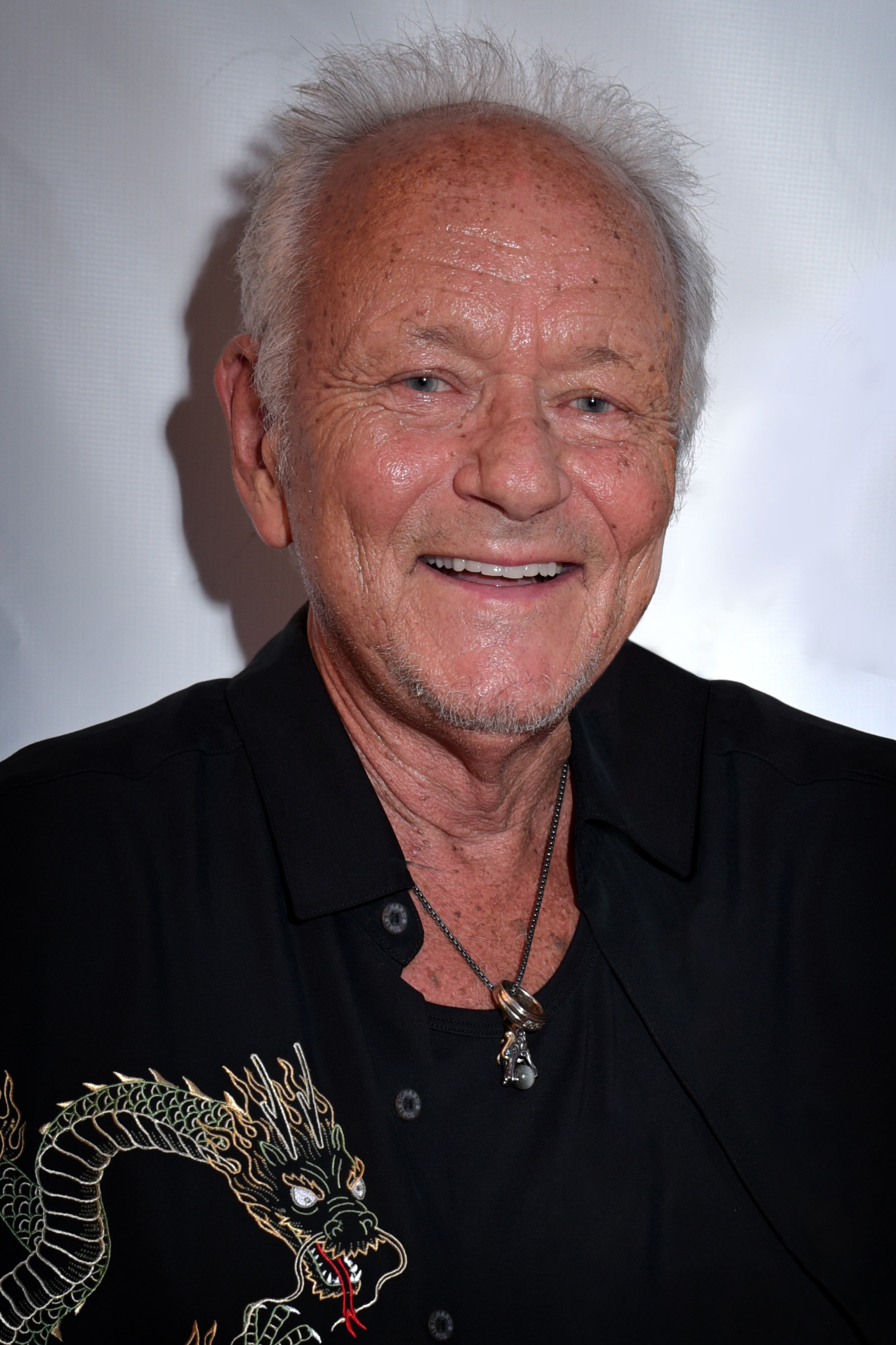
- Young in 2019

Background information
- Born: Perry Miller; November 22, 1941; New York City, U.S.
- Died: March 16, 2025 (aged 83) Aiken, South Carolina, U.S.
- Occupations: Singer-songwriter; musician
- Instruments: Vocals; bass; guitar
- Years active: 1960s–2012; 2016–2023
- Formerly of: The Youngbloods

Perry Miller (November 22, 1941 – March 16, 2025), known professionally as Jesse Colin Young, was an American singer and songwriter. He was a founding member and lead singer of the 1960s group the Youngbloods. After their dissolution in 1972, Young embarked on a solo career, releasing a series of albums through Warner Bros. Records, including Song for Juli (1973), Light Shine (1974), Songbird (1975), and the live album On the Road (1976). Young continued to release music in the 1980s with Elektra Records and Cypress Records, before deciding to release music through his personal label, Ridgetop Music, in 1993. After the Mount Vision Fire in 1995, Young relocated with his family to a coffee plantation in Hawaii, periodically releasing music. Young was diagnosed with chronic Lyme disease in 2012, and decided to retire from music. He began performing again in 2016 with his son Tristan, releasing a new album Dreamers in 2019 through BMG.

Young's song "Sunlight" was covered by Three Dog Night on their album Naturally (1970), and “Darkness, Darkness” by Robert Plant in 2002, which received a nomination for the Grammy Award for Best Male Rock Vocal Performance.

== Early life ==
Perry Miller was born on November 22, 1941, and raised in Queens, New York, to musical parents both originally from Lynn, Massachusetts. His mother, Doryce (Van Sciver), was a violinist and singer with perfect pitch, while his father, Fredrick Miller, was a Harvard-educated accountant. Both of his parents had a passion for classical music and he learned piano from a young age. In 1959, Young won a scholarship to attend Phillips Academy in Andover, Massachusetts, where he studied classical guitar; however, he was expelled from the strict academy. After finishing high school, Young enrolled in Ohio State University, where he broadened his musical tastes by living behind a record store. After a semester, Young returned to his parents' home in Pennsylvania, later transferring to New York University in 1961. Young balanced his studies with performances in Greenwich Village; however, he later decided to leave college and become a full-time musician. During this period, he decided on his stage name Jesse Colin Young as a blend of the names of outlaws Jesse James and Cole Younger, and Formula One design engineer and team owner Colin Chapman, as he felt like this was a more appropriate name for the music he performed.

Young met producer Bobby Scott in the early 1960s, who assisted Young in getting studio time. Young's debut album, The Soul of a City Boy, was released in 1964, the result of a four-hour recording session backed by an acoustic guitar. Young's cover of the George Remaily song "Four in the Morning" received some radio airplay, and in 1965 Young released a second album produced by Scott, Young Blood.

== The Youngbloods ==
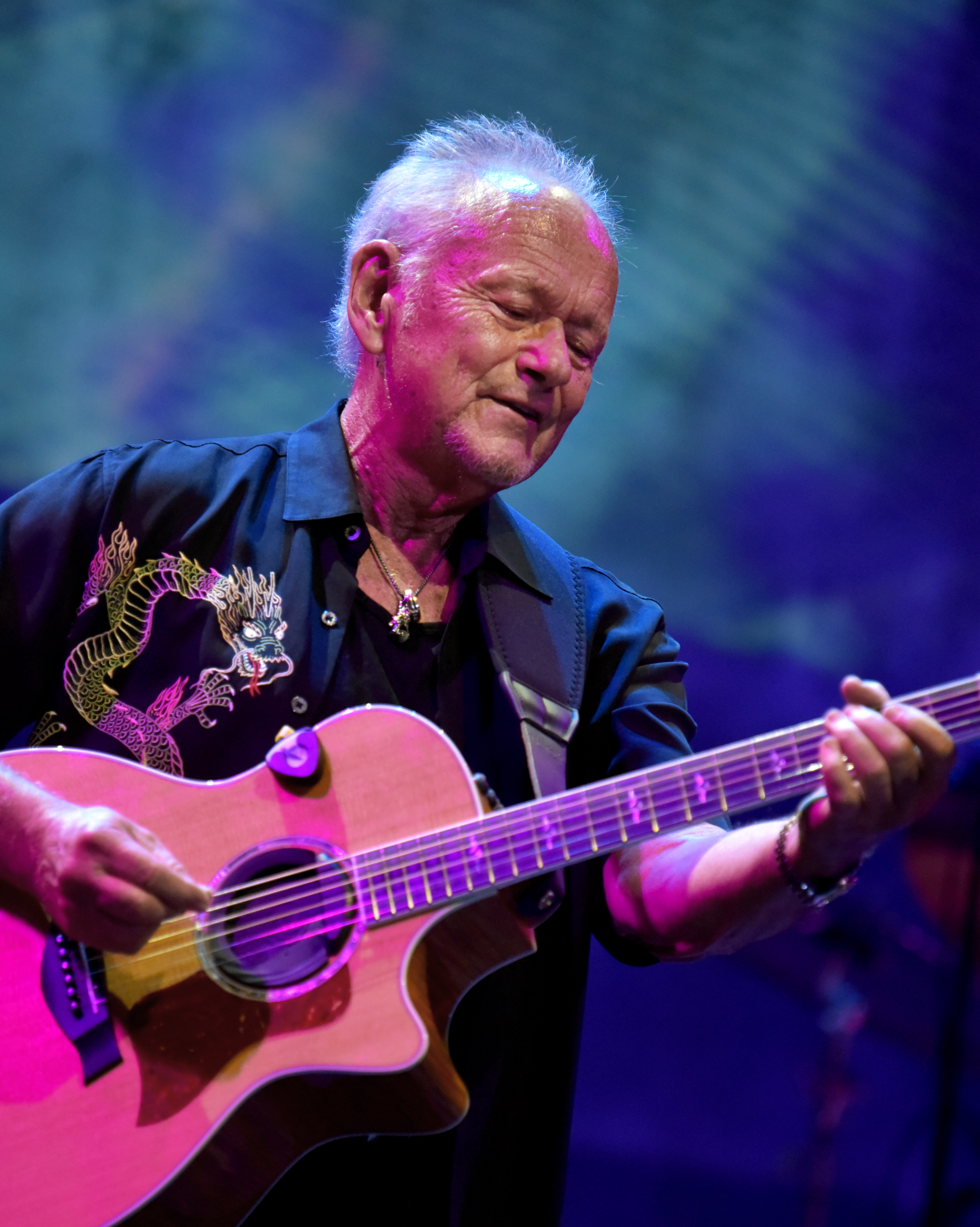
Jesse Colin Young performing in Los Angeles, California on July 3, 2019

Young met guitarist Jerry Corbitt, a folk singer from Cambridge, Massachusetts, and the pair decided to form a band as a duo called the Youngbloods (named after Young's sophomore album), touring Canada together. Eventually Corbitt's friend Lowell "Banana" Levinger (guitar and electric piano) and drummer Joe Bauer were added to the band, and the group became the house band for the Greenwich Village night club Cafe Au Go Go. During this period, Young switched from performing guitar to performing bass, as the band already had two guitar players. Signing to RCA Records, the band released their debut single "Grizzly Bear" in 1966, and their debut album The Youngbloods in 1967. The group's first album contained the song "Get Together", written by Chet Powers, and was released as a single in 1967 to moderate success; however, after its use in a 1969 public service commercial for the National Council of Christians and Jews, it became an international hit. Few of the band's early songs were written by Young: only "Tears Are Falling" and "Foolin' Around (The Waltz)" from their debut album, and four on their Felix Pappalardi-produced follow up album Earth Music (1967) (however, the B-sides of both issues of "Get Together" featured songs written by Young).

During the production stages of the band's third album, the Charlie Daniels-produced Elephant Mountain (1969) when the band moved from New York to California, Corbitt left the band, and Young became the group's main songwriter. The Young-penned singles from the album, "Sunlight" and "Darkness, Darkness", both became hits. "Sunlight" was covered the next year by Three Dog Night on their album Naturally (1970). The band formed their own imprint with Warner Bros. Records, Racoon Records, on which they began releasing music in the 1970s.

== Return to solo career ==
In 1970, Young built a recording studio next to his home in Inverness, California, where he began recording his solo album Together, released in 1972 through Warner Bros. Records. Due to the album's success, Young disbanded the Youngbloods after their final album in November 1972, High on a Ridge Top. Young's fourth solo album, Song for Juli (1973), was a sleeper hit, staying on the Billboard 200 for almost a year. Young toured his fifth album, Light Shine (1974), as an opening act for Crosby, Stills, Nash & Young. Young's third Warner album, Songbird (1975), was his highest charting album (reaching number 26 in the U.S. and number 20 in Canada), and his further Warner releases, the live album On the Road (1976) and Love on the Wing (1977), all charted on the Billboard top 200 albums chart.

In 1978, Young switched labels to Elektra Records, releasing American Dreams (1978), and in 1979 performed as a part of the No Nukes protest concerts organized by Musicians United for Safe Energy. Young's follow up on Elektra, The Perfect Stranger (1982), and a further album on Cypress Records titled The Highway Is for Heroes (1987) did not meet with as much commercial success as his previous works.

In 1993, Young and his wife Connie founded Ridgetop Music, a label based out of their home in Inverness, in order to re-release Young's 1970s catalog on CD, and as an outlet to release new music. On the label, Young released his albums Makin' It Real (1993), Swept Away (1994), and the compilation album Crazy Boy (1995). Young's house in Inverness was destroyed in the Mount Vision fire in October 1995, after which the family relocated to the Kona Coffee Belt of the Big Island of Hawaii, moving into a coffee farm that Young had purchased in 1987.

Young released the album Walk the Talk in 2001 independently, collaborating with his son Cheyenne Young, godson Ethan Turner, and former Youngbloods member Lowell "Banana" Levinger, followed by Songs for Christmas in 2002, released as a part of a CD re-release project with Liquid 8 Records. Young's song "Darkness, Darkness" was covered by Robert Plant in 2002, which received a nomination for the Grammy Award for Best Male Rock Vocal Performance. In 2004, Young released the Hawaii-influenced album Living in Paradise with Artemis Records.

Young reduced touring in 2012 so he and his wife could do more recreational traveling. Two years prior, he had been diagnosed with "chronic Lyme disease", which also made touring difficult. He was inspired to start performing again in 2016, after being impressed by the musicians at his son's graduation recital at the Berklee College of Music, and asked his son to put together a band of his classmates to perform at Young's performance at SXSW. After touring for a year, Young recorded a new solo record with the band, Dreamers, which was released in February 2019 on BMG. In 2020 Young released what would be his final album, the solo acoustic studio-live Highway Troubadour, also on BMG. The 11 tracks feature a pair of songs from Dreamers and reworked arrangements on eight classics including Ridgetop, Euphoria, Quicksand, and Darkness, Darkness. During the COVID-19 pandemic Young created a YouTube video series titled One Song at a Time. On each episode he would play a single track featuring new arrangements and no overdubs. Although his voice showed the wear of time on some tracks on these last releases, Young's guitar work is stellar. He continued to perform live as late as 2023.

== Influences ==
Young was influenced musically by country blues musicians Mississippi John Hurt and Lightnin' Hopkins, blues musician T-Bone Walker, and folk singer Pete Seeger.

== Personal life ==
Young was originally married to Suzi Young, with whom he had two children: Juli (born 1966) and Cheyenne. Young's song "Song for Juli" was co-written with Suzi about Juli, while Young wrote “Morning Sun" from Song for Juli (1973) after the birth of his son Cheyenne. In 1967, Young and his Youngbloods bandmates moved to Marin County, California, and in 1971 he built a house on a ridgetop in Inverness, California. The recording studio at Young's Inverness property, built by Young in 1972, was untouched by the 1995 forest fire, and is currently used as a recording studio by his son Cheyenne's band Beso Negro.

Young met his second wife, Connie Darden, in the 1980s. Together they had two children, Tristan and Jazzie. Tristan graduated from the Berklee College of Music in 2016. He toured with his father as a member of his back-up band, and co-produced Young's album Dreamers (2019). Jazzie (born 1994) is a musician who began releasing music independently in 2017.

In 2006, Young and his family moved to Aiken, South Carolina, which is Connie Darden-Young's hometown. He died at his home there on March 16, 2025, at the age of 83.
