= Inverness Yacht Club =

Californian Yacht Club

Coordinates: 38.1031°N 122.8574°W

- Burgee
- Short name: IYC
- Founded: 1912
- Location: Inverness, California United States
- Website: http://www.invernessyachtclub.org

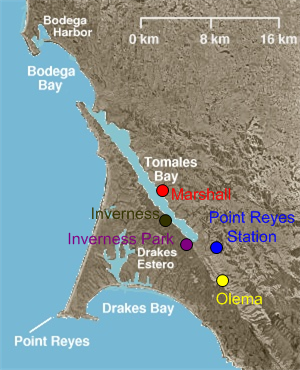

The Inverness Yacht Club or IYC is a small pleasure boating club located in Inverness, California, on the western shore of Tomales Bay, in Marin County, California.

The IYC was first formed in 1912, and the current boathouse was completed in 1914. The club was not financially stable and the club was foreclosed on in 1940. In World War II, it was used as a schoolhouse.

The club was reformed in 1949 and has been in continuous operation since then.

IYC activities include:

- Summer yacht racing season and local and west coast championships
- Summer youth sailing training classes
- Year-round social events for members and guests

Club facilities include:

- A two-story boathouse, with boat storage and maintenance on the ground floor and a large open meeting room upstairs with bar and small kitchen.
- A pier extending out into Tomales Bay.
- A parking lot and boatyard area to the south of the boathouse.

Tomales Bay is notable for its many shoals and its sometimes wildly variable winds, coming down out of the various valleys to the west of the bay on the Point Reyes Peninsula. Many sailors not used to such variable conditions have been surprised by them. It forms an excellent training ground for sailors, who have to learn to read the wind and waves to judge conditions around them.

== Notable members ==
- The late Tom Blackaller (1937–1989), who went on to several world championships in various boat class yacht racing and was the skipper of several America's Cup yacht race contenders, learned to sail in Inverness, mostly out of the IYC.
- The late Adolph S. Oko, Jr. (1904-1977), who was among the first to smuggle arms to Israel and to bring European refugees to the new country.
