= The Youngbloods =

American folk rock band

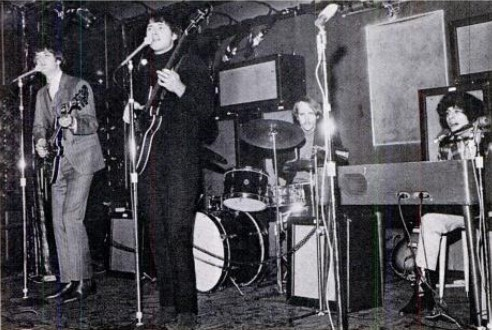
- The band in 1966. Left to right: Jerry Corbitt, Jesse Colin Young, Joe Bauer, and Lowell Levinger

Background information
- Origin: Greenwich Village, New York City, United States
- Genres: Folk rock; psychedelic rock
- Years active: 1965–1972, 1984–1985
- Labels: Raccoon Records, RCA Victor
- Past members: Jesse Colin Young (deceased); Jerry Corbitt (deceased); Lowell Levinger; Joe Bauer (deceased); Michael Kane (deceased); David Perper; Scott Lawrence

The Youngbloods were an American rock band consisting of Jesse Colin Young (vocals, bass, guitar), Jerry Corbitt (vocals, guitar, keyboards, harmonica), Lowell "Banana" Levinger (guitar and electric piano), and Joe Bauer (drums). Despite receiving critical acclaim, they never achieved widespread popularity. Their only U.S. Top 40 entry was Chet Powers's "Get Together".

== Band history ==
=== Background and formation ===
Jesse Colin Young (born Perry Miller, November 22, 1941, Queens, New York) was a moderately successful folk singer with two LPs – Soul of a City Boy (1964) and Youngblood (1965) – when he met fellow folk singer and former bluegrass musician from Cambridge, Massachusetts, Jerry Corbitt (born Jerry Byron Corbitt, January 7, 1943, Tifton, Georgia). When in town, Young would drop in on Corbitt, and the two played together exchanging harmonies.

Beginning in January 1965, the two began performing on the Canadian circuit as a duo, eventually adopting the name "The Youngbloods". The band's name was a reference to Young's second album. Young played bass, and Corbitt sang and played piano, harmonica and lead guitar. Corbitt introduced Young to a bluegrass musician, Lowell Levinger (born Lowell Vincent Levinger, September 9, 1944, Manhattan, New York City). Levinger, known as "Banana", could play the piano, banjo, mandolin, mandola, guitar and bass; he had played in the Proper Bostonians and the Trolls, and played mainly piano and guitar in the Youngbloods. He knew of a fellow tenant who could flesh out the band, Joe Bauer (born September 26, 1941, Memphis, Tennessee), an aspiring jazz drummer with experience playing in society dance bands.

=== Small gigs to recording success ===
Once the line-up was set, Jesse Colin Young and the Youngbloods, as the group was then known, began building a reputation from their club dates. (Early demo sides from 1965 were later issued by Mercury Records on the Two Trips album.) Their first concert had been at Gerde's Folk City in Greenwich Village; months later, they were the house band at the Cafe Au Go Go and had signed a recording contract with RCA Victor. Young, however, was not satisfied with RCA.

The arrangement produced one charting single, "Grizzly Bear" (number 52 in 1967 and number 35 in Canada). Several critically praised albums followed: The Youngbloods (1967, later retitled Get Together); Earth Music (1967); and Elephant Mountain (1969), with the track "Darkness, Darkness".

In 1967, when the track "Get Together", a paean to universal brotherhood, first appeared, it did not sell well, reaching only number 62 on the chart. But two years later – after Dan Ingram had recorded a brotherhood promotion for WABC-AM in which the song was used as a bed for the promotion, and after the National Council of Christians and Jews subsequently used the song in television and radio commercials – the track was re-released and cracked the Top 5. This disc sold over one million copies and received a gold record, awarded by the RIAA, on October 7, 1969.

Johnny Carson once reportedly refused to allow the band to perform on The Tonight Show Starring Johnny Carson, saying they were overly demanding during the pre-show soundcheck. In a 2009 interview, Young stated that the band refused to perform because the show reneged on a promise that they could play a song from their new album Elephant Mountain, instead demanding that they play only "Get Together". Tensions existed within the band as well.

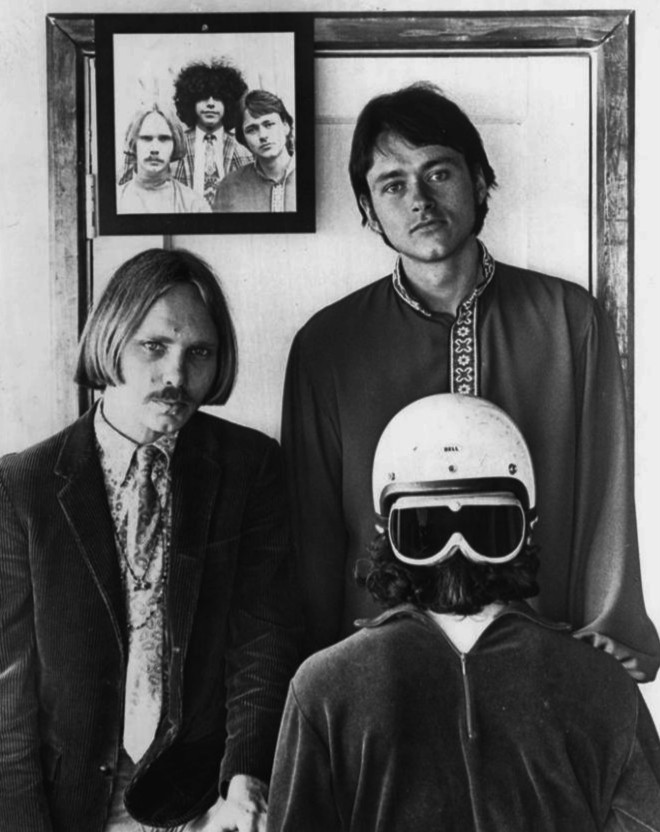
The band as a trio in 1968

With Corbitt's departure from the band (for a solo career) in 1969, before the band recorded the album Elephant Mountain, Levinger assumed lead guitar duties and played extensively on Wurlitzer electric piano. The band became adept at lengthy improvisations in their live performances (as captured on the albums Rock Festival and Ride the Wind, released after the band moved over to their own Raccoon label, distributed by Warner Brothers).

The group added the bassist Michael Kane to their lineup in 1971 and released two more albums: Good & Dusty (1971), which featured "Hippie from Olema" (an answer to Merle Haggard's "Okie from Muskogee"), and High on a Ridgetop (1972), before disbanding.

=== Later history ===
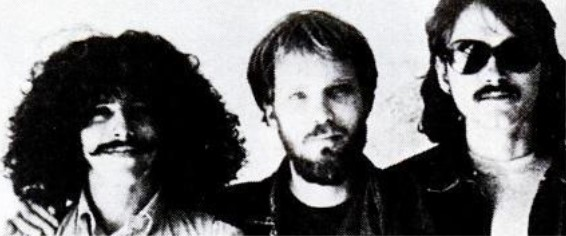
The band in 1970

In 1971 Jerry Corbitt and former Youngbloods producer Charlie Daniels formed a band called Corbitt & Daniels and toured. Young, Levinger and Bauer went on to solo careers; only Young had any notable success. Levinger, Bauer and Kane were part of another group, Noggins, in 1972, which released one album, Crab Tunes. Bauer died of a brain tumor in September 1982, at the age of 40.

Banana supplied guitar, banjo, synthesizer and back-up vocals to Mimi Fariña's 1985 solo album, Solo, and also toured with her on and off from 1973 until the 1990s. During the 1980s and 1990s, he played with the jam rock band Zero on keyboards, vocals and rhythm guitar.

In late 1984, the Youngbloods briefly reunited for a club tour. The 1984 line-up contained Young, Corbitt and Levinger, plus new members David Perper (drums, ex-Pablo Cruise) and Scott Lawrence (keyboards, woodwinds). Once the tour was completed, the group disbanded once again by mid-1985.

Jerry Corbitt died of lung cancer on March 8, 2014. He was 71.

Lowell Levinger released three self-produced bluegrass albums as "Grandpa Banana": I'll Do Anything For You (2009), Just Trying To Break Even (2011) and Even Grandpas Get The Blues (2012). He later joined Little Steven and the Disciples of Soul for their 2017 European and 2018 American tours in support of (Steven) Van Zandt's latest album, Soulfire.

In 2014 Sony Music Japan remastered the first three Youngbloods albums as The Youngbloods – 3 Albums Collection 1967–1969 (Mini LP BSCD2). The Youngbloods and Earth Music, contain both mono and stereo versions of the album, plus bonus tracks. Elephant Mountain contains the full stereo version of the album, plus a few mono versions of selected tracks plus bonus tracks.

Michael Kane died in September 2022.

Jesse Colin Young died on March 16, 2025, at the age of 83, leaving Lowell Levinger as the last surviving member of the group's original lineup.

== Style and legacy ==
The Youngbloods' sound and style are characterized by "temper[ing] their blues and jug band influences with gentle California psychedelia."

Richie Unterberger of AllMusic called the Youngbloods "one of the better groups to emerge from the East Coast in the mid-'60s." He explained, "The Youngbloods could not be considered a major '60s band, but they were capable of offering some mighty pleasurable folk-rock in the late '60s, and produced a few great tunes along the way."

== Former members ==
- Jesse Colin Young – vocals, bass, guitar (1965–1972, 1984–1985; died 2025)
- Jerry Corbitt – guitar, harmonica, vocals (1965–1969, 1984–1985; died 2014)
- Lowell Levinger aka "Banana" – lead guitar, piano, finger cymbals, pedal steel guitar, vocals (1965–1972, 1984–1985)
- Joe Bauer – drums (1965–1972; died 1982)
- Michael Kane – bass (1971–1972; died 2022)
- David Perper – drums (1984–1985)
- Scott Lawrence – keyboards, woodwinds (1984–1985)
- John Richard (Earthquake) Anderson – group manager, harmonica, vocals (1968–1972; died 2017)

== Discography ==
=== Studio albums ===
List of studio albums, with selected chart positions
Title	Release	Peak chart positions	
Title	Release	US	CAN
The Youngbloods	Released: January 1967; Label: RCA Victor; Formats: LP, CD	131	89
Earth Music	Released: May 1967; Label: RCA Victor; Formats: LP, CD	—	—
Elephant Mountain	Released: 1969; Label: RCA Victor; Formats: LP, CD, cassette	118	—
Good and Dusty	Released: 1971; Label: Raccoon Records; Formats: LP, CD, cassette	160	—
High on a Ridge Top	Released: November 1972; Label: Raccoon Records; Formats: LP, CD, 8-track	185	—
"—" denotes that the recording did not chart.

=== Compilation albums ===
Title	Release	Peak chart positions
Title	Release	US
Two Trips	Released: 1970; Label: Mercury; Formats: LP	—
The Best of the Youngbloods	Released: 1970; Label: RCA Victor; Formats: LP, CD, cassette	144
Sunlight	Released: 1971; Label: RCA Victor; Formats: LP	186
"—" denotes that the recording did not chart.

=== Live albums ===
List of live albums, with selected chart positions
Title	Release	Peak chart positions	
Title	Release	US	CAN
Rock Festival	Released: 1970; Label: Raccoon Records; Formats: LP, CD, cassette	89	73
Ride the Wind	Released: 1971; Label: Raccoon Records; Formats: LP, CD, 8-track	157	—
"—" denotes that the recording did not chart.

=== Reissue albums ===
Title	Release
Jesse Colin Young & The Youngbloods	Reissue of Jesse Colin Young's Young Blood (1965); Released: 1969; Label: Mercury; Formats: LP
The Youngbloods	Reissue of The Youngbloods (1967); Released: 1988; Label: Edsel; Formats: LP

=== Singles ===
Year	Title	Peak chart positions		Certification	Record Label	B-side	Album
Year	Title	US	AC	Certification	Record Label	B-side	Album
1966	"Rider"	–	–		Mercury Records	"Sometimes"	Jesse Colin Young & The Youngbloods
1966	"Grizzly Bear"	52	–		RCA Victor	"Tears Are Falling"	The Youngbloods
1967	"Merry-Go-Round"	–	–		RCA Victor	"Foolin' Around (The Waltz)"	
1967	"Euphoria"	–	–		RCA Victor	"The Wine Song"	Earth Music
1967	"Get Together"	62	–		RCA Victor	"All My Dreams Blue"	The Youngbloods
1967	"Fool Me"	–	–		RCA Victor	"I Can Tell"	Earth Music
1968	"Quicksand"	–	–		RCA Victor	"Dreamer's Dream"	Elephant Mountain
1969	"Darkness, Darkness"	124	–		RCA Victor	"On Sir Francis Drake"	Elephant Mountain
1969	"Get Together" (re-release)	5	37	US: Gold	RCA Victor	"Beautiful"	Get Together (The Youngbloods re-release)
1969	"Sunlight"	114	–		RCA Victor	"Trillium"	Elephant Mountain
1970	"Darkness, Darkness" (re-release)	86	–		RCA Victor	"On Sir Francis Drake"	
1970	"Darkness, Darkness" (re-release)	–	–		RCA Victor	"On Sir Francis Drake"	
1970	"Hippie from Olema"	–	–		Raccoon Records	"Misty Roses"	Good and Dusty
1971	"Sunlight" (re-release)	123	–		RCA Victor	"Reason to Believe"	Ride the Wind
1971	"Sugar Babe"	–	–		RCA Victor	"Reason to Believe"	Ride the Wind
1971	"It's a Lovely Day"	–	–		Raccoon Records	"Ice Bag"	Rock Festival
1972	"Light Shine"	–	–		Raccoon Records	"Will the Circle Be Unbroken"	Good and Dusty
1972	"Dreamboat"	–	–		Raccoon Records	"Kind Hearted Woman"	High on a Ridge Top
1972	"Running Bear"	–	–		Raccoon Records	"Kind Hearted Woman"	High on a Ridge Top
2009	"All My Dreams Blue"	–	–		Sundazed Music	"Sham"	
