= Swept Away (Jesse Colin Young album) =

Studio album by Jesse Colin Young
- Released: 1994
- Label: Ridgetop Music
- Producer: Jesse Colin Young

Jesse Colin Young chronology
Makin' It Real (1993)	Swept Away (1994)	Sweetwater (1996)

Swept Away is an album by the American musician Jesse Colin Young, released in 1994. A mostly acoustic album, it followed the more rock-oriented Makin' It Real. Its cover photo depicts a naked Young and his guitar.

== Production ==
The album was produced by Young. His daughter Juli sang on the album. "Misty Roses" is a cover of the Tim Hardin song. The guitar used on "Love Is You" employs a Hawaiian tuning.

== Critical reception ==
Professional ratings
Review scores
Source	Rating
AllMusic	4.5/5 stars
The Encyclopedia of Popular Music	3/5 stars
The Indianapolis Star	2.5/4 stars
MusicHound Rock: The Essential Album Guide	0/5 stars
The Tampa Tribune	2/4 stars

The Washington Post called the album "an unabashed and nearly uninterrupted series of love songs and confessional ballads," writing that, "for the most part, Young plays to his strengths as a folk balladeer." The Indianapolis Star determined that "Young sure has a melancholy way of singing about his happiness... Young describes the close connections between sorrow and joy, and the tenuous balance we strive to maintain for fear of losing the joy part." The Tampa Tribune thought that "digital production and Young's soothing vocals enhance this new age folk-rock outing."

The Rocky Mountain News noted the "typically soaring vocals and numerous ballads," writing that "it also would have benefited mightily from more variety." The Fort Worth Star-Telegram lamented that "even the cover of Tim Hardin's ethereal 'Misty Roses' can't save this wallow in emotional extremism."

AllMusic wrote that "the album worked because of its sincerity: thirty years into his recording career, Jesse Colin Young retained a remarkable, childlike openness that invited listeners into his world."

== Track listing ==
No.	Title	Length
1.	"Swept Away"
2.	"Misty Roses"
3.	"Love Is the Moment"
4.	"Cheyenne"
5.	"Desire"
6.	"Waterfall"
7.	"Our Wedding Song"
8.	"Sweet as a Song"
9.	"Catfish"
10.	"Laimana"
11.	"Street of Broken Dreams"
12.	"Spring Is Here"
13.	"Love Is You"
