= Mount Vision Fire =

1995 wildfire in Northern California

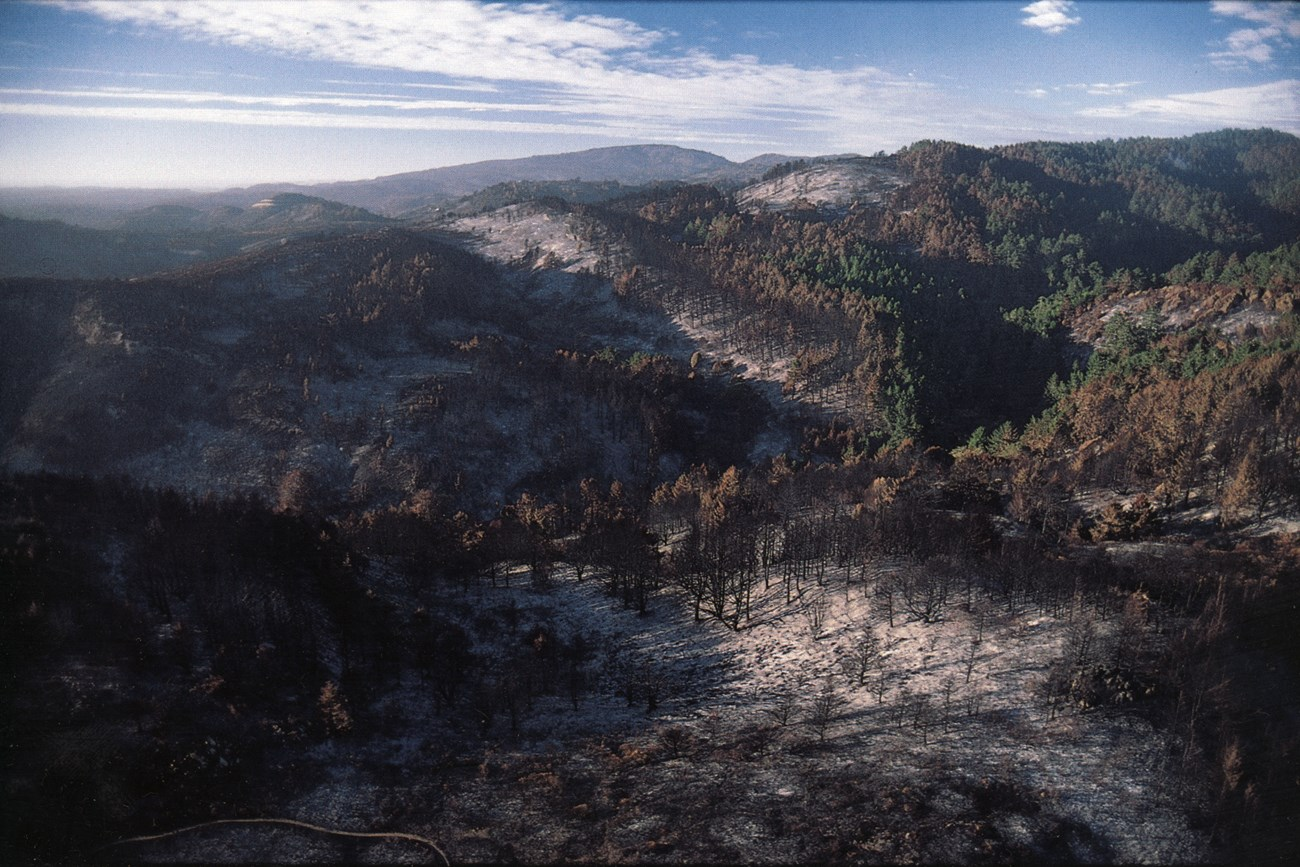
- The burn area after the fire, with Mount Vision in the distant background
- Date: October 3, 1995 –; October 16, 1995; (14 days)
- Location: Point Reyes, Inverness, California
- Coordinates: 38.083°N 122.883°W

Statistics
- Burned area: 12,354 acres (4,999 ha; 19 sq mi; 50 km^{2})

Impacts
- Evacuated: 422
- Structures lost: 45
- Cost: $29.2 million; (equivalent to about $54.7 million in 2024)

Ignition
- Cause: Illegal campfire

Map
- Location of fire in California

The Mount Vision Fire was a wildfire that burned 12,354 acres (4,999 ha) of land on the Point Reyes National Seashore peninsula in northern California during October 1995. The fire, which was started by an incompletely extinguished campfire, destroyed 45 homes in Inverness Park.

== Progression ==
The fire began on the southeastern flank of Mount Vision, a peak above Tomales Bay, on October 3. It was first reported by a fire lookout at Mount Barnabe at 1:27 p.m. PDT. It expanded quickly, driven by 45-mile-per-hour (72 km/h) winds. The fire peaked in activity in the before-dawn hours of October 4, burning approximately 3,500 acres (1,400 ha) per hour as it burned from Inverness Ridge downhill to the Pacific Ocean. It had burned 700 acres (280 ha) by 2:00 a.m. and reached 8,880 acres (3,590 ha) by 6:00 p.m. All 45 homes lost in the fire burned in just the first 24 hours after it ignited.

At its peak, the fire suppression effort involved 2,164 personnel and fourteen aircraft. Weather changed for the better on October 5. Containment of the fire jumped from 60 percent to 80% on October 6. The fire was declared completely contained on October 7 and then completely controlled on October 16.

== Effects ==
The fire suppression effort cost $6.2 million, roughly equivalent to $11.6 million in 2024. Fourteen percent of the Point Reyes National Seashore burned in the fire. The fire killed 98 percent of the mountain beaver population in the burn area.

The Mount Vision Fire forced 422 people to evacuate. It destroyed 45 homes—most were located in a single neighborhood called Paradise Ranch Estates above Inverness Park. Twelve more homes were damaged. Total damages were estimated at $23 million. No fatalities or major injuries occurred during the fire.

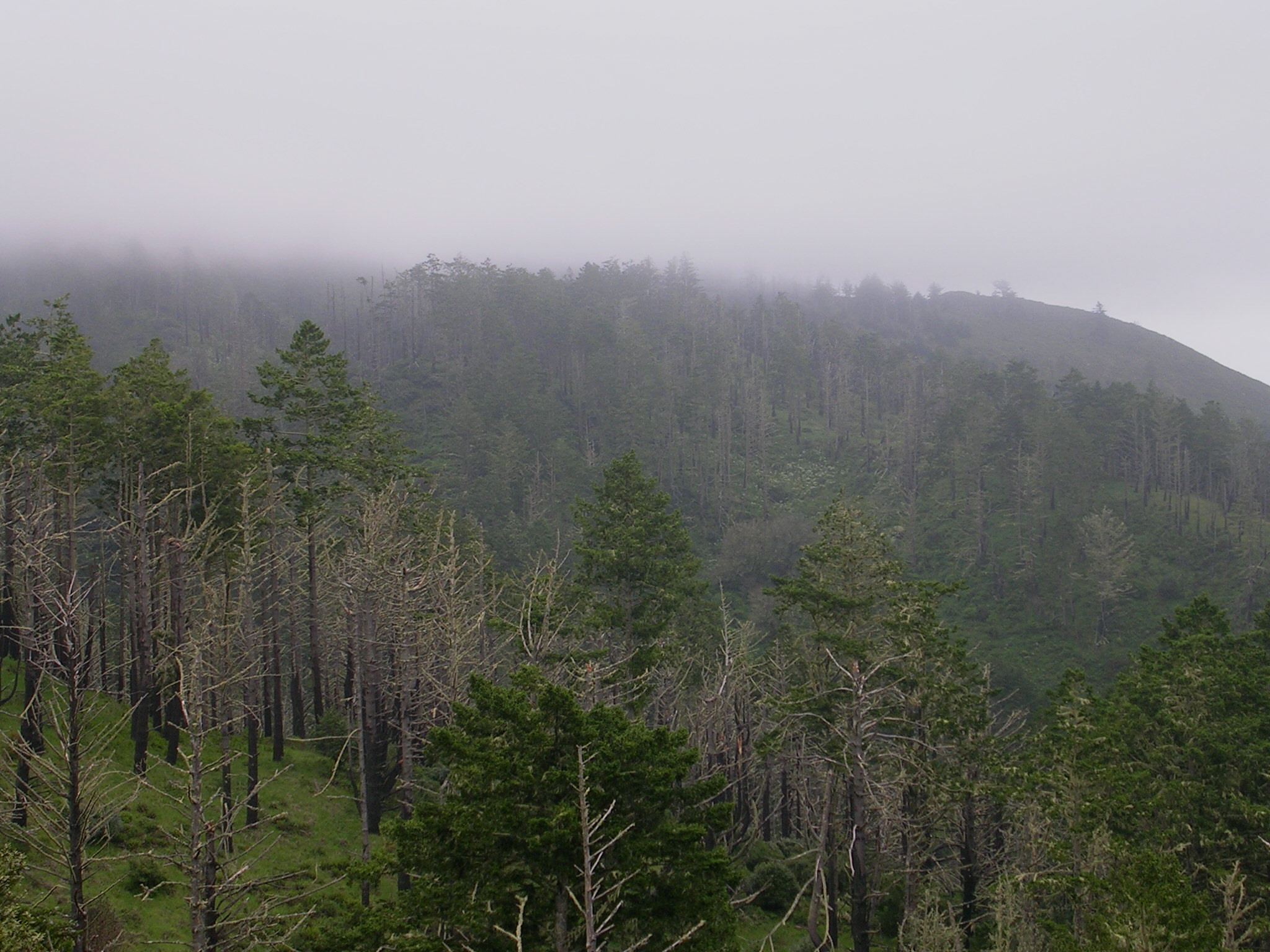
Recovering forest seen in 2006
