= Let's Get Together (Chet Powers song) =

1967 single by the Youngbloods

"Let's Get Together", also known as "Get Together" and "Everybody Get Together", is a song written in the mid-1960s by the American singer-songwriter Chet Powers (stage name Dino Valenti), from the psychedelic rock band Quicksilver Messenger Service. A hit version by the Youngbloods, included on their 1967 debut album The Youngbloods, peaked at No. 5 on the Billboard Hot 100 in 1969.

== Background ==
The song is an appeal for peace and brotherhood, presenting the polarity of love versus fear, and the choice to be made between them. It is best remembered for the impassioned plea in the lines of its refrain ("Come on people now/Smile on your brother/Everybody get together/Try to love one another right now"), which is repeated several times in succession to bring the song to its conclusion.

== Original recording history ==
The song was originally written and recorded as "Let's Get Together" by Chet Powers under the stage name Dino Valenti as early as 1963, but this version was not officially released until 1996 on the compilation album Someone to Love: The Birth of the San Francisco Sound on UK label Big Beat Records; Powers had died two years prior in 1994.

The very first release of the song was an instrumental by the Folkswingers on their 1963 album 12 String Guitar! Vol. 2.

A live vocal performance by the Kingston Trio in March 1964 was released on June 1, 1964 on their album Back in Town. While it was not released as a single, this version was the first to bring the song to the attention of the general public. The Kingston Trio often performed it live.

David Crosby recorded a version of the song around 1964, prior to the formation of the Byrds. This version was not released until the Byrds' 2001 compilation The Preflyte Sessions.

Jefferson Airplane included the song in their 1966 debut album Jefferson Airplane Takes Off.

== The Youngbloods version ==
"Get Together"
- West German picture sleeve

Single by the Youngbloods

from the album The Youngbloods
- B-side: "All My Dreams Blue"
- Released: July 1967
- Recorded: 1966
- Genre: Folk rock; psychedelic rock
- Length: 4:37
- Label: RCA Victor
- Songwriter: Chet Powers
- Producer: Felix Pappalardi

The Youngbloods singles chronology
"Darkness, Darkness" (1969)	"Get Together" (1967)	"Sunlight" (1969)

Audio
- "Get Together" on YouTube

The most notable recording of "Let's Get Together" came in 1967, when the Youngbloods released their version under the title "Get Together", from their debut album The Youngbloods. Initially released as a single in July 1967, it became a minor Hot 100 hit for them, peaking at No. 62. However, renewed interest in the Youngbloods' version came when it was used in a radio public service announcement as a call for brotherhood by the National Conference of Christians and Jews. It was subsequently re-released in 1969, and peaked at No. 5 on the Billboard Hot 100 and reaching No. 37 on the US Adult Contemporary chart. It was their only top 40 hit on the Hot 100.

== The Dave Clark Five version ==
In March 1970, British rock band the Dave Clark Five reached No. 8 on the UK Singles Chart with their version, titled "Everybody Get Together", which is from their fifth UK studio album, If Somebody Loves You.

== Other versions ==
- We Five, produced by Kingston Trio manager Frank Werber, released the first version of the song to break into the top forty, in 1965 as the follow-up to their top ten hit "You Were on My Mind". "Let's Get Together" peaked at No. 31 on the Billboard Hot 100 in the U.S. and reached No. 5 in Canada. It would be the group's last hit record. It was included on their second album, Make Someone Happy.
- Canadian group 3's a Crowd released their version as a single in 1968, titled "Let's Get Together". It peaked at No. 70 on Canada's national singles chart.
- In 1970, Gwen and Jerry Collins released the song as a single that reached No. 34 on the US Country chart.
- In 1995, Big Mountain released their version as a single that reached No. 28 on the US Adult Contemporary chart and No. 44 on the Billboard Hot 100. It also reached No. 32 on Cash Box.

== Chart history ==
=== Weekly charts ===
The Youngbloods

Chart (1967)	Peak position
US Billboard Hot 100	62
US Cash Box Top 100	80
Canada RPM Top Singles	40

Chart (1969)	Peak position
Australia (Go-Set)	13
Canada RPM Top Singles	6
South Africa (Springbok)	10
US Billboard Hot 100	5
US Billboard Easy Listening	37
US Cash Box Top 100	4

The Dave Clark Five

Chart (1970)	Peak position
UK Singles (OCC)	8

=== Year-end charts ===
Chart (1969)	Rank
Canada	50
US Billboard Hot 100	16
US Cash Box	42

== Legacy ==
- Following the September 11 terrorist attacks, the media conglomerate company Clear Channel Communications included the Youngbloods' version of the song on a list of "lyrically questionable" songs that was sent to its 1,200 radio stations in the United States.

== See also ==
- List of 1960s one-hit wonders in the United States
