= Charlie Daniels =

American musician and songwriter (1936–2020)

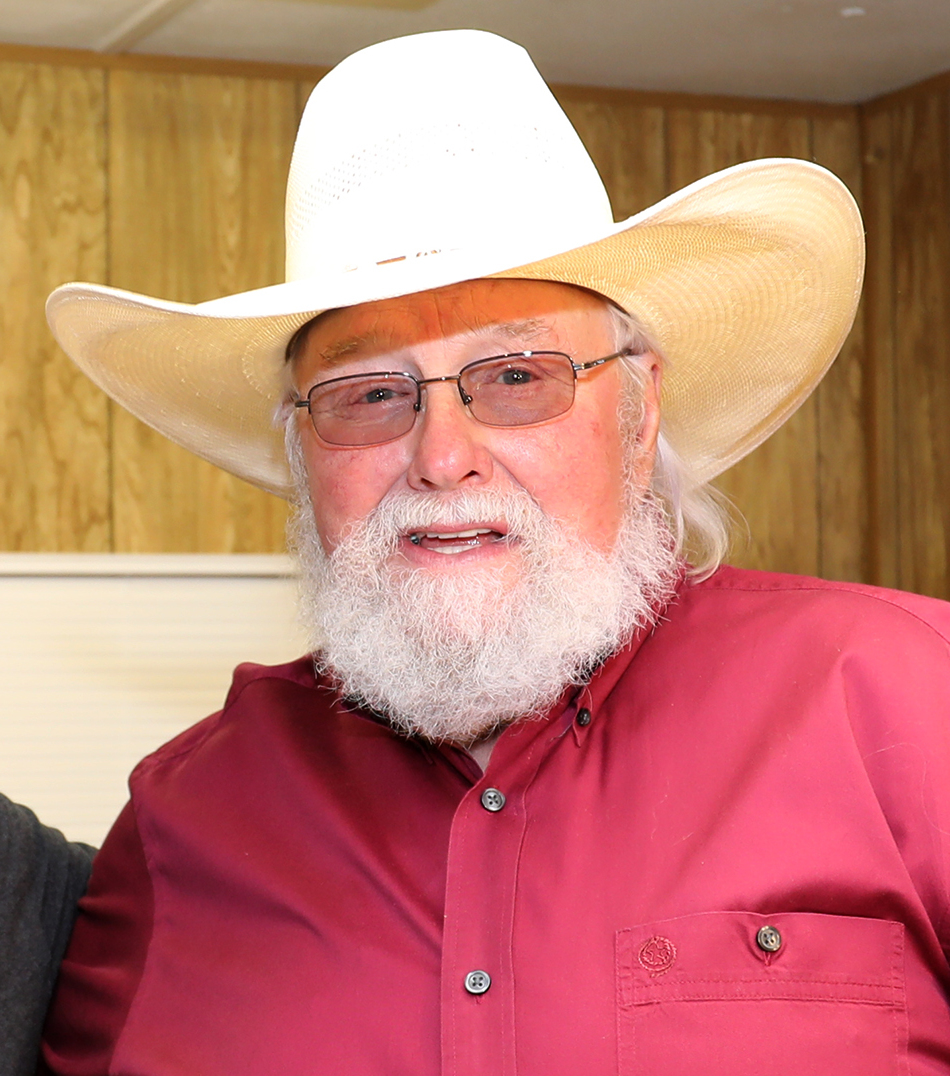
- Daniels in 2017

Background information
- Born: Charles Edward Daniels; October 28, 1936; Wilmington, North Carolina, U.S.
- Died: July 6, 2020 (aged 83) Hermitage, Tennessee, U.S.
- Genres: Southern rock; country rock; progressive country; bluegrass
- Occupations: Musician; singer-songwriter
- Instruments: Vocals; fiddle; guitar
- Years active: 1953–2020
- Labels: Kama Sutra; Epic; Liberty; Sparrow; Capitol; Reprise; Blue Hat
- Formerly of: Misty Mountain Boys; The Jaguars; Charlie Daniels Band; Beau Weevils
- Website: charliedaniels.com

Charles Edward Daniels (October 28, 1936 – July 6, 2020) was an American singer, songwriter, and musician. His music fused rock, country, blues and jazz and was a pioneering contribution to Southern rock and progressive country. He was best known for his number-one country hit "The Devil Went Down to Georgia". Much of his output, including all but one of his eight Billboard Hot 100 charting singles, was credited to the Charlie Daniels Band.

Daniels was active as a singer and musician from the 1950s until his death in 2020. He was inducted into the Cheyenne Frontier Days Hall of Fame in 2002, the Grand Ole Opry in 2008, the Musicians Hall of Fame and Museum in 2009 and the Country Music Hall of Fame in 2016.

== Early life ==
Charles Edward Daniels was born October 28, 1936, in Wilmington, North Carolina, to teenage parents William and LaRue Daniel. The "s" in Daniels' name was added by mistake when his birth certificate was filled out. Two weeks after Daniels had begun to attend elementary school, his family moved to Valdosta, Georgia, commuting between Valdosta and Elizabethtown, North Carolina, before moving back to Wilmington. After enduring measles, Daniels would require glasses to see for most of his life afterward, which led to his being bullied by other children at his school. Despite these challenges, Daniels found inspiration in Pentecostal gospel music, local bluegrass groups, and rhythm and blues artists he heard on the radio. Additionally, Western films sparked his imagination and creativity. These early influences motivated him to start writing and performing songs, laying the foundation for his future musical career.

== Career ==
=== Sideman career and first rock band ===
Daniels began his music career as a member of the bluegrass band Misty Mountain Boys in 1953, already skilled on guitar, fiddle, banjo, and mandolin, In the 1960s, Daniels was performing rock and roll. Daniels formed a band, the Rockets, who later changed its name to the Jaguars after scoring a hit single with the instrumental recording "Jaguar". After discovering jazz, the Jaguars began performing jazz music, before reverting to rock and country music by 1964.

Daniels lent his talents to the bass guitar playing, arrangement and co-production of a single, "Love" (b/w "Black Olives"), by The Bad Boys, which was released on the Paula Records label in 1966. It became an R&B hit, first registering on the Cash Box Top 50 in R&B Locations chart on 17 December 1966, and still active on the Cash Box Looking Ahead chart 18 March 1967. where it peaked at no. 11. It also made the Record World national R&B chart, peaking at no. 28 on 28 January.

During his career as a rock and roll sideman, Daniels also wrote songs for other performers. In July 1963, soul singer Jerry Jackson recorded Daniels's song "It Hurts Me"; the following year, on 12 January 1964, Elvis Presley recorded the better-known version of Daniels's song. The songwriting credits list Charles E. Daniels and Joy Byers as the songwriters, although Byers' husband, songwriter and producer Bob Johnston, was the actual co-writer with Daniels. Johnston encouraged Daniels to move to Nashville to get work as a session player, which led to Daniels's recording with Bob Dylan on his 1969 album Nashville Skyline, Ringo Starr on his 1970 album Beaucoups of Blues and Leonard Cohen on his 1971 album Songs of Love and Hate, as well as further sessions with Dylan and Cohen's 1971 tour. Dylan and Daniels found each other creatively invigorating during their recordings together, with Dylan saying that "when Charlie was around, something good would usually come out of the sessions", and Daniels describing the recording sessions with Dylan as "loose, free and, most of all, fun". Daniels also produced albums for the Youngbloods, including their 1969 album Elephant Mountain.

=== Solo career and formation of the Charlie Daniels Band ===
Daniels released his self-titled debut album in 1970, which helped lay the foundations for Southern rock. Two years later, Daniels formed the Charlie Daniels Band. Daniels scored a Top 10 hit on the Billboard Pop charts with "Uneasy Rider", a talking bluegrass song, in 1973. The following year, Daniels organized the first Volunteer Jam concert. The same year, the Charlie Daniels Band released the gold selling Fire on the Mountain, followed by the even more successful Nightrider, whose success was spurred by the Top 40 hit single "Texas". Saddle Tramp was also a gold seller, and was the first release by the band to reach the top 10 of the Billboard Country charts.

In 1975, he played fiddle on Hank Williams Jr's breakthrough studio album Hank Williams Jr. and Friends on the songs "Losin You", originally by The Marshall Tucker Band, and "Stoned At The Jukebox". He would also later provide a fiddle solo to the bridge of Williams Jr's song "Family Tradition" from his 1979 studio album of the same name.

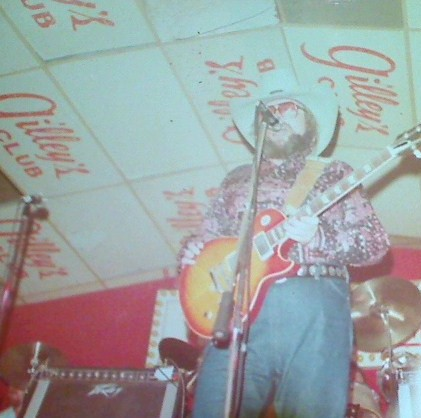
Daniels performing in 1979, the year he won a Grammy Award for Best Country Vocal Performance for "The Devil Went Down to Georgia".

In 1979, the Charlie Daniels Band released their most commercially successful album, Million Mile Reflections, which reached number five and was certified triple-platinum. It featured the single "The Devil Went Down to Georgia", which reached No. 3 on the Billboard Hot 100 in September 1979, and won Daniels the Grammy Award for Best Country Vocal Performance. The band also attracted a high-profile fan in President Jimmy Carter, who used Daniels's song "The South's Gonna Do It Again" as his campaign theme, After Carter's win, the band performed at his 1977 inauguration. In 1980, Daniels played himself in the film Urban Cowboy, starring John Travolta, and as a result became closely identified with the revival of country music generated by the film's success. Subsequently, the combination of the success of the more country-oriented song and the decline in popularity of Southern rock led Daniels to shift focus in his sound from rock to country music. After the platinum-certified Full Moon (1980) and the gold-certified Windows (1982), Daniels would not have another hit album until the 1989 release Simple Man, which earned Daniels another gold album, although the title track sparked controversy, as it was interpreted by some as advocating vigilantism, because of lyrics such as "Just take them rascals [rapists, killers, child abusers] out in the swamp/Put 'em on their knees and tie 'em to a stump/Let the rattlers and the bugs and the alligators do the rest", which garnered Daniels considerable media attention and talk show visits.

=== Later career ===
In the 1990s, Daniels's albums failed to chart, although he continued to draw audiences as a concert performer well into the 21st century. In 1995, Daniels released the first of three Christian albums for Sparrow Records, The Door. In 1999, Daniels was inducted into the North Carolina Music Hall of Fame.

The 21st century saw Daniels, who had previously recorded for major labels, predominantly recording for independent record labels. In 2001, Daniels received considerable attention for his song "This Ain't No Rag, It's a Flag", released in November, 2001, which was written in response to the September 11 attacks. Daniels then followed with a book entitled Ain't No Rag. Songs from the Longleaf Pines (2005) marked Daniels's first fully bluegrass and gospel album, and began an association with Koch Records, which began releasing a series of Daniels's albums which included holiday albums, live albums and theme compilations.

On October 18, 2005, Daniels was honored as a BMI Icon at the 53rd annual BMI Country Awards. The following year, Daniels played in the backup band for Hank Williams Jr.'s opening sequence to Monday Night Football. In November 2007, Daniels was invited to become a member of the Grand Ole Opry. He was inducted during the January 19, 2008, edition of the Opry. In 2009, Daniels was featured playing fiddle in a commercial for GEICO.

In 2016, Daniels released Night Hawks, an album of Western swing music. In October of that year, Daniels became a member of the Country Music Hall of Fame. In March 2017, HarperCollins announced that Daniels's memoir, Never Look at the Empty Seats, would be released on October 24, 2017. In the late 2010s, Daniels, drummer James Stroud, guitarist Billy Crain and bassist Charlie Hayward formed a new band, Beau Weevils, which debuted on the 2018 album Songs in the Key of E, which Daniels described as being in a "down-home, swampy rock meets funk with a little taste of Delta-type of style." On September 28, 2018, Daniels was awarded the MMP Music Award and inducted into the MMP Global Entertainment Hall of Fame in Biloxi, MS. On November 6, 2018, Daniels released a book of daily inspirational quotes and stories titled Let's All Make the Day Count: The Everyday Wisdom of Charlie Daniels through HarperCollins's Thomas Nelson imprint.

== Musical style ==
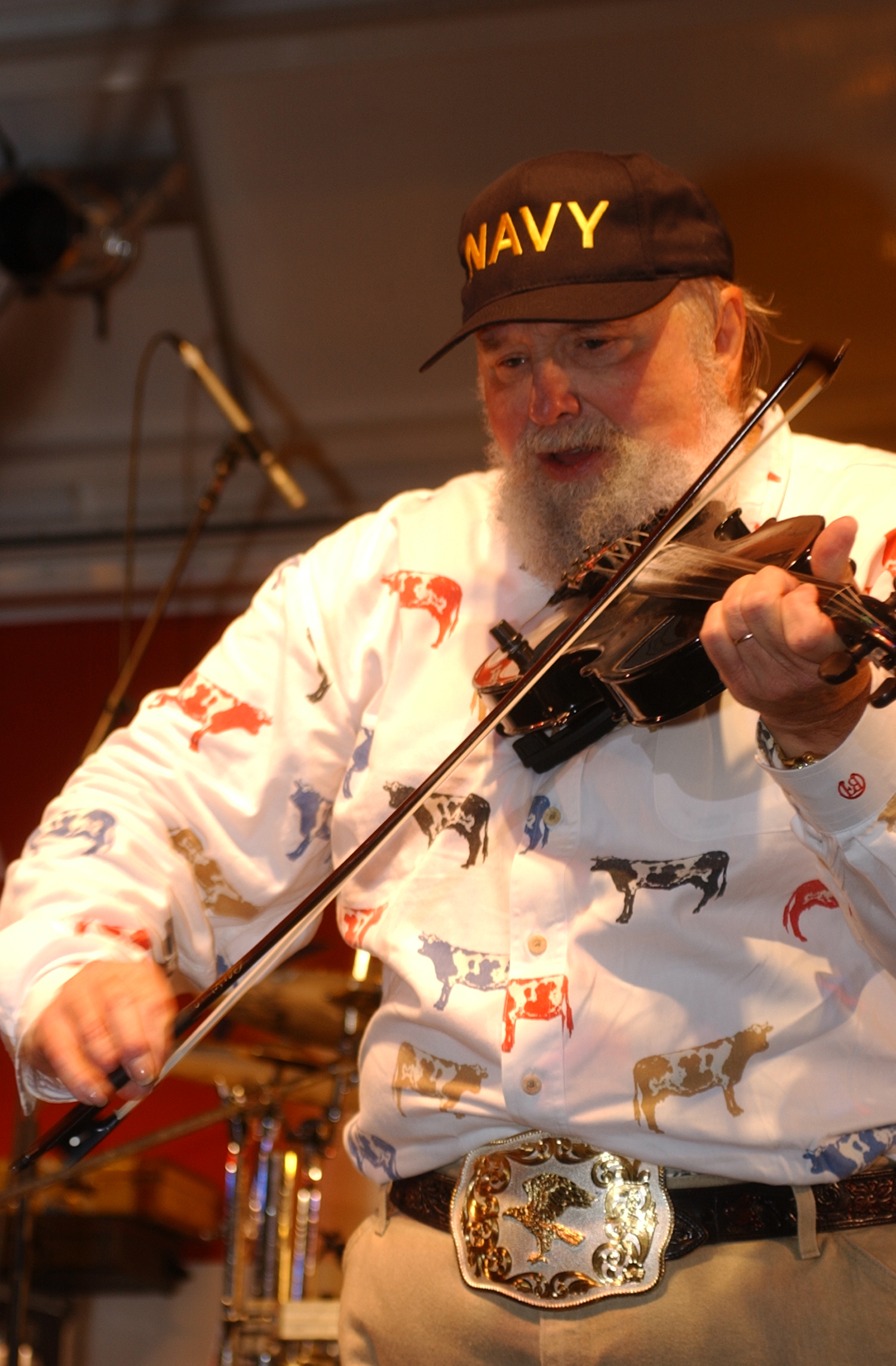
Daniels performing at the U.S. Naval Station Great Lakes, September 11, 2003.

Stephen Thomas Erlewine said that Charlie Daniels's self-titled debut album, released in 1970, was a pivotal recording in the development of the Southern rock genre, "because it points the way to how the genre could and would sound, and how country music could retain its hillbilly spirit and rock like a mother." Erlewine described Daniels as "a redneck rebel, not fitting into either the country or the rock & roll [...] but, in retrospect, he sounds like a visionary, pointing the way to the future when southern rockers saw no dividing lines between rock, country, and blues, and only saw it all as sons of the South." The Charlie Daniels Band fused rock, country, blues, and jazz; Erlewine described the band's sound as "a distinctly Southern blend" which emphasized improvisation in their instrumentation, which was aided by the band following the Allman Brothers Band's seminal use of two lead guitarists and two drummers. The New York Times said that Daniels's music incorporated elements of country, blues, bluegrass, rock, and Western swing.

After the success of "The Devil Went Down to Georgia", a single which Erlewine described as a "a roaring country-disco fusion", Daniels shifted his sound from rock toward country music. In both Daniels's rock and country recordings, Daniels "helped shape the sound of country-rock". In 1977, Billboard identified the Charlie Daniels Band as major performers of progressive country. In 2010, the rapper Cowboy Troy said that Charlie Daniels and Jerry Reed's vocal delivery "was called recitations at that time, but if you listened to it now, you'd probably call it a rap". Rolling Stone described "The Devil Went Down to Georgia" as one of the earliest examples of country rap. Regarding his musical style, Daniels said "I never claimed to be country"; Daniels described his style instead as "American music", saying that the Charlie Daniels Band played "some of all the music that's come across in America", particularly country, bluegrass, rock, gospel and jazz. Daniels also said "I refuse to be categorized because I think that puts blinders on you." Daniels's guitar playing was defined as having a "thick, buttery sound" which he achieved by stringing his Les Paul guitars with .10 gauge Gibson strings and amplifying them through a Marshall cabinet.

== Views ==
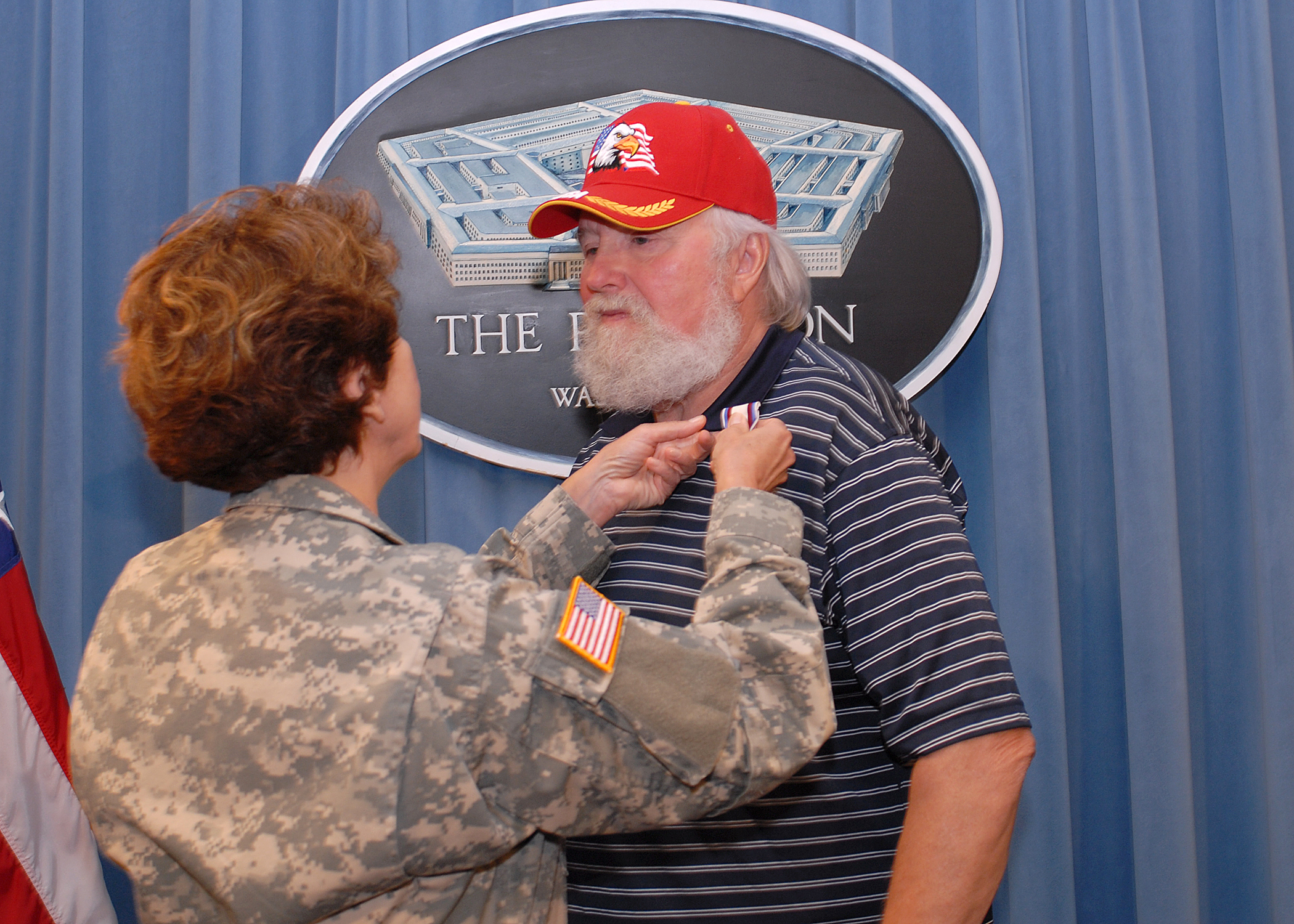
Daniels being presented with the Office of the Secretary of Defense Medal for Exceptional Public Service during a visit to the Pentagon in 2007

Daniels did not endorse any political candidates, and refused to express political views in his concerts. Regarding his views, Daniels said, "I do not consider myself political. I can understand why people would say what I write is political. It's not. It's just my feelings. It's common sense to me as an American citizen, which is not only our right, but our duty, really, to express our opinion, if no other way than at least in the voting booth. I don't do that on stage. I don't pay good money to go hear somebody talk about their political beliefs. It's just not part of my show. That is confined to the private part of my life, which I consider my writings on Twitter and [interviews]". However, in 1976, Daniels performed at campaign fundraisers for Jimmy Carter's presidential bid, and at his inauguration in January the following year; Daniels also initially supported the legalization of marijuana. In the following decade, however, Daniels expressed views that many considered to be right-wing and conservative. According to Forbes writer Seth Cohen, Daniels "frequently captured the pent-up frustrations of many Americans who felt that a 'coastal elite' cadre of politicians and activists were moving the country farther away from some of its core values". According to Rolling Stone, Daniels had "plenty in common with moderates and liberals who supported Bernie Sanders, expressing disgust at Washington gridlock and a fervent belief in term limits for people in Congress so that fresh ideas keep coming." Daniels also supported "the idea that someone can criticize the president's decision making and not be called anti-American."

Daniels was an outspoken Christian. In 2003, Daniels supported the invasion of Iraq. Regarding the removal of Confederate monuments and memorials, Daniels said, "If tearing them down did any good, I'd be all for it. But I don't see where it does any good." Daniels also said that "when we pay attention to political correctness and things that don't really mean anything, we're wasting time, energy and political capital by not getting something meaningful done. We spend time chasing rainbows." In 2013, following chemical weapons attacks by Bashar al-Assad, and United States military response, Daniels wrote, "These and other questions need to be answered before any kind of action, bilateral or unilateral is taken. Otherwise, we will be right back in the same old Middle Eastern boiling pot again and I think everybody, doves and hawks alike, have had enough of that." In 2016, he appeared in an ad for the NRA that was directed at the government of Iran. After President Donald Trump's April 7, 2017, military strike against targets in Syria in retaliation for additional chemical weapon deployment, Daniels tweeted: "The world changed yesterday, America will no longer be viewed as a cowering toothless tiger." In 2019, Daniels lambasted New York Governor Andrew Cuomo for signing the Reproductive Health Act, which legalized abortion until birth under some circumstances, tweeting "Watch the wrinkles on Cuomo's face lengthen as the ramifications of the thousands of murders he has sanctioned come to bear on him. The NY legislature has created a new Auschwitz dedicated to the execution of a whole segment of defenseless citizens. Satan is smiling."

== Personal life and death ==
Daniels married Hazel Juanita Alexander on September 20, 1964. They had one child, a son, Charles Edward Daniels Jr. An avid University of Tennessee sports fan, Daniels enjoyed hunting, fishing, snowmobiling, and other outdoor activities. He was a member of the National Rifle Association of America (NRA) and performed in their videos.

Daniels suffered a major arm injury on January 29, 1980, while digging fence post holes on his farm near Mount Juliet. He suffered three complete breaks in his right arm and two broken fingers when his shirtsleeve caught on a spinning power auger. The injury required surgery, and he was sidelined for four months.

Daniels was successfully treated for prostate cancer in 2001. On January 15, 2010, Daniels was rushed to the hospital after suffering a stroke while snowmobiling in Colorado. He was released two days later. During a doctor visit on March 25, 2013, Daniels was diagnosed with a mild case of pneumonia and admitted to a Nashville hospital for a series of routine tests. The tests revealed that a pacemaker was needed to regulate his heart rate. One was put in on March 28, and Daniels was released within days.

Daniels died on July 6, 2020, at the age of 83 of a hemorrhagic stroke at Summit Medical Center in Hermitage, Tennessee. He is buried in Mount Juliet, Tennessee.

== Filmography ==
- Heartworn Highways (1976) ... Himself
- The Midnight Special (1979)... Himself (Musical Guest)
- Murder in Music City aka The County Western Murders (1979) ... Himself
- Urban Cowboy (1980) ... Himself
- Saturday Night Live (1982) ... Himself (Musical Guest)
- The Fall Guy (1983) ... Himself
- The Lone Star Kid (1985) ... Vernon Matthews
- Murder, She Wrote (1987) ... Stoney Carmichael
- Charlie Daniels' Talent Roundup (1994) ... Himself (Host)
- King of the Hill (2000) ... Himself (2 Episodes)
- 18 Wheels of Justice (2000) ... Frank Schooler
- The Legend Lives On: A Tribute to Bill Monroe (2003) ... Himself
- Fox NFL Sunday (2005) - Super Bowl XXXIX Pregame Show ... Himself
- Veggietales (2005) ... Himself (Musical Guest) ("Minnesota Cuke and the Search for Samson's Hairbrush")
- Dinner: Impossible (2008) ... Himself
- Poliwood (2009) ... Himself
- A Twin Pines Christmas (2009) ... Himself
- Sweet Home Alabama: The Southern Rock Saga (2012) ... Himself
- Behold a Pale Horse: America's Last Chance (2012) ... Himself
- Iron Will: Veterans Battle With PTSD (2016) ... Himself
- Floating Horses: The Life of Casey Tibbs (2017) ... Himself
- Country Music (2019) ... Himself

== Discography ==
Awards
Preceded by Judy Collins	First Amendment Center/AMA "Spirit of Americana" Free Speech Award; 2006	Succeeded by Mavis Staples
