= Live on Long Island =

Live on Long Island 04-18-80

Live album by Marshall Tucker Band
- Released: August 22, 2006
- Recorded: April 18, 1980
- Venue: Nassau Coliseum
- Genre: Southern rock, country rock
- Length: 1:48:20
- Label: Shout! Factory
- Producer: Doug Gray

Marshall Tucker Band chronology
Carolina Christmas (2006)	Live on Long Island 04-18-80 (2006)	The Next Adventure (2006)

Live on Long Island 04-18-80 is a 2-CD set recorded by The Marshall Tucker Band at Nassau Coliseum and is the final recording of bassist and founding member Tommy Caldwell, occurring just ten days before his death in an automobile accident. Tommy Caldwell is pictured on the album cover. This is the first CD to feature a complete concert recording from the original band. However, the album wasn't released until 26 years later. The band was touring in support of their album Tenth at the time of this recording and features the songs "It Takes Time" and "Cattle Drive" from that release as well as classics such as "Heard It in a Love Song", "Searchin' for a Rainbow" and "Can't You See".

Professional ratings
Review scores
Source	Rating
Allmusic	[Live on Long Island at AllMusic]

== Track listing ==
All songs by Toy Caldwell, except where noted.

=== Disc one ===
1. "Running Like the Wind" - 10:53
2. "Last of the Singing Cowboys" (George McCorkle) - 4:43
3. "It Takes Time" - 4:06
4. "Cattle Drive" (Toy and Tommy Caldwell) - 6:52
5. "See You One More Time" - 4:44
6. "Sing My Blues" (Toy and Tommy Caldwell) - 3:47
7. "Take the Highway" - 6:39
8. "Heard It in a Love Song" - 5:28
9. "Ramblin'" - 6:38

=== Disc two ===
1. "Fire on the Mountain" (McCorkle) - 4:50
2. "In My Own Way" - 7:00
3. "Desert Skies" - 6:58
4. "24 Hours at a Time" - 15:16
5. "Can't You See" - 6:49
6. "Searchin' for a Rainbow" - 7:18
7. "This Ol' Cowboy" - 6:21

== Personnel ==
- Toy Caldwell - guitar, steel guitar, vocals
- Tommy Caldwell - bass guitar, vocals
- Doug Gray - lead vocals
- George McCorkle - guitar
- Paul Riddle - drums
- Jerry Eubanks - flute, saxophone, vocals

== Production ==
- Producer: Doug Gray
- Recording engineer: Buddy Strong at Southeastern Sound Studios
- Art direction: Sandy Tanaka
- Mastered by Keith Blake at Pacific Mastering
