= A New Life (album) =

Studio album by the Marshall Tucker Band
- Released: February 1974
- Recorded: 1973
- Studio: Capricorn Sound
- Genres: Country; Southern rock
- Length: 42:39
- Label: Capricorn
- Producer: Paul Hornsby

The Marshall Tucker Band chronology
The Marshall Tucker Band (1973)	A New Life (1974)	Where We All Belong (1974)

A New Life is the second album by the Marshall Tucker Band. It was recorded in Macon, Georgia, at Capricorn Studios. Guest musicians include Charlie Daniels and Jai Johanny Johanson from the Allman Brothers Band.

== Music ==
The sound of A New Life is considered to draw more heavily on the band's country influences than their debut, while also incorporating elements of blues and jazz. Also of note, the band uses a mellotron on "You Ain't Foolin' Me".

Professional ratings
Review scores
Source	Rating
AllMusic	4/5 stars
Christgau's Record Guide	B

== Track listing ==
All songs written by Toy Caldwell.

Side one

1. "A New Life" - 6:44
2. "Southern Woman" - 7:55
3. "Blue Ridge Mountain Sky" - 3:37
4. "Too Stubborn" - 3:58

Side two

1. "Another Cruel Love" - 3:58
2. "You Ain't Foolin' Me" - 7:03
3. "24 Hours at a Time" - 5:04
4. "Fly Eagle Fly" - 4:25

Shout Factory! 2004 remaster "Another Cruel Love" (Recorded live at the Performing Arts Center, Milwaukee, WI, July 31, 1974) - 4:23

== Personnel ==
- Doug Gray - lead vocals, guitar, percussion
- Toy Caldwell - guitar, steel guitar, slide guitar, lead vocals on "Blue Ridge Mountain Sky" and "Fly Eagle Fly"
- Tommy Caldwell - bass guitar, background vocals
- George McCorkle - guitar, banjo
- Paul Riddle - drums
- Jerry Eubanks - flute, saxophone, keyboards, background vocals
- Paul Hornsby - keyboards
- Charlie Daniels - fiddle
- Jai Johanny Johanson - conga, conductor
- Earl Ford - trombone
- Oscar Jackson - saxophone
- Todd Logan - trumpet
- Harold Williams - saxophone

Production

- Producer: Paul Hornsby
- Recording engineers: Sam Whiteside, Paul Hornsby
- Mastering engineer: George Marino
- Art direction: Wondergraphics, David and Jimmy Holmes
