= Stompin' Room Only: Greatest Hits Live 1974–76 =

Live album by Marshall Tucker Band
- Released: 2003
- Recorded: 1974–1976
- Genre: Southern rock; country rock
- Length: 72:39
- Label: Shout Factory
- Producer: Paul Hornsby

Stompin' Room Only: Greatest Hits Live 1974–76 is an album recorded by the Marshall Tucker Band that contains live recordings from London, Manchester, Milwaukee and Charlie Daniels' "Volunteer Jam" in Murfreesboro. They were planned to be released in 1977, but the tapes were shelved and then lost.

== Track listing ==
No.	Title	Writer(s)	Original album	Length
1.	"Long Hard Ride"	Toy Caldwell	Long Hard Ride	4:22
2.	"This Ol' Cowboy"	Toy Caldwell	Where We All Belong	5:39
3.	"Fire on the Mountain"	George McCorkle	Searchin' for a Rainbow	4:14
4.	"Searchin' for a Rainbow"	Toy Caldwell	Searchin' for a Rainbow	6:28
5.	"Take The Highway"	Toy Caldwell	The Marshall Tucker Band	5:50
6.	"Can't You See"	Toy Caldwell	The Marshall Tucker Band	5:44
7.	"Blue Ridge Mountain Sky"	Toy Caldwell	A New Life	6:52
8.	"The Thrill Is Gone" (featuring congas by Jamie Nichol, drums by Fred Edwards, guitar by Charlie Daniels and Dickey Betts, harmonica by Jimmy Hall, piano by Chuck Leavell)	Rick Darnell, Roy Hawkins		10:49
9.	"Ramblin'"	Toy Caldwell	The Marshall Tucker Band	5:36
10.	"24 Hours at a Time" (featuring fiddle by Charlie Daniels)	Toy Caldwell	A New Life	13:23
11.	"Hillbilly Band"	Toy Caldwell	The Marshall Tucker Band	3:43
Total length:				72:39

== Critical reception ==
Professional ratings
Review scores
Source	Rating
AllMusic	4/5 stars

In a retrospective review by Thom Jurek, AllMusic rated the album 4 out of 5 stars.

== Personnel ==
- Backing vocals – Doug Gray (2) (tracks: 6), George McCorkle (tracks: 11), Jerry Eubanks (tracks: 5, 6, 11), Tommy Caldwell (tracks: 2, 3, 5, 6, 9 to 11)
- Bass guitar – Tommy Caldwell
- Drums – Paul Riddle
- Flute – Jerry Eubanks (tracks: 2 to 6, 11)
- Guitar – George McCorkle (tracks: 8), Toy Caldwell (tracks: 8)
- Lead guitar – Toy Caldwell (tracks: 1, 2, 4 to 7, 9 to 11)
- Lead vocals – Doug Gray (2) (tracks: 2 to 5, 7 to 10), Toy Caldwell (tracks: 6, 11)
- Pedal steel guitar – Toy Caldwell (tracks: 3)
- Percussion – Doug Gray (2) (tracks: 1, 6, 8)
- Rhythm guitar – George McCorkle (tracks: 1 to 7, 9 to 11)
- Saxophone – Jerry Eubanks (tracks: 1, 7 to 10)

== Production ==
- Artwork – Traci Swartz
- Design – Ed Spyra
- Executive producer – Ron Rainey
- Producer – Paul Hornsby
- Recorded by Paul Hornsby
- Remastered by Paul Hornsby
- Package supervised by Traci Swartz
