= Carolina Dreams =

Studio album by the Marshall Tucker Band
- Released: January 1977
- Recorded: 1976, Capricorn, Macon, Georgia
- Genres: Southern rock; country rock
- Length: 37:18 (2005 reissue 41:46)
- Label: Capricorn
- Producer: Paul Hornsby

The Marshall Tucker Band chronology
Long Hard Ride (1976)	Carolina Dreams (1977)	Together Forever (1978)

Professional ratings
Review scores
Source	Rating
AllMusic	4/5 stars
The Rolling Stone Album Guide	3/5 stars

Carolina Dreams is the sixth studio album by the Marshall Tucker Band, released in 1977 and produced by Paul Hornsby. The album is an ode to the band's home state of South Carolina. Focusing on Western themes, it spawned their biggest hit to date, "Heard It In a Love Song", which rose to No. 14 on the Billboard Hot 100, taking the album with it to No. 22 and No. 23 on the Country and Pop charts, respectively. They toured early that year to promote the album. A bonus live version of "Silverado" appears on the 2005 reissue which was recorded the year after the death of bassist and founding member, Tommy Caldwell.

== Track listing ==
All songs written by Toy Caldwell except where noted.

Side one
No.	Title	Writer(s)	Length
1.	"Fly Like an Eagle"		3:03
2.	"Heard It in a Love Song"		4:55
3.	"I Should Have Never Started Lovin' You"	Toy Caldwell, Doug Gray, George McCorkle	7:10
4.	"Life in a Song"	Jerry Eubanks, McCorkle	3:33

Side two
No.	Title	Writer(s)	Length
5.	"Desert Skies"		6:24
6.	"Never Trust A Stranger"	Tommy Caldwell	5:28
7.	"Tell It To The Devil"		6:45
Total length:			37:18

2004 CD reissue bonus track (recorded live 1981 Wintergarden Ballroom - Dallas, Texas)
No.	Title	Writer(s)	Length
8.	"Silverado"	McCorkle	4:28
Total length:			41:46

== Personnel ==
- Doug Gray - lead vocals
- Toy Caldwell - lead, acoustic, and steel guitars
- Tommy Caldwell - bass, tambourine, background vocals
- George McCorkle - electric, twelve string, and acoustic guitars
- Paul Riddle - drums
- Jerry Eubanks - flute, saxophone, background vocals

Guest musicians

- Paul Hornsby - Piano and organ
- Charlie Daniels - Fiddle and harmony vocals on "Desert Skies"
- Chuck Leavell - Piano on "Life in a Song"
- Jaimoe - Congas
- Leo LaBranche - Horn section arrangements and trumpet on "Life in a Song" and "I Should Have Never Started Lovin' You"
- Dezso Lakatos - Tenor sax (as part of horn section)

Production

- Producer: Paul Hornsby
- Recording Engineer: Kurt Kinzel, Richard Schoff, David Pinkston
- Art Direction: Diana Kaylan
- Design: John Kehe
- Photography: David Alexander
- Handlettering: Bill Franks
