= Long Hard Ride =

Studio album by the Marshall Tucker Band
- Released: June 1976
- Genre: Southern rock; country rock
- Label: Capricorn
- Producer: Paul Hornsby

The Marshall Tucker Band chronology
| Searchin' for a Rainbow (1975) | Long Hard Ride (1976) | Carolina Dreams (1977) |

Professional ratings
Review scores
| Source | Rating |
|---|---|
| AllMusic | link |

Long Hard Ride is the fifth studio album by the Marshall Tucker Band, released in 1976 and produced by Paul Hornsby. Guest performers included Charlie Daniels, John McEuen and Jerome Joseph. The title track was made into a short film that was played as a sort of movie trailer. It depicts the members of the band as a gang of cowboys. The album's cover features Frank C. McCarthy's painting "The Last Crossing" (1972). Cover design and art direction John Kosh.

== Track listing ==
All songs written by Toy Caldwell, except where noted.

Side one

1. "Long Hard Ride" - 3:48
2. "Property Line" - 2:57
3. "Am I the Kind of Man" - 4:21
4. "Walkin' the Streets Alone" - 5:05

Side two

1. "Windy City Blues" (Jerry Eubanks, Doug Gray, George McCorkle) - 4:53
2. "Holding On to You" (McCorkle) - 3:48
3. "You Say You Love Me" - 3:57
4. "You Don't Live Forever" (Tommy Caldwell) - 3:55

CD 2004 reissue bonus track

"See You One More Time" - 4:54

== Charts ==
Album

| Year | Chart | Position |
|---|---|---|
| 1976 | Canadian Albums Chart | 64 |
| 1976 | New Zealand Albums Chart | 31 |
| 1976 | US Billboard 200 | 32 |

== Personnel ==
- Doug Gray - lead vocals, percussion
- Toy Caldwell - electric and acoustic guitars, steel guitar, lead vocals on "Property Line"
- Tommy Caldwell - bass guitar, backing vocals
- George McCorkle - electric and acoustic guitars, banjo
- Jerry Eubanks - flute, alto, baritone and tenor saxophone, backing vocals
- Paul Riddle - drums

Production

- Paul Hornsby - Producer
- George Marino - Mastering engineer
