= Dedicated (The Marshall Tucker Band album) =

Studio album by the Marshall Tucker Band
- Released: 1981
- Genre: Southern rock, country rock
- Length: 37:37
- Label: Warner Bros.
- Producer: Tom Dowd

The Marshall Tucker Band chronology
Tenth (1980)	Dedicated (1981)	Tuckerized (1982)

Professional ratings
Review scores
Source	Rating
AllMusic	3/5 stars
The Encyclopedia of Popular Music	3/5 stars

Dedicated is the eleventh studio album by the Marshall Tucker Band. It was "dedicated" to their former bassist and founding member, Tommy Caldwell, who was killed from injuries sustained in a car crash the previous year, and the other Caldwell brother, Timmy, who died under similar circumstances, and to all lost loved ones.

== Track listing ==
All songs written by Toy Caldwell, except where noted.

1. "Rumors Are Raging" – 4:10 (Toy Caldwell, Paul Riddle)
2. "Tonight's the Night (For Making Love)" – 3:57 (George McCorkle)
3. "Love Some" – 2:55 (Alan Tarney, Trevor Spencer)
4. "Silverado" – 4:10 (McCorkle)
5. "Something's Missing in My Life" – 3:31
6. "This Time I Believe" – 3:19
7. "Tell the Blues to Take Off the Night" – 4:51
8. "Special Someone" – 4:01
9. "The Time Has Come" – 2:45
10. "Ride in Peace – Dedicated to Tim and Tommy Caldwell and to All Lost Loved Ones" – 3:58

== Personnel ==
- Toy Caldwell – Guitars, Steel Guitar, Background Vocals
- Doug Gray – Vocals
- Jerry Eubanks – Flute, Saxophone, Keyboards, Background Vocals
- Paul Riddle – Drums, Percussion, Background Vocals
- George McCorkle – Guitars
- Franklin Wilkie – Bass Guitar, Background Vocals

Guest musicians

- Charlie Daniels – Fiddle
- Norton Buffalo – Harmonica
