= Together Forever (The Marshall Tucker Band album) =

Studio album by the Marshall Tucker Band
- Released: 1978
- Genre: Southern rock
- Length: 38:12
- Label: Capricorn
- Producer: Stewart Levine

The Marshall Tucker Band chronology
Carolina Dreams (1977)	Together Forever (1978)	Running Like the Wind (1979)

Professional ratings
Review scores
Source	Rating
AllMusic	3/5 stars

Together Forever is the Marshall Tucker Band's seventh studio album. It was produced by Stewart Levine. It was the band's last studio album for Capricorn Records. It has sold more than 500,000 copies.

== Track listing ==
All songs written by Toy Caldwell, except where noted.

Side one

1. "I'll Be Loving You" - 5:31
2. "Love Is a Mystery" - 7:11
3. "Singing Rhymes" - 3:16

Side two

1. "Dream Lover" (Jerry Eubanks, George McCorkle) - 4:38
2. "Everybody Needs Somebody" (Doug Gray, Jerry Eubanks, George McCorkle) - 4:41
3. "Change Is Gonna Come" (Tommy Caldwell) - 6:29
4. "Asking Too Much of You" - 6:31

2004 CD reissue bonus track

"Bound and Determined" (recorded live November 2, 1975, Armadillo World HQ, Austin, TX)

== Personnel ==
- Doug Gray - Lead vocals and percussion
- Toy Caldwell - Electric and acoustic guitars, steel guitar, shared lead vocals on "Singing Rhymes", lead vocals on "Asking Too Much of You"
- Tommy Caldwell - Bass guitar and background vocals
- George McCorkle - Electric and acoustic guitars, banjo
- Jerry Eubanks - Flute, alto, baritone and tenor saxophone, background vocals
- Paul Riddle - drums

== Charts ==
Album

Year	Chart	Position
1978	Billboard 200	22
1978	Billboard Top Country Albums	26

Singles

Year	Single	Chart	Position
1978	"Dream Lover"	Billboard Hot 100	75
