= Heard It in a Love Song =

Single by The Marshall Tucker Band

from the album Carolina Dreams
- B-side: "Life in a Song"
- Released: March 1977
- Genre: Country rock; Southern rock; pop rock
- Length: 4:55 (album version); 3:29 (single edit)
- Label: Capricorn
- Songwriter: Toy Caldwell
- Producer: Paul Hornsby

The Marshall Tucker Band singles chronology
"Long Hard Ride" (1976)	"Heard It in a Love Song" (1977)	"Can't You See" (1977)

"Heard It in a Love Song" is a song by The Marshall Tucker Band, from their 1977 album Carolina Dreams; it was written by Toy Caldwell.

== Reception ==
Cash Box praised the "pure-toned vocals" and "excellent work on the flute and guitars." Record World said it combines "a flavorful mix of rock and country stylings."

== Chart performance ==
This was the highest-charting single by The Marshall Tucker Band, reaching number 14 on the Billboard Hot 100 chart on June 11, 1977. It also reached number 51 on the Country chart and number 25 on the Adult Contemporary chart. "Heard It in a Love Song" was a bigger hit in Canada, where it reached number 5 on the Pop chart. It also charted higher on their other corresponding national charts.

== Charts ==
=== Weekly charts ===
Chart (1977)	Peak position
Canada Top Singles (RPM)	5
Canada Adult Contemporary (RPM)	31
US Billboard Hot 100	14
US Easy Listening (Billboard)	25
US Cash Box Top 100	10

=== Year-end charts ===
Chart (1977)	Rank
Canada (RPM)	69
US Billboard Hot 100	57
US Cash Box Top 100	37

== Personnel ==
- Doug Gray – lead vocals
- Toy Caldwell – lead & acoustic guitars
- Tommy Caldwell – bass guitar, background vocals
- George McCorkle – rhythm guitar
- Paul Riddle – drums
- Jerry Eubanks – flute, background vocals

Guest musicians

- Paul Hornsby – piano, Hammond organ

== Cover versions ==
- Mark Chesnutt, on his 2006 album of the same name
