= The Marshall Tucker Band (album) =

1973 studio album by The Marshall Tucker Band

Studio album by the Marshall Tucker Band
- Released: April 1973
- Recorded: 1973
- Genres: Country rock; Southern rock
- Length: 34:26
- Label: Capricorn
- Producer: Paul Hornsby

The Marshall Tucker Band chronology
The Marshall Tucker Band (1973)	A New Life (1974)

The Marshall Tucker Band is the debut album by American rock band the Marshall Tucker Band. Released in April 1973, the album was recorded in 1973 in Macon, Georgia, at Capricorn Studios.

== Background ==
"Ab's Song" was written by Toy Caldwell for his wife Abbie before the band officially formed. About the song, Abbie had this to say:

"(Toy) said, 'Listen Ab, what I wrote about you.' I was 19 and he was 21 when we married, so there have been many songs during all those years."

== Artistry ==
The album's musical style incorporates elements of psychedelic, jam band, jazz, R&B, gospel and folk. Guitarist/songwriter Toy Caldwell drew heavily from bluegrass and country while writing songs for the band's debut.

The album's eclectic style has been categorized as country rock and Southern rock.

The lead single, "Can't You See", musically is a mixture of country rock and Southern rock. The lyrics of "Can't You See" are noted as being dark, reflecting heartache and "a man running as far away as he can to begin the process of healing himself".

== Legacy ==
Professional ratings
Review scores
Source	Rating
AllMusic	4/5 stars

In a retrospective review, AllMusic gave the album 4 out of 5 stars. Rolling Stone named the album one of the "50 rock albums every country fan should own". Paste magazine described the album as a "Southern rock classic".

== Track listing ==
All songs written by Toy Caldwell except "Everyday (I Have the Blues)", by Peter Chatman.

Side one
No.	Title	Length
1.	"Take the Highway"	6:10
2.	"Can't You See"	6:00
3.	"Losing You"	5:02

Side two
No.	Title	Length
1.	"Hillbilly Band"	2:32
2.	"See You Later, I'm Gone"	3:01
3.	"Ramblin'"	5:01
4.	"My Jesus Told Me So"	5:28
5.	"Ab's Song"	1:12

Bonus track (not on the original LP release)
No.	Title	Length
9.	"Everyday (I Have the Blues)" (Live at Winterland Auditorium, San Francisco, CA, September 1973)	12:33

== Personnel ==
The Marshall Tucker Band

- Doug Gray - lead vocals, percussion
- Toy Caldwell - lead guitar, steel guitar, lead vocals on "Can't You See", "Hillbilly Band," and "Ab's Song"
- Tommy Caldwell - bass guitar, background vocals, drums on "See You Later, I’m Gone"
- George McCorkle - rhythm guitar, acoustic guitar, percussion
- Paul Riddle - drums
- Jerry Eubanks - flute, alto saxophone, background vocals

Additional musicians

- Paul Hornsby - piano, Fender Rhodes electric piano, Hammond organ, Moog synthesizer

Production

- Producer: Paul Hornsby
- Recording engineers: Paul Hornsby, Buddy Thornton
- Album design and illustration: James Flournoy Holmes
- Photography: C. Hearon, J. Duckworth at Camera House
