= Tenth (The Marshall Tucker Band album) =

Studio album by the Marshall Tucker Band
- Released: 1980
- Recorded: 1980
- Genre: Boogie rock
- Length: 39:52
- Label: Warner Bros.
- Producer: Stewart Levine

The Marshall Tucker Band chronology
Running Like the Wind (1979)	Tenth (1980)	Dedicated (1981)

Tenth is the tenth album by the Marshall Tucker Band. It was recorded in 1980 in Coconut Grove, Florida, at Bayshore Recording Studios. It was the final studio album with Tommy Caldwell, who died from injuries sustained in a car crash later the same year.

== Critical reception ==
Professional ratings
Review scores
Source	Rating
AllMusic	3/5 stars

AllMusic noted the "slick, warm radio-friendly production and boogie rock à la the Doobie Brothers and other contemporaries."

== Track listing ==
All songs written by Toy Caldwell, except where noted.

1. "It Takes Time" - 3:34
2. "Without You" (Tommy Caldwell) - 3:36
3. "See You One More Time" - 3:51
4. "Disillusion" (Jerry Eubanks/George McCorkle) - 3:57
5. "Cattle Drive" (Toy Caldwell/Tommy Caldwell) - 6:19
6. "Gospel Singin' Man" (McCorkle) - 3:26
7. "Save My Soul" - 4:36
8. "Sing My Blues" - 3:27
9. "Jimi" (instrumental) (Toy Caldwell/McCorkle) - 2:14
10. "Foolish Dreaming" (Doug Gray/McCorkle) - 4:52

== Personnel ==
- Doug Gray — lead vocals on all songs except for "Same My Soul"
- Jerry Eubanks — C and alto flutes, backing vocals, soprano, alto, C melody, tenor and baritone saxophones, electric flute, electric saxophones, Fender Rhodes electric piano, vibraphone, percussion
- Toy Caldwell — lead guitar, pedal steel guitar; harmonica on "Without You", lead acoustic guitar on "Gospel Singin' Man", lead vocals on "Save My Soul", backing vocals on "Foolish Dreaming"
- George McCorkle — acoustic and electric rhythm guitars; lead electric guitar on "Disillusion", organ on "Gospel Singin' Man"
- Tommy Caldwell — bass, backing vocals; electric guitar on "Without You"
- Paul Riddle — drums; congas on "Disillusion", backing vocals on "Foolish Dreaming"
