= Running Like the Wind =

Studio album by the Marshall Tucker Band
- Released: 1979
- Genre: Pop rock; jazz fusion
- Length: 38:42
- Label: Warner Bros.
- Producer: Stewart Levine

The Marshall Tucker Band chronology
Together Forever (1978)	Running Like the Wind (1979)	Tenth (1980)

Running Like the Wind is the Marshall Tucker Band's ninth studio album (including the band's 1978 compilation, Greatest Hits) with its title track, "Running Like the Wind," being one of the band's most popular songs. The more jazzy "Last of the Singing Cowboys" was the single from the album, reaching No. 42 on the US Billboard Hot 100. It is their first album recorded for Warner Bros. after the collapse of Capricorn Records.

== Musical style ==
In contrast to the band's earlier albums, the sound of Running Like the Wind draws from pop rock. Jazz fusion also plays a part of the album's sound.

Professional ratings
Review scores
Source	Rating
Allmusic	link

== Track listing ==
All songs written by Toy Caldwell except where noted.

1. "Running Like the Wind" 9:11
2. "Last of the Singing Cowboys" (George McCorkle) 4:16
3. "Answer to Love" 3:43
4. "Unto These Hills" 7:02
5. "Melody Ann" (Tommy Caldwell) 5:27
6. "My Best Friend" (McCorkle) 4:58
7. "Pass It On" 3:46

== Charts ==
Chart (1979)	Position
Australia (Kent Music Report)	99

== Personnel ==
- Doug Gray - Lead vocals and percussion
- Toy Caldwell - Electric and acoustic guitars, steel guitar
- Tommy Caldwell - Bass guitar and background vocals, lead vocals on "Melody Ann"
- George McCorkle - Electric and acoustic guitars, banjo
- Jerry Eubanks - Flute, alto, baritone and tenor saxophone, background vocals
- Paul Riddle - Drums

Credits

- Horns: Steve Madaio, Gary Grant, David Leull, Gary Herbig, Bill Reichenbach Jr. (horns arranged by Steve Madaio).
- Keyboards: Chuck Leavell
- Recorded: Bayshore Recording Studios, Coconut Grove, Florida
- Engineer: David Growther
- Assistant engineer: David Growther
- Mastered: Bernie Grundman, at A&M
- Cover and inner spread photography: David Alexander
- Back cover photography: Steve Smith
- Cover concept: The Marshall Tucker Band
