= Searchin' for a Rainbow =

Studio album by the Marshall Tucker Band
- Released: August 1975
- Recorded: July 31, 1974; May – June 1975
- Genres: Southern rock; country rock
- Length: 32:44
- Label: Capricorn
- Producer: Paul Hornsby

The Marshall Tucker Band chronology
Where We All Belong (1974)	Searchin' for a Rainbow (1975)	Long Hard Ride (1976)

Searchin' for a Rainbow is the fourth studio album by the Marshall Tucker Band, released in 1975.

Professional ratings
Review scores
Source	Rating
Allmusic	link

== Track listing ==
All songs written by Toy Caldwell, except where noted.

Side one

1. "Fire on the Mountain" (George McCorkle) - 3:57
2. "Searchin' for a Rainbow" - 3:48
3. "Walkin' and Talkin'" - 2:25
4. "Virginia" - 4:54

Side two

1. "Bob Away My Blues" - 2:42
2. "Keeps Me from All Wrong" (Tommy Caldwell) - 4:13
3. "Bound and Determined" - 4:20
4. "Can't You See" (recorded live July 11, 1974, at the Performing Arts Center in Milwaukee, Wisconsin) - 6:25

2004 CD reissue bonus track

"It Takes Time" (recorded live April 1980 Ann Arbor, MI) - 3:43

== Personnel ==
- Doug Gray – lead vocals, percussion
- Toy Caldwell – electric and acoustic guitars, steel guitar, lead vocals on "Can't You See"
- Tommy Caldwell – bass guitar, backing vocals
- George McCorkle – electric and acoustic guitars, banjo
- Jerry Eubanks – alto, baritone and tenor saxophone, flute, backing vocals
- Paul Riddle – drums

Guest musicians

- Dickey Betts – guitar solo on "Searchin' For A Rainbow"
- Paul Hornsby – piano, organ
- Charlie Daniels – fiddle
- Chuck Leavell – electric piano
- Jerome Joseph – congas
- Al McDonald – mandolin
- Leo LaBranche – trumpet and horn section arrangements

Production

- Paul Hornsby – producer
- George Marino – mastering engineer

== Charts ==
Album

Year	Chart	Position
1975	The Billboard 200 (USA)	15
1975	Country Albums	21

Singles

Year	Single	Chart	Position
1975	"Fire on the Mountain"	Billboard Hot 100	38
1976	"Searchin' for a Rainbow"	Hot Country Singles	82
1976	"Searchin' for a Rainbow"	Bubbling Under Hot 100	4
