= Where We All Belong =

Studio album /live album by The Marshall Tucker Band
- Released: November 1974
- Recorded: Live at Uhlein Hall, Performing Arts Center, Milwaukee, Wisconsin; July 31, 1974; Capricorn Studios, Macon, Georgia, 1974
- Genre: Southern rock; progressive country; jazz rock
- Length: 74:09
- Label: Capricorn Records
- Producer: Paul Hornsby

The Marshall Tucker Band chronology
| A New Life (1974) | Where We All Belong (1974) | Searchin' for a Rainbow (1975) |

Where We All Belong is the third album by the Marshall Tucker Band. Released in 1974, the double album consists of a studio album and a live album; the former focuses on progressive country songs, while the latter focuses on jazz rock and Southern rock jamming. Musician Charlie Daniels guests on two songs, one from each album.

== Composition ==
Where We All Belong is a double album, consisting of a studio album and a live album. The staff writers of Classic Rock had differing opinions on where the style of the studio disc placed, with one writer opinining that, despite the band's status as a Southern rock group, the studio recordings were not Southern rock at all, but somewhat jazzy, commercial rock music, comparable to the band Chicago. Another staff writer within the same piece said that the studio recordings were progressive country. The live recording fits the categorization of Southern rock more definitively, as well as falling into the genre of jazz rock.

== Reception ==
Professional ratings
Review scores
| Source | Rating |
|---|---|
| Allmusic | 4.5/5 stars |

Stephen Thomas Erlewine wrote for AllMusic, "Although it runs a little long, Where We All Belong captures the sound of The Marshall Tucker Band coming into its own". The staff of Classic Rock magazine gave the album a score of 6.88 out of 10 from 59 votes, with one writer opinining that the album was at its strongest in its rock and blues-oriented material, and at its weakest in its country songs.

== Track listing ==
All songs written by Toy Caldwell, except where noted.

=== Side one ===
1. "This Ol' Cowboy" - 6:42
2. "Low Down Ways" - 3:00
3. "In My Own Way" - 7:17

=== Side two ===
1. "How Can I Slow Down" - 3:19
2. "Where a Country Boy Belongs" - 4:32
3. "Now She's Gone" (Toy and Tommy Caldwell) - 4:20
4. "Try One More Time" - 4:46

=== Side three ===
1. "Ramblin'" - 6:13
2. "24 Hours at a Time" - 13:57

=== Side four ===
1. "Everyday (I Have the Blues)" (Peter Chatman) - 11:48
2. "Take the Highway" - 7:26

CD reissue bonus track

"See You Later, I'm Gone" (Live at Winterland Auditorium in San Francisco, CA, September 1973) - 3:13

== Personnel ==
- Doug Gray – lead vocals, percussion
- Toy Caldwell – electric and acoustic guitars, steel guitar, lead vocals on "This Ol' Cowboy" and "Everyday (I Have the Blues)"
- Tommy Caldwell – bass guitar, backing vocals
- George McCorkle – electric and acoustic guitars, banjo
- Jerry Eubanks – flute, alto, baritone and tenor saxophone, backing vocals
- Paul Riddle – drums

=== Additional musicians ===
- Charlie Daniels – fiddle on “24 Hours At a Time” and "This Ol' Cowboy"
- Elvin Bishop – slide guitar on "Where a Country Boy Belongs"
- Johnny Vernazza – slide guitar on "Where a Country Boy Belongs"
- Billy Sanders – harmonica, rhythm guitar
- Paul Hornsby – piano, organ, clavinet
- Earl Ford – trombone
- Jerry Joseph – conga
- Steve Madaio – trumpet
- Sam McPhearson – harp
- Andy Stein – fiddle
