= Bobby Ogdin =

American musician (born 1945)

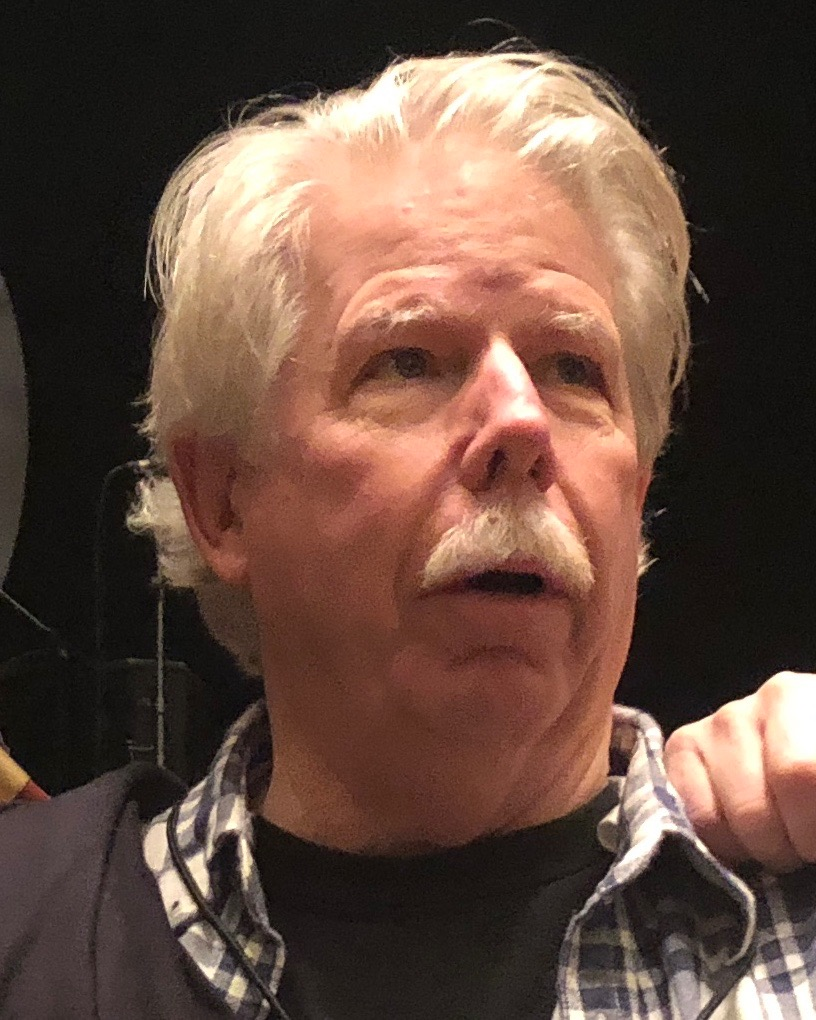
- Bobby Ogdin at Nashville's Ryman Auditorium October, 2018

Background information
- Born: Robert Ford Ogdin; September 28, 1945 (age 81); Detroit, Michigan, USA
- Genres: country, rock, alternative rock
- Occupations: Keyboardist, session musician
- Instrument: Keyboards
- Years active: 1975–present
- Formerly of: TCB Band, Ween, The Marshall Tucker Band
- Website: bobbyogdin.com

Robert Ford Ogdin (born September, 1945) is a Nashville-based recording session pianist. He is best known as a member of Elvis Presley's TCB band. He performed on 20 of Presley's recordings and accompanied him on 45 live shows until Presley's death in 1977. Ogdin's piano playing was synchronized with archival footage of Presley's vocal performance on "Unchained Melody" in the 2022 motion picture, Elvis directed by Baz Luhrman. Ogdin's experiences during the Presley tours have been chronicled in a four-part series of video interviews by Billy Stallings. Over a career spanning four decades as a session musician, Ogdin recorded with country artists including Kenny Rogers, Willie Nelson, George Jones, The Judds, Kenny Chesney, Ray Charles, and Ronnie Milsap. In rock music, he was a member of the Marshall Tucker Band for five years (1984–1989) after departures of some of the original members. He also recorded and performed concerts with the alternative rock band Ween.

== Career ==
Born in Detroit, Ogdin grew up in Knoxville, Tennessee. As a youth, he studied piano and violin from age 4 to 16 and won a Knoxville Symphony Orchestra music-writing contest. His father was an executive at Robertshaw Controls Company; his sister, Sue Ogdin Lynch, is a visual artist. As a teen, he became interested in rock and roll music and played piano and a Hammond B3 organ in local bands. He graduated from the University of Tennessee and attended law school briefly, but realized it was not his calling. He served in the army for two years. Tom Collins, a Nashville record producer whom Ogdin had known as a Sigma Chi fraternity brother in college, urged him to come to Nashville to explore music opportunities. Collins arranged for him to get some work playing on jingles and demo recordings. He worked his way up to become an in-demand studio musician for scores of major artists including Elvis Presley, Willie Nelson, Kenny Rogers, The Judds, Travis Tritt, George Jones, Kenny Chesney, Ray Charles, Barbara Mandrell, Dan Hill, Amy Grant and Ronnie Milsap.

=== With Elvis Presley ===
In 2018, Ogdin was interviewed by Billy Stallings in a four-part video series chronicling Ogdin's experiences on tour with Presley. These first-hand accounts are the source for some of the following information.

In early 1977, a vacancy opened in Elvis Presley's TCB Band when David Briggs resigned. Ogdin was chosen as his replacement primarily by Briggs and by Elvis' record producer Felton Jarvis, seconded by Bob Beckham. When Ogdin accepted, Jarvis told him there were no charts and no rehearsals. He was given a cassette tape of the show to memorize. There were no sound checks for him to attend; the instruments were transported, positioned and tuned by roadies and sound levels and monitors were done by a crew supervised by veteran sound engineer Bill Porter.

Ogdin's debut performance in what would become a series of 45 shows was on March 23, 1977, at Arizona State University in Tempe. He had written himself cue cards to refer to on stage. After the warm-up acts finished, TCB Band members along with the Joe Guercio Orchestra from Las Vegas took their places and began the overture with a dramatic build-up as Elvis appeared and pandemonium followed. Ogdin said, "I was the most excited one in the place". He saw Presley for the first time only then, and Ogdin was seated at the front of the stage fairly close to him. Elvis walked over to Ogdin and shook his hand during the initial crowd reaction, acknowledging Elvis' awareness and collegiality toward the new member. Three powerful spotlights on Elvis blinded Ogdin and his cue cards were of no use.

Elvis' isolation from the other musicians during those days was near complete, to the extent that no band member had any contact with him except during the actual performances. His schedule was opposite from theirs. When the performance was over, he was immediately taken to his own plane and flown to the next city to spend the night and usually slept until the next afternoon. The band stayed in town after the show and left the next morning. Ogdin said, "We stayed in the best hotels and everything was taken care of for us." Wardrobe was provided (seven different pastel outfits) and there was a per diem allowance for food and expenses, so backstage catering was fairly basic. In each city, the people there knew this was a big event, and each hotel where the musicians stayed was full of excitement. Ogdin was amused when people asked for his autograph and brought food and gifts for the band. He said, "You accepted but never ate the food, and the gifts (usually teddy bears) were collected and donated."

Ogdin recalled how they added a new song, "Moody Blue" to the show. An on-the-road rehearsal was called one afternoon and the musicians assembled at the arena, which was already set up for that evening's show. Felton Jarvis called to the stage an Elvis impersonator whom he had hired. This person sang "Moody Blue" (imitating Elvis) standing on Elvis' very spot to rehearse the band.

=== "Unchained Melody" ===
On June 21, 1977, while Ogdin was playing electric piano for Presley at a live concert in Rapid City, South Dakota, he witnessed Presley suddenly going off script— he commandeered the grand piano and started singing Unchained Melody while accompanying himself. This was not on the usual set list and the orchestra members were surprised and unprepared; they remained silent. Elvis continued on the piano but his playing lacked the polish of a studio musician; nevertheless, Jarvis said the vocal was "the best thing 'The King' had done in years" and wanted to save it.

Back in Nashville, Jarvis scheduled Ogdin for an overdub session at Nashville's RCA Studio A to replace the backing music without altering the original vocal. This was nothing new to Ogdin who had overdubbed about 20 of Elvis' previous recordings. "Unchained Melody" had been captured on 24 track tape. Working with engineer Al Patchucki, Jarvis asked Ogdin to come up with a smooth, synchronized piano track to follow Presley's vocal. "This was no easy task", said fellow musician Norbert Putnam, who was there that day waiting to add his bass part after Ogdin finished. Presley's vocal contained rubato passages that did not follow a strict tempo. Ogdin's playing defined a clear framework for the rest of the parts to be added, using two tracks for a stereo effect. Putnam's bass part required several takes, he said, "to perfectly follow Ogdin's left hand". With these two essential parts finished, Jarvis subsequently added many additional musicians and singers; it amounted to creating a new band, one instrument at a time. The final product was first released as a single, then on the album Moody Blue, which shot up on the record charts after Presley's death and ultimately sold two million copies. The video of Presley (with audio overdubs) has been viewed millions of times via YouTube. Four decades later Ogdin's piano part was used with archival footage of Presley's vocal performance on Unchained Melody in Baz Luhrman's 2022 motion picture, Elvis.

=== Presley's death ===
On the day Presley died, August 16, 1977, Ogdin was waiting at a private airport in Nashville along with Felton Jarvis, Randy Cullers, J.D. Sumner, members of the Stamps Quartet and others. They were the last pickup for a large plane, already-airborne, containing the Joe Gurcio Orchestra and others from Los Angeles and Las Vegas. After picking up the Nashville group, the plane was to head for Portland, Maine, for a show scheduled on August 17, 1977. Ogdin said, "The airport wasn't busy and we were about the only people there. We got the news through the air-traffic controllers that Elvis had died." Shortly thereafter Jarvis, who was to be on the plane with them, appeared and said simply and succinctly, "Elvis is dead, everything is cancelled... go home ... act of God". Ogdin said that Jarvis had just been on the phone with Colonel Tom Parker and "act of God" was a phrase from the musicians' contracts that dealt with financial obligations if some disastrous event occurred. Ogdin didn't think it sounded like a phrase Jarvis would use.

== Associated acts ==
The Marshall Tucker Band, one of the major southern rock bands of the 1970s, had an upheaval in 1983 when five of the original seven members quit the band. The two remaining founders, Doug Gray and Jerry Eubanks decided to recruit replacements and carry on. They chose primarily studio musicians including Ogdin, bassist Bob Wray, drummer James Stroud, and guitarists Rusty Milner and Ken Mimms. Ogdin played in the group for five years (1983-1988) and recorded the album Still Holdin' On which yielded two country chart singles, "Hangin' Out in Smokey Places" (No. 44) and "Once You Get The Feel of It" (No. 79).

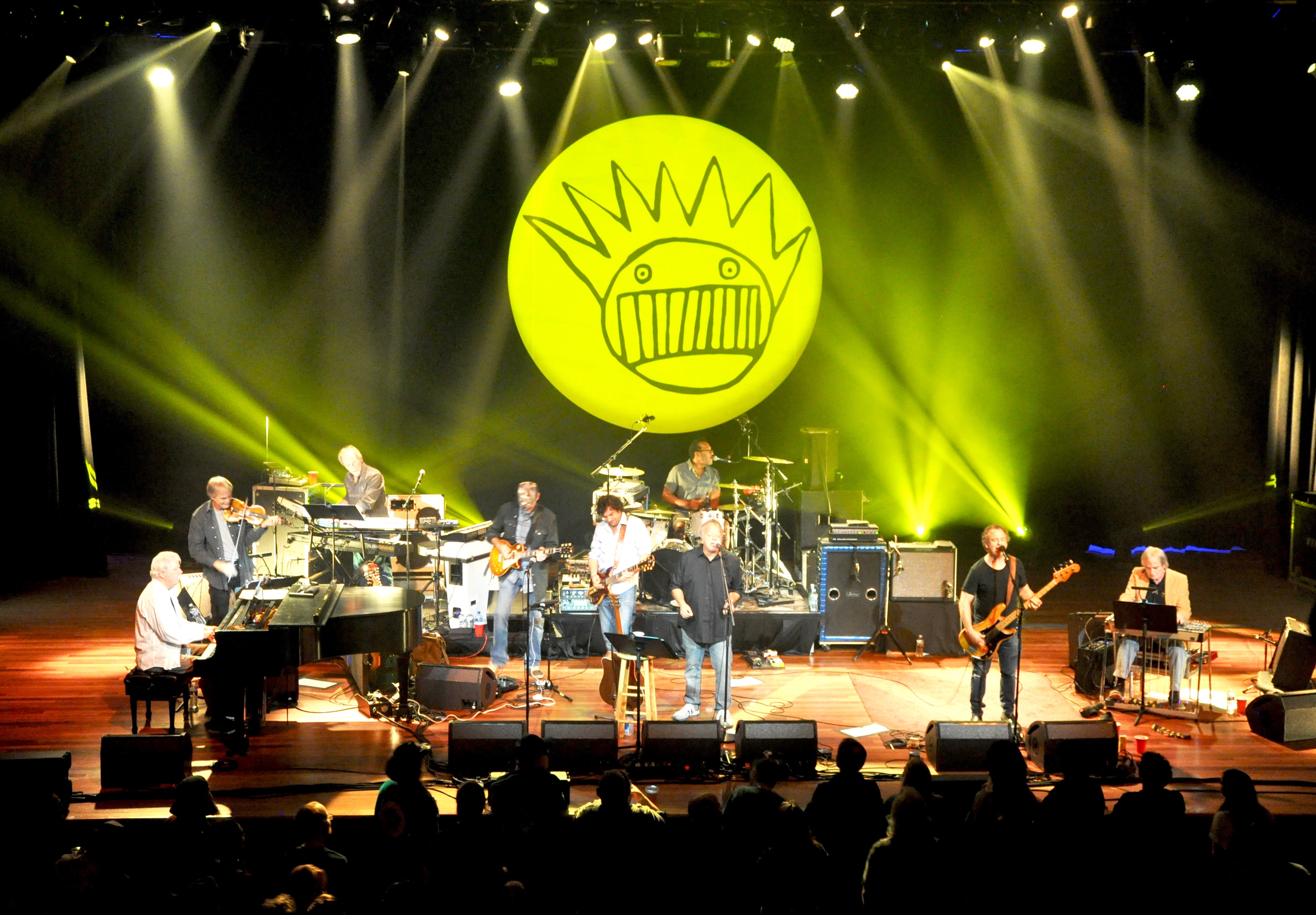
Bobby Ogdin (far left) with Ween, 2018

"Ween", the duo of Aaron Freeman and Mickey Melchiondo, a.k.a. Gene and Dean Ween, built a cult following with their oddball musical parodies in various genres; however, their recordings, said the New York Times, sounded "homemade". That changed in 1996 when they came to Nashville to record a country album on Elektra called "12 Golden Country Greats " (a misnomer since the album contained only 10 songs). This time they used seasoned session players including Charlie McCoy, The Jordanaires, Hargus Robbins, Russ Hicks, and Bobby Ogdin. The success of this association led to Ogdin's being asked to tour with Ween with a backing unit dubbed "Bobby Ogdin and the Shit Creek Boys". One of these shows (from October 1996) was released as a live album entitled "Live in Toronto Canada". Ogdin reunited with Ween for two concerts at Nashville's Ryman Auditorium in October 2018.

== Playing style ==
Ogdin is known musically for his skill in playing to bring out or enhance the vocalist or soloist without overplaying. Although it sounds simple, many otherwise skilled players cannot seem to master it. Barry Beckett, one of the founders of the Muscle Shoals Rhythm Section and later a Nashville record producer, was asked in an interview, "Who would you use for keyboards?" His answer: "There are three: Matt Rollings, John Jarvis, and Bobby Ogdin. Those three really know taste. They know when not to play. That is probably the most important thing".
