= Unto These Hills (disambiguation) =

Unto These Hills could be:

- Unto These Hills, a play first performed in 1940
- "Unto These Hills", a song on The Marshall Tucker Band's album Running Like the Wind
