= Can't You See (The Marshall Tucker Band song) =

1973 single by The Marshall Tucker Band

Single by The Marshall Tucker Band

from the album The Marshall Tucker Band
- B-side: "See You Later, I'm Gone" (original release) "Fly Like an Eagle" (re-release)
- Released: 1973 (original release); 1977 (re-release)
- Recorded: 1973
- Genre: Country rock; Southern rock
- Length: 6:05 (Album version); 3:21 (Single version)
- Label: Capricorn
- Songwriter: Toy Caldwell
- Producer: Paul Hornsby

The Marshall Tucker Band singles chronology
"Can't You See" (1973)	"My Jesus" (1973)
"Heard It in a Love Song" (1977)	"Can't You See" (1977)	"Dream Lover" (1978)

"Can't You See" is a song written by Toy Caldwell of the Marshall Tucker Band. The song was originally recorded by the band on their 1973 self-titled debut album and released as the album's first single. Record World called it "a strong rhythm item that continually builds and builds." A live version was released in 1977 and peaked at number 75 on the Billboard Hot 100. Cover versions of "Can't You See" have charted for Waylon Jennings (in 1976) and the Zac Brown Band with Kid Rock (2010).

A live version, recorded live at the Performing Arts Center in Milwaukee, Wisconsin, on July 31, 1974, is included as the final track on the band's 1975 album Searchin' for a Rainbow. Cash Box said of it that it showcased "their distinctive guitar and flute sounds."

The original recording is noted for its flute introduction and ending, both by Jerry Eubanks.

== Artistry ==
The song, musically, is a cross between country rock and Southern rock.

The lyrics are noted as being dark, reflecting heartache and "a man running as far away as he can to begin the process of healing himself".

== Waylon Jennings version ==
"Can't You See"

Single by Waylon Jennings

from the album Are You Ready for the Country
- B-side: "I'll Go Back to Her"
- Released: July 1976
- Recorded: March 22, 1976
- Studio: Sound Labs (Los Angeles)
- Genre: Country
- Length: 3:46
- Label: RCA Victor
- Songwriter: Toy Caldwell
- Producers: Waylon Jennings; Ken Mansfield

Waylon Jennings singles chronology
"Are You Sure Hank Done It This Way" (1975)	"Can't You See" (1976)	"Are You Ready for the Country" (1976)

"Can't You See" was covered by American country music artist Hank Williams Jr. for his 1975 album Hank Williams Jr. and Friends and also by Waylon Jennings for his 1976 album Are You Ready for the Country. Jennings' version was released as the album's first single in July 1976 and peaked at number four on the Billboard Hot Country Singles chart. It also reached number one on the RPM Country Tracks chart in Canada.

== Other versions ==
Matt Minglewood's band recorded a version on 1979's Minglewood Band album. It is a staple in his live shows to this day, and includes a preamble about the song being about loneliness, painting a picture of a man leaving the rural East Coast of Canada for the Big City and how when his love leaves, he is lonely. Alabama covered the song regularly while touring, but never released it as a single. It ended up on their 1988 live album with lead vocals by Jeff Cook. Halfway to Gone covered the song on their 2002 album Second Season. Black Stone Cherry covered the song on their 2011 album Between the Devil and the Deep Blue Sea. Davey T Hamilton has released two different cover versions of the song. The first is on his 2011 EP Cincy Beerfest 2011. and the second on his 2024 EP Southern Rock.

== Chart performance ==
=== The Marshall Tucker Band ===
Chart (1973)	Peak position
US Bubbling Under Hot 100 (Billboard)	8
Chart (1977)	Peak position
US Billboard Hot 100	75
Canadian RPM Top Singles	57
Canadian RPM Adult Contemporary	39
Chart (2014)	Peak position
Billboard Rock Digital Song Sales	43

=== Waylon Jennings ===
Chart (1976)	Peak position
US Hot Country Songs (Billboard)	4
US Billboard Hot 100	97
Canadian RPM Country Tracks	1

=== Zac Brown Band with Kid Rock ===
Chart (2010)	Peak position
US Bubbling Under Hot 100 (Billboard)	11
