= Alabama Live =

1988 album by the American band, Alabama

Live album by Alabama
- Released: 1988; January 21, 2002 (re-release)
- Studio: Record Plant Mobile Studio (New York City, New York); The Music Mill (Nashville, Tennessee).
- Genre: Country
- Length: 64:05
- Label: RCA Nashville
- Producer: Harold Shedd and Alabama

Alabama chronology
Just Us (1987)	Alabama Live (1988)	Southern Star (1989)

Professional ratings
Review scores
Source	Rating
Allmusic	2/5 stars

Alabama Live is the first live album by the American band Alabama. Released in 1988, it became a Number One album on Top Country Albums chart, marking their inaugural live compilation. The album features live renditions of various singles from the band's career, along with album tracks "Red River", "Fireworks" and "Gonna Have a Party". Additionally, the album includes is a cover of the Marshall Tucker Band's "Can't You See", track never before featured on any of Alabama's studio albums.

== Track listing ==
=== Side One ===
1. "Can't Keep a Good Man Down" (Bob Corbin) – 3:44
2. "Tennessee River" (Randy Owen) – 7:48
3. "Take Me Down" (J.P. Pennington, Mark Gray) – 4:50
4. "Love in the First Degree" (Jim Hurt, Tim DuBois) – 2:56
5. "Red River" (Bud McGuire, George Pearce) – 4:04
6. "Dixieland Delight" (Ronnie Rogers) – 5:10
7. "Lady Down on Love" (Owen) – 3:51

=== Side Two ===
1. "If You're Gonna Play in Texas (You Gotta Have a Fiddle in the Band)" (Dan Mitchell, Murry Kellum) – 3:32
2. "Fireworks" (Ronnie Scaife, Phil Thomas, Kenny Durham) – 3:58
3. "When We Make Love/There's No Way" ("When We Make Love" by Lisa Palas, Will Robinson, John Jarrard; "There's No Way" by Troy Seals, Mentor Williams) – 3:31
4. "Gonna Have a Party" (Bruce Channel, Kieran Kane, Cliff Cochran) – 5:32
5. "Can't You See" (Toy Caldwell) – 7:41
6. "My Home's in Alabama" (Owen, Teddy Gentry) – 8:16

== Personnel ==
=== Alabama ===
- Jeff Cook – keyboards, electric guitar, fiddle, vocals
- Randy Owen – electric guitar, vocals
- Teddy Gentry – bass guitar, vocals
- Mark Herndon – drums

=== Guest musicians ===
- Costo Davis – keyboards
- Joe "Dixie" Fuller – percussion

=== Production ===
- Alabama – producers
- Harold Shedd – producer
- Dave Hewitt – recording engineer
- Kooster McAllister – recording engineer
- Jim Cotton – mix engineer
- Paul Goldberg – mix engineer
- Joe Scaife – mix engineer
- David Zammit – additional live and mix engineer
- Ed "K-9" Celletti – assistant engineer
- Phil Gitomer – assistant engineer
- Peter Hefter – assistant engineer
- Robert Kinkle – assistant engineer
- Fritz Lang – assistant engineer
- J.B. Matteotti – assistant engineer
- Milan Bogdan – digital editing
- Benny Quinn – digital editing, mastering
- Masterfonics (Nashville, Tennessee) – mastering location
- Kym Juister – art production
- Mary Hamilton – art direction, design
- Jim "Señor" McGuire – photography
- Charlie McGallen – hand tinting
- Cheryle Riddle – hair stylist
- Ann Payne Rice – make-up

== Charts ==
=== Weekly charts ===
Chart (1988)	Peak position
US Billboard 200	76
US Top Country Albums (Billboard)	1

=== Year-end charts ===
Chart (1988)	Position
US Top Country Albums (Billboard)	29
Chart (1989)	Position
US Top Country Albums (Billboard)	46

== Certifications ==
Region	Certification	Certified units/sales
United States (RIAA)	Platinum	1,000,000^{^}
^{^} Shipments figures based on certification alone.

== Sources ==
- Alabama Live (cassette liner notes). Alabama. RCA Records. 1988. 6825-4-R.
