= First stage =

First stage or First Stage may refer to:

- First Stage Children's Theater, a professional American children's theater based in Milwaukee, Wisconsin
- First stage (rocketry), the first stage of a multistage rocket
- the first reading of a bill in the parliament of Ireland
- the high pressure regulator of a diving regulator
