= Fire on the Mountain (The Marshall Tucker Band song) =

Single by The Marshall Tucker Band

from the album Searchin' for a Rainbow
- B-side: "Bob Away My Blues"
- Released: 1975
- Recorded: 1975
- Genre: Country rock; Southern rock
- Length: 3:57
- Label: Capricorn
- Songwriter: George McCorkle
- Producer: Paul Hornsby

The Marshall Tucker Band singles chronology
"This Ol' Cowboy" (1975)	"Fire on the Mountain" (1975)	"Searchin' for a Rainbow" (1976)

"Fire on the Mountain" is a song written by George McCorkle of The Marshall Tucker Band. The song was originally recorded by the band on their 1975 album, Searchin' for a Rainbow, and released as the album's first single. It peaked at number 38 on the Billboard Hot 100.

"Fire on the Mountain" was written by George McCorkle in the hopes that his friend Charlie Daniels would record it on the album of the same name. When Daniels decided not to use it, McCorkle recorded it with his band, The Marshall Tucker Band, with Daniels guesting on fiddle. It became the band's first Top 40 hit single and is one of the most popular Southern rock tunes.

The song's lyrics are set during the California gold rush. "Fire on the Mountain" details how a family sets out from their home in South Carolina looking to make some money panning gold. In the end, the singer ends up getting shot and killed, and his widow is left behind with a worthless claim. Toy Caldwell plays steel guitar in the song, but it is out of tune because he didn't know how to tune it properly.

According to the sheet music published at Musicnotes.com by Sony/ATV Music Publishing, the song is composed in the key of G Major with the vocal range spanning from D_{4} to G_{5}.

== Chart performance ==
Chart (1975)	Peak position
US Billboard Hot 100	38
Canadian RPM Top Singles	81
