= It Takes Time =

It Takes Time may refer to:

- "It Takes Time" (Anne Murray song), by Anne Murray
- "It Takes Time", by Trippie Redd from A Love Letter to You
- "It Takes Time", by Fleetwood Mac from Extended Play
- "It Takes Time", by The Marshall Tucker Band from Tenth
- "It Takes Time", by Otis Rush
- "It Takes Time", by Patti Smith and Fred "Sonic" Smith from Until the End of the World
- "It Takes Time", an episode of Summer Camp Island
