= Milwaukee Youth Arts Center =

Wisconsin arts-in-education facility

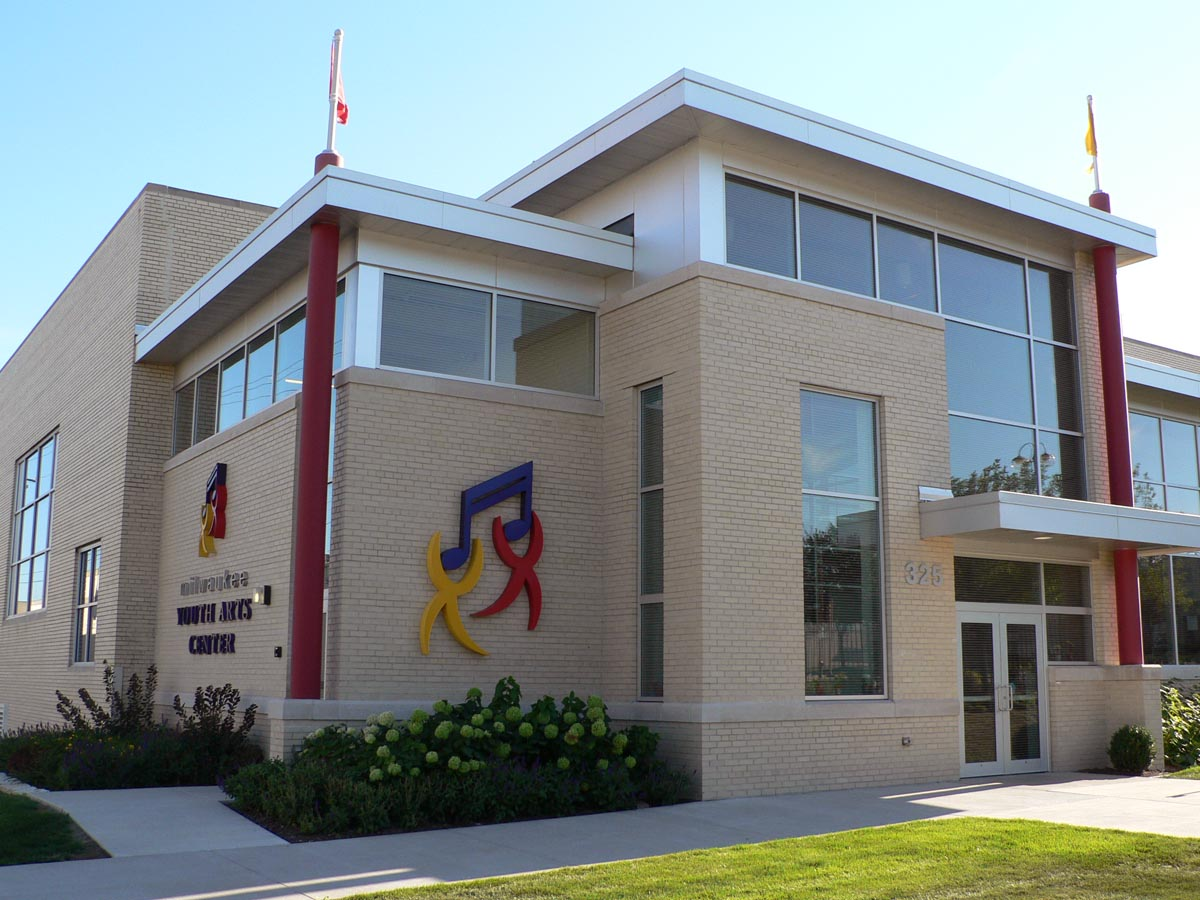
Milwaukee Youth Arts Center

The Milwaukee Youth Arts Center (MYAC) is an arts-in-education facility in Milwaukee, Wisconsin. A performing arts education and rehearsal facility for the young people of southeastern Wisconsin, it provides opportunities for children to express themselves through the arts in a multicultural environment. The facility has rehearsal halls, classrooms, and other training spaces, a theater resource center, a music library, a costume shop, and administrative offices.

The center is a collaboration between First Stage Children's Theater and Milwaukee Youth Symphony Orchestra. It opened in early 2005.

== Programs ==
The Milwaukee Youth Arts Center is home to First Stage Children's Theater, Milwaukee Youth Symphony Orchestra, Danceworks, Festival City Symphony, Milwaukee Children's Choir, and African American Children's Theater, along with other groups who rent the facility for individual events.

== Facility ==
The building includes more than 55,000 sq ft (5,100 m^{2}) of program space. There are five large rehearsal halls with industry-standard acoustic configurations. Nine additional classrooms and two small rehearsal/practice rooms provide soundproofing in order to accommodate a large number of programs at one time. The largest rehearsal hall, the Youth Arts Hall, is 3,800 sq ft (350 m^{2}) and serves as a performance venue for MYSO groups and student productions of the First Stage Theater Academy. In the center of the building is the 3,200 sq ft (300 m^{2}) "Commons" area, which provides an area for parents and students to relax while in the building.

The nine smaller classrooms and two rehearsal/practice rooms are named after figures in theater and music: Duke Ellington, Lorraine Hansberry, Gustav Mahler, Martha Graham, Wolfgang Amadeus Mozart, William Shakespeare, Dmitri Shostakovich, Stephen Sondheim, Konstantin Stanislavski, Arthur Miller, and "B3," which stands for Bach, Brahms, and Beethoven. In 2012, the MYAC board announced that two of the larger halls would be renamed for long-time First Stage and MYSO leaders Rob Goodman and Fran Richman.
