= Marcus Center =

Performing arts venue in Milwaukee, Wisconsin

Coordinates: 43°2′34″N 87°54′41″W

Marcus Performing Arts Center
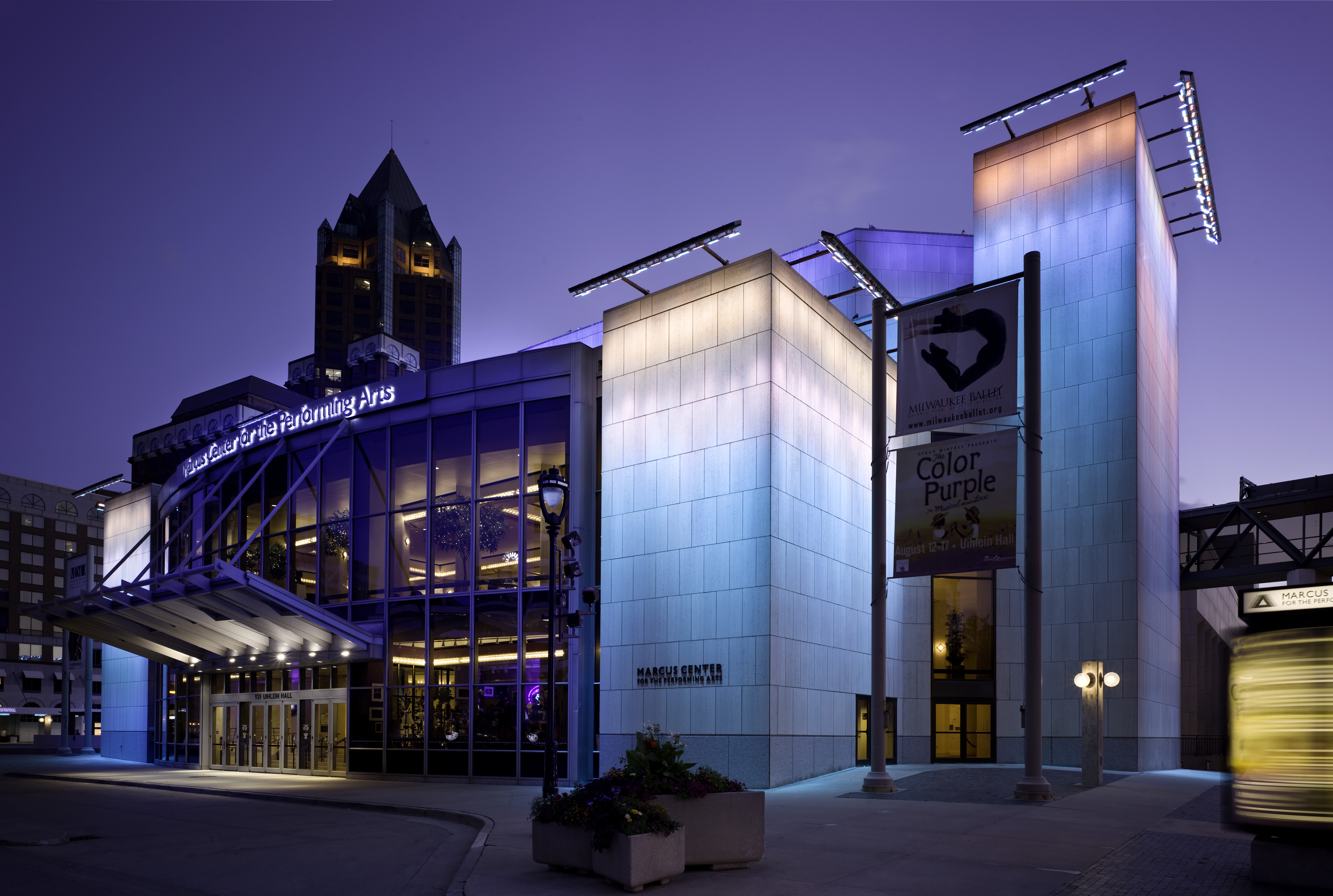
- Marcus Performing Arts Center
- Interactive map of Marcus Performing Arts Center
- Address: 929 N Water St. Milwaukee, Wisconsin
- Capacity: Uihlein Hall: 2,125; Wilson Theater at Vogel Hall: 465; Todd Wehr Theater: 498; Peck Pavilion: 396; Bradley Pavilion: 700; Fitch Memorial Garden: 230; Anello Atrium / Magin Lounge: 250

Construction
- Opened: 17 September 1969

Tenants
- Broadway Across America, Black Arts MKE, First Stage, Florentine Opera, and Milwaukee Ballet

Website
- www.marcuscenter.org

The Marcus Performing Arts Center is a performing arts center in Milwaukee, Wisconsin, United States. Managed by a non-profit organization, it is marketed as Milwaukee's premier presenter of the performing arts. It is located at 929 North Water Street, at the intersection of State Street in downtown Milwaukee, and is a dedicated War Memorial.

Several local companies are resident partners of the Marcus Performing Arts Center, including the Florentine Opera, Milwaukee Ballet, First Stage Children's Theater, Black Arts MKE, and other local arts organizations, and it was also the home of the Milwaukee Symphony Orchestra from 1969 until 2020. The venue is also the presenter of the Johnson Financial Group Broadway at the Marcus Center series through Broadway Across America.

== Building and history ==
The Marcus Center was designed in the Brutalist style by noted Chicago architect Harry Weese. Plans began as early as 1945 for a war memorial to provide for "art, music, drama, public discussion, and social assembly." Construction began on June 27, 1966. Plans called for a major music hall, a thrust stage auditorium for live theater, and a recital hall. Milwaukee County agreed to established two parks in conjunction with the new Center, Red Arrow to the east and Pere Marquette to the west. The boat landing on the Milwaukee River was the precursor to the current Milwaukee RiverWalk. The Performing Arts Center officially opened September 17, 1969. The gala opening included the Milwaukee Symphony, Donizetti’s opera Lucia di Lammermoor and guest appearances by stars of the American Ballet Theatre. Touring acts during the first month of operation included the New York Philharmonic, Duke Ellington, National Ballet of Canada, Hildegarde, and Louis Armstrong.

The Center was bestowed the prestigious Honor Award for Excellence in Architectural Design from the American Institute of Architects in 1970.

After a donation from the Marcus Corporation in honor of its founder Ben Marcus and his wife Ceil, the venue's name was changed in 1994.

=== Theater Venues ===
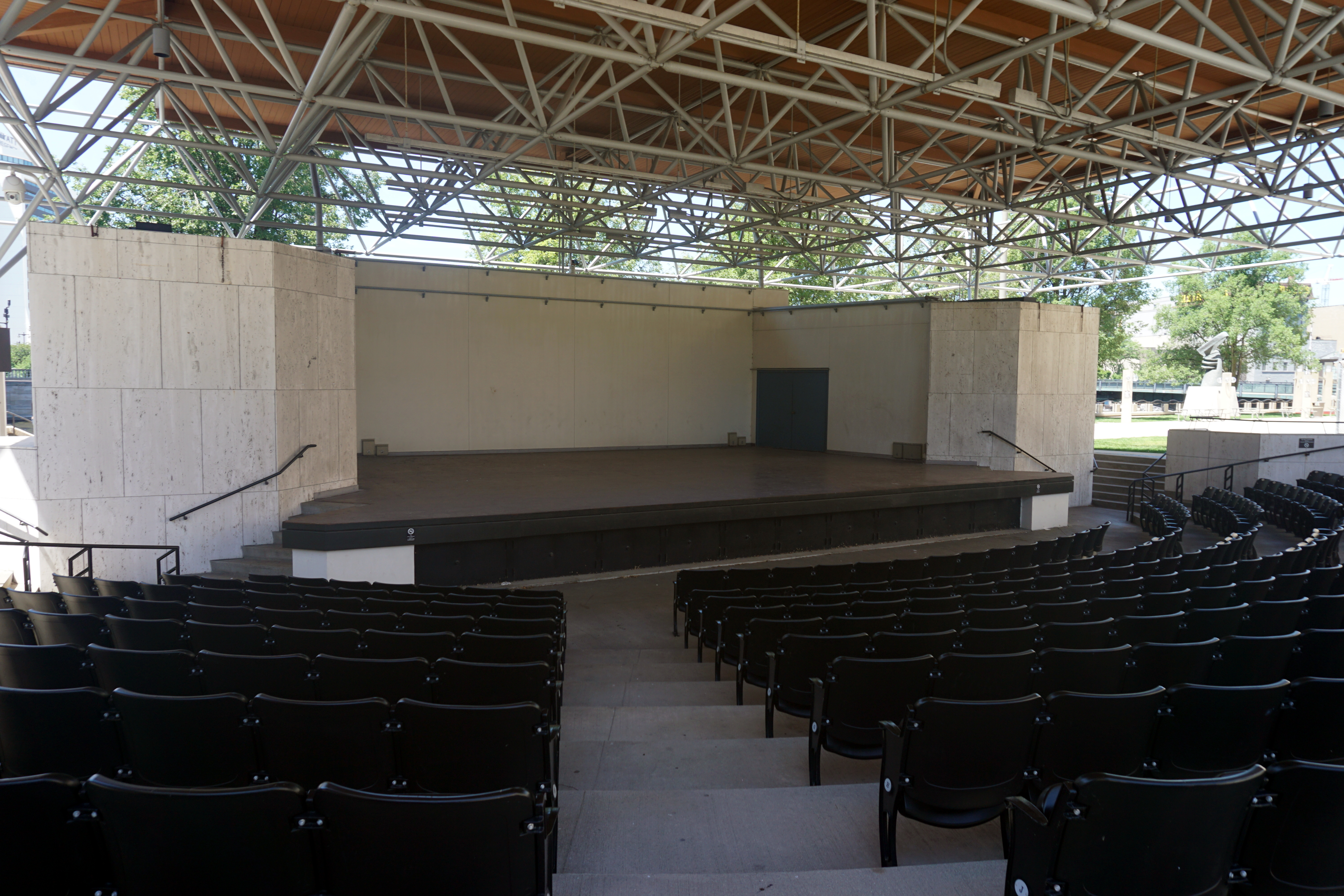
Peck Pavilion

The Center contains four major theater venues and a variety of other spaces:

- Uihlein Hall - Designed for operas, musicals, multi-genre concerts (e.g. pop, jazz, and world music), dance programs, theatrical productions, lectures, annual meetings, commencements, or film screenings, it has a seating capacity of 2,125, and is the largest theater in the Marcus Center. Uihlein Hall is named in honor of the Uihlein family, the owners of the former Joseph Schlitz Brewing Company. It was renovated in 1997 and again in 2020.
- Todd Wehr Theater - Designed for lectures, concerts, plays, conferences and meetings, this hall has a seating capacity of 498.
- Wilson Theater at Vogel Hall - Designed for concerts, plays, dance programs, film screenings, teleconferencing, meetings, seminars, new product introductions, or commencements, this theater has a seating capacity of 465. In 2017, Wilson Theater at Vogel Hall was fully renovated, including a new Riverwalk Entrance and lobby foyer, designed by LA DALLMAN, the Milwaukee and Boston-based architecture practice of Grace La and James Dallman. Renowned for sensitivity to mid-century modern buildings, both La and Dallman are appointed faculty at the Harvard University Graduate School of Design.
- Peck Pavilion - An open-air outdoor theater, located on the Milwaukee River and adjacent to a lawn, the Peck Pavilion is suitable for concerts, film or lecture series, dance programs, dramatic performances, product demonstrations, weddings and receptions. Seated capacity of 402.
- Bradley Pavilion - A banquet hall with floor-to-ceiling glass windows and private balcony overlooking the Milwaukee River. Reception capacity of 700 and seated capacity of 500.
- Studio 4A - A rehearsal hall with floor-to-ceiling mirrors and windows. Seated capacity of 130.
- Green Room - A smaller banquet hall and meeting room. Reception capacity of 110 and seated capacity of 90.
- Anello Atrium & Magin Lounge - With high ceilings and a glass-walled city view, the Anello Atrium & Magin Lounge is located just outside Uihlein Hall.
- Fitch Garden - An outdoor garden with fountain.

In addition, the Center's grounds feature several public artworks including Seymour Lipton's Laureate and Allen Ditson's Trigon.

=== Other ===
The Grateful Dead performed at the venue on three separate occasions; a single show on March 21, 1971, and a two-night stand on October 23-24, 1972.

On July 11, 1974, The Marshall Tucker Band recorded their set at the venue. Four songs from the performance were included on their 1974 album, Where We All Belong, and one song was included on the band's 1975 album, Searchin' for a Rainbow.

Ray Charles performed at the PAC on September 11, 1973.

Jazz legend Ella Fitzgerald joined pianist Oscar Peterson and guitarist Joe Pass in concert at the Pablo Jazz Festival in the Performing Arts Center's Uihlein Hall on Nov. 24, 1976.

Folk singer Joan Baez performed in Uihlein Hall at the Performing Arts Center on July 10, 1979.

Country legends Johnny Cash and his wife, June Carter Cash, shared the stage at the Performing Arts Center on Oct. 1, 1981, in a benefit for the University of Wisconsin-Milwaukee Friends of Music.

Violinist Itzhak Perlman performs a recital at the PAC on March 5, 1984.

The very first Broadway at the Marcus Center season was in 1994 with Grease (November 29 – December 4, 1994), Hello Dolly!, Damn Yankees, Cats, Tommy, and The Phantom of the Opera.

Illumination of the building began on April 16, 2008. Some of the “light paintings” are modeled after Georgia O'Keeffe paintings.

== See also ==
- List of concert halls
