= Trigon (Ditson) =

Artwork by Allen Ditson

- Artist: Allen Ditson
- Year: 1970
- Type: stainless steel
- Dimensions: 370 cm (144 in)
- Location: Milwaukee, Wisconsin; 43.042226°N 87.911519°W
- Owner: Milwaukee County

Trigon is a public art work by American artist Allen Ditson, located in downtown Milwaukee, Wisconsin. The loosely figurative artwork was purchased by the four daughters of Mr. and Mrs. A.P. Rosenberg in their memory at the time of construction of the Performing Arts Center. It is located on the East Kilbourn side of the Performing Arts Center near the Peck Pavilion and a grove of horse chestnut trees.
