= Bob Wray =

Bob Wray, 2024

Bob Wray (Robert T. Wray II) is an American bass guitarist and session musician associated with the Muscle Shoals music scene in Alabama and the Nashville recording industry.

Born in Stevens Point, Wisconsin, he began playing upright bass as a teenager before moving to electric bass. He has recorded with artists including Ray Charles, Johnny Cash, Willie Nelson, George Jones, B. B. King, Roy Orbison, The Osmonds, Al Green and Hank Williams Jr.

Wray's recording career began in the late 1960s. He became a staff musician at FAME Studios in Muscle Shoals in 1970 and subsequently worked as a session bassist in Nashville, where he recorded across country, soul, pop, blues and R&B genres. His credits include recordings with The Osmonds, Clarence Carter, Ray Charles, Conway Twitty, Vern Gosdin and Hal Ketchum.

== Early life and Muscle Shoals ==
Wray was born in Stevens Point, Wisconsin, and grew up in a musical family. His mother played church organ and taught piano. He began playing upright bass in seventh grade and subsequently learned electric bass while attending high school. He met guitarist Travis Wammack while playing in a local band and joined Wammack's touring group in 1968. Wray also played bass with the Marshall Tucker Band in 1984-98 and has been a long-term member of the FAME Gang.

In July 1970, Wray auditioned for work at FAME Studios in Muscle Shoals, Alabama, and became a staff session musician under producer Rick Hall. One of his early recording credits was the Osmonds' single One Bad Apple, which reached number one on the Billboard Hot 100 in 1971. He also participated in sessions for Clarence Carter's album Patches and Z. Z. Hill's The Brand New Z.Z. Hill, recorded at Broadway Sound Studio in 1971. During his time in Muscle Shoals, Wray worked at several recording studios, including FAME Studios, Muscle Shoals Sound Studio, Wishbone, Widget Studio and East Avalon Recorders. His recording collaborators included Candi Staton, Roy Orbison, Mac Davis, Mac McAnally, George Jones and Willie Nelson. More recently, Wray contributed to the 2018 project "Muscle Shoals: Small Town, Big Sound" and has worked with artists Ronnie Milsap, Lucie Tiger and Mark Chesnutt.

== Nashville session career ==
In 1980, Wray relocated to Nashville, Tennessee, where he worked as a session bassist for more than two decades. His recording credits include work with country, pop and R&B performers, including Hank Williams Jr., Reba McEntire, Tanya Tucker, Ronnie Milsap, Kathy Mattea, Etta James, Bobby Womack, Al Green, B. B. King and Amy Grant. Among the recordings on which Wray played bass are Hank Williams Jr.'s Family Tradition (album), Conway Twitty's "Slow Hand", Vern Gosdin's Chiseled in Stone (album) and Hal Ketchum's "Small Town Saturday Night". He also contributed to recordings with Ray Charles, including projects produced by Billy Sherrill. Wray described his work with Charles as one of the highlights of his recording career. Wray also toured with The Highwaymen, the country music supergroup comprising Johnny Cash, Willie Nelson, Waylon Jennings and Kris Kristofferson. He participated in the group's final two tours which included a North America Spring/Summer leg in 1995, an Australian leg in November 1995 plus Singapore, Bangkok and Hawaii, as well as a 1996 Reunion Show in Los Angeles.

== Awards and recognition ==
Wray was nominated for the Academy of Country Music Awards Bass Player of the Year award in 1998. Wray received an Alabama Music Hall of Fame Contemporary Achievement Award as a studio musician in 2001. In 2024, Wray was inducted as a legendary blues artist in the Alabama Blues Hall of Fame,
