= Moore, South Carolina =

Moore
- Unincorporated community
- Location within the state of South Carolina
- Coordinates: 34°50′00″N 81°59′31″W
- Country: United States
- State: South Carolina
- County: Spartanburg
- Elevation: 715 ft (218 m)
- Time zone: UTC-5 (Eastern (EST))
  - Summer (DST): UTC-4 (EDT)
- ZIP codes: 29369
- Area code: 864
- GNIS feature ID: 1231558

Moore is an unincorporated community in Spartanburg County in the U.S. state of South Carolina.

== Geography ==
Moore is located in the Upstate region of South Carolina. Moore is located south of Spartanburg on U.S. Route 221 and is one mile west of Interstate 26.

== Historical Sites ==
Moore is home to two historical houses.

Price's Post Office was listed on the National Register of Historic Places in 1969.

== Agriculture ==
Moore is famous for its Niven's Apple Farm, one of the largest producers and sellers of apples in Spartanburg County. Corn is also a relevant product. Cattle are the main livestock.

== Entertainment ==
At one point, Moore was home to the studio of the Marshall Tucker band. The studio is no longer used, but it still stands on Main Street (South Carolina Highway 290) beside the post office and Presbyterian Church. Moore is the former home of the Bruns Racing Team, which recently refocused its efforts from car racing to airplanes and scuba diving.

== Education ==
Moore boasts three schools. They are part of the Spartanburg District 5 and 6 School system. First is R.D. Anderson Applied Technology and Vocational School, the tech prep center for Byrnes, Dorman, and Woodruff High Schools. River Ridge Elementary is the newest elementary school in Spartanburg District 5. Also, Anderson Mill Elementary School, a part of Spartanburg District 6, and Dawkins Middle School, also part of Spartanburg District 6, are located in Moore.

== Notable residents ==
- Steven Duggar (born 1993), baseball player for the San Francisco Giants
- Toy Caldwell Founder of The Marshall Tucker Band, and a Purple Heart recipient during Vietnam service in the U.S. Marine Corps.
