= First Stage Children's Theater =

American children's theater

The First Stage Children's Theater is a professional American children's theater based in Milwaukee, Wisconsin, founded in 1987. Its season consists of six "mainstage" shows, two shows for very young audiences, and two shows from its award-winning Young Company. First Stage also provides education for children and youth interested in theater.

One of the largest children's theaters in the nation, First Stage has large annual audiences and is the second biggest theater company in Milwaukee. The theater's main performance venue is the Todd Wehr Theater at the Marcus Center, with additional performance space and headquarters in the Milwaukee Youth Arts Center.

== History ==
The First Stage Children's Theater, founded in 1987, was originally named First Stage Milwaukee. The young theater's first season (1987–1988) showed only 3 plays, The Adventures of Huckleberry Finn, Macbeth and The Sleeping Beauty. The theater's model began with a plan to produce one play for young children, one for middle schoolers, and one for high schoolers every season. Since then, it has progressed to include a wide variety of ages, both onstage and off. First Stage now aims to present theater from a young persons point of view, featuring young performers in leading roles. Plays have most often highlighted growth, overcoming challenges, or the importance of individuality.

== First Stage Theater Academy ==
The First Stage Theater Academy was founded in 1992 to teach life skills through stage skills. It is the teaching arm of the theater, and serves more than 2000 students annually.

The Theater Academy provides classes for grades K4 through high school seniors. Classes range from one week, half-day sessions, to four week long, full-day sessions. Classes include Musical Theater, Shakespeare, Improv, Acting Theory, Voice, Movement, and Speech. The Theater Academy provides a Company Class that focuses on a particular play which students perform at the culmination of the class.

The First Stage Theater Academy is also home to the award-winning Young Company, founded by actor, acting instructor, and playwright John Maclay. The Young Company is an advanced acting troupe composed of high school actors, who perform two to three shows per year, as well as traveling to the Utah Shakespeare Festival to compete in their annual youth Shakespeare competition. They have an intensive focus on classical acting techniques and Shakespeare. The Young Company meets in the Milwaukee Youth Arts Center every week for a two hour and forty-five minute intensive class period. The classes are taught by lead teachers Elyse Edelman, Marcella Kearns, and the current company director, Matt Daniels. The Young Company's performance projects are performed in the round in Goodman Mainstage Hall in the Milwaukee Youth Arts Center.
