= Davey T Hamilton =

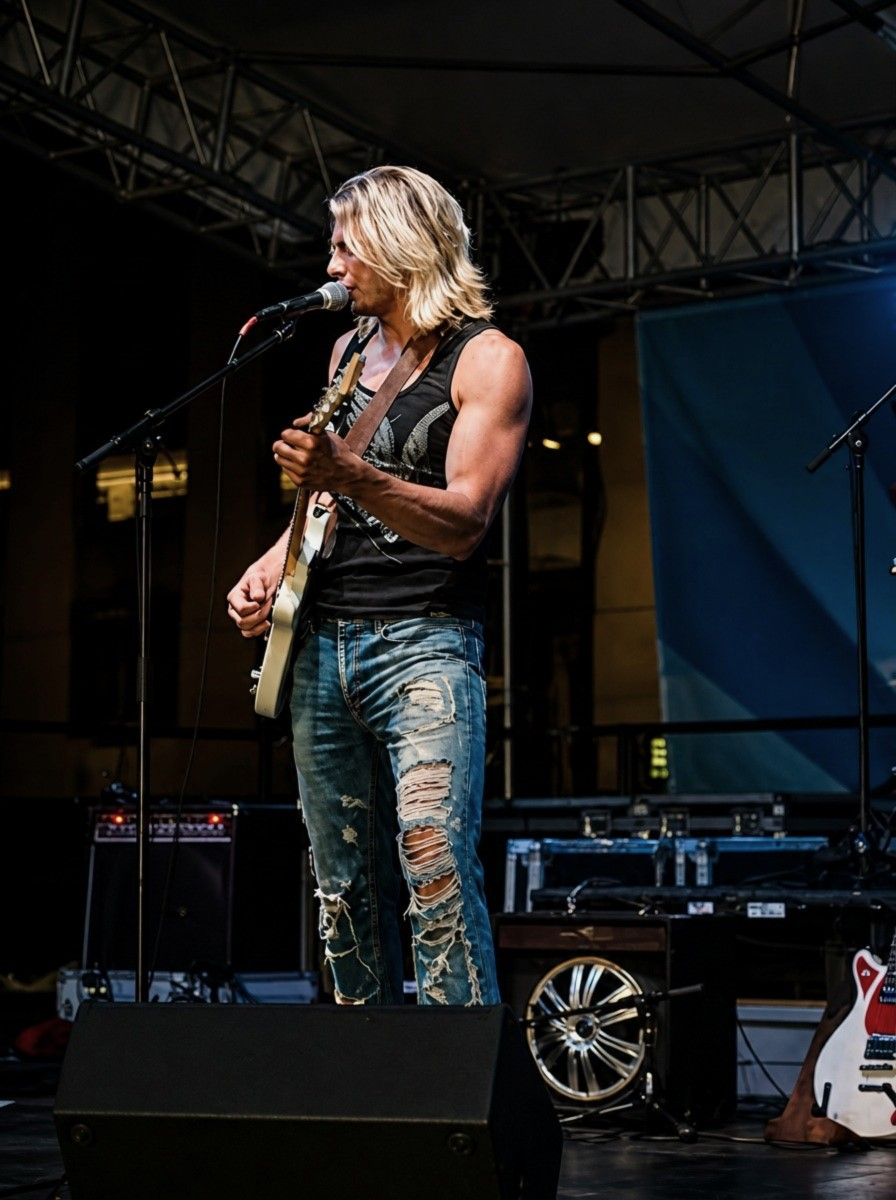
- Davey T Hamilton performing live, 2011

Background information
- Origin: Nashville, Tennessee, U.S.
- Genres: Country rock, Southern rock, pop, gospel
- Occupations: Singer-songwriter, multi-instrumentalist, music producer
- Instruments: Vocals, guitar, bass, piano, harmonica, mandolin, drums
- Years active: 2004–present
- Website: daveyt.com

Davey T Hamilton, also known by the stage name Davey T, is an American singer-songwriter, multi-instrumentalist, and music producer based in Nashville, Tennessee. He has accumulated over 2,000 professional credits across his career as an artist, songwriter, and producer. His musical style incorporates elements of country rock, southern rock, pop, and gospel.

== Early Career and Recording Workflow ==
Hamilton began playing the guitar while attending the University of Kentucky. He is a multi-instrumentalist whose instrumentation includes the guitar, bass, piano, harmonica, mandolin, and drums.

Hamilton later began his recording career from a home studio built on a 12-acre property on Cato Road, north of Nashville. After financing a standalone studio rig by maxing out several credit cards, Hamilton spent a two-year period teaching himself recording techniques while engineering, tracking, and performing all instruments for his self-produced debut album 25 4 Life. His debut commercial single, "Long Night Heartache", was released in May 2007 via the CDX Volume 422 compilation.

In his later production workflow, Hamilton has adopted a hybrid approach that integrates human performances with artificial intelligence tools. He tracks core instrumentation and live vocals natively within Pro Tools and Cubase, while utilizing AI software to generate supplementary audio beds to manage mixing and engineering overhead.

== Music Row and Songwriting Career ==
After 25 4 Life was passed to guitarist Daniel Joseph Schafer at the Nashville Palace, Hamilton was introduced to the Nashville publishing community. This connection led to an association with the Music Row songwriting circuit and a publishing deal.

Hamilton spent six years working as a songwriter in Nashville. During this period, he collaborated in writing rooms with industry figures such as Walt Aldridge, Chris Gantry, David Malloy, and Josh Osborne. In 2005, he recorded a body of work known as The Dixie Road Demos, which emerged from the initial demos of his first batch of songs co-written with Chris Gantry.

During a co-writing session for an album with a Grammy-nominated producer and songwriter credited with over 40 number-one hits, a creative disagreement dissolved the relationship; subsequently, ASCAP Vice President Ralph Murphy began representing Hamilton to major record labels. While these label meetings resulted in rejections due to formatting misalignments, Murphy successfully connected Hamilton with Nashville Music Row publishing houses. The co-writing sessions unlocked by these connections yielded a large catalog of demos and formed the basis of Hamilton's album, How You Go.

Major labels ultimately declined to distribute or sign the project, citing a lack of conformity to mainstream commercial country radio formats. Hamilton released How You Go independently as his final project of that era before stepping away from the music industry due to professional burnout.

== Later Releases and Projects ==
Following an extended hiatus, Hamilton returned to releasing music independently, creating and managing projects from his private home studio. His subsequent releases include:

- 6 Years (2013)
- Classics (2013)
- Band Demos 2014 (2016)
- 2016 (2016)
- Southern Rock (2024)
- "One Vision" (2024)
- "Iris" (2025)
- Man I Am (2025)
- Backroad Symphony (2025)
- "Fast Cars and Loud Guitars" (2026)

In mid-2026, Hamilton announced a retrospective archival project compiling his early independent recordings, unreleased studio sessions, and his past Music Row demos to document his career timeline.

== Discography ==
=== Studio Albums ===
- 25 4 Life (2004)
- The DIXIE ROAD DEMOS (2005)
- Starting Today (2007)
- Country Boy (2009)
- How You Go (2011)

=== Compilations ===
- 6 Years (2013)
- Band Demos 2014 (2016)
- Demo Favorites (Rough Mix) (2020)

=== Extended Plays (EPs) ===
- Cincy Beerfest 2011 (2011)
- Classics (2013)
- 2016 (2016)
- God Fearing Rockstar (2021)
- Beat of My Heart (2024)
- Southern Rock (2024)
- Man I Am (2025)
- Backroad Symphony (2025)

=== Singles ===
- "Long Night Heartache" (May 2007)
- "Fly Away" (2013)
- "Feel Like Makin' Love" (2018)
- "One Vision" (2024)
- "Old Mistake (2013 Mix)" (2024)
- "Missing You" (2024)
- "Southern Girls" (2025)
- "Iris" (2025)
- "Bitter Sweet Symphony" (2025)
- "Midnight Rider" (2025)
- "Mama I'm Coming Home" (2025)
- "Werewolf" (2025)
- "What Mama Used to Say (Remastered)" (2026)
- "Big Ifs (Remastered)" (2026)
- "I've Got It All (Remastered)" (2026)
- "Fast Cars and Loud Guitars" (2026)
