= James Flournoy Holmes =

Flournoy Holmes is an established visual artist and musician. Growing up in the southern piedmont, Spartanburg South Carolina, the son of two artistically inclined parents, his father was a musician and his mother a ceramics teacher and they encouraged his drawing abilities at an early age.

He is an artist whose work is featured on several notable album covers, including the first album from the Marshall Tucker Band, the Allman Brothers' Eat a Peach, Dr. John's In the Right Place, and Charlie Daniels' Fire on the Mountain. He is also credited with photography work for Carole King (Touch the Sky), The Outlaws (Hurry Sundown) and others. He and his brother, David Powell, founded the graphics studio Wonder Graphics. According to an interview with Dr. John, the triple gatefold artwork for the album was taken from the walls of the artist's home in New Orleans at the time.

His mushroom images at that time exploded upon the world music scene and have become international icons.
