= The Marshall Tucker Band =

American band

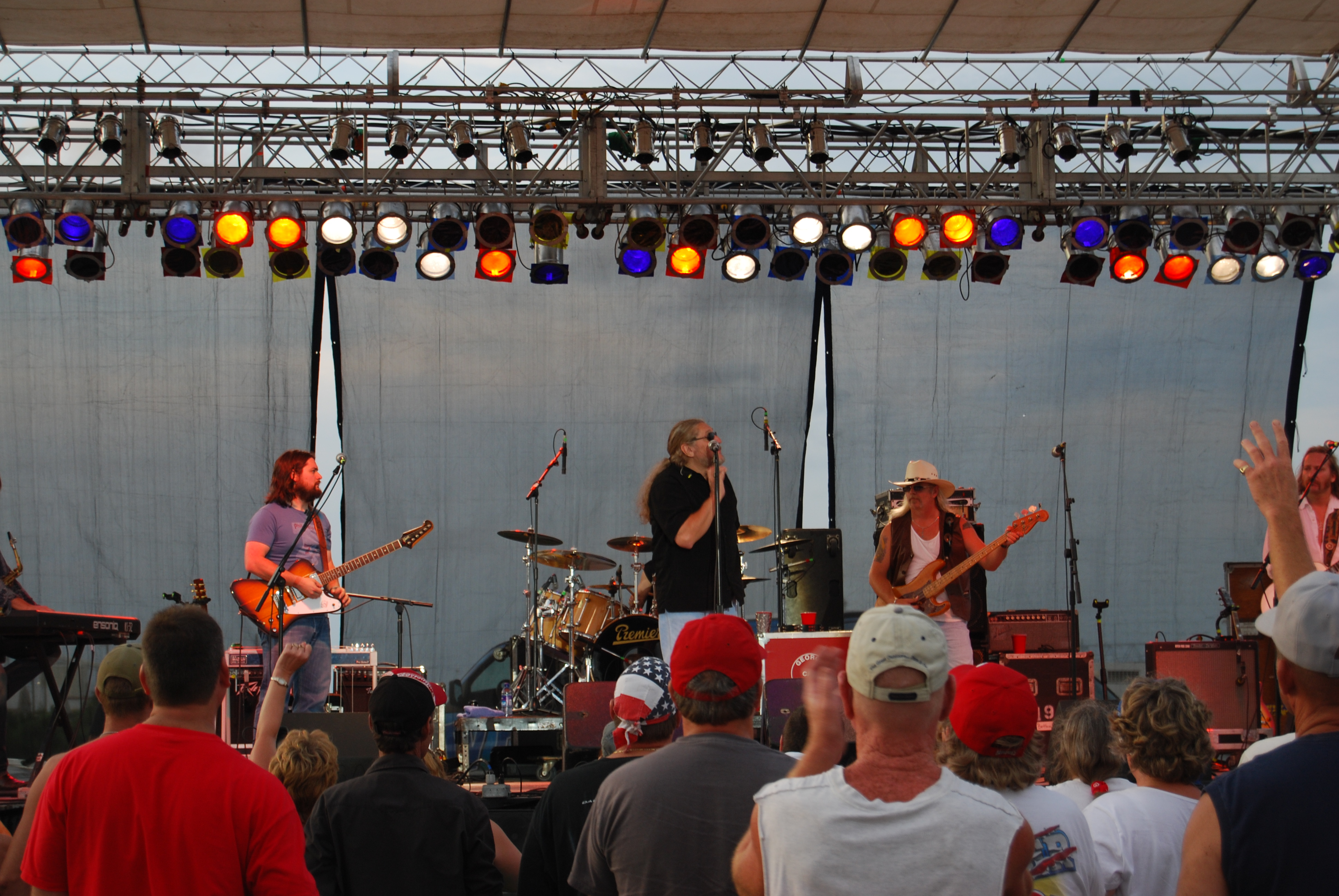
- The Marshall Tucker Band in 2006

Background information
- Origin: Spartanburg, South Carolina, U.S.
- Genres: Southern rock; country rock; progressive country; blues rock; jazz rock
- Years active: 1972–present
- Labels: Capricorn, Warner Bros., Mercury, Cabin Fever, Ramblin'
- Members: Doug Gray; Marcus James Henderson; Chris Hicks; Rick Willis; Ryan Ware; Leroy Wilson; Chris Anderson
- Past members: Jerry Eubanks; Toy Caldwell; George McCorkle; Paul Riddle; Todd Davis; Tommy Caldwell; Franklin Wilkie; Stuart Swanlund; Rusty Milner; Tim Lawter; Ronnie Godfrey; Bobby Ogdin; Bob Wray; James Stroud; Tom Robb; Ace Allen; Don Cameron; Frank Toler; Mark Pettey; Ronald Radford; Paul Thompson; Garry Guzzardo; David Muse; Clay Cook; Tony Heatherly; Pat Elwood; Tony Black
- Website: marshalltucker.com

The Marshall Tucker Band is an American band from Spartanburg, South Carolina. Noted for incorporating blues, country, rock and jazz into an eclectic sound, the Marshall Tucker Band helped establish the Southern rock genre in the early 1970s. While the band had reached the height of its commercial success by the end of the decade, it has recorded and performed continuously under various line-ups for 50 years. Lead vocalist Doug Gray remains the only original member still active with the band.

The original line-up of the Marshall Tucker Band, formed in 1972, included lead guitarist, vocalist and primary songwriter Toy Caldwell (1947–1993), lead vocalist Doug Gray (born 1948), keyboard player, saxophone player and flautist Jerry Eubanks (born 1950), rhythm guitarist George McCorkle (1946–2007), drummer Paul Riddle (born 1953) and bassist Tommy Caldwell (1949–1980). They signed with Capricorn Records and released their first album in 1973, The Marshall Tucker Band.

After Tommy Caldwell was killed in a car accident in 1980, he was replaced by bassist Franklin Wilkie. Most of the original band members had left by 1984. The band's current line-up consists of Gray on vocals; keyboard player, saxophonist and flautist Marcus James Henderson; guitarists Chris Hicks, Rick Willis, and Chris Anderson, bassist Ryan Ware and drummer Leroy Wilson.

== History ==
=== Early history ===
The original members (and some later members) of the Marshall Tucker Band had been playing in various line-ups under different band names around the Spartanburg area since the early 1960s. In 1966 members of several such bands merged to form the Toy Factory, named after guitarist Toy Caldwell. The Toy Factory's constantly shifting line-up included, at various times, Caldwell, his younger brother Tommy, Doug Gray, Jerry Eubanks, George McCorkle and Franklin Wilkie. In the late 1960s, four of the band members served in the US military; Toy Caldwell served in the Marine Corps and received a Purple Heart after being wounded in Vietnam.

By the 1970s, Toy Caldwell and George McCorkle had returned to Spartanburg and the Toy Factory had resumed playing in area clubs.

In 1972 Caldwell and McCorkle once again revamped the band's line-up, eventually settling on Tommy Caldwell on bass/backing vocals, George McCorkle rhythm guitar/banjo, vocalist Doug Gray and Jerry Eubanks, keyboards/flute/tenor sax/backing vocals, while adding Paul Riddle on drums; the new line-up adopted the name "Marshall Tucker Band".

Wet Willie lead singer Jimmy Hall told Toy Caldwell to book the band at Grant's Lounge in Macon, Georgia, which he did. After hearing the band play at Grant's Lounge, Buddy Thornton and Paul Hornsby recorded the band's demo at Capricorn Studios. Frank Fenter and Phil Walden signed the Marshall Tucker Band to Capricorn Records based on those demos.

=== 1970s ===
The Marshall Tucker Band's self-titled debut, produced by Paul Hornsby, was released in 1973 and certified gold in 1975. All of the tracks were written by Toy Caldwell, including "Can't You See" which was also lead sung by Toy, released as a popular single in 1973 and re-released in 1977, generating much FM airplay and becoming the group's best known song. After the album's release, the band began touring, playing upwards of 300 shows per year throughout the decade. Southern rock fiddler Charlie Daniels later recalled that the Marshall Tucker Band "came onstage and just blew it out from start to finish."

Daniels' first of many collaborations with the Marshall Tucker Band came on the band's second album, A New Life, which was released in 1974 and certified gold in 1977. Daniels and blues guitarist Elvin Bishop were among several musicians that joined the band for Where We All Belong, a double-album (one studio album and one live album) released by the band in 1974 and certified gold that same year.

The following year the band's Searchin' for a Rainbow was also certified gold the year of its release and contained the track "Fire on the Mountain," which peaked at No. 38 on the Billboard charts.

Long Hard Ride, the band's fifth consecutive gold album, was released in 1976, and its instrumental title track (which again featured Charlie Daniels on fiddle) was nominated for a Grammy.

Carolina Dreams, released in 1977 and certified platinum that same year, proved to be the band's most commercially successful album, and included the track "Heard It in a Love Song", which reached No. 14 on the Billboard charts.

The band's final Capricorn release was 1978's Together Forever, which was produced by Stewart Levine.

Following the bankruptcy of Capricorn, the Marshall Tucker Band moved to Warner Bros. Records in 1979 for their ninth album, Running Like the Wind (the band's eighth release was a compilation album entitled Greatest Hits), and they retained Levine as the album's producer.

=== 1980s ===
On April 22, 1980, following the completion of the band's tenth album Tenth, bassist and co-founder Tommy Caldwell suffered massive head trauma in a car wreck and died six days later. Former Toy Factory bassist Franklin Wilkie replaced Caldwell for their next album, Dedicated (1981), but the band was never able to recapture its commercial success of the 1970s.

On 1982's Tuckerized, which featured Ronnie Godfrey, who joined them as an additional keyboardist, only two songs were written by band members; "Sea, Dreams & Fairy Tales" by Toy Caldwell and "Sweet Elaine" by George McCorkle. And main songwriter Toy Caldwell only contributed three songs to each of their next two albums, both released in 1983; Just Us and Greetings from South Carolina. Afterwards, all the rest of the original band members split in June 1984, except for Doug Gray and Jerry Eubanks.

During the summer of 1984, MTB toured with a revamped lineup featuring Gray, Eubanks, Spartanburg guitarist Rusty Milner and new Nashville players: Bob Wray (bass), James Stroud (drums), Kenny Mims (guitar) and Bobby Ogdin (keyboards). But in 1985, Wray, Stroud and Mims were replaced respectively by session veteran Tom Robb (from Leslie West's Wild West Show), Stuart Swanlund (guitars, slide guitar, pedal steel guitar, vocals) and David "Ace" Allen (drums).

In 1988 Gray and Eubanks released the album Still Holdin' On, their one and only release on the Mercury Records label, which had been recorded mostly back in 1985 in Nashville with the 84/85 mostly Nashville players lineup.

Bassist Tim Lawter joined in 1987, and the other newer members: Rusty Milner, Stuart Swanlund and "Ace" Allen (including newly added, in 1989, keyboardist Don Cameron) had a much greater role on the band's 1990 album, Southern Spirit, released on the Sisapa label. The album marked a return to the band's country and blues roots.

=== 1990s ===
In 1992 the Marshall Tucker Band produced its first album for the Cabin Fever label, Still Smokin'. Just after the album's recording, drummer David "Frankie" Toler (ex-Allman Brothers Band) replaced Allen on drums and Mark Pettey replaced Don Cameron later that same year on keyboards.

The band's 1993 release, Walk Outside the Lines, marked a transition to a more country sound, relying less on long improvised jams that were the trademark of the band's early career. The album's title track was co-written by country music star Garth Brooks, a long-time fan of the band who considered writing a track for them a "milestone" in his career.

The band added Spartanburg-area guitarist Ronald Radford in 1993 to 1995 after Swanlund suffered a hand injury, and Radford appeared on 1998's Face Down In the Blues, along with Firefall's multi-instrumentalist David Muse, the latter replacing Jerry Eubanks who had retired in 1996. But Swanlund was back in the band from 1995 till his death in 2012 and Muse was there from 1996 to 2000, then again in 2003–2009.

Garry Guzzardo replaced drummer Toler in 1994-1996 and was succeeded by Barry "BB" Borden (ex-Mother's Finest) in 1997, guitarist Chris Hicks joined in 1996, after a long stint in the Outlaws, and keyboardist Paul Thompson (who came in after Pettey left) was briefly a member in 1994, but was dropped pretty soon after and not replaced. He was killed in a motorcycle accident in 1999.

Gospel, the band's 1999 album, featured the band's rendition of traditional songs including "The Wayfaring Stranger", "Will the Circle Be Unbroken", and several original tracks.

=== 21st century ===
Clay Cook (saxophone, flute, keyboards, vocals) was a member from 2000 to 2009 and Dave Muse returned in 2003–2009 before being succeeded by current man Marcus James Henderson in 2009. Longtime bassist Tim Lawter was succeeded by Tony Heatherly in 2001, who turned it over to Pat Elwood in 2004. Guitarist Rusty Milner left in 2003 and Stuart Swanlund was there on and off (his health permitting) from 1985 until his death on August 5, 2012, at age 54. The current guitarists are Chris Hicks (since 1996) and Rick Willis (since 2009) and bassist Tony Black was there from 2017 to 2019. Ryan Ware has occupied the bass chair since the band returned to the road in 2021, after the COVID-19 pandemic.

The Marshall Tucker Band continued recording and performing into the 21st century, playing between 150 and 200 shows per year. The band reissued many of its albums from the 1970s on its new Ramblin' Records label, as well as two two-disc compilations, the first (Anthology) being a 30-year retrospective and the second (Where a Country Boy Belongs) being a collection of the band's country songs. In 2004 they released another studio album, Beyond the Horizon and the following year released a Christmas album, Carolina Christmas. In 2007 they released their most recent studio album The Next Adventure.

In early 2025, drummer Leroy Wilson arrived to take over the drum chair from "BB" Borden, and in April 2025, lead singer/front man Doug Gray temporarily stepped away from performing with the group due to health issues. As of January 2026, Gray has resumed touring. In March 2026, guitarist Chris Anderson joined the band to step in for Rick Willis. The singing in the band was handled by guitarists Hicks and Willis and sax/flute/keyboard player Marcus James Henderson while Gray was absent.

"Can't You See" was used for the opening and closing credits of the Kevin Costner 2008 motion picture Swing Vote. "Take the Highway" was also used in the movie.

"Can't You See" is also used in the 2001 film Blow and the 2017 film I, Tonya.

== Origins of name ==
The "Marshall Tucker" in the band's name refers not to a band member, but to a blind piano tuner from Spartanburg. The band was discussing possible band names one evening in an old warehouse they had rented for rehearsal space. Someone noticed that the warehouse's door keychain had the name "Marshall Tucker" inscribed on it, and suggested they call themselves "The Marshall Tucker Band," not realizing it referred to an actual person.

It later came to light that Tucker had tuned a piano in the rented space before the band, and it was his name inscribed on the keychain. Tucker died on January 20, 2023, at age 99; at the time of his death, it was reported that Tucker supported the band's use of his name and that he was "proud of them as long as they were good boys and played good music".

The music historian Joel Whitburn erroneously attributes "Marshall Tucker" to the owner of the band's rehearsal hall in his book Top Pop Singles, 1955-2002.

== Musical style ==
Tommy Caldwell described the Marshall Tucker Band's music as progressive country, explaining that the band played country music structures and riffs combined with jazz improvisation upon which more complex structures were built from the country music foundation. In 1977, Billboard identified the Marshall Tucker Band as major performers of the genre. Aside from progressive country, the band has also been categorized as Southern rock, blues rock, country rock, jazz rock, and as a "proto-jam band". Billboard charts have categorized the band as country, blues and adult contemporary.

The band has incorporated throughout its career elements of diverse genres into its sound, most frequently blues, country and jazz. The band has also drawn from boogie, psychedelic, R&B, gospel, folk, and rock and roll. According to Allmusic's Jeff Tamarkin, Toy Caldwell's guitar playing style was categorized by "flashy, jazzy licks"; the band has also been noted for extensive jamming. The Marshall Tucker Band's use of instruments like flutes and saxophones, as well as their fusion of rock instrumentation and country melodies, set them apart from other Southern rock bands.

Remembering the early years in 2012, Doug Gray describes the band as being like ''a bowl of soup like your mom would cook. Whatever was in the refrigerator was all thrown in there, and however it tasted was what it was.'' As Gray remarks, the result was so eclectic that the press didn't really know what to make of them as they failed to fit neatly in any pigeonhole.

== Members ==
=== Current ===
- Doug Gray - vocals, percussion (1972–present)
- Chris Hicks - lead guitar, vocals (1996–present)
- Rick Willis - rhythm guitar, vocals (2009–present)
- Marcus James Henderson - flute, sax, keyboards, vocals (2009–present)
- Ryan Ware - bass, vocals (2021–present)
- Leroy Wilson - drums (2025–present)
- Chris Anderson - rhythm guitar, vocals (2026–present)

=== Former ===
- Toy Caldwell – lead guitar, steel guitar, vocals (1972–1984; died 1993)
- Tommy Caldwell – bass, percussion, backing vocals (1972–1980; his death)
- George McCorkle – rhythm guitar, banjo (1972–1984; died 2007)
- Paul Riddle – drums, percussion, backing vocals (1972–1984)
- Jerry Eubanks – flute, saxophones, keyboards, backing vocals (1972–1996)
- Franklin Wilkie – bass, backing vocals (1980–1984)
- Ronnie Godfrey – keyboards, backing vocals (1982–1984)
- Kenny Mims – rhythm guitar (1984–1985; died 2020)
- Bob Wray – bass (1984–1985)
- Rusty Milner – lead guitar, vocals (1984–2003)
- James Stroud – drums (1984–1985)
- David "Ace" Allen – drums (1985–1992)
- Bobby Ogdin – keyboards (1984–1989)
- Stuart Swanlund – rhythm guitar, vocals (1985–1993, 1995–2009, died 2012)
- Tom Robb – bass (1985–1987; died 2006)
- Tim Lawter – bass, backing vocals (1987–2001)
- Don Cameron – keyboards, vocals (1989–1992)
- Mark Pettey – keyboards (1992–1994)
- Frankie Toler – drums (1992–1994; died 2011)
- Ronald Radford – rhythm guitar (1993–1995)
- Garry Guzzardo – drums (1994–1996)
- Paul Thompson – keyboards (1994; died 1999)
- David Muse – flute, sax, keyboards, backing vocals (1996–2000, 2003–2009; died 2022)
- Clay Cook – flute, sax, keyboards, vocals (2000–2003)
- Tony Heatherly – bass (2001–2004)
- Pat Elwood – bass (2004–2017)
- Tony Black – bass (2017–2020)
- Barry "BB" Borden - drums, percussion, vocals (1997–2025)

== Discography ==
=== Studio albums ===
Year	Album	Chart positions			RIAA	Label
Year	Album	US	US Country	CAN	RIAA	Label
1973	The Marshall Tucker Band	29	—	—	Gold	Capricorn
1974	A New Life	37	—	35	Gold	Capricorn
1974	Where We All Belong (2-LP; one album studio, one album live)	54	—	91	Gold	Capricorn
1975	Searchin' for a Rainbow	15	21	—	Gold	Capricorn
1976	Long Hard Ride	32	21	64	Gold	Capricorn
1977	Carolina Dreams	23	22	7	Platinum	Capricorn
1978	Together Forever	22	26	24	Gold	Capricorn
1979	Running Like the Wind	30	—	—	—	Warner Bros.
1980	Tenth	32	—	—	—	Warner Bros.
1981	Dedicated	53	—	—	—	Warner Bros.
1982	Tuckerized	95	—	—	—	Warner Bros.
1983	Just Us	204	—	—	—	Warner Bros.
1983	Greetings from South Carolina	202	—	—	—	Warner Bros.
1988	Still Holdin' On	—	—	—	—	Mercury
1990	Southern Spirit	—	—	—	—	Sisapa
1992	Still Smokin'	—	—	—	—	Cabin Fever
1993	Walk Outside the Lines	—	—	—	—	Cabin Fever
1998	Face Down in the Blues	—	—	—	—	K-Tel
1999	Gospel	—	—	—	—	K-Tel
2004	Beyond the Horizon	—	—	—	—	
2005	Carolina Christmas	—	—	—	—	
2007	The Next Adventure	—	—	—	—	

=== Live albums ===
Year	Album	Chart positions			RIAA	Label
Year	Album	US	US Country	CAN	RIAA	Label
1974	Where We All Belong (2-LP; one album studio, one album live)	54	—	91	Gold	Capricorn
1975	Searchin' for a Rainbow (1-LP; studio album with one live track retained from the Where We All Belong live show)	15	21	—	Gold	Capricorn
2003	Stompin' Room Only: Greatest Hits Live 1974-76	—	—	—	—	Shout! Factory
2006	Live on Long Island 04-18-80	—	—	—	—	Shout! Factory
2007	Carolina Dreams Tour '77	—	—	—	—	Shout! Factory
2010	Way Out West! Live From San Francisco 1973	—	—	—	—	Shout! Factory
2013	Live! From Spartanburg, South Carolina (September 19, 1995)	—	—	—	—	Shout! Factory
2014	Live! Englishtown, NJ - September 3, 1977	—	—	—	—	Ramblin'
2015	Live in the UK 1976	—	—	—	—	Ramblin'
2019	Live At Pleasure Island '97	—	—	—	—	Mountain Man Music [Fr]
2019	New Years In New Orleans: Roll Up '78 and Light Up '79!	—	—	—	—	MT Industries, Inc.

=== Compilation albums ===
Year	Album	Chart positions			RIAA	Label
Year	Album	US	US Country	CAN	RIAA	Label
1978	Greatest Hits	67	19	68	Platinum	Capricorn
1994	The Capricorn Years	—	—	—	—	Era
1996	Country Tucker	—	—	—	—	K-Tel
1997	The Encore Collection	—	—	—	—	BMG
1997	MT Blues	—	—	—	—	K-Tel
1998	Keeping the Love Alive	—	—	—	—	Rebound
2005	Anthology: The First 30 Years	—	—	—	—	Shout! Factory
2006	Where a Country Boy Belongs	—	—	—	—	Shout! Factory
2008	Collector's Edition	—	—	—	—	Madacy
2009	Love Songs	—	—	—	—	Shout! Factory
2009	The Essential MTB 3.0	—	—	—	—	Shout! Factory
2011	Greatest Hits (Expanded Edition)	—	—	—	—	Ramblin'

=== Singles ===
Year	Single	Peak chart positions						Album
Year	Single	US	US Country	US Rock	CAN	CAN Country	CAN AC	Album
1973	"Can't You See"	108	—	—	—	—	—	The Marshall Tucker Band
1973	"Take the Highway"	—	—	—	—	—	—	The Marshall Tucker Band
1974	"Another Cruel Love"	—	—	—	—	—	—	A New Life
1975	"This Ol' Cowboy"	78	—	—	—	—	—	Where We All Belong
1975	"Fire on the Mountain"	38	—	—	81	—	—	Searchin' for a Rainbow
1976	"Searchin' for a Rainbow"	104	82	—	—	—	—	Searchin' for a Rainbow
1976	"Long Hard Ride"	—	63	—	—	—	—	Long Hard Ride
1977	"Heard It in a Love Song"	14	51	25	5	38	24	Carolina Dreams
1977	"Can't You See" (Re-release)	75	—	—	57	—	39	Greatest Hits
1978	"Dream Lover"	75	—	—	80	—	—	Together Forever
1978	"I'll Be Loving You"	—	—	—	—	—	—	Together Forever
1979	"Last of the Singing Cowboys"	42	—	—	97	—	—	Running Like the Wind
1979	"Running Like the Wind"	—	—	—	—	—	—	Running Like the Wind
1980	"It Takes Time"	79	—	—	—	—	—	Tenth
1980	"Without You"	—	—	—	—	—	—	Tenth
1981	"This Time I Believe"	106	—	—	—	—	—	Dedicated
1981	"Silverado"	—	—	60	—	—	—	Dedicated
1981	"Tell the Blues to Take Off the Night"	—	—	—	—	—	—	Dedicated
1981	"Love Some"	—	—	—	—	—	—	Dedicated
1982	"Mr. President"	—	—	—	—	—	—	Tuckerized
1982	"Reachin' for a Little Bit More"	—	—	—	—	—	—	Tuckerized
1983	"A Place I've Never Been"	—	62	—	—	—	—	Just Us
1984	"I May Be Easy But You Make It Hard"	—	—	—	—	—	—	Greetings From South Carolina
1987	"Hangin' Out in Smokey Places"	—	44	—	—	—	—	Still Holdin' On
1988	"Once You Get the Feel of It"	—	79	—	—	—	—	Still Holdin' On
1988	"Still Holdin' On"	—	—	—	—	—	—	Still Holdin' On
1990	"Stay in the Country"	—	_	—	—	—	—	Southern Spirit
1992	"Driving You Out of My Mind"	—	68	—	—	—	—	Still Smokin'
1993	"Walk Outside the Lines"	—	71	—	—	—	—	Walk Outside the Lines
1998	"Love I Gave To You"	—	—	—	—	—	—	Face Down In The Blues
"—" denotes releases that did not chart

== Music videos ==
Year	Video	Director
1981	"Even a Fool Would Let Go"	
1981	"Silverado"	
1990	"Stay in the Country"	
1990	"Destruction"	
1992	"Driving You Out of My Mind"	George Bloom
1992	"Frontline"	
1992	"Tan Yard Road"	
1993	"Walk Outside the Lines"	D. Gray, J. Gerik
1993	"Down We Go"	D. Gray, J. Gerik, K. Mandel
