= Doug Gray =

American musician

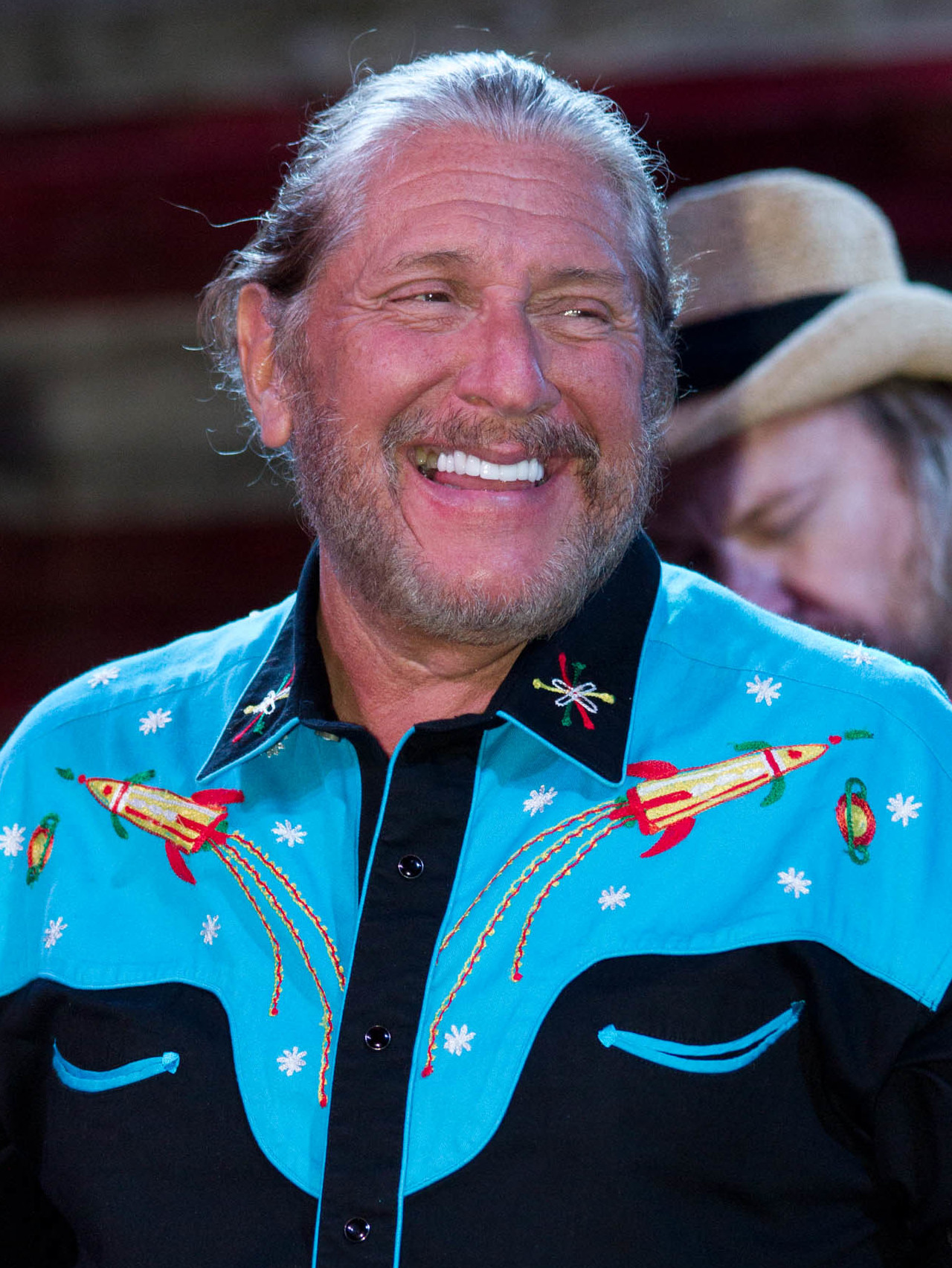
- Gray in 2014

Background information
- Born: May 22, 1948 (age 78); Spartanburg, South Carolina, U.S.
- Genres: Progressive country, Southern Rock, Country Rock
- Occupations: Singer, songwriter
- Instruments: Vocals, keyboards, tambourine
- Years active: 1960s–present

Douglas Gray (born May 22, 1948) is an American singer who is a founding member and lead vocalist of The Marshall Tucker Band.

== Biography ==
Doug Gray was born on May 22, 1948 in Spartanburg, South Carolina. While high school mates, Gray and bassist Tommy Caldwell joined a band called The New Generation. The band consisted of Gray on vocals, Tommy Caldwell on bass, Randy Foster on rhythm guitar, Keith Wood on lead guitar, Dan Powell on organ;, and Ross Hanna on drums. In 1968, they co-wrote a single, "Because of Love (It's All Over)" and released it on a 45 rpm record. After high school, The New Generation merged with another local band, The Rants, which included: guitarist, Toy Caldwell (brother of Tommy); saxophonist, keyboardist and flutist, Jerry Eubanks; and drummer, Ross Hanna (1951-2019), to form a new band called the Toy Factory. As the Vietnam War dragged on, many of the members joined various military branches with Gray joining the Army and serving in the Vietnam War.

After his duty in the military, Gray rejoined the Caldwell brothers and Eubanks of the Toy Factory. They recruited guitarist George McCorkle along with drummer Paul Riddle. By 1972, they had changed their band name to The Marshall Tucker Band, after the name of a man who was a piano tuner in the cotton-mill city of Spartanburg. Gray remained with the band for its entire career and he is the only original member who still performs with the band today.

Gray sang lead on most of the band's songs. There are several exceptions to this in the band's catalogue, including "Can't You See," "Every Day I Have The Blues", and "This Ol' Cowboy", which all featured founder and guitarist Toy Caldwell as the lead singer. In addition to singing, Gray also sometimes plays tambourine and in the band's early days he played keyboards.
