= Paul Hornsby =

American musician and record producer

Paul Hornsby is an American musician and record producer who has produced gold and platinum records for artists including the Charlie Daniels Band, The Marshall Tucker Band, and Wet Willie.

== Overview ==
Paul Hornsby started playing music at an early age. His first professional experience came in 1962 in the band the 5 Men-its. By 1967, he was playing with Duane and Gregg Allman in the Hour Glass. After that time, Hornsby began a producing career, first with Capricorn Records, then as an independent. He has produced albums by such artists as Charlie Daniels, the Marshall Tucker Band, and Wet Willie. He has also performed with Elvin Bishop, Captain Beyond, Gerry Goffin, and Livingston Taylor. He owns his own recording studio and still has his own band, Coupe De Ville.

Singles Hornsby has produced include "The South's Gonna Do It Again", "Long Haired Country Boy", "Heard It in a Love Song", and "Fire On The Mountain".

== Musical contributions ==
Paul Hornsby has performed with:

- The 5 Minutes
- The Men-its
- Hour Glass
- South Camp
- Gregg Allman
- Elvin Bishop
- Captain Beyond
- Gerry Goffin
- Livingston Taylor
- Grinderswitch
- Marshall Tucker Band
- Alex Taylor on 'Alex Taylor with friends and neighbours' and 'Dinnertime' (both on Capricorn Records).

Sugar Creek Band

== Relevant literature ==
- Hornsby, Paul. 2021. Fix it in the mix: A memoir. Macon, GA: Mercer University Press.
