= Tommy Caldwell (musician) =

American musician (1949–1980)

- Also known as: Tommy Caldwell
- Born: Thomas Michael Caldwell; November 9, 1949; Spartanburg, South Carolina, U.S.
- Died: April 28, 1980 (aged 30) Moore, South Carolina, U.S.
- Genres: Southern rock
- Occupations: Musician, songwriter
- Instruments: Bass, vocals, drums
- Years active: 1973–1980
- Formerly of: The Marshall Tucker Band

Thomas Michael Caldwell (November 9, 1949 – April 28, 1980) was an American musician who was the bassist for the Marshall Tucker Band between 1972 and 1980.

Caldwell composed several of their songs and played bass, percussion, and guitar, as well as contributing backup vocals, except for "Melody Ann", the only song on which he performed lead vocals. His last performance with the band was on April 18, 1980, four days before his fatal accident. The performance is captured on the 2006 release, Live on Long Island. Caldwell was known for playing a white 1970s Fender Precision Bass with a Dimarzio Split Coil Pickup. A mix of finger styles and picked bass, as well as his use of tube amplifiers, contributed to Caldwell's signature sound.

A native of Spartanburg, South Carolina, he died on April 28, 1980 at the age of 30 from injuries suffered when his Land Cruiser clipped a parked 1965 Ford Galaxie on April 22, 1980.

The Charlie Daniels Band's 1980 album Full Moon is dedicated to Caldwell.

== Personal life ==
He was the younger brother of bandmate and band co-founder Toy Caldwell. Both served in the Marine Corps during the Vietnam War, with Toy serving in Vietnam.

Another brother, Tim Caldwell, also died in a traffic accident one month before Tommy on March 28, 1980 at age 25.
