= Toy Caldwell =

American musician (1947–1993)

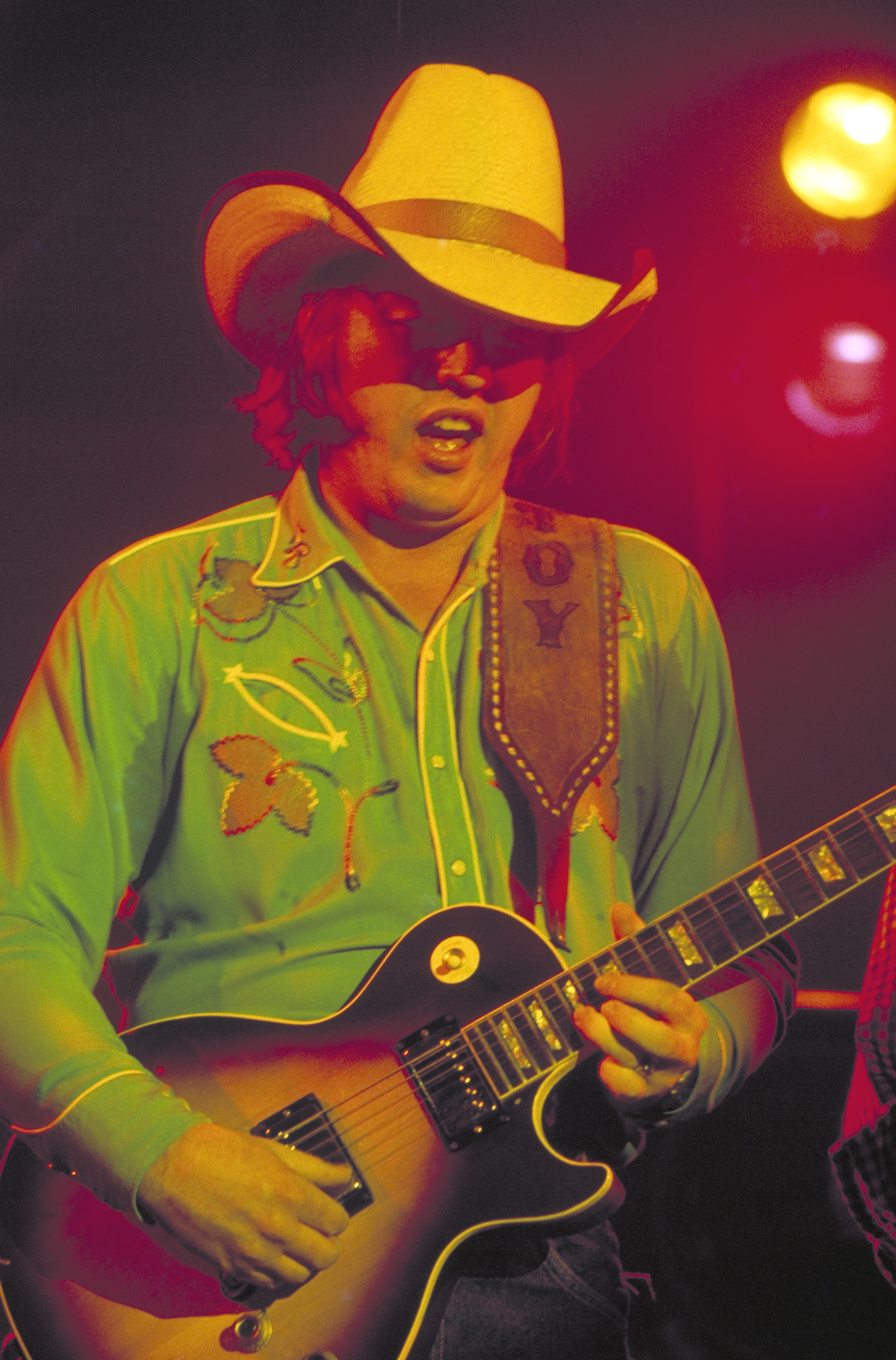
- Toy Caldwell during a 1974 concert.

Background information
- Born: Toy Talmadge Caldwell Jr. November 13, 1947; Spartanburg, South Carolina, U.S.
- Died: February 25, 1993 (aged 45) Moore, South Carolina, U.S.
- Genres: Southern rock, country rock, rock
- Occupations: Musician, songwriter
- Instruments: Guitar, vocals, pedal steel guitar
- Years active: 1972–1993
- Formerly of: The Marshall Tucker Band; Toy Caldwell Band

Toy Talmadge Caldwell Jr. (November 13, 1947 – February 25, 1993) was an American musician who was most notable as the lead guitarist and main songwriter of the 1970s Southern rock group the Marshall Tucker Band. A founding member of the band, Caldwell remained with the group until 1984. In addition to his role as lead guitarist, he was also the band's steel guitarist, and performed lead vocals including on one of the band's best-known hits, "Can't You See."

== Early life ==
Caldwell was born November 13, 1947, in Spartanburg, South Carolina, to Mr. and Mrs. Toy Talmadge Caldwell Sr. He began playing guitar before his teen years with his younger brother Tommy Caldwell. He developed a unique style of playing, strumming the electric guitar using his thumb rather than a pick. Toy played basketball and football in high school with friends George McCorkle, Jerry Eubanks, and Doug Gray. While very involved in sports, the boys eventually became interested in music, including jazz and blues. By the age of 16, Caldwell was passionate about music, sports, and his other obsession, motorcycles. He also enjoyed hunting and fishing.

Caldwell decided to enlist in the United States Marine Corps. In 1966, he reported for recruit training at Parris Island, South Carolina. After being wounded in Vietnam in September 1968, he was evacuated for two weeks, then returned for duty. Caldwell was discharged in 1969 and once again began playing music with his high school buddies. The Spartanburg chapter of the Marine Corps League is named the Hutchings-Caldwells Detachment in honor of Toy, his brother Tommy, and another Marine, Private Nolan Ryan Hutchings, who was killed during the Iraq invasion in 2003.

== Career ==
=== The Marshall Tucker Band ===
Returning to Spartanburg from his military service, Caldwell formed the Toy Factory band with Franklin Wilkie, Doug Gray, and Jerry Eubanks. Younger brother Tommy Caldwell joined in 1973 when Wilkie left and the band became the Marshall Tucker Band. Toy Caldwell was the group's lead guitarist and main songwriter.

=== Later career ===
He later formed the Toy Caldwell Band and released an eponymous CD in 1992; the record was later renamed Son of the South by Southern country rocker and Caldwell's personal friend, Charlie Daniels. The album was digitally re-released in 2009 through Hopesong Digital/GMV Nashville.

== Personal life ==
Caldwell married his wife Abbie on September 12, 1969. The song "Ab's Song" from the Marshall Tucker Band's debut album was written for her. He was also the father of two girls.

He had two younger brothers, both of whom died in car crashes in early 1980: Timothy Caldwell died in a collision with a local garbage truck on March 28, 1980, and Marshall Tucker Band co-founder and bass guitarist Tommy Caldwell was killed a month later when his Land Cruiser rolled over after hitting a parked car.

Death

Toy Caldwell was found dead in bed by his wife, Abbie, on February 25, 1993, at his home in Moore, South Carolina. The cause of death was reported as cardiorespiratory failure due to viral myocarditis, by Spartanburg County Coroner Jim Burnett. Nevertheless, a toxicologist's report found that the cause of death was a cardiac arrest brought on by cocaine use.
