= George McCorkle =

American rock musician (1946–2007)

- Born: George Freeman McCorkle; October 11, 1946; Chester, South Carolina, U.S.
- Died: June 29, 2007 (aged 60) Lebanon, Tennessee, U.S.
- Genre: Southern rock
- Occupations: Songwriter, musician
- Instruments: Guitar, vocals
- Years active: 1968–2007
- Labels: Capricorn, Warner Bros.

George McCorkle (October 11, 1946 – June 29, 2007) was a founding member and guitarist for the Marshall Tucker Band. He wrote "Fire on the Mountain", the band's first top 40 hit, though had hoped that Charlie Daniels would record the song. He left the band in 1984 and later worked as a songwriter. He released a solo album, American Street, in 1999. McCorkle was diagnosed with cancer in early June 2007 and died soon afterward, in Lebanon, Tennessee.

== Early career ==
As s teenager, McCorkle taught himself to play his older brother's guitar, mimicking the blues stylings of B.B. King and other artists he heard on the radio. At sixteen, he purchased his own Gretsch guitar. His first stage performances were with local high school bands in Spartanburg, South Carolina.

After serving in the Navy from 1966 to 1968, he formed a band, The Toy Factory, with his longtime childhood friend, Toy Caldwell. George also performed with another group, Pax Parachute, but his musical talents flourished working with Toy. "Playing guitar with Toy Caldwell wasn't just playing guitar, it was sharing a mind. With me at his side he had the freedom to do whatever came into his mind and I could instinctively interpret whatever that was and experiment with him. And Toy had a heart of gold."

== Later career ==
In 2005 George was a founding member of the Renegades of Southern Rock, an all star band featuring George, Dan Toler, John Townsend, & Jack Hall along with others. George was also a prolific songwriter, penning songs right up to his final days. George wrote songs for John Corbett, Beverley Mitchell, and others.

On August 12th, 2006, George took the stage once again with The Marshall Tucker Band at Starwood Amphitheater for a stellar performance. Soon after The Marshall Tucker Band released "The Next Adventure" which featured three George McCorkle songs: "The Guitar Playing Man", "Jesus Never Had a Motorcycle" and "I Love You That Way", all classic additions to the MTB songbook.

In 2007 George was involved in several projects including the Renegades of Southern Rock. George performed his final performance with friend Candy Coburn on CW Network where he received a standing ovation. George was compiling songs for his next solo album which was to be titled "G=MC2" along with being part of the "Brothers of the Southland" project with Bo Bice, Dan Toler, Steve Gorman, Reese Wynans, and others. Prior to entering the studio for either of these projects, George was rushed to the hospital in Lebanon, Tennessee, where he died of cancer, surrounded by friends and family.

== Jam4George ==
On November 3, 2007, Jam4George was held in Spartanburg, South Carolina. It was an all-day event featuring many of George's musician friends celebrating George's life and music.
