= Jerry Eubanks =

American musician

- Born: March 9, 1950 (age 76); Spartanburg, South Carolina, U.S.
- Genre: Southern rock
- Occupations: Singer, songwriter
- Instruments: Keyboard, saxophone, flute
- Years active: 1960s–2000s
- Formerly of: The Marshall Tucker Band

Jerry Eubanks (born March 9, 1950) is an American musician best known as the original saxophonist, keyboardist and flautist for The Marshall Tucker Band. His flute and sax solos were a signature of the band. Eubanks left the Marshall Tucker Band in 1996, outlasting most of the surviving original members. As of 2005, he was running a company called Flatwoods Soaps, in Spartanburg, SC.

He is the father of retired competitive Call of Duty player and now coach James Eubanks, better known as Clayster.
