= Modern Lovers 88 =

1987 album by Jonathan Richman and the Modern Lovers

- Cover photograph by Andy Paley

Studio album by Jonathan Richman and the Modern Lovers
- Released: November 1987
- Recorded: Three days in autumn 1987
- Studios: The Bennett House, Grass Valley, California
- Genres: Rock and roll; doo-wop
- Length: 29:35
- Label: Rounder
- Producer: Brennan Totten

Jonathan Richman chronology
It's Time For (1986)	Modern Lovers 88 (1987)	Jonathan Richman (1989)

Singles from Modern Lovers 88
- 1. "California Desert Party" / "When Harpo Played His Harp" Released: 1988

Modern Lovers 88 (Note: The album title is sometimes rendered with an apostrophe, as Modern Lovers '88. An apostrophe is not used in the title on the album packaging.) is the seventh and final studio album by American singer-songwriter Jonathan Richman and the Modern Lovers. Recorded and released in late 1987, it became Richman's final recording alongside a backing band credited as the Modern Lovers. After a period of frequent switches from one record company to another, he released Modern Lovers 88 through Rounder Records, where he remained until the mid-1990s.

Running just under half an hour, the album features a new lineup of the Modern Lovers as a trio, with Richman joined by guitarist Brennan Totten and drummer Johnny Avila. Totten also produced the album, his first of several such projects with Richman. The three musicians had toured live together for about a year before recording the album at a studio near Richman's home in Grass Valley, California. With its acoustic instrumentation and spare arrangements, the sound of Modern Lovers 88 reflects Richman's love of early 1960s rock and roll and extreme aversion to loud amplification.

Early reviews were generally positive, but its reputation among rock critics soon stagnated. Record guides often dismissed it as unremarkable, along with most of the rest of Richman's 1980s output. Nonetheless, the album has garnered a cult following and reappraisal from critics who view it as an overlooked highlight of Richman's discography. Win Butler of Arcade Fire called it "a real classic that I never heard of as a classic." For Record Store Day 2022, Craft Recordings reissued the album in a remastered 35th-anniversary edition. Richman scored a late-career debut on the Billboard charts when the reissue pushed Modern Lovers 88 to number 77 on Top Album Sales.

== Background ==
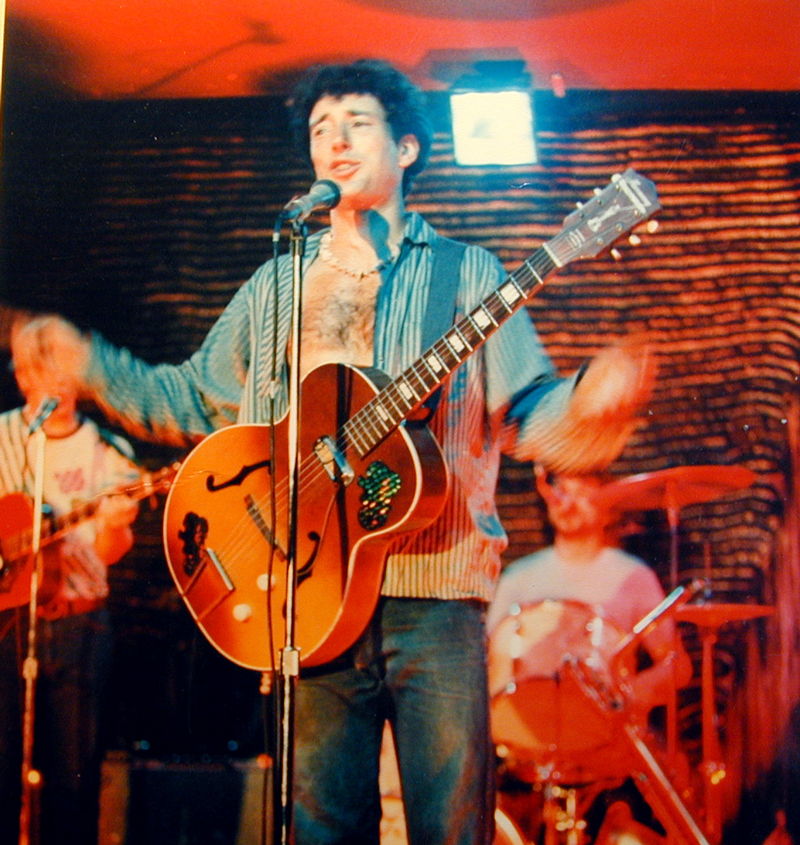
Richman and the Modern Lovers, 1984. Modern Lovers 88 was Richman's final album featuring a backing band before going strictly solo.

Modern Lovers 88 was Richman's final album featuring a backing band credited as "the Modern Lovers", but he had already been touring as a solo artist since 1978. After his 1986 album It's Time for Jonathan Richman and the Modern Lovers, he broke up the third lineup of the Modern Lovers. From that point onward, he preferred to work with a rotating cast of musicians on a more casual, fluid basis, rather than putting together a full backing band as a unit with a stable lineup.

In 1986, Richman began performing live shows accompanied by his recent acquaintance Brennan Totten. A few months after discovering Totten playing in a Northern California blues band, Richman walked into Totten's home one morning, unannounced, singing his song "The UFO Man". When he got to the chorus, Richman exclaimed, "Your turn! You sing!", and Totten—who had been busy feeding his daughter at the time of the interruption—sang along in response, as requested. Richman replied, "Oh, you can sing too," and exited the residence. He asked Totten to join the Modern Lovers a few days later. While touring throughout the United States and Europe in 1986–87, Richman and Totten were joined on a temporary basis by Richman's old friend and frequent collaborator Andy Paley.

By this time in his career, music journalists noted Richman had developed a tendency to switch to a new label on virtually every new album he made. His previous three albums had been distributed in the United States by as many different labels: Sire Records for Jonathan Sings! (1983), Twin/Tone for Rockin' and Romance (1985), and Upside for It's Time for Jonathan Richman and the Modern Lovers (1986). All three labels were associated with new wave music, and all three in turn had marketed Richman as "a nerdy new waver"—each time to little success. For Modern Lovers 88, he would switch labels once again—this time joining Rounder Records, a smaller American label with a niche specialization in folk music. In the United Kingdom, his last two albums had been distributed by Rough Trade. While he enjoyed the creative freedom Rough Trade had afforded him under the enthusiastic personal support of label head Geoff Travis, the company's financial doldrums meant they had done little to promote his music. He ended his relationship with Rough Trade before recording Modern Lovers 88.

== Recording and release ==
Modern Lovers 88 was recorded in the autumn of 1987 in Grass Valley, California, near where Richman lived at the time. The sessions lasted three days. Totten produced the album. (Note: Although no one received credit for the album's production in its liner notes, several sources identify Totten as its producer, including Richman's autobiographical essay "Jonathan Richman's First Twenty Years in Show Business" and the biography There's Something About Jonathan: Jonathan Richman and the Modern Lovers—identify Totten as its producer.) Having practiced extensively on the road, the band took little time for rehearsal before the sessions. Their performances were captured live in the studio, and no overdubbing was done.

Though its release is often dated to 1988, (Note: Discographical reference materials differ as to the album's release year—for example, Trouser Press and the Spin Alternative Record Guide give 1987, while AllMusic and The New Rolling Stone Album Guide give 1988. The copyright notice on the original CD packaging indicates it was first published in 1987. In a review published on November 19, 1987, a critic for The GW Hatchet noted its release was expected "this month", within "about two more weeks". Rounder Records dated the album's release to November 1987 in the liner notes for the label's four-disc compilation, The Rounder Records Story (2010). Other sources, however, suggest a release in early 1988: the album was first listed in the Schwann Catalog in February 1988, and Martin C. Strong's The Essential Rock Discography provides the same month of release; meanwhile, a notice in Billboard announced the album's release on LP and cassette (though not CD) for the week ending March 12, 1988.) Rounder Records issued the album in November 1987. Departing from his previous labels' tendency to lump his records in the "new wave" category, Rounder promoted him as "a quirky folkie", a persona more in line with his musical direction. To promote the album, Rounder issued "California Desert Party" (backed with "When Harpo Played His Harp") as a 7-inch single in Spain and released "Dancin' Late at Night" as a track on The Rounder CD Single, a mini-compilation also featuring recent songs by NRBQ, Têtes Noires, and Barrence Whitfield & the Savages. He would release another seven albums with Rounder before switching to Vapor Records for his 1996 album Surrender to Jonathan. The album was released on Demon Records in the UK and Stony Plain Records in Canada.

Despite being recorded and released in 1987, the album was titled Modern Lovers 88. When asked about the apparent chronological discrepancy, Richman commented: "We figured that would give it a longer shelf life." "If Richman were capable of irony," a critic wrote in Rolling Stone, "the album's title might seem tongue in cheek: the simple chord changes, bare-bones instrumentation and unsophisticated production are as un-up-to-date as any of Richman's works since 1976's hard-edged Modern Lovers." The title may have been intended as an allusion to the song "Rocket 88" (1951), one of the very earliest rock and roll records in history.

=== 2022 reissue ===
Chart (2022)	Peak position
US Top Album Sales	77

By 2007, Modern Lovers 88 and most of Richman's other 1980s albums had been out of print for many years. On April 23, 2022, the label Craft Recordings reissued the album in a 35th-anniversary edition for Record Store Day. It was the latest in a series of reissues from Richman's Rounder Records back catalog. Pressed on sky-blue vinyl in an edition of 7,000 copies, the record was remastered by Kevin Gray using an all-analog process. The re-release sent Modern Lovers 88 to number 77 on Top Album Sales for the week of May 7, 2022, marking Richman's first-ever appearance on any Billboard chart.

== Reception ==
Professional ratings
Contemporaneous reviews (1987–88)
Review scores
Source	Rating
Billboard	"Recommended"
Hi-Fi News & Record Review	B
NME	9/10
Oakland Tribune	3/4 stars
Record-Journal	A
Record Mirror	4/5 marks
Rolling Stone	3/5 stars

Reviews in the American press were generally favorable, though some expressed reservations. For Rolling Stone, David Handelman summed up Richman's preceding mid-1980s output as "spotty, but always with shining moments"; he expressed a similarly mixed reaction to Modern Lovers 88, finding some tracks "honest and winning" while others "wear thin fast". Creem reviewer Craig Zeller wrote that "a lot of these songs do coast on minor melodies and self-borrowings a little too often but—as usual—Jonathan's engaging manner pulls you in." In the Boston Globe, David Emerson likened Richman to "a sincere/silly cross between Wally Cleaver and Pee Wee Herman ... In Richman's world, familiar joys are to be praised and new ones explored. An artist in the process of maturing? Not really. A singer with heart who's not ashamed to still have fun? You bet."

Other American critics were less reserved with their praise. "Happily," wrote Spin's Jim Daly, "Modern Lovers 88 finds Richman firmly back on track. The 11-song album can be compared to a picture drawn by a first-grader, which is then proudly brought home, and admired not for its technical acumen but for its purity of spirit." David Okamoto of the St. Petersburg Times compared it to "a sloppy finger-painting, where technique comes in second to the feelings being expressed", and said an open-minded listener would "discover that Modern Lovers 88 is just a warm, fun throwback to a simpler time, when music was nothing but a form of personal expression." Jim Zebora of the Record-Journal said the album showed Richman to be "one of rock's wonders" and highlighted the immediacy of his vocal performance, writing that "he's got guts to be so far out in front, unprotected by anything but his sincerity." In the Austin American-Statesman, James Nold Jr. praised Modern Lovers 88 for encapsulating what he saw as Richman's finest qualities as a performer and songwriter, which he felt overcame flaws like a lack of ambition or propensity for childishness:

Sometimes, Richman has sounded too self-consciously cute; worse, he's sometimes appeared to be forcing his magic. I suspect Richman knows this, but disregards it. ... And while I wish he were challenging himself more (cover "Gimme Shelter"!), he's right. As time goes on, it's depressing how few songs seem to come out of the spirit that inspired "Eight Days a Week" or "Do You Believe in Magic". By and large, rock isn't convincing as happy music anymore. For all its shortcomings, Richman's music is.

... If you've never heard Richman before, [Modern Lovers 88] gives you a good sense of what he's about, his joyous spirit, his bad jokes, his willingness to be goofy on behalf of the things he believes. ... "If someone else could do it / How could nobody does?" Richman asks [on "When Harpo Played His Harp"]. Same goes for you, Jonathan.

Critical consensus among reviewers in the British press was also complimentary. Writing for Record Mirror, Ian Dickson said Richman "still hasn't grown up and, having grooved along to Modern Lovers 88, I hope he never will", while also claiming the songs to be "a lot more astute than you might imagine" in light of their sometimes juvenile subject matter. NME's Len Brown detected "an original spring in his steps, a daft charm in his innocence" that he compared favorably to the late 1970s Modern Lovers lineup, and wrote, "There's something reassuring about Jonathan's prolonged adolescence, something we can all depend on; if he ever grew up it would be as disturbing as Morrissey taking up wind-surfing. For while the world gets older and uglier Jo-Jo gets simpler 'n' sweeter, younger all the time." Pete Clark at Hi-Fi News & Record Review wrote that "88 sees Richman further refining his muse, casting aside some of his more icky anthropomorphisms and descending still further into deep joy ... If there's a child in you waiting to get out, here's the 24-hour pass." A print advertisement for the album, run by Demon Records, quoted further plaudits published in City Limits and Melody Maker.

=== Retrospective appraisal ===
Retrospective professional ratings
Review scores
Source	Rating
AllMusic	3/5 stars
The Encyclopedia of Popular Music	3/5 stars
MusicHound Rock	2.5/5 stars
The Rolling Stone Album Guide	(1992) (2004)
Spin Alternative Record Guide	5/10

In record guides of 1990s and 2000s, rock critics often dismissed Modern Lovers 88 as just another album in a mid-career slump for Richman. The album received middling scores in The Rolling Stone Album Guide, the Spin Alternative Record Guide, and MusicHound Rock: The Essential Album Guide. Critics usually lumped it alongside his other 1980s records, which were glossed as lackluster, dated in style, or too eccentric for the uninitiated listener. None of the aforementioned guides differentiated the album from any of his other 1980s records, with the exception of the third edition of the Rolling Stone Album Guide, which dubiously noted the album's reputation as a comeback among Richman's cult following. Rock critic Robert Christgau omitted the album altogether from his Record Guide: The '80s.

By contrast, AllMusic's Richie Unterberger deemed the album "one of his better '80s efforts," praising its stripped-down "summertime campfire feel" and singling out "I Love Hot Nights", "California Desert Party", and "Gail Loves Me" among the "best uptempo tunes" in Richman's catalog. In the New Trouser Press Record Guide, Ira Robbins praised it as a "magical" and "all-too-brief set" with songs that "convert the essential ingredients of '50s R&B into airy but exciting dance-rock as only the Modern Lovers can." Modern Lovers 88 received a highly favorable reassessment in the anthology Lost in the Grooves: Scram's Capricious Guide to the Music You Missed by critic Jacqueline Zahas, who said the album had become "stranded in his long catalog" but "reminds us that Jonathan's not just sweetness and whimsy, but a visionary, stubbornly working out his own unique brand of rock and roll." The editors of the Scram anthology went further, calling for a broad reappraisal of Richman's solo efforts from the period:

Deep catalogs that resist easy summary create their own problems. The book on Jonathan Richman says: proto-punk innovator with the Modern Lovers and faux-naïf kiddie songster thereafter. But that book's wrong. The kid songs were only a brief transitional period to stake out a new sound and songwriting territory that had a huge influence on the nineties indie lo-fi scene. We review Modern Lovers 88 in this book, but could have just as easily highlighted Rock 'n' Roll with the Modern Lovers or Rockin' and Romance or I, Jonathan, each stellar, distinct, and scattered across his career.

British music critic Alexis Petridis later referred to Modern Lovers 88 as one of the records from Richman's "80s purple patch". In 2018, NME included the album on a list of "100 cult albums to hear before you die" with a blurb written by Win Butler of Arcade Fire, who praised Richman's lyricism on songs such as "I Love Hot Nights".

== Track listing ==
All tracks are written by Jonathan Richman, except for track 11.

Side A
No.	Title	Length
1.	"Dancin' Late at Night"	3:27
2.	"When Harpo Played His Harp"	2:33
3.	"Gail Loves Me"	2:45
4.	"New Kind of Neighborhood"	2:41
5.	"African Lady"	2:32

Side B
No.	Title	Music	Length
6.	"I Love Hot Nights"		2:57
7.	"California Desert Party"		2:08
8.	"Everything's Gotta Be Right"		2:47
9.	"Circle I"		2:33
10.	"I Have Come Out to Play"		3:45
11.	"The Theme from Moulin Rouge"	Georges Auric	1:27
Total length:			29:35

== Personnel ==
Adapted from the original CD packaging, except where otherwise noted.

Jonathan Richman and the Modern Lovers

- Jonathan Richman – lead vocals, guitar, saxophone
- Brennan Totten – backing vocals, guitar, production
- Johnny Avila – backing vocals, "drum" (Note: Specifically, Avila's singular "drum" was a tom.)

Others

- Paul Emery – engineer
- Andy Paley – color photography
- Barbara McHugh – black-and-white photography
- Joanna Bodenweber – design

2022 reissue

- Kevin Gray – mastering engineer

== Sources ==
- Anon. (n.d.). "Jonathan Richman & the Modern Lovers – California Desert Party (Song)". SpanishCharts.com. Hung Medien. Archived from the original on July 16, 2022.
- Andler, David L. (November 19, 1987). "Richman warm, friendly in '88". The GW Hatchet. Vol. 84, no. 24. Washington, D.C.: Hatchet Publications, Inc. p. A15 – via the Internet Archive.
- Bessman, Jim (July 27, 1996). "Jonathan Richman Issues His 'Surrender' on Vapor". Billboard. pp. 10–11. Archived from the original on July 10, 2022.
- Billboard staff (March 12, 1988). "Album Releases" (PDF). Billboard. Vol. 100, no. 11. p. 51. Archived (PDF) from the original on July 10, 2022 – via WorldRadioHistory.com.
- Billboard staff (n.d.). "Jonathan Richman & The Modern Lovers – Chart History". Billboard. Archived from the original on July 14, 2022.
- Blackham, Richard; Crapo, Paul; Hart, Jane Poirier, eds. (Summer 1988). "Schwann: The World's Most Consulted Record and Tape Guide". Schwann Catalog. 40 (3). New York: ABC Consumer Magazines, Inc. ISBN 0-911656-23-5 – via the Internet Archive (registration required).
- Brown, Len (January 30, 1988). "Boy's Own Adventure". NME. London. p. 83.
- Christgau, Robert (1990). Christgau's Record Guide: The '80s. New York: Pantheon Books. ISBN 0-679-73015-X – via the Internet Archive (registration required).
- Clark, Pete (April 1988). "Jonathan Richman and the Modern Lovers: Modern Lovers 88 Demon Fiend 106" (PDF). Hi-Fi News & Record Review. 33 (4): 113. Archived (PDF) from the original on March 29, 2022 – via WorldRadioHistory.com.
- Coleman, Mark (1992). "Jonathan Richman". In DeCurtis, Anthony; Henke, James; George-Warren, Holly (eds.). The Rolling Stone Album Guide (3rd ed.). New York: Random House. pp. 589–590. ISBN 0-679-73729-4.
- Cooper, Kim; Smay, David, eds. (2005). Lost in the Grooves: Scram's Capricious Guide to the Music You Missed. New York: Routledge. doi:10.4324/9780203997024. ISBN 0-415-96998-0.
- Daly, Jim (January 1988). "Platter du Jour – Jonathan Richman and the Modern Lovers – Modern Lovers 88 – Rounder". Spin. Vol. 3, no. 8. pp. 23–24 – via the Internet Archive.
- Demon Records (January 30, 1988). "Modern Lovers 88 [advertisement]" (PDF). Music Week. London: Spotlight Publications Ltd. p. 6. Archived (PDF) from the original on July 18, 2022.
- Dickson, Ian (January 23, 1988). "Jonathan Richman and the Modern Lovers 'Modern Lovers 88' (Demon FIEND 106)" (PDF). Record Mirror. 33 (4). London: Spotlight Publications Ltd.: 14. Archived (PDF) from the original on September 6, 2021 – via WorldRadioHistory.com.
- Emerson, David (April 21, 1988). "Jonathan Richman and the Modern Lovers – Modern Lovers '88 – Rounder". Calendar. The Boston Globe. Vol. 13, no. 31. p. 6 – via Newspapers.com.
- Gorin, François (September 2, 2017). "Jonathan Richman (8), Harpo et l'ange du bizarre" [Jonathan Richman (8), Harpo and the Angel of the Weird]. Télérama (in French). Archived from the original on February 9, 2017.
- Hack, Greg (November 12, 1988). "Crazed guitar player relies more on ballads on third disc". Kansas City Times. Kansas City, Missouri. p. F-2 – via Newspapers.com.
- Handelman, David (March 10, 1988). "Modern Lovers 88". Rolling Stone. No. 521. pp. 92–93. Archived from the original on May 9, 2006.
- Harrison, Tom (May 1, 1988). "It's a timely reminder". The Province. Vancouver. p. 81 – via Newspapers.com.
- Hart, Ron (April 21, 2022). "Record Store Day Returns: RSD 2022 Releases Worth Digging For" (PDF). Billboard Bulletin. Billboard Inc. pp. 24–25. Archived (PDF) from the original on June 26, 2022.
- Hasan, Ghizal (Fall 1992). "Radio On! The Confessions of a Modern Lover" (PDF). Fall 1992 Program Guide (PDF). Irvine, California: KUCI. pp. 7, 15. Archived (PDF) from the original on June 30, 2022.
- Ham, Robert (April 22, 2022). "Record Time: New & Notable Vinyl Releases – Record Store Day 2022 Edition". Paste. Atlanta: Paste Media Group. Archived from the original on April 22, 2022.
- Himes, Geoffrey (2010). "The Rounder Records Story: An Introduction". The Rounder Records Story (PDF) (CD booklet liner notes). Various artists. Cambridge, Massachusetts: Rounder Records. pp. 1–96. Rounder 11661-3295-2 – via the Internet Archive.
- Hochman, Steve (2004). "Jonathan Richman". In Brackett, Nathan; Hoard, Christian (eds.). The New Rolling Stone Album Guide (4th ed.). New York: Simon & Schuster. pp. 690–691. ISBN 0-7432-0169-8 – via the Internet Archive.
- Kelp, Larry (January 17, 1988). "Recordings". Oakland Tribune. p. 8 – via Newspapers.com.
- Larkin, Colin, ed. (November 1998). "Modern Lovers". The Encyclopedia of Popular Music. Vol. V (3rd ed.). London: Muze UK Ltd. pp. 3726–3727. ISBN 0-333-74134-X – via the Internet Archive.
- McTavish, Brian (March 27, 1987). "A fountain of youth – Jonathan Richman just delights in fresh and refreshing images". Star Preview. The Kansas City Star. Capital Cities/ABC. p. 10 – via Newspapers.com.
- Mitchell, Tim (1999). There's Something About Jonathan: Jonathan Richman and the Modern Lovers. London: Peter Owen Publishers. ISBN 0-7206-1076-1 – via the Internet Archive (registration required).
- NME staff (August 30, 2018). "100 cult albums to hear before you die, chosen by your favourite rockstars". NME. London. Archived from the original on May 11, 2022.
- Nold, James Jr. (April 9, 1988). "'Modern Lovers 88' Jonathan Richman and the Modern Lovers (Rounder)". Scene. The Courier-Journal. Louisville, Kentucky: Gannett. p. 10 – via Newspapers.com.
- Okamoto, David (January 17, 1988). "Quirky but fun tunes come from Jonathan Richman". Floridian Arts. St. Petersburg Times. p. 2F. ProQuest 262552846 – via Newspapers.com.
- Okamoto, David (1999). "Jonathan Richman/Jonathan Richman & the Modern Lovers". In Graff, Gary; Durchholz, Daniel (eds.). MusicHound Rock: The Essential Album Guide (2nd ed.). Farmington Hills, Michigan: Gale Research. pp. 941–942. ISBN 1-57859-061-2 – via the Internet Archive (registration required).
- Petridis, Alexis (July 20, 2007). "How to buy Jonathan Richman". The Guardian. Archived from the original on October 5, 2014.
- Richman, Jonathan (1989). "Jonathan Richman's First Twenty Years in Show Business" (Press release). Cambridge, Massachusetts: Rounder Records. "Brennan Totten, my producer, did Modern Lovers '88 and Jonathan Richman. These are my two favorites of all my records and I like the newer one best of these two. Great as me and Paley get along, Brennan gets me the sound exactly. I love working with him. ... My last band. My last version of Jonathan Richman and the Modern Lovers was one terrific band. We were a trio: Me, Brennan on guitar, and Johnny Avila on drums. David Robinson saw us in New York and said, 'Best back-up vocals ever!' and I agree. Beth and Ellie were more beautiful singers but I couldn't harmonize with them. These guys had the perfect range and sounds for me. Curly saw us and said flat out that this trio was the best band of any of 'em. Some bands may have grooved more—tho' I can't think of any—but none played and sang better."
- Richman, Jonathan and the Modern Lovers (1987). Modern Lovers 88 (PDF) (CD booklet and packaging). Cambridge, Massachusetts: Rounder Records. Rounder 9014 – via the Internet Archive.
- Robbins, Ira A. (1989). "Jonathan Richman and the Modern Lovers / Modern Lovers". In Robbins, Ira A. (ed.). The New Trouser Press Record Guide (3rd ed.). New York: Collier Books. pp. 477–479. ISBN 0-02-036370-2 – via the Internet Archive (registration required).
- Rosenbluth, Jean, ed. (February 6, 1988). "Album Reviews" (PDF). Billboard. Vol. 100, no. 6. p. 68. Archived (PDF) from the original on January 22, 2021 – via WorldRadioHistory.com.
- Sheffield, Rob (1995). "Modern Lovers and Jonathan Richman". In Weisbard, Eric; Marks, Craig (eds.). Spin Alternative Record Guide. Vintage Books. pp. 257–258. ISBN 0-679-75574-8.
- Shepard, Eric (July 7, 1988). "A smorgasbord of sound". Rockland Weekend. The Journal-News. Rockland County, New York: Gannett. pp. 10–11 – via Newspapers.com.
- Strong, Martin C. (2006). "Jonathan Richman". The Essential Rock Discography. Edinburgh: Canongate. pp. 918–920. ISBN 1-84195-860-3 – via the Internet Archive (registration required).
- Tobler, John, ed. (1991). "Jonathan Richman / The Modern Lovers". Who's Who in Rock & Roll. London: Hamlyn. p. 264. ISBN 0-600-574164 – via the Internet Archive (registration required).
- Totten, Brennan (2002). "Notes". Action Packed: The Best of Jonathan Richman (PDF) (liner notes essay). Jonathan Richman. Cambridge, Massachusetts: Rounder Records. Rounder 1166-11596-2 – via the Internet Archive.
- Unterberger, Richie (n.d.). "Modern Lovers '88". AllMusic. All Media Network. Archived from the original on June 27, 2022.
- White, Ian (February 17, 2022). "Craft Recordings Announces New Titles for Record Store Day 2022". eCoustics. Laguna Beach, California. Archived from the original on February 23, 2022.
- Zebora, Jim (March 13, 1988). "No-hype rocker shows his riches". Accent [Section E]. Record-Journal. Meriden, Connecticut. p. E-2 – via Newspapers.com.
- Zeller, Craig (July 1988). "Jonathan Richman & the Modern Lovers – Modern Lovers 88 (Rounder)". Rock-a-Rama. Creem. Vol. 19, no. 10. p. 30 – via the Internet Archive.
