= Jonathan Richman =

American singer-songwriter and guitarist (born 1951)

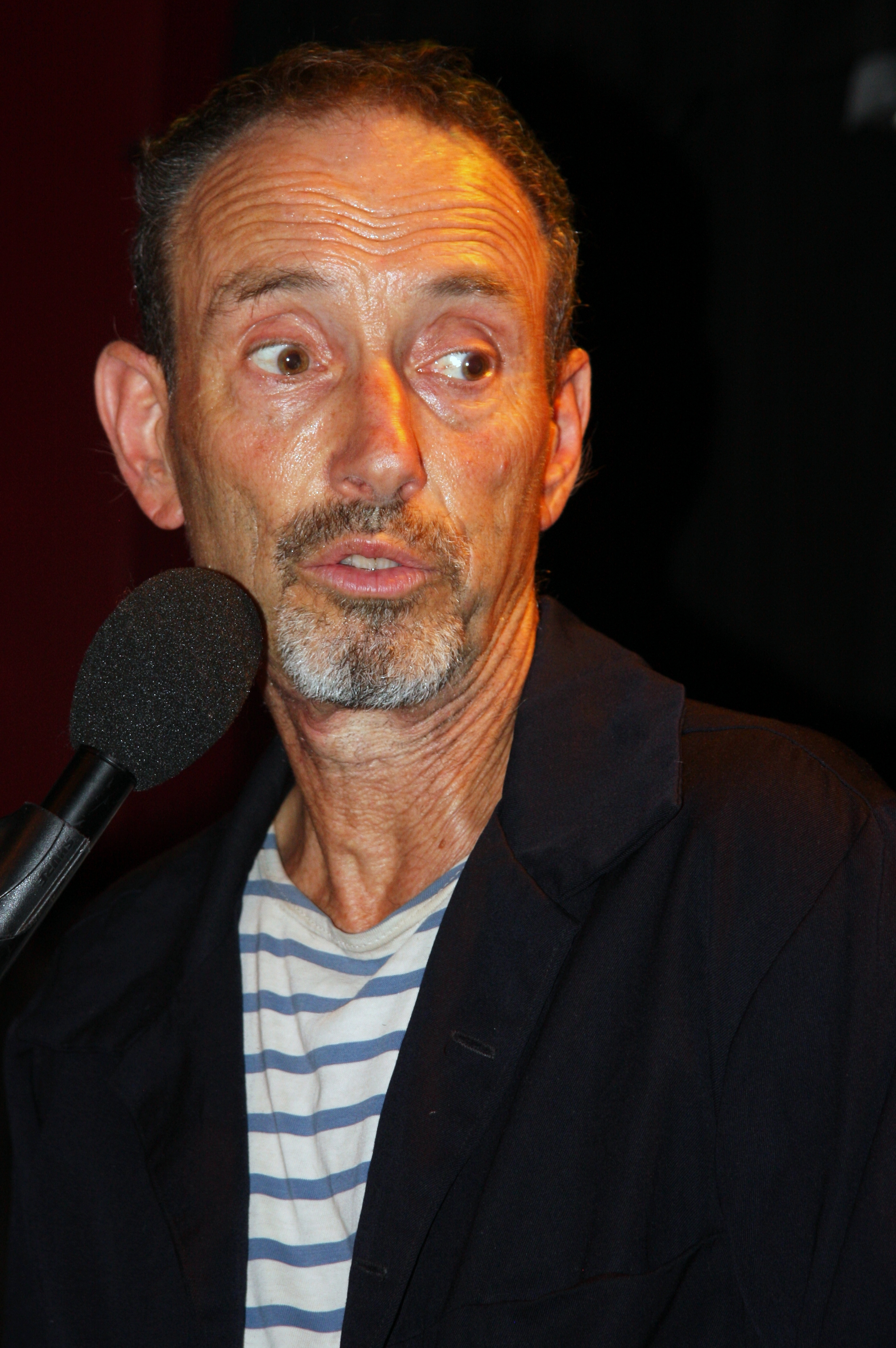
- Richman in 2014

Background information
- Born: Jonathan Michael Richman; May 16, 1951 (age 75); Boston, Massachusetts, U.S.
- Genres: Folk; proto-punk; garage rock
- Occupations: Singer; songwriter; musician
- Instruments: Vocals; guitar; saxophone
- Years active: 1970–present
- Labels: Beserkley; Rounder; United Artists; Twin Tone; Upside; Rough Trade; Warner Bros.; Vapor; Blue Arrow
- Formerly of: The Modern Lovers

Jonathan Michael Richman (born May 16, 1951) is an American singer, songwriter and guitarist. In 1970, he founded the Modern Lovers, an influential proto-punk band. Since the mid-1970s, Richman has worked either solo or with low-key acoustic and electric backing. He is known for his wide-eyed, unaffected, and childlike outlook, and music that, while rooted in rock and roll, is influenced by music from around the world.

== Biography ==
=== Early life ===
Richman was born on May 16, 1951, into a Jewish family in Boston, and raised in the suburb of Natick. Richman began playing music and writing his own songs in the mid-1960s. He became infatuated with the Velvet Underground and, in 1969, he moved to New York City, lived on the couch of their manager, Steve Sesnick, worked odd jobs, and tried to break in as a professional musician. Failing at this, he returned to Boston.

=== The Modern Lovers ===
When I was a teenager, I thought I would be a painter, and then sound overtook me. I made up songs because I had to. I had the need to express how I felt. And that's still how it is. It's just what I do. I do it when there's no audience, I do it when there is an audience. And, when I paint, that's how that is too.

— Richman in a 2020 online thread

Richman formed the Modern Lovers, a proto-punk garage rock band, in Boston, Massachusetts. Other notable members of the group were keyboard player Jerry Harrison and drummer David Robinson, who later joined Talking Heads and the Cars, respectively.

In 1972, they recorded a series of demos with producer John Cale (formerly of the Velvet Underground). Among these songs were the seminal "Roadrunner" and "Pablo Picasso", which eventually formed the core of the LP The Modern Lovers, released two years after the group had disbanded. The album was strange for its time, featuring Velvets-influenced basic three-chord rock ("Roadrunner" – based on just two chords – is an homage to "Sister Ray") at a time when glam and progressive rock were the norm.

Later in 1972, the group re-recorded some songs, along with other material, with producer Kim Fowley. These demos were eventually released in 1981 as The Original Modern Lovers LP. Despite playing live regularly, the Modern Lovers had a difficult time securing a recording contract. By late 1973, Richman wanted to scrap the recorded tracks and start again with a mellower, more lyrical sound, influenced by the laid-back local music he had heard when the band had a residency at the Inverurie Hotel in Bermuda earlier in the year. These stymied efforts to complete a debut album led to the breakup of the original Modern Lovers in February 1974.

=== Jonathan Richman and the Modern Lovers ===
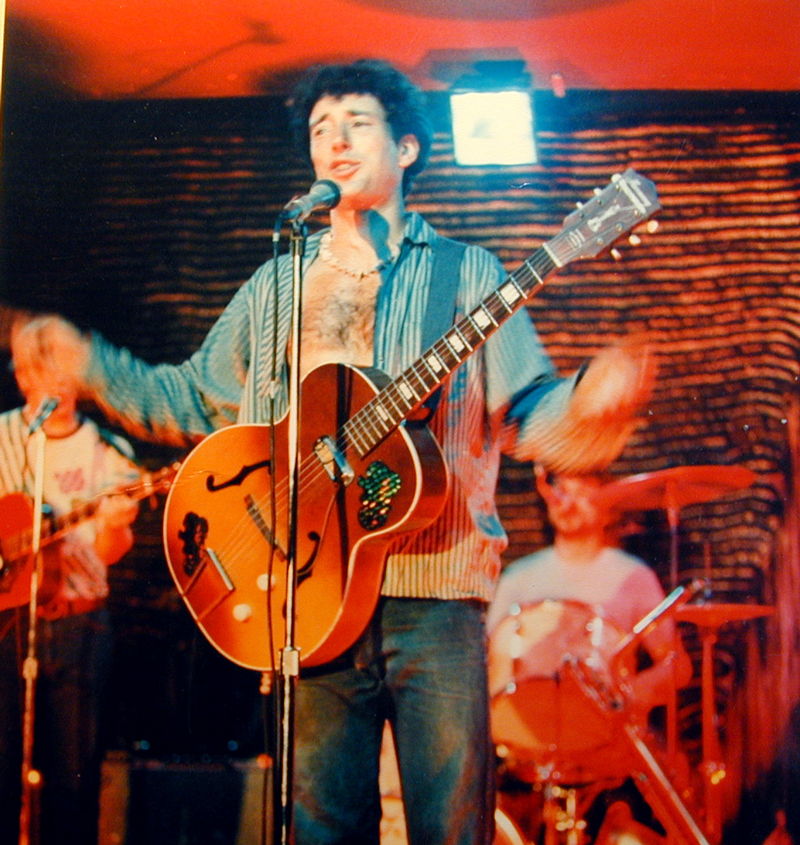
Richman performing with The Modern Lovers in 1984.

In 1975, Richman moved to California to record as a solo singer-songwriter with the independent Beserkley Records label. His first released recordings appeared on 1975's Beserkley Chartbusters compilation, where he was backed by members of Earth Quake and the Rubinoos. The four songs on the compilation also appeared on singles released by Beserkley.

In January 1976, Richman put together a new version of the Modern Lovers, which included original Modern Lovers drummer David Robinson, former Rubinoos bassist Greg 'Curly' Keranen and Leroy Radcliffe on guitar. The new group, now billed as Jonathan Richman and The Modern Lovers, found Richman turning away from the harder, Velvet Underground-influenced electric rock of the original Modern Lovers, toward a gentler sound mixing pop with 1950s rock and roll, and including a bigger emphasis on harmony vocals. During this period Richman recorded a mix of original songs and material by other writers, including Chuck Berry's "Back in the USA", the traditional spiritual songs "Amazing Grace" and "Angels Watching Over Me", and older pop songs like "Emaline", "Buzz, Buzz, Buzz", and "Lydia".

Richman's own songs continued to mix straightforward love themes with more whimsical themes like Martians ("Here Come the Martian Martians"), Leprechauns ("Rockin' Rockin' Leprechauns"), the Abominable Snowman ("Abominable Snowman in the Market"), and mosquitoes ("I'm Nature's Mosquito"). Richman's 1977 recording of the children's music standard "The Wheels on the Bus" made explicit his interest in making music for listeners of all ages.

The album Jonathan Richman and the Modern Lovers was released in May 1976, three months before the older The Modern Lovers sessions were finally released. Drummer David Robinson left the group soon thereafter, due to frustration with Richman's quest for lower volume levels, and joined with Ric Ocasek in forming the band the Cars.

After several months as a trio, Richman found a new drummer, D. Sharpe, an avant-garde jazz player on the Boston scene, who later went on to become a member of pianist Carla Bley's band.

Rock 'n' Roll with the Modern Lovers was released in 1977 and, just as this record began to climb the charts in Europe, Keranen left the group to attend college. A subsequent live album, Modern Lovers Live, was released in 1978, with Asa Brebner on bass.

In the United Kingdom, Richman was recognized as a progenitor of the punk rock scene, and several of his singles became hits. "Roadrunner" reached number 11 in the UK Singles Chart, and its follow-up, the instrumental "Egyptian Reggae", made number 5 in late 1977. "Egyptian Reggae" was a version of Jamaican musician Earl Zero's reggae song None Shall Escape the Judgement; Zero was credited as co-writer on Richman's later versions of the track.

Back in Your Life was released in 1979 under the "Jonathan Richman and the Modern Lovers" moniker, but only about half the disc featured a backup band. The balance of the album was Richman playing solo. Following this version of The Modern Lovers' final breakup, Richman went on sabbatical for a few years, staying in Appleton, Maine, and playing at local bars in Belfast, Maine.

By 1981, Richman was recording and touring once again with various combinations of musicians under the band name Jonathan Richman and the Modern Lovers. The touring band was as large as five backup musicians during parts of 1981, when the group had bassist Curly Keranen once again, along with drummer Michael Guardabascio, keyboard player Ken Forfia, vocalist and guitarist Ellie Marshall, and vocalist Beth Harrington for a gig at New York's Bottom Line. This expanded Modern Lovers group would go on to record much of the music on the Jonathan Sings (1983), Rockin' & Romance (1985), and It's Time For (1986) albums.

From 1981 to 1984, Richman most often played live in a trio with Keranen and Marshall. In 1985, the group was reconfigured, and consisted of bassist Asa Brebner and drummer Andy Paley. From 1986 to 1988, most of Richman's concerts were played with guitarist Brennan Totten and drummer Johnny Avila. Signing with Rounder Records in 1987, Richman recorded his final album using the "Modern Lovers" group name (Modern Lovers 88). After this, the "Modern Lovers" moniker was retired.

=== Solo ===
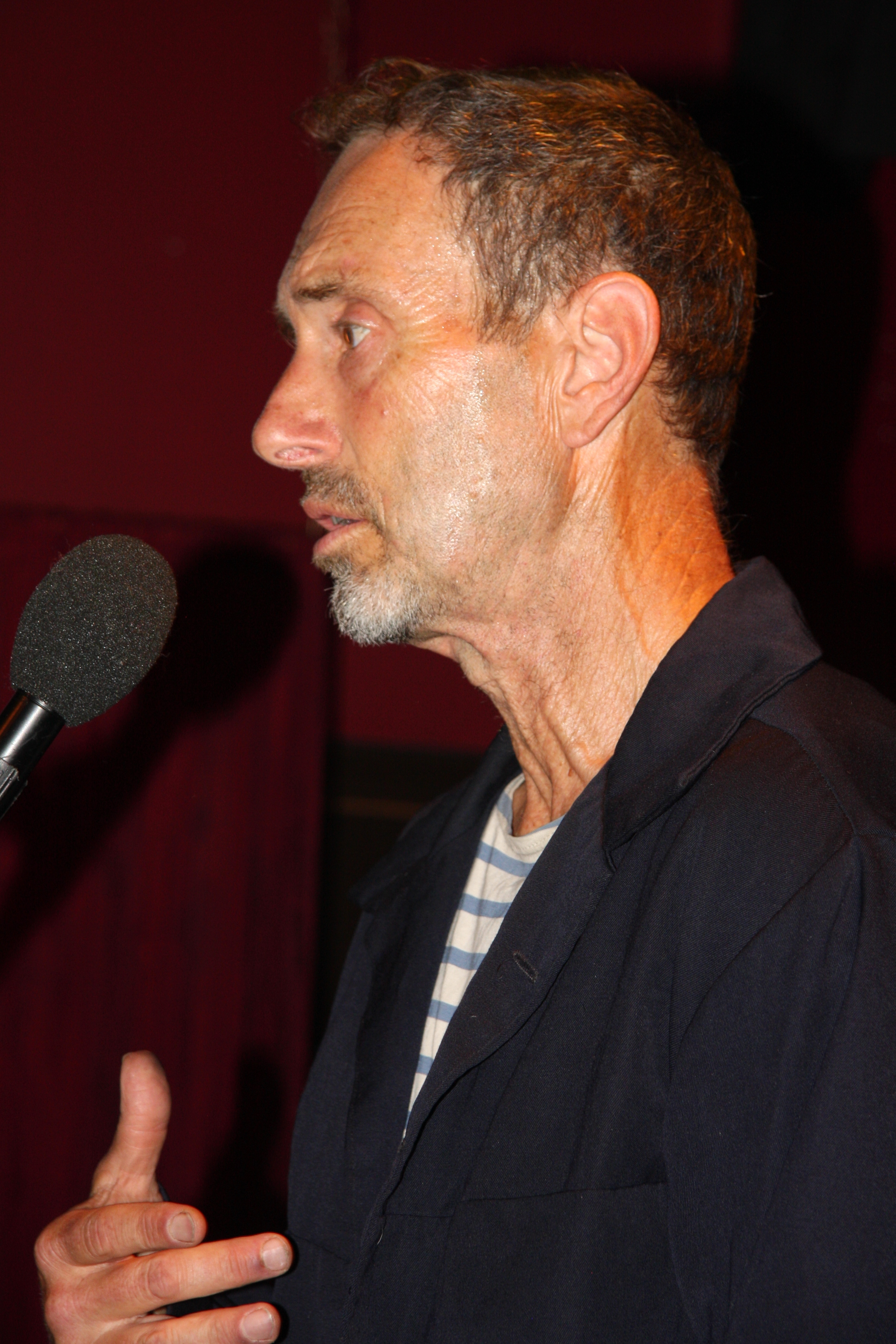
Richman singing solo in 2014.

From 1988 to 1992, Richman performed mostly as a solo act to support his Rounder albums Jonathan Richman (1989), Jonathan Goes Country (1990), and Having a Party with Jonathan Richman (1991). Around the time of his I, Jonathan album (1992), he formed his performance duo with drummer Tommy Larkins (Giant Sand, Yard Trauma, Naked Prey, et al.), who would continue to play and record with Richman for more than 30 years.

In 1993, he contributed the track "Hot Nights" to the AIDS-benefit album No Alternative produced by the Red Hot Organization.

Always possessing an ardent cult following, Richman became better known in the 1990s thanks to a series of appearances on Late Night with Conan O'Brien. Another career boost came with the Farrelly Brothers' 1998 film There's Something About Mary, where Richman and Larkins served as a two-man Greek chorus, commenting on the plot while performing their music within the framed action itself. He also appeared briefly in a bar scene in a previous Farrelly Brothers film, Kingpin, and performed the song "As We Walk to Fenway Park" for their 2005 comedy, Fever Pitch.

Richman continued to release albums throughout the 1990s and 2000s, with the Spanish-language ¡Jonathan, Te Vas a Emocionar! (1994), followed by You Must Ask the Heart (1995), Surrender to Jonathan! (1996), I'm So Confused (1998), Her Mystery Not of High Heels and Eye Shadow (2001), and Not So Much to Be Loved as to Love (2004). In 1998, a live album of Modern Lovers recordings from the early 1970s was released, Live at the Long Branch & More. A live filmed performance, Take Me to the Plaza, was released on DVD in 2002. Revolution Summer, a soundtrack album to a film of the same name, was released in 2007. Finally there were two more albums: Because Her Beauty Is Raw and Wild (2008) and O Moon, Queen Of Night On Earth (2010).

Richman's most recent albums are on the Cleveland, Ohio based Blue Arrow Records: 2016's Ishkode! Ishkode!, 2018's SA, 2021's Want to Visit My Inner House?, and 2025's Only Frozen Sky Anyway.

=== Personal life ===
His first marriage was to Gail Clook of Vermont, in 1982, with whom he has a daughter, Jenny Rae, and stepson, Jason (Gail's son from a previous relationship). This marriage ended in divorce sometime shortly before the release of Surrender to Jonathan! (1996).

In 2003, Richman married Nicole Montalbano of Chico, California. She contributed backing vocals to the album Not So Much to Be Loved as to Love (2004).

Richman also runs a business, Arcane Masonry, in Chico, making bread ovens as well as other projects.

== Artistry and instruments ==
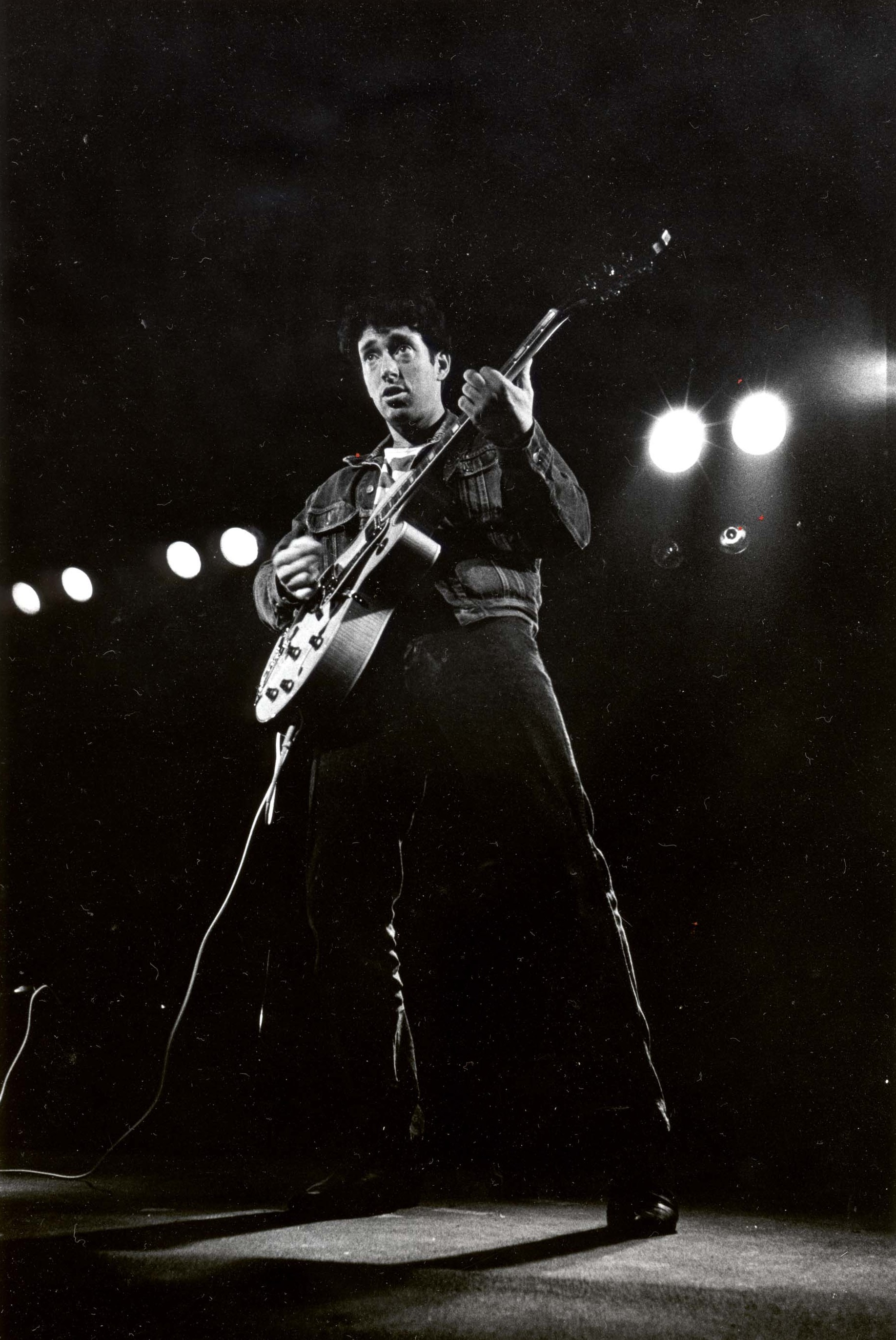
Jonathan Richman in 1990 playing an Epiphone Regent

Richman's minimalist songwriting style has been described as whimsical and childlike. He himself has stated, "I don't write, really. I just make up songs."

Richman has played a variety of electric and acoustic guitars throughout his career. In promotional and concert photos from the early 1970s (such as those reproduced in the album Precise Modern Lovers Order), Richman is frequently seen using a white Fender Stratocaster. He later wrote a song ("Fender Stratocaster") expressing his affection for the Stratocaster design.

In the late 1970s, working with his group The Modern Lovers, Richman often played a Fender Jazzmaster. He can be seen playing this guitar in the Dutch TV program TopPop filmed on September 16, 1978. A contemporaneous stage photo used on the cover of the "Egyptian Reggae" single shows Richman playing a sunburst Stratocaster.

Late-1970s studio recordings, such as the Rock and Roll with the Modern Lovers album, also featured Richman playing nylon-stringed acoustic guitar. On a 1979 performance on French television, and in the cover photo of The Best of Jonathan Richman and The Modern Lovers, Richman plays a late-1970s Ibanez model 2453CW hollow-body electric guitar, a guitar similar in style to the Epiphone he would use extensively a decade later.

In the early- and mid-1980s, working with The Modern Lovers, Richman was frequently photographed playing a Harmony Hollywood hollow-body electric guitar. This guitar is seen on the back cover of Richman's It's Time For album. By the late 1980s, Richman was frequently performing solo concerts using a blonde 1980s Epiphone Regent hollow-body electric guitar. He can be seen holding this guitar on the back cover of the Having a Party with Jonathan Richman CD.

Richman was still using his Epiphone Regent on stage when he began performing as a duo with drummer Tommy Larkins in 1992. After a short stint playing other electric guitars on stage including a Gibson SG, Richman switched to exclusively playing nylon-stringed acoustic guitars (of the classical and flamenco styles) in concert. Richman has played a number of different nylon-stringed guitars since the mid-1990s.

After switching to nylon-stringed acoustic guitars, Richman initially used a pick and played in a style close to that of his electric guitar playing. Eventually, he stopped using both a guitar pick and a guitar strap in concert, preferring to play only with his fingers and to move frequently between playing guitar, dancing, and playing percussion instruments.

Richman has also been photographed playing a Fender Telecaster and other electric and acoustic guitars, and he does not consider any specific instrument to be essential to his sound. In a 2006 interview with musician Chuck Prophet, Richman said "It's not the guitar, it's the player. In fact, my most recent Flamenco guitar isn't even a real Flamenco guitar. It's not made out of the right woods. Made out of walnut. It's twangy. I bought it and I like it."

During the early- and mid-1980s, Richman frequently played tenor saxophone during his concerts with The Modern Lovers. He can be heard playing the instrument on "California Desert Party", a song on his Modern Lovers 88 album. The album also shows him holding the instrument in the cover photograph.

== Influence ==
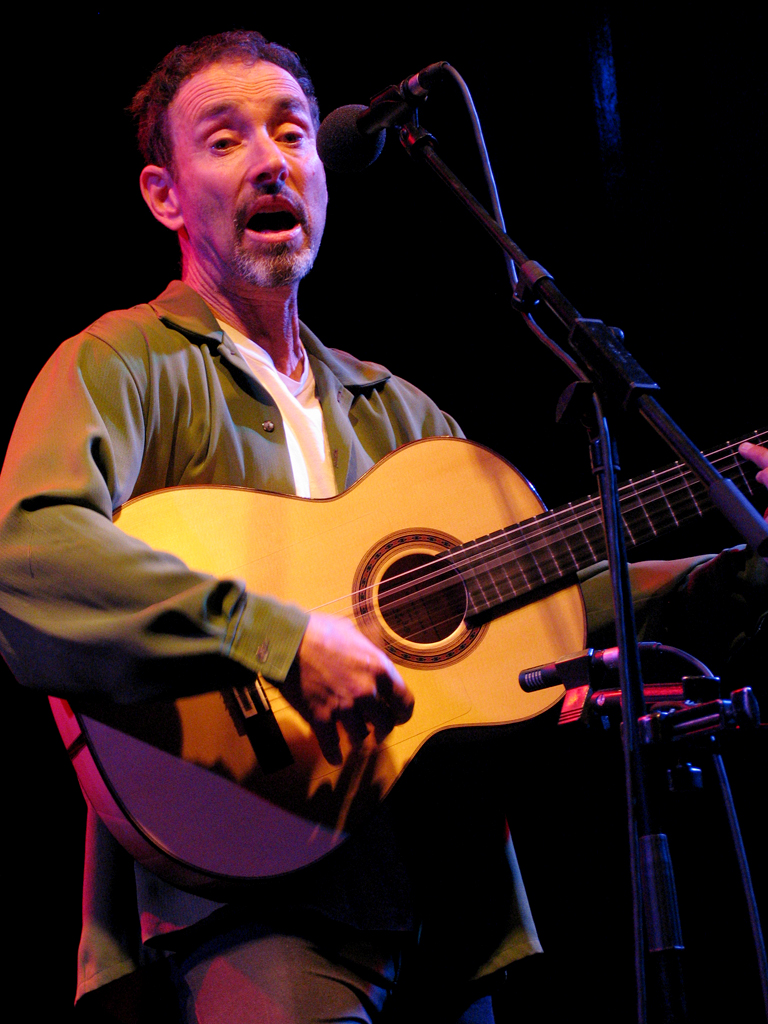
Richman in Barcelona, 2009

Richman's work with the first incarnation of Modern Lovers is a major influence on punk rock. One critic called him the "Godfather of Punk". On his second solo album, Brian Eno made mention of Richman's band in his lyrics, and the Sex Pistols and Joan Jett were among the first artists of note to cover the song "Roadrunner" in the 1970s. A version of "Pablo Picasso" performed by Burning Sensations was included in the 1984 cult film, Repo Man. David Bowie covered "Pablo Picasso" on his album Reality. Velvet Underground founding member John Cale has a version of the song on his 1975 album, Helen of Troy, and continues to include the song in his live shows. Iggy Pop has performed "Pablo Picasso" live and wrote an extra verse for it. Echo and the Bunnymen covered "She Cracked" in concert in 1984 and 1985 and Siouxsie and the Banshees have a version of the song on Downside Up. Darren Hayman and David Tattersall released a cover of "Since She Started to Ride" in 2026 as a bonus to the Hayman, Watkins, Trout and Lee album.

Richman's music has set the tone for many alternative rock bands, such as Violent Femmes, Galaxie 500, They Might Be Giants ("Roadrunner" reportedly inspired John Flansburgh to become a musician), Weezer, Tullycraft, Jens Lekman, Pixies leader Black Francis aka Frank Black (who composed the tribute song "The Man Who Was Too Loud"), Brandon Flowers, Art Brut, Craig Finn of the Hold Steady & Lifter Puller, Mac DeMarco and Nerf Herder who composed a song about him, titled "Jonathan", which appeared on the band's second album How To Meet Girls. British country rock band the Rockingbirds released the single "Jonathan, Jonathan" in tribute to Richman in 1992. The Silos also covered the Modern Lovers' "I'm Straight". Boston ska-punk band Big D and the Kids Table also covered Richman's song "New England" for their Gypsy Hill EP. A tribute album, If I Were a Richman: a Tribute to the Music of Jonathan Richman, was released by Wampus Multimedia in 2001.

The Modern Lovers' song "Roadrunner" appears on the soundtrack to the film School of Rock. In the commentary, director Richard Linklater mentions it is often called "the first punk song" and wanted to include it for that reason, along with all the other seminal rock songs in that film. Rapper M.I.A. featured the opening lyrics from "Roadrunner" in the song "Bamboo Banga" on her 2007 album, Kala.

As a producer himself, Richman and drummer Tommy Larkins produced Vic Chesnutt's final album Skitter on Take-Off in 2009 which appeared on Vapor Records. Chesnutt opened for Richman at concerts many times during his later years.

== Discography ==
=== Studio albums ===
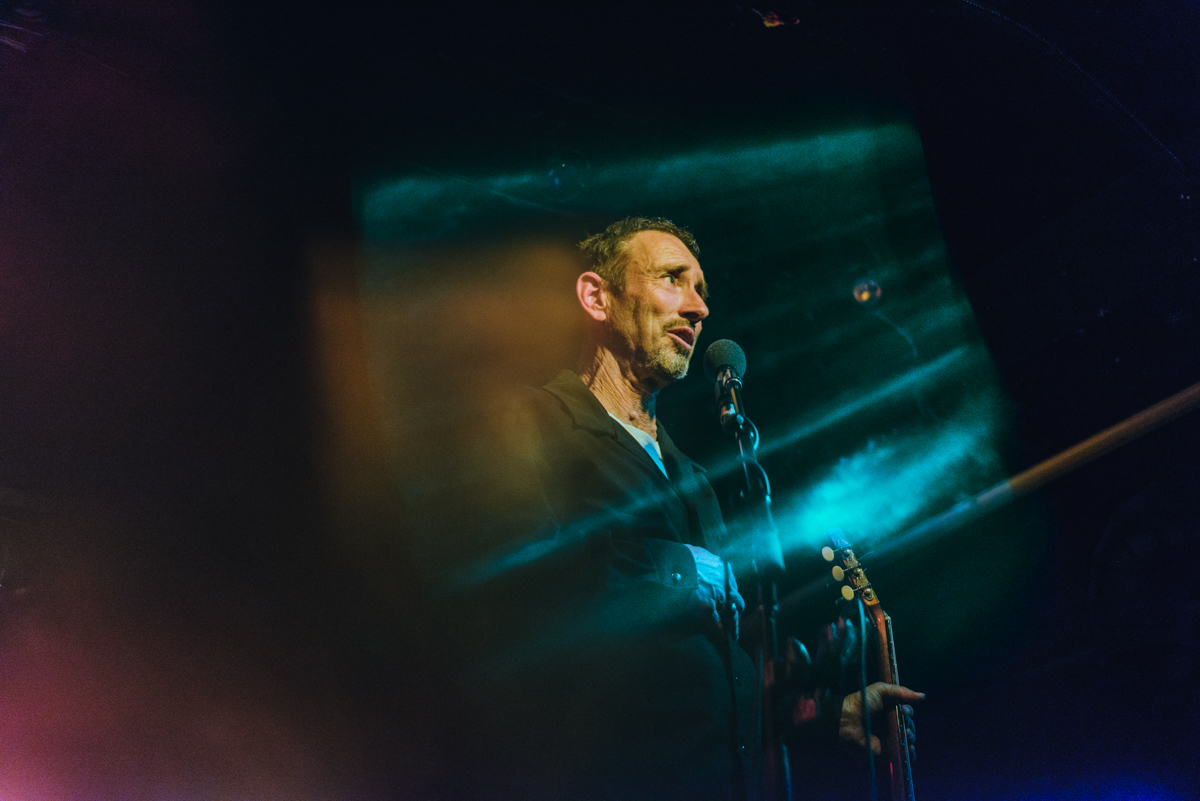
Richman performing in Edmonton in 2016

==== The Modern Lovers ====
- The Modern Lovers (1976)
- The Original Modern Lovers (1981)

==== Jonathan Richman and the Modern Lovers ====
- Jonathan Richman and the Modern Lovers (1976)
- Rock 'n' Roll with the Modern Lovers (1977) UK No. 50
- Back in Your Life (1979)
- Jonathan Sings! (1983)
- Rockin' and Romance (1985)
- It's Time For (1986)
- Modern Lovers 88 (1987)

==== Jonathan Richman ====
- Jonathan Richman (1989)
- Jonathan Goes Country (1990)
- Having a Party with Jonathan Richman (1991)
- I, Jonathan (1992)
- ¡Jonathan, Te Vas a Emocionar! (1994)
- You Must Ask the Heart (1995)
- Surrender to Jonathan! (1996)
- I'm So Confused (1998)
- Her Mystery Not of High Heels and Eye Shadow (2001)
- Not So Much to Be Loved as to Love (2004)
- Revolution Summer (2007)
- Because Her Beauty Is Raw and Wild (2008)
- ¿A qué venimos sino a caer? (2008)
- O Moon, Queen of Night on Earth (2010)
- Ishkode! Ishkode! (2016)
- SA! (2018)
- Want to Visit My Inner House? (2021)
- Only Frozen Sky Anyway (2025)

=== EPs ===
- Cold Pizza & Other Hot Stuff (2022)
- Yatasamaroun (2023)

=== Live albums ===
- Modern Lovers 'Live' (1977)
- Live at the Longbranch Saloon (1992)*
- Precise Modern Lovers Order (1994)*
- Live at the Longbranch and More (1998)*

*From the same three 1971-73 performances; track listings differ

=== Compilations ===
- Jonathan Richman Songbook (1979)
- The Beserkley Years: The Best of Jonathan Richman and the Modern Lovers (1986)
- Mega Hits (1988)
- 23 Great Recordings by Jonathan Richman and the Modern Lovers (1990)
- A Plea for Tenderness (1995)
- Radio On: Stop and Shop with the Modern Lovers (1997)
- I Must Be King (1998)
- Roadrunner (1998)
- The Best of Jonathan Richman & the Modern Lovers (1999)
- Egyptian Reggae (2000)
- An Introspective (2000)
- Action Packed: The Best of Jonathan Richman (2002)
- Roadrunner, Roadrunner: The Beserkley Collection (2004)
- Vampire Girl (2006)
- No Me Quejo De Mi Estrella (2014)

=== Various artists compilation appearances ===
- Alternate versions of "Roadrunner" and "Government Center", along with "The New Teller" and "It Will Stand", first appeared on Beserkley Chartbusters Vol. 1 (1975).
- "I'm Straight" and "Government Center", from the Modern Lovers' Kim Fowley-produced Beserkley sessions, first appeared on the Warner Bros. Records compilation Troublemakers (1980).
- "I Like Gumby", on the tribute album Gumby (1989).
- "Hot Nights" (live), on the HIV/AIDS benefit album No Alternative (1993), produced by the Red Hot Organization.
- "Mustapha" and "Mustapha (Instrumental)", on Think About Mustapha (1994).
- "Broken Promises", on the Rainer Ptacek tribute album The Inner Flame (1997).
- "Stop Your Sobbing", on the Kinks tribute album This Is Where I Belong (2002).
- "The Origin of Love", on Wig in a Box (2003).
- "Our Dog Is Getting Older Now", on the charity album Colours Are Brighter (2006).

=== Singles ===
US issues except where stated

- "Friday on My Mind" (by Earth Quake) / "Roadrunner" (Beserkley B-5701, 1974)
- "Road Runner" / "It Will Stand" (United Artists UP36006, UK, 1975)
- "Roadrunner (Once)" / "Roadrunner (Twice)" (by The Modern Lovers) (Beserkley BZZ 1, UK, 7/1977) UK No. 11
- "Roadrunner" / "Pablo Picasso" (Beserkley PA-205, Japan 1976)
- "New England" / "Here Come the Martian Martians" (Beserkley B-5743, 1976)
- "Egyptian Reggae" / "Ice Cream Man" (Beserkley 6.12 217, 1977)
- "Egyptian Reggae" / "Rollercoaster by the Sea" (Beserkley BZZ 2, UK, 1977) UK No. 5, AUS No 50
- "The Morning of Our Lives (Live)" / "Roadrunner (Thrice) (Live)" (Beserkley BZZ 7, UK, 1977) UK No. 29
- "New England (Live)" / "Astral Plane (Live)" (Beserkley BZZ 14, UK, 1978)
- "Abdul and Cleopatra" / "Astral Plane (Live)" (Beserkley 11813, 1978)
- "Abdul and Cleopatra" / "Oh Carol" (Beserkley BZZ 19, UK, 1978)
- "Buzz, Buzz, Buzz" / "Abdul and Cleopatra" (Beserkley 6.12 311, 1978)
- "Buzz, Buzz, Buzz" / "Hospital (Live)" (BZZ 25, UK, 1978)
- "My Little Kookenhaken" / "Roadrunner (Thrice) (Live)" (Beserkley 11819, 1978)
- "South American Folk Song (Live)" / "Ice Cream Man (Live)" (1978)
- "Lydia" / "Important in Your Life" (BZZ 28, UK, 1979)
- "That Summer Feeling" / "This Kind of Music" (1984)
- "That Summer Feeling" / "This Kind of Music" / "Tag Game" (Rough Trade RTT 152, UK, 1984)
- "I'm Just Beginning To Live" / "Circle I" (1985)
- "I'm Just Beginning To Live" / "Circle I" / "Shirin and Fahrad" (Rough Trade RTT 154, UK, 1985)
- "California Desert Party" / "When Harpo Played His Harp" (DRD 1D474, Spain, 1988)
- "Egyptian Reggae" / "Roadrunner" (1989)
