= None Shall Escape the Judgement =

Single by Earl Zero
- Released: 1973
- Recorded: 1973
- Genre: Reggae
- Label: N/A
- Songwriter: Earl Zero

"None Shall Escape the Judgement" is a 1973 song by Jamaican musician Earl Zero. It has spawned numerous cover versions.

== Johnny Clarke version ==
A cover version by Johnny Clarke was a hit for him in 1974 and became the title track on his debut album.

== Jonathan Richman and the Modern Lovers, "Egyptian Reggae" ==
Jonathan Richman and the Modern Lovers had a UK #5 hit with an instrumental version of this song in 1977 titled "Egyptian Reggae". The track was included on the album Rock 'n' Roll with the Modern Lovers. Although the writing credit was originally given to Richman, later reissues of the track credited Earl Zero.
