= Jonathan Goes Country =

Studio album by Jonathan Richman
- Released: 1990
- Studios: Column One Recording, Springfield, Missouri
- Length: 31:10
- Label: Rounder
- Producers: Lou Whitney, D. Clinton Thompson

Jonathan Richman chronology
Jonathan Richman (1989)	Jonathan Goes Country (1990)	Having a Party with Jonathan Richman (1991)

Professional ratings
Review scores
Source	Rating
AllMusic	3.5/5 stars
PopMatters	(not rated)
Uncut	9/10

Jonathan Goes Country is Jonathan Richman's second solo studio album. It contains seven original songs, three of which are reworked from the Jonathan Richman and the Modern Lovers album Jonathan Sings! (1983), and five covers of songs by Tammy Wynette, Ronee Blakely, Marty Robbins, Skeeter Davis, and Porter Wagoner. Tom Brumley, pedal steel guitarist for the Buckaroos, is featured on the opening track.

== Track listing ==
All tracks composed by Jonathan Richman; except where indicated

1. "Since She Started to Ride" – 2:31
2. "Reno" – 3:58
3. "You're the One for Me" – 3:09
4. "Your Good Girl's Gonna Go Bad" (Billy Sherrill, Glenn Sutton) – 2:58
5. "I Must Be King" – 2:25
6. "You're Crazy for Taking the Bus" – 2:29
7. "Rodeo Wind" (Ronee Blakley) – 2:15
8. "Corner Store" – 2:59
9. "The Neighbors" – 2:42
10. "Man Walks Among Us" (Marty Robbins) – 2:19
11. "I Can't Stay Mad at You" (Gerry Goffin, Carole King) – 1:33
12. "Satisfied Mind" (Jack Rhodes, Red Hayes) – 1:52

== Personnel ==
- Jonathan Richman - guitar, vocals
- D. Clinton Thompson - electric guitar, acoustic guitar, percussion, backing vocals
- Tom Brumley - steel guitar
- Lou Whitney - bass guitar
- Joe Terry - piano, backing vocals
- David Byrd - piano
- Ned Claflin - accordion, backing vocals
- Ned Wilkinson - backing vocals
- Bobby Lloyd Hicks - drums, backing vocals
- Ron Gremp - drums
- Nick Sibley - harmonica, backing vocals
- Jody Ross - duet vocals on "The Neighbors"
