= Earl Zero =

- Born: Earl Anthony Johnson; 1953 (age 71–72)
- Origin: Kingston, Jamaica
- Genres: Reggae
- Occupation: Singer
- Years active: Early 1970s–present

Earl Anthony Johnson (born 1953), better known as Earl Zero, is a Jamaican roots reggae artist, whose career began in the 1970s. He is the uncle of Toronto rapper Raz Fresco.

== History ==
Born 1953 in the Greenwich Town area of Kingston, Johnson was the eldest of ten children, his father a fisherman and his mother a fishmonger. Zero began his career in the 1970s, first as a member of the group Rush-It with his childhood friend Earl "Chinna" Smith, who recorded for producer Bunny Lee, who gave him the name 'Earl Zero' to distinguish him from Smith. His song "None Shall Escape the Judgement" was a hit for Johnny Clarke when recorded by the singer in 1974, and proto punk garage band artist Jonathan Richman and the Modern Lovers had a UK #5 hit with an instrumental version of "None Shall Escape the Judgement" in 1977 titled "Egyptian Reggae". The track was included on the album Rock 'n' Roll with the Modern Lovers. Although the writing credit was originally given to Richman, later reissues of the track credited Earl Zero.

Zero first had success as a singer himself with the Al Campbell-produced "Righteous Works" in 1975. He recorded for Don Mais' Roots Tradition label (recording "Home Sweet Home" and "I No Lie"), and joined Tommy Cowan's Talent Corporation roster, and had further success with "Please Officer", recorded with Augustus Pablo and Prince Jammy, and "City of the Weak Heart", released on Cowan's Arab label, the latter also recorded by Jacob Miller on his Killer Miller album. In 1976 he moved on to work with Bertram Brown, recording "Get Happy", and again recorded with Campbell on "Heart Desire". He continued recording through the late 1970s, recording with Soul Syndicate. His first two albums, Visions of Love and In the Right Way, were released in 1979.

In 1979 he relocated to northern California, and continued to record since, with several albums released. Much of his Freedom Sounds label music was re-released in the mid-1990s on Steve Barrow and Mick Hucknall's Blood and Fire label on the album entitled King Tubby & Soul Syndicate – Freedom Sounds in Dub, thereby introducing his sounds to new generations of listeners, and his works are still consistently held in high regard and in demand with sound-systems worldwide. His latest album is Marketplace, to be released in Spring 2011 with producer Siahvash Dowlatshahi. The album features members of the Roots Radics, The Greyboy Allstars, The Devastators and others.

== Discography ==
- Visions of Love (1979), Epiphany
- In the Right Way aka Only Jah Can Ease the Pressure (1979), Freedom Sounds/Student
- Roots & Romance (2001)
- And God Said to Man (2010), A-Lone
- Marketplace (2011), Foreign Key Records
- Earl Zero Meets Sideway (Big Fisherman In Dub) (2020), Sideway Outernational Records
