= Jonathan Richman and the Modern Lovers (album) =

Studio album by Jonathan Richman and the Modern Lovers
- Released: July 1976
- Recorded: 1976
- Studios: CBS, San Francisco
- Genre: Rock and roll
- Length: 34:18
- Label: Beserkley
- Producers: Matthew King Kaufman, Glen Kolotkin

Jonathan Richman and the Modern Lovers chronology
Jonathan Richman and the Modern Lovers (1976)	The Modern Lovers (1976)

Professional ratings
Review scores
Source	Rating
AllMusic	4.5/5 stars
Christgau's Record Guide	B+
The Rolling Stone Album Guide	4.5/5 stars
Spin Alternative Record Guide	4/10

Jonathan Richman and the Modern Lovers is the first album by American rock band Jonathan Richman and the Modern Lovers, released by Beserkley Records in July 1976.

== Track listing ==
All tracks are written by Jonathan Richman, except where noted.

Side One
No.	Title	Writer(s)	Length
1.	"Rockin' Shopping Center"		3:33
2.	"Back in the U.S.A."	Chuck Berry	2:22
3.	"Important in Your Life"		3:36
4.	"New England"		2:22
5.	"Lonely Financial Zone"		3:00
Total length:			14:53

Side Two
No.	Title	Writer(s)	Length
6.	"Hi Dear"		3:21
7.	"Abominable Snowman in the Market"		2:25
8.	"Hey There Little Insect"		3:08
9.	"Here Come the Martian Martians"		3:13
10.	"Springtime"		3:52
11.	"Amazing Grace"	John Newton	2:51
Total length:			18:50

=== 2000 re-issue bonus 12" ===
Side Three
No.	Title	Writer(s)	Length
12.	"It Will Stand"	General Johnson	2:35
13.	"Government Center"		2:15
Total length:			4:50

Side Four
No.	Title	Length
14.	"The New Teller"	1:39
15.	"Roadrunner (Once)"	4:42
Total length:		6:21

== Personnel ==
Jonathan Richman and the Modern Lovers

- Jonathan Richman – vocals, guitars
- Greg 'Curly' Keranen – bass, vocals
- Leroy Radcliffe – guitar, vocals
- David Robinson – drums, vocals

Technical

- Matthew King Kaufman – producer
- Glen Kolotkin – producer, engineer
- Tom Lubin – assistant engineer
- Fabian Bachrach – cover photography
- Elsa Dorfman – photography
- George Horn – mastering
- Flaming Neon – LP concept
- Jim Blodgett – LP coordination
