= Her Mystery Not of High Heels and Eye Shadow =

Studio album by Jonathan Richman
- Released: 2001
- Genre: Rock
- Label: Vapor
- Producer: Niko Bolas, Jonathan Richman

Jonathan Richman chronology
An Introspective (2000)	Her Mystery Not of High Heels and Eye Shadow (2001)	Action Packed: The Best of Jonathan Richman (2002)

Her Mystery Not of High Heels and Eye Shadow is an album by the American musician Jonathan Richman, released in 2001. It was his third album for Vapor Records. Richman supported the album with a North American tour.

== Production ==
The album was produced by Niko Bolas and Richman; Richman felt that some of his previous albums had been overproduced. Richman was again backed by stand-up drummer Tommy Larkins. Ralph Carney contributed on woodwinds. "Vampiresa Mujer" is a remake of Richman's "Vampire Girl". "Give Paris One More Chance" is a new version of a song Richman recorded for Jonathan Sings! "Leaves on the Sidewalk After the Rain" and "Maybe a Walk Home from Natick High" are instrumentals. "Springtime in New York" describes walking through Tompkins Square Park.

== Critical reception ==
Professional ratings
Review scores
Source	Rating
AllMusic	3/5 stars
Orlando Sentinel	4/5 stars
The Philadelphia Inquirer	3/4 stars
Pitchfork	8.0/10

The New York Times wrote that "rock's mooniest troubadour veils his wit in a cloud of romantic simplicity." Pitchfork noted that "albums this unpretentious are increasingly rare ... that's what makes Her Mystery Not of High Heels and Eye Shadow so seductive." The Hartford Courant called Richman "so forthright and free of irony that he may be mistaken as a children's performer, he is nonetheless full of unique adult insights."

The Orlando Sentinel praised "My Love for Her Ain't Sad", writing that "the open harmonies in the gut-string guitar solo fall somewhere in the rich middle ground between country, folk and rock." The Washington Post concluded that "Richman can seem a little too stuck in (or on) his own past... Yet there's always the fresh amour of songs like 'Me and Her Got a Good Thing Goin' Baby' to reinvigorate his sorta folky, sorta old-timey rock-and-roll." The Gazette said that "the disc has a rough, deliciously sloppy garage-band feel to it."

AllMusic stated that "the title track is pure magic; its moonstruck words and gently swinging sound, even its cumbersome title, posit an alternative universe in which rock & roll only became more innocent and naïve after the '50s."

== Track listing ==
All tracks are written by Jonathan Richman.

No.	Title	Length
1.	"Her Mystery Not of High Heels and Eye Shadow"	2:25
2.	"Springtime in New York"	2:54
3.	"Me and Her Got a Good Thing Goin' Baby"	2:44
4.	"Couples Must Fight"	2:05
5.	"I Took a Chance on Her"	2:51
6.	"Maybe a Walk Home from Natick High School"	1:16
7.	"Give Paris One More Chance"	2:42
8.	"My Love for Her Ain't Sad"	1:30
9.	"Leaves on the Sidewalk After the Rain"	0:44
10.	"Tonight"	2:09
11.	"Yo Tengo Una Novia"	2:35
12.	"El Joven So Estremece"	2:50
13.	"Con El Merengue"	2:04
14.	"Vampiresa Mujer (Vampire Girl)"	3:31
Total length:		32:20
