= You Must Ask the Heart =

Studio album by Jonathan Richman
- Released: 1995
- Label: Rounder
- Producer: Brennan Totten

Jonathan Richman chronology
¡Jonathan, Te Vas a Emocionar! (1994)	You Must Ask the Heart (1995)	A Plea for Tenderness (1995)

You Must Ask the Heart is an album by the American musician Jonathan Richman, released in 1995. Richman supported the album with a North American tour. He included a more up-tempo version of "To Hide a Little Thought" on 1996's Surrender to Jonathan!

== Production ==
Richman recorded the album in a casual manner, using whichever musicians could make the sessions and figuring out the sound based on the personnel. He emphasized keyboards on You Must Ask the Heart. "Just Because I'm Irish" is a duet with Julia Sweeney; the pair first performed it on Late Night with Conan O'Brien. "The Rose" is a cover of the Amanda McBroom composition. The tribute to Walter Johnson is sung a cappella. The cover of Tom Waits's "The Heart of Saturday Night" is performed in a rockabilly style. "Nothing Can Change This Love" was originally performed by Sam Cooke. "Amorcito Corazon" was inspired by Richman's frequent tours of Spain. "Let Her Go into the Darkness" is about a girlfriend returning to an alcoholic ex.

== Critical reception ==
Professional ratings
Review scores
Source	Rating
AllMusic	4/5 stars
Chicago Tribune	3.5/4 stars
The Encyclopedia of Popular Music	2/5 stars
Entertainment Weekly	C−
MusicHound Rock: The Essential Album Guide	3/5 stars
The Republican	2.5/5 stars
The Tampa Tribune	2.5/4 stars

The Edmonton Journal noted the "hummable hooks, warmly expressed obsessions and the usual romantic commentary." Trouser Press concluded: "Employing innocence like an instrument, Richman turns the joyfully spirited You Must Ask the Heart into an amazing feat." The Gazette called the album another of Richman's "dippy little records, full of oddball observations, droll humor and adenoidal singing."

The Chicago Tribune stated that, "beneath his naive facade, Richman is a canny social observer who can cut to the heart of a gamut of emotions and yearnings." Entertainment Weekly determined that "emotional complexities seem beyond his reach, making this monotonous and insubstantial." The Houston Press opined: "Self-conscious perhaps, but never self-indulgent, his songs don't get mired in the vague soul purging that makes many singer-songwriters insufferable."

AllMusic wrote that "Richman sings with remarkable energy and honesty; even after dozens of records, his joyful spirit remains undimmed."

== Track listing ==
No.	Title	Length
1.	"To Hide a Little Thought"
2.	"The Heart of Saturday Night"
3.	"Vampire Girl"
4.	"Just Because I'm Irish"
5.	"That's How I Feel"
6.	"Let Her Go into the Darkness"
7.	"The Rose"
8.	"You Must Ask the Heart"
9.	"Nothing Can Change This Love"
10.	"Amorcito Corazon"
11.	"City Vs. Country"
12.	"Walter Johnson"
13.	"Nishi"
