= Wampas =

Wampas may refer to:

- Wampa, a fictional animal
- Les Wampas, a French punk rock/psychobilly band
- WAMPAS Baby Stars, a list of movie stars

== See also ==
- Wampus (disambiguation)
