= Jonathan Richman (album) =

Studio album by Jonathan Richman
- Released: 1989
- Recorded: 1989
- Studio: Bennett House, Grass Valley, California
- Genre: Rock 'n' roll
- Length: 35:45
- Label: Rounder ROUND 9021
- Producer: Brennan Totten

Jonathan Richman chronology
Modern Lovers 88 (1988)	Jonathan Richman (1989)	Jonathan Goes Country (1990)

Jonathan Richman is a solo album by Jonathan Richman, released by Rounder Records in 1989. With the exception of "Blue Moon" and "Sleepwalk", the songs were recorded as vocal and guitar solos by Richman, who provided percussion with his feet. "I Eat With Gusto, Damn! You Bet" is spoken-word.

== Critical reception ==
Professional ratings
Review scores
Source	Rating
AllMusic	3/5 stars
Chicago Tribune	3/4 stars

The Chicago Tribune praised Richman's "perennially palpable sincerity."

== Track listing ==
All tracks written by Jonathan Richman except where noted.

1. "Malagueña de Jojo" (Marian Banks, Ernesto Lecuona) – 2:08
2. "Action Packed" (Jack Rhodes) – 2:51
3. "Everyday Clothes" – 3:01
4. "Fender Stratocaster" – 2:51
5. "Blue Moon" (Richard Rodgers, Lorenz Hart) – 3:50
6. "Closer" – 3:26
7. "I Eat With Gusto, Damn! You Bet" – 3:50
8. "Miracles Will Start to Happen" – 3:03
9. "Sleepwalk" (Santo Farina, Johnny Farina) – 2:09
10. "Que reste-t-il de nos amours ?" (Charles Trenet) – 1:54
11. "A Mistake Today for Me" – 2:09
12. "Cerca" (Spanish version of "Closer") – 3:40

== Personnel ==
- Jonathan Richman – vocals, guitar
- Curly Keranen – bass on "Blue Moon" and "Sleepwalk"
- Ron "Wipeout" Wilson – drums on "Blue Moon" and "Sleepwalk"

Technical

- Brennan Totten – producer
- Paul Emery – engineer
