= Back in Your Life =

Back in Your Life may refer to:

- Back in Your Life (Julian Austin album), 2000, or the title track
- Back in Your Life (Jonathan Richman album), 1979, or the title track
