= Only Frozen Sky Anyway =

Studio album by Jonathan Richman
- Released: July 4, 2025
- Recorded: January 5–10, 2025
- Studio: The Mountain Studio, California
- Length: 39:34
- Label: Blue Arrow
- Producer: Jonathan Richman; Jerry Harrison; Nicole Montalbano

Jonathan Richman chronology
Yatasamaroun (2023)	Only Frozen Sky Anyway (2025)

Only Frozen Sky Anyway is a studio album by American musician and songwriter Jonathan Richman. It was released on July 4, 2025, on Blue Arrow records. The album features and was co-produced by Jerry Harrison, Richman's bandmate from the Modern Lovers. Critics noted themes of death and mortality in the album's lyrics.

== Recording and release ==
Only Frozen Sky Anyway was recorded at The Mountain Studio in Marin County, California, and was produced by Richman, Nicole Montalbano, and Jerry Harrison. Harrison, who was a member of Richman's band the Modern Lovers in the 1970s, features extensively on the album alongside percussionist Tommy Larkins.

Only Frozen Sky Anyway was released on July 4, 2025, on Blue Arrow records. It is Richman's 18th studio album.

== Critical reception ==
Professional ratings
Review scores
Source	Rating
Mojo	4/5 stars
Mondo Sonoro	6/10
Pitchfork	7.8/10
PopMatters	8/10
Uncut	8/10

Uncut called the album "a seriocomic meditation on the absurdity of humanity, unfailingly generous in music and spirit alike." Mojo described Richman's voice as "plaintive, wayward, a little deeper in tone now".

In a review for Pitchfork, Stephen Thomas Erlewine wrote that "the loose, intuitive instrumental interplay is crucial to the album’s charm. Often, songs feel as if they’re conjured from the air", and that "though [Richman] doesn’t dwell on the subject, death is the thread that ties together Only Frozen Sky Anyway."

== Track listing ==
All tracks are written by Jonathan Richman, unless otherwise specified.

No.	Title	Writer(s)	Length
1.	"I Was Just a Piece of Frozen Sky Anyway"		3:27
2.	"But We Might Try Weird Stuff"		3:36
3.	"Night Fever"	Barry Gibb; Maurice Gibb; Robin Gibb	3:35
4.	"You Need Me Too"		2:29
5.	"The Dog Star"		3:34
6.	"Se Va Pa'volver"		2:43
7.	"That Older Girl"		5:10
8.	"Little Black Bat"	Richman; Mauro Vacca	3:16
9.	"O Guitar"		2:52
10.	"David & Goliath"		4:46
11.	"The Wavelet"	Paramahansa Yogananda	3:11
12.	"I Am the Sky"	Yogananda	0:55
Total length:			39:34

== Personnel ==
Credits adapted from Tidal.

- Jonathan Richman – lead vocals, acoustic guitar, production
- Nicole Montalbano – production (all tracks), strings (tracks 11, 12)
- Jerry Harrison – production
- Tommy Larkins – drums (1–3, 5–10)
- Tommy Dunbar – acoustic guitar (4)
- Don Spindt – drums (4)
- Jake Sprecher – background vocals (5)
- Marty Parker – background vocals (5)
- David Alvarez – acoustic guitar (6)
- Kenny Parker – background vocals (6)
