= Wampus =

Wampus may refer to:

- Wampus cat, a cat-like creature in American folklore
- Wampus Multimedia, an American record label and media company founded by Mark Doyon
- Mountain wampus, a fictional creature in the 1983 video game M.U.L.E.
- Wampus Cats, an American blues band featuring Oscar "Buddy" Woods
- West Campus, Austin, Texas, a neighborhood of Austin

== See also ==
- Wumpus (disambiguation)
