= Wumpus =

Wumpus may refer to:

- Hunt the Wumpus, a 1973 grid-based computer game
- Elleston Trevor, who wrote a series of children's books about a character named "Wumpus"
- Wumpus, the mascot of the messaging software Discord

== See also ==
- Wampus (disambiguation)
