= I, Jonathan =

Studio album by Jonathan Richman
- Released: 1992
- Recorded: 1991
- Genres: Lo-fi; indie pop
- Length: 38:23
- Label: Rounder ROUND 9036
- Producer: Brennan Totten

Jonathan Richman chronology
Having a Party with Jonathan Richman (1991)	I, Jonathan (1992)	¡Jonathan, Te Vas a Emocionar! (1995)

I, Jonathan is the fourth solo album by Jonathan Richman, released by the Rounder Records label in 1992. As the founder of influential proto-punk band the Modern Lovers, Richman had striven to convey authentic emotions and storytelling with his music. I, Jonathan continued this aesthetic with simple and sparse rock and roll arrangements, and straightforward lyrics about everyday topics, such as music, parties, summer, and dancing. It is widely-regarded as one of his best works, and is considered an influential album in the lo-fi genre.

== Lyrics and composition ==
Songs on the album address such diverse subjects as dancing freely with a group of welcoming young lesbians ("I Was Dancing in the Lesbian Bar") and sky-diving with a surf-rock twist ("Tandem Jump"). The instrumental track "Grunion Run" is named after the grunion species of fish found off the coast of California.

Wistfulness is a recurrent theme throughout the album. "Parties in the U.S.A" sees Richman nostalgic for the backyard parties of the '60s, "Twilight in Boston" and "Rooming House on Venice Beach" are based on his memories of neighbourhoods in which he had lived in the past, and "That Summer Feeling" is brimming with nostalgia for the summer holidays of one's youth. "That Summer Feeling", which was first recorded on his 1983 Jonathan Sings! album, is somewhat extended in this 1992 version.

"You Can't Talk to the Dude" tells the story of a woman who is unable to communicate with the man she is in a relationship with. In "Higher Power", the narrator describes the way he got together with his girl as "magic" from a higher power.

The lyrics of "Velvet Underground" are about Richman's admiration of his primary musical inspiration, The Velvet Underground. The song includes a brief interlude of The Velvet Underground song, "Sister Ray", where Richman launches into an impression of singer Lou Reed.

The melody of "Parties in the U.S.A" is likely inspired by The McCoys' hit single "Hang on Sloopy" (1956). "Tandem Jump" borrows musically from the surf rock genre.

== Recording ==
The album was recorded in the summer of 1991 "in John 'Guitar' Girton's cozy frayed carpet of a basement studio" in the "summer swelter" of Grass Valley, California.

== Release and legacy ==
The album helped increase Richman's cultural profile. In 1993, SNL cast member Julia Sweeney interviewed him for SPIN. The same year, he also appeared on Late Night with Conan O'Brien, the second ever musical guest after Radiohead, during which he performed one of the album's songs, "I Was Dancing in the Lesbian Bar." He would go on to appear multiple times on the show. The song would go on to become, arguably, Richman's most well-known solo work.

I, Jonathan was originally released on Cassette and Compact Disc, and was released by Craft Recordings on vinyl for the first time in 2020.

== Critical reception ==
Professional ratings
Review scores
Source	Rating
AllMusic	4.5/5 stars
Pitchfork	8.7/10

In an album retrospective for Pitchfork in 2018, where he rates the album 8.7 out of 10, Marc Hogan writes, "Richman uses ’60s rock’n’roll tropes and images to illuminate his vision of a better life in the present." He further states, "Richman’s work is about being fully present in the moment with other people, ... I, Jonathan is as close as he’s come, and it’s a perfect gateway to all that his music promises." He describes "I Was Dancing in the Lesbian Bar" as "pure joie de vivre, political merely by its existence."

In 2014, former music editor for The Guardian Michael Hann rated "I Was Dancing in the Lesbian Bar" and "Velvet Underground" among Richman's top 10 best ever songs.

Jason Ankeny, writing for AllMusic, states that the album is "sloppy and wild" and also "the album is a blast from start to finish".

== Track listing ==
All songs were written by Jonathan Richman unless otherwise noted.

No.	Title	Length
1.	"Parties in the U.S.A."	4:42
2.	"Tandem Jump"	2:10
3.	"You Can't Talk to the Dude"	2:49
4.	"Velvet Underground" (Richman, Lou Reed)	3:23
5.	"I Was Dancing in the Lesbian Bar"	3:40
6.	"Rooming House on Venice Beach"	5:04
7.	"That Summer Feeling"	6:02
8.	"Grunion Run"	2:31
9.	"A Higher Power"	3:02
10.	"Twilight in Boston"	4:08
Total length:		37:31

== Personnel ==
- Jonathan Richman - vocals, guitars, bass ("Velvet Underground")
- Ned Claflin - vocals, tremolo guitar and 2nd guitar on "Grunion Run"
- Tom Nelson - vocals
- Scot Woodland - vocals, congas
- Josef Marc - bass, drums ("I Was Dancing In The Lesbian Bar"), guitar ("Twilight in Boston")
- Steve Nobels - percussion, backing singing
- Jason Wilkinson - percussion, drums ("Parties in the USA"), backing singing
- John Rinkor - percussion, bass ("Parties in the USA"), backing singing
- Mike Buckmaster - percussion, backing singing
- Willie Robertson - percussion, backing singing
- Andy Paley - drums ("Grunion Run")
- Brennan Totten - drums ("A Higher Power")
- Jim Washburn - bass ("That Summer Feeling", "Twilight in Boston" and "Grunion Run")
- John Girton - guitar ("That Summer Feeling")
- Brennan Totten - producer
- John Girton - engineer
