= The Original Modern Lovers =

Studio album by The Modern Lovers
- Released: October 1981
- Recorded: October 1973
- Genre: Proto-punk; garage rock
- Length: 33:38
- Label: Mohawk; Bomp!
- Producer: Kim Fowley

The Modern Lovers chronology
The Modern Lovers (1976)	The Original Modern Lovers (1981)	Live at the Longbranch Saloon (1992)

Jonathan Richman chronology
Back in Your Life (1979)	The Original Modern Lovers (1981)	Jonathan Sings! (1983)

Professional ratings
Review scores
Source	Rating
AllMusic	3.5/5 stars
Spin Alternative Record Guide	9/10

The Original Modern Lovers is an album of songs recorded by American rock band the Modern Lovers. The sessions were produced by Kim Fowley in 1973 and first released in 1981 by Fowley's short-lived Mohawk Records label, a subsidiary of Bomp! Records.

== Background ==
After recording demo sessions in 1972 with John Cale for Warner Bros. Records and others with Alan Mason and Robert Appere for A&M, the Modern Lovers re-performed some of the same songs, as well as some previously not recorded, with music impresario Kim Fowley. Some of these tracks were produced by Stuart "Dinky" Dawson and would appear on the 1986 reissue of the band's self-titled album that compiled both the Warner Bros. and A&M demos. Other tracks recorded by Fowley were less polished, with frontman Jonathan Richman taking inspiration from Stooges vocalist Iggy Pop. These included new versions of "She Cracked", "Astral Plane", "I'm Straight", "Girlfriend" and two versions of "Roadrunner", as well as the songs "I Wanna Sleep In Your Arms", "Walk Up The Street", "Dance With Me" and the a cappella "Don't Let Our Youth Go To Waste". Richman also credited James Osterberg (Iggy Pop) as co-writer on "I Wanna Sleep In Your Arms" as a way of acknowledging that the song borrows a Stooges guitar riff.

After deciding to sign with Warner Bros. and enlisting Cale as producer, the band began to fall apart due to personal and artistic differences between its members. Richman now wanted his songs to be mellower and less aggressive. The Modern Lovers' second recording date with Cale was cancelled and Warner Bros. hired Kim Fowley to work with the band again, but without results. Warner Bros. terminated the Modern Lovers' contract and the band broke up in 1974.

== Release ==
Beserkley Records issued the more polished demo sessions as The Modern Lovers in 1976, and 10 of Fowley's rougher versions came out five years later as The Original Modern Lovers with certain song titles appearing in alternate spellings. The LP was the second and final release on Fowley's label Mohawk Records (the other being by Los Angeles punk band the Germs), a subsidiary of Bomp! Records who would issue further editions of the LP. Richman has taken issue with the album's title because the Jerry Harrison/Ernie Brooks/David Robinson line up was not the original formation of the band. There are also disputes about when the versions of the songs on The Original Modern Lovers were actually recorded.

== Track listing ==
All songs by Jonathan Richman, except "I Wanna Sleep In Your Arms" by Jonathan Richman and James Osterberg.

1. "Road Runner #1"†
2. "She Cracked"
3. "Astral Plain"†
4. "I'm Straight"‡
5. "Walk up the Street"
6. "I Wanna Sleep in Your Arms"
7. "Don't Let Our Youth Go to Waste"
8. "Dance With Me"
9. "Girlfren"†
10. "Road Runner #2"†

† Song title spellings vary on different Modern Lovers albums.
‡ "I'm Straight" appeared on the Mohawk Records edition of the album but was omitted for further Bomp! releases. It differs from the version that would surface on reissues of the band's first album

== Personnel ==
The Modern Lovers

- Jonathan Richman – vocals, electric guitars
- Jerry Harrison – piano, organ, backing vocals
- Ernie Brooks – bass, backing vocals
- David Robinson – drums, backing vocals
