= Having a Party with Jonathan Richman =

Studio album by Jonathan Richman
- Released: 1991
- Label: Rounder
- Producer: Brennan Totten

Jonathan Richman chronology
Jonathan Goes Country (1990)	Having a Party with Jonathan Richman (1991)	I, Jonathan (1992)

Having a Party with Jonathan Richman is an album by the American musician Jonathan Richman, released in 1991. Richman supported the album with a North American tour.

== Production ==
The album contains live and studio tracks, performed by Richman with just his guitar and voice, with occasional percussion. It was produced by Brennan Totten. The songs are mostly about relationships, with Richman writing in the liner notes that his musical style and methods remain unchanged. The cover photo was taken near Richman's home, around Sacramento, California.

== Critical reception ==
Professional ratings
Review scores
Source	Rating
AllMusic	3/5 stars
Robert Christgau	(1-star Honorable Mention)
The Encyclopedia of Popular Music	3/5 stars
Entertainment Weekly	B
MusicHound Rock: The Essential Album Guide	3.5/5 stars
Orlando Sentinel	3/5 stars
The Republican	3.5/5 stars
(The New) Rolling Stone Album Guide	3/5 stars
The San Diego Union-Tribune	3/5 stars
Spin Alternative Record Guide	5/10

Trouser Press wrote: "In a pensive frame of mind for much of the record, Richman reconsiders past times with new-found gravity." Entertainment Weekly called the album "one of his most clear-eyed and least coy records... It’s chock-full of simplistic—but not simpleminded—songs about puzzling relationships." The Columbus Dispatch praised "My Career as a Homewrecker" and "The Girl Stands Up to Me Now". The Deseret News deemed Richman "the new wave Mister Rogers of folk."

Robert Christgau described the album as the "confessions of a reluctant grownup." The Christian Science Monitor determined that, "as soon as the disc starts spinning and the strings start twanging, Richman delivers enough energy and wit to stop a roomful of conversation." The Republican noted that "he's one very funny guy, with an impressive ability to make the most out of the obvious."

AllMusic wrote that, "without a band to support him, Richman grows more pensive than usual."

== Track listing ==
No.	Title	Length
1.	"The Girl Stands Up to Me Now"
2.	"Cappuccino Bar"
3.	"My Career as a Homewrecker"
4.	"She Doesn't Laugh at My Jokes"
5.	"When She Kisses Me"
6.	"They're Not Tryin' on the Dance Floor"
7.	"At Night"
8.	"When I Say Wife"
9.	"1963"
10.	"Monologue About Bermuda"
11.	"Our Swingin' Pad"
12.	"Just for Fun"
