= I'm So Confused =

Studio album by Jonathan Richman
- Released: 1998
- Studio: Electric Lady
- Label: Vapor
- Producer: Ric Ocasek

Jonathan Richman chronology
Surrender to Jonathan! (1996)	I'm So Confused (1998)	An Introspection (2000)

I'm So Confused is an album by Jonathan Richman, released in 1998.

== Production ==
I'm So Confused was produced by Ric Ocasek. Darryl Jenifer played bass on the album.

== Critical reception ==
Professional ratings
Review scores
Source	Rating
AllMusic	3/5 stars
The Austin Chronicle	3.5/5 stars
Entertainment Weekly	B+

The Austin Chronicle opined that Ocasek "takes Richman and drummer Tommy Larkins' two-man-band simplicity and augments it with just the right amount of bass and light keyboards." Entertainment Weekly thought that "for the first time in years, he's shed his grating penchant for writing soft-headed novelty songs in favor of ... grown-up, gently amusing tales that plumb love’s sweet mysteries." Spin concluded that "there's something sad and epic and beautiful about spending a lifetime trying to figure out what it means to be a teen."

AllMusic wrote that Richman's "charming nasal voice seems to have all but disappeared; it's been replaced with a sort of arty croon, as on the title cut and the dour 'Affection'."

== Track listing ==
All tracks are written by Jonathan Richman.

No.	Title	Length
1.	"When I Dance"
2.	"Nineteen in Naples"
3.	"I'm So Confused"
4.	"True Love Is Not Nice"
5.	"Love Me Like I Love"
6.	"Hello from Cupid"
7.	"If She Don't Love Me"
8.	"The Lonely Little Thrift Store"
9.	"Affection"
10.	"I Can Hear Her Fighting with Herself"
11.	"The Night Is Still Young"
12.	"I Can't Find My Best Friend"

== Personnel ==
- Jonathan Richman – Guitars, Vocals
- Tommy Larkins – Drums
- Darryl Jenifer – Bass
- Edwin Bonilla – Conga Drums on "The Lonely Little Thrift Store"
- Steph Dickson, Keren DeBerg – Background Vocals

== Sources ==
- Catlin, Roger (December 24, 1998). "I'm So Confused Jonathan Richman; Vapor Records". Hartford Courant. p. 6.
- Rocchi, James (December 3–9, 1998). "Wordsmith Jonathan Richman proves there's more about him than 'Mary' on his latest album". Metro Santa Cruz. Metro Publishing Inc.
- Ashare, Mark (December 1998). "Reviews > Jonathan Richman I'm So Confused". CMJ New Music Monthly. p. 71.
