= Rock 'n' Roll with the Modern Lovers =

Studio album by Jonathan Richman and the Modern Lovers
- Released: August 1977
- Recorded: 1977
- Studios: CBS, San Francisco
- Genre: Rock 'n' roll
- Length: 31:24
- Label: Beserkley
- Producers: Matthew King Kaufman, Glen Kolotkin

Jonathan Richman and the Modern Lovers chronology
The Modern Lovers (1976)	Rock 'n' Roll with the Modern Lovers (1977)	Back in Your Life (1979)

Rock 'n' Roll with the Modern Lovers is the second album by American rock band Jonathan Richman and the Modern Lovers, released by Beserkley Records in 1977.

The album reached No. 50 on the UK Albums Chart. The song "Egyptian Reggae" was a hit in Europe.

== Critical reception ==
Professional ratings
Review scores
Source	Rating
AllMusic	4.5/5 stars
Christgau's Record Guide	B+
The Encyclopedia of Popular Music	3/5 stars
MusicHound Rock: The Essential Album Guide	2/5 stars
The New Rolling Stone Record Guide	2/5 stars
Spin Alternative Record Guide	8/10

Dave Marsh in The New Rolling Stone Record Guide wrote that Richman "lost his vision and became once more a teenage twerp ... Now you know why everybody picked on that kid in high school." Greil Marcus, in The Village Voice, called the album "the purest rock and roll album I've heard this year, rooted as it is in the idea that as long as you keep a good beat, rock and roll is what you can get away with." Trouser Press wrote: "Mixing traditional folk songs and lullabies with originals that would do Mister Rogers proud ('Ice Cream Man,' 'Rockin' Rockin' Leprechaun'), the ironically titled album stretched the ability of his adult fans to join in the fun."

== Track listing ==
All tracks composed by Jonathan Richman, except where noted.

Side one

1. "Sweeping Wind (Kwa Ti Feng)" (traditional) – 1:59
2. "Ice Cream Man" – 3:01
3. "Rockin' Rockin' Leprechauns" – 2:09
4. "Summer Morning" – 3:49
5. "Afternoon" – 2:45
6. "Fly into the Mystery" – 3:19

Side two

1. "South American Folk Song" (traditional) – 2:34
2. "Roller Coaster by the Sea" – 2:05
3. "Dodge Veg-O-Matic" – 3:45
4. "Egyptian Reggae" – 2:34
5. "Coomyah" (Desmond Dekker) – 2:08
6. "Wheels on the Bus" (traditional) – 2:26
7. "Angels Watching over Me" (traditional) – 1:50

2004 CD bonus track

"Dodge Veg-O-Matic (Extended Version)" – 4:12

== Personnel ==
Jonathan Richman and the Modern Lovers

- Jonathan Richman – vocals, guitars
- Greg 'Curly' Keranen – bass, vocals
- Leroy Radcliffe – guitar, vocals
- D. Sharpe – drums, vocals

Technical

- Matthew King Kaufman – producer
- Glen Kolotkin – producer
- Carol Fondé – photography
- William Snyder – painting
- Tom Lubin – assistant engineer
- Phil Brown – mastering
- Flashing Neon – LP concept
- Jim Blodgett – art direction
- Billy Cole – logistics
