= Surrender to Jonathan! =

Studio album by Jonathan Richman
- Released: 1996
- Label: Vapor
- Producer: Andy Paley

Jonathan Richman chronology
You Must Ask the Heart (1995)	Surrender to Jonathan! (1996)	I'm So Confused (1998)

Surrender to Jonathan! is an album by the American musician Jonathan Richman, released in 1996. Richman was the first musician signed to Neil Young's Vapor Records. Richman supported the album by touring with a full band.

== Production ==
Recorded in Southern California, the album was produced by Andy Paley. Richman recorded the album once he had enough songs, and during a break from his touring schedule; he does not record songs on a deadline. Some of the album's songs were inspired by Richman's divorce. Richman played an Epiphone Emperor guitar. Richman used organ and horns on "I Was Dancing in the Lesbian Bar" and "Not Just a 'Plus One' on the Guest List Anymore". "Egyptian Reggae" is a remake of an older Richman song.

== Critical reception ==
Professional ratings
Review scores
Source	Rating
AllMusic	3/5 stars
Calgary Herald	2/5 stars
The Encyclopedia of Popular Music	3/5 stars
Entertainment Weekly	B
MusicHound Rock: The Essential Album Guide	3.5/5 stars
(The New) Rolling Stone Album Guide	2.5/5 stars

The Chicago Tribune deemed the album "typically blithe" and "a thoroughly swinging dose of tuneful good cheer." The Vancouver Sun opined that "Richman concocts more odd choruses from things most of us couldn't say aloud, let alone sing." The Calgary Herald determined that Richman's "simple rock 'n' roll has become increasingly simplistic and his cute musings increasingly moronic."

The Globe and Mail noted that Richman has "managed to reach [age] 45 without sounding a single cynical note in his life." Stereo Review determined that the "songwriting here is more consistent than usual, bringing the usual half-classic/half-throwaway ratio up to at least 60/40." Trouser Press stated that "Surrender" "is one of the most touching songs Richman has ever written."

== Track listing ==
No.	Title	Length
1.	"Just Look at Me"
2.	"Not Just a 'Plus One' on the Guest List Anymore"
3.	"That Little Sleeper Car"
4.	"French Style"
5.	"Surrender"
6.	"I Was Dancing in the Lesbian Bar"
7.	"To Hide a Little Thought"
8.	"Egyptian Reggae"
9.	"When She Kisses Me"
10.	"Satisfy"
11.	"Rock 'n' Roll Drummer Straight from the Hospy-Tel"
12.	"My Little Girl's Got a Full Time Daddy Now"
13.	"Floatin'"
