= Kevin Gray (engineer) =

Kevin Gray is a mastering engineer, notable for mastering more than 100 top-ten albums, including works by artists such as The Grateful Dead, Billy Joel, and The Who. He has also worked on albums by the Beach Boys and Joan Baez, as well as vinyl editions of soundtracks, such as The Sopranos and Tron. Gray mastered the Grammy winners of the Best Dance Recording award two years in a row—for Madonna in 1999, and Cher in 2000.

Kevin Gray began his audio-mastering career at the age of 18. After working for various mastering houses for many decades—such as Artisan Sound Recorders, The Cutting System Inc., LRS, Future Disc Systems, and AcousTech Mastering—Gray launched his own mastering house called Cohearent Audio LLC, in 2010.
