= Beth Harrington =

American filmmaker and musician, born 1955

- Born: July 2, 1955 (age 71); Boston, Massachusetts, U.S.
- Education: Syracuse University; University of Massachusetts
- Occupations: Filmmaker and musician
- Years active: 1980s–present
- Notable work: The Winding Stream: The Carters, the Cashes and the Course of Country Music, Welcome to the Club: The Women of Rockabilly
- Website: bethharrington.com

Beth Harrington (born July 2, 1955 in Boston, Massachusetts) is an Emmy-winning, Grammy-nominated filmmaker based in Vancouver, Washington, specializing in documentary features. Her documentaries often explore American history, music and culture, including the Carter Family and Johnny Cash, and the history of women in rockabilly. In addition to her film work as a producer, director and writer, Harrington is also a singer and guitarist, and was a member of Jonathan Richman and the Modern Lovers from 1980 to 1983.

== Personal life ==
The daughter of an art teacher and an artist/advertising executive of Irish and Italian heritage, Harrington was born and grew up in greater Boston. She attended Catholic elementary and high school in suburban Boston, a subject she revisited in her film The Blinking Madonna and Other Miracles. She holds a bachelor's degree in Public Communications from Syracuse University and a master's degree in American Studies from the University of Massachusetts.

Harrington's husband, Andy Lockhart, is a volcanologist for the U.S Geological Survey who she met while filming the Nova program In the Path of A Killer Volcano.

== Career ==
=== Music ===
After volunteering at the pioneering progressive-rock radio station WBCN, she became involved in the Boston music scene as a member of such bands as the Awful Truth and Barry Marshall and the Rockin' Robins. She also did recording work with Willie "Loco" Alexander, Lenny Kaye, Andy Paley and Erik Lindgren, and sang on the soundtrack of the 1989 film Shag. She joined Jonathan Richman and the Modern Lovers in 1980, touring extensively with that group and singing on its 1983 album Jonathan Sings! She also played with Northwest-based band Spiricles from 2011 to 2017.

=== Film ===
Harrington's documentaries have been released theatrically, on streaming and on-demand platforms, and broadcast on public television, both as free-standing features and as episodes of such series as Nova and Frontline. They have been shown at such film festivals as SXSW, the Mill Valley Film Festival, the Hot Springs Documentary Film Festival, the Cleveland International Film Festival and the Nashville Film Festival.

In 1991, Harrington began a long association with Boston's flagship PBS station WGBH, where she worked as associate producer and line producer on various nationally broadcast documentaries, including episodes of Nova, Frontline and The AIDS Quarterly (later called Health Quarterly). She was a line producer for the Peabody Award-winning show Dating in the Age of AIDS, an episode of Health Quarterly, and associate producer for two national Emmy-nominated productions, In the Path of A Killer Volcano, a Nova episode, and the PBS special Apollo 13: To the Edge and Back.

After relocating to the Pacific Northwest in October 1996, Harrington became a frequent contributor to Oregon Public Broadcasting, working as a freelance filmmaker as well as doing development work on other projects for that station. Harrington's work for OPB includes producing episodes of the PBS series History Detectives and several specials, including Digital Television: A Cringely Crash Course, one of PBS's first High Definition productions. She has also been a producer/director and/or writer on several distance-learning programs for Annenberg Learning, including the photography series Essential Lens and the history series Bridging World History.

Harrington also won acclaim for her 1996 feature The Blinking Madonna and Other Miracles, a "creative nonfiction" film telling the story of a miracle Harrington may have witnessed through a combination of documentary footage and scripted scenes performed by actors and real-life participants. It aired on national public television and screened at numerous film festivals.

Harrington's 2001 independent production Welcome to the Club: The Women of Rockabilly, a documentary about the pioneering women of early rock 'n' roll, was broadcast nationally on public television stations, and was nominated for a Grammy in the category of Best Long Form Video.

In 2008, Harrington produced, directed and wrote Searching for York, which told the little-known history of an enslaved man who served as a valued member of the Lewis and Clark Expedition. Her 2009 production Kam Wah Chung told the tale of two Chinese men living in Eastern Oregon during the Gold Rush. These programs each received two Northwest Emmy nominations, in the categories of Best Historical/Cultural Program and Best Writing.

Two other programs produced, directed and written by Harrington—ZigZag: Real Stories, New Angles, an innovative 2004 environmental public affairs show and Beervana, a 2007 look at Oregon's beer culture and history, also received Northwest Emmy nominations, for Best Public Affairs Special and Best Historical/Cultural Program, respectively.

Harrington's documentary The Winding Stream: The Carters, the Cashes and the Course of Country Music tells the story of country music's influential Carter family, and includes one of Johnny Cash's last interviews. The Winding Stream premiered at 2014's SXSW Film Festival, and went on to appear at over 30 other festivals. It was released in theaters across North America, and later had its digital and DVD launch on Netflix, Amazon, iTunes, Vudu and other platforms, and was well-reviewed in a number of national publications, including Variety, Rolling Stone, and The Hollywood Reporter. Harrington was also co-producer of The Winding Stream's soundtrack album, released by Omnivore Recordings. In 2021, the New York Daily News named The Winding Stream No. 56 on a list of the 100 best documentaries of all time.

In 2019, Harrington's film Fort Vancouver, the story of the Hudson's Bay Company in the Pacific Northwest, won a Northwest Regional Emmy as Best Historical/Cultural Program. Her 2020 film Once Upon a Time in the Northwest: The Music of Federale also won a Northwest Emmy.

Harrington is currently developing several new projects, including developing her music-based scripted short The Musicianer, starring actress Grey DeLisle and Canadian musician Petunia, into a feature film. Another project, Beyond the Duplex Planet, is a feature-length documentary about artist David Greenberger and his work turning interviews with senior citizens into art. A third, Foremothers, features present-day portraits of trailblazing women of rock 'n' roll. Yet another, Our Mr. Matsura, is a historical non-fiction film about a Japanese photographer's unconventional work documenting the people of Washington state in the early 1900s. The project received development funding in April 2021 from the National Endowment for the Humanities.

== Other work ==
Harrington is active in various film and arts organizations, having served on the board of the Hollywood Theatre in Portland, Oregon, as well as the Oregon Media Production Association. She is currently a commissioner on the Vancouver, Washington, Culture, Arts and Heritage Commission.

Harrington is also a past president of Women in Film/New England and a former vice president of Women in Film/Seattle. She is a voting member of the National Academy of Recording Arts and Sciences. She has been a media instructor at Washington State University, Lewis & Clark College, Bunker Hill Community College, New England School of Photography, Boston Film/Video Foundation, the Northwest Film Center and the Olympia Film Society, as well as an artist-in-residence at the Vancouver School of Arts and Academics.

== Awards and nominations ==
Harrington's films have won and been nominated for multiple awards; a complete list can be found in the filmography section below. In addition to her individual films, Harrington has also been honored with the following awards for her overall career:

- I Migliori Award, Pirandello Lyceum, Dante Aligheri Society, Boston, 1986
- Artist Trust/Washington State Arts Commission Fellowship, 2001
- Artist Fellow, Playa Art and Science Residency Program, 2018
- Clark County Arts Commission Lifetime Achievement Award, 2019

== Filmography ==
Year	Film	Producerw	Director	Writer	Awards
1984	Countdown to Disaster	Associate producer		✓	Gold Award, National Educational Film Festival; American Film Festival Award
1985	Ave Maria	✓	✓	✓	Bronze Award, National Educational Film Festival; Society for Visual Anthropology Honoree; Best Documentary, Birmingham International Educational Film Festival; Massachusetts Community TV Award; Finalist, American Anthropological Film Festival
1986	Firepower	Associate producer		✓	Gold Award, Chicago International Film Festival
1990	Nova: Can the Elephant Be Saved?	Associate producer			
1991	The Rage for Democracy	Associate producer			
1991	The Moveable Feast	✓	✓	✓	Society for Visual Anthropology Award; National Educational Film Festival Award
1992	Dating in the Age of AIDS	Line producer			George Foster Peabody Award
1993	Frontline: The Health Care Gamble	Associate producer			
1993	Nova: In the Path of A Killer Volcano	Associate producer			National Emmy nomination
1994	Apollo 13: To the Edge and Back	Associate producer			National Emmy nomination Paris Adventure Film Award
1996	The Blinking Madonna & Other Miracles	✓	✓	✓	Best Documentary, Sinking Creek Film Festival; Award for Conceptual Originality, New England Film Festival; Best of Fest Critics' Award, Northampton Film Festival; Worldfest Houston, Gold Award for Experimental Comedy; Selection, Southern Circuit Tour of Independent Filmmakers
1998	Digital TV: A Cringley Crash Course	✓	✓	✓	
2001	The Aleutians: Cradle of the Storms	Co-producer	✓	✓	
2001	Welcome to the Club: The Women of Rockabilly	✓	✓	✓	Grammy nomination, Best Long Form Video; Award for Conceptual Originality, New England Film Festival; Best of Fest Critics' Award, Northampton Film Festival; Gold Award for Experimental Comedy, Worldfest Houston
2002	Oregon Art Beat: Pete Beeman's Simple Machines	✓	✓	✓	
2004	ZigZag: Real Stories, New Angles	Co-producer	✓	✓	Northwest Emmy nomination, Best Public Affairs Special; Special Achievement Award, Oregon APA
2005	Gates of the Arctic	Co-producer			
2006	History Detectives: Ernie Pyle’s Typewriter	✓	✓	✓	
2007	Beervana	✓	✓	✓	Northwest Emmy nomination, Best Historical/Cultural Program
2007	Oregon Art Beat: Carter Family III at the American Roots Music Fest	✓	✓	✓	
2008	Searching for York	✓	✓	✓	Northwest Emmy nominations, Best Historical/Cultural Program and Best Writing
2009	Kam Wah Chung	✓	✓	✓	Northwest Emmy nominations, Best Historical/Cultural Program and Best Writing
2011	Reed	✓	✓	✓	
2012	Oregon Art Beat: Allen Say, Illustrator and Author	✓	✓	✓	
2014	Essential Lens	✓	✓	✓	
2014	The Winding Stream: The Carters, the Cashes and the Course of Country Music	✓	✓	✓	Best Music Documentary, Cleveland International Film Festival; Best Film by a Female Director, Nashville Film Festival; Best Feature Documentary, Chicago International Music and Movie Festival; Audience Award, Best Feature Documentary, Woods Hole Film Festival; Jury Award, Best Feature Documentary, Santa Fe Independent Film Festival; Best Music, Boston Film Festival; Audience Award, Best Feature Documentary Northwest Filmmakers' Festival; Selection, Southern Circuit Tour of Independent Filmmakers; Selection, On Screen/In Person Independent Film Tour
2015	Oregon Art Beat: Kevin Irving of the Oregon Ballet Theater	✓	✓	✓	
2018	Fort Vancouver	✓	✓	✓	Northwest Emmy Award, Best Historical/Cultural Program Special
2019	The Musicianer	✓	✓	✓	Best Short, Rails to Reels Film Festival; Best Music Video, Director's Cut International Film Festival; Best Short, Blow-up International Arthouse Film Fest Chicago; Best Music Film, Franklin International Indie Film Festival
2020	Once Upon a Time in the Northwest: The Music of Federale	✓	✓	✓	Northwest Emmy Award, Arts & Entertainment - Long Form Content
In progress	Beyond the Duplex Planet	✓	✓	✓	
In progress	Our Mr. Matsura	✓	✓	✓	
