= It's Time For =

Studio album by Jonathan Richman and the Modern Lovers
- Released: 1986
- Recorded: 1985
- Genre: Rock
- Label: Upside
- Producer: Andy Paley

Jonathan Richman and the Modern Lovers chronology
Rockin' and Romance (1985)	It's Time For (1986)	Modern Lovers 88 (1987)

It's Time For is the sixth album by the American band Jonathan Richman and the Modern Lovers, released in 1986. It coincided with a Rhino Records rerelease campaign for the band's previous albums. They supported it with North American and UK tours.

== Production ==
Recorded in 1985, the album was produced by Andy Paley. Asa Brebner returned to play guitar during the recording sessions, which also included contributions from the singer Barrence Whitfield. Richman wanted a large crowd of friends in the studio, so that he could play off their reactions to the music; he also played saxophone on some of the tracks. "Corner Store" is about the decline of smaller retail businesses due to the encroachment of big box stores and malls. "Shirin and Fahrad" is a recounting of the Persian romantic tragedy. "Yo Jo Jo" is an instrumental. "Double Chocolate Malted" is a how-to on preparing the perfect malted.

== Critical reception ==
Professional ratings
Review scores
Source	Rating
All Music Guide to Rock	3/5 stars
The Boston Phoenix	2/4 stars
Robert Christgau	B−
The Encyclopedia of Popular Music	2/5 stars
The Great Rock Discography	5/10
MusicHound Rock: The Essential Album Guide	3/5 stars
Pittsburgh Post-Gazette	A−
The Rolling Stone Album Guide	2/5 stars
Spin Alternative Record Guide	5/10

The Chicago Tribune noted that Richman "has raised arrested development and emotional naivete to an art form". The Philadelphia Inquirer called the album "a first-rate rock record, one whose simplicity and spirit harks back to old rockabilly records of the '50s." The Chicago Sun-Times said that "Richman is a singer-songwriter who takes chances without calculation, one who creates sentiment by understatement."

The Derby Evening Telegraph labeled It's Time For "the sound of a true eccentric, if not a seriously deranged crackpot". The Pittsburgh Post-Gazette concluded, "The album has a spontaneity that is disarming." The St. Petersburg Times considered the songs "simple folks styles spiked with elements of '50s doo-wop and '60s surf." Robert Christgau noted the "arch nostalgia of this moderately gifted neoprimitive egomaniac".

== Track listing ==
No.	Title	Length
1.	"It's You"
2.	"Let's Take a Trip"
3.	"This Love of Mine"
4.	"Neon Sign"
5.	"Double Chocolate Malted"
6.	"Just About Seventeen"
7.	"Corner Store"
8.	"The Desert"
9.	"Yo Jo Jo"
10.	"When I Dance"
11.	"Shirin and Fahrad"
12.	"Ancient Long Ago"
