= Rockin' and Romance =

Studio album by Jonathan Richman and The Modern Lovers
- Released: 1985
- Recorded: 1984
- Genre: Rock and roll, romantic, doo-wop
- Length: 36:19
- Label: Rough Trade (UK), Twin/Tone (U.S.)
- Producer: Andy Paley

Jonathan Richman and The Modern Lovers chronology
Jonathan Sings! (1983)	Rockin' and Romance (1985)	It's Time For (1986)

Professional ratings
Review scores
Source	Rating
AllMusic	4/5 stars
Uncut	9/10

Rockin' and Romance is the fifth album by American rock band Jonathan Richman and the Modern Lovers, released in 1985 as part of a two-album deal for Richman with Geoff Travis's Rough Trade Records label in the UK. Originally planned for release in the U.S. by Sire Records, it was issued there by Twin/Tone Records.

== Reception ==
John Leland of Spin wrote, "On an album of absolutely no musical sophistication, Richman uses eight backup singers. Behind his lovably clumsy and tuneless singing, they harmonize on oohs, ahhs, and other exquisite nonsense syllables. The rest of the sound is Richman's cheaply recorded and sometimes out-of-tune acoustic guitar." Richie Unterberger praised the album on Allmusic, stating "while it is generally true that many of Richman's post-1980 albums are all but interchangeable, with their earnest naive cheerfulness, this stands as one of the best." Robert Christgau wrote in the Village Voice, "It's a thin line between ooh and ick, and when he starts saying bum for ass (butt, buns, behind, backside, rear end, tush, I'll even settle for bottom) you can figure the feybirds have flitted off with another album. I like Walter Johnson myself, but Jonathan should realize that maybe Vincent van Gogh deserved to be called an asshole."

== Track listing ==
All songs written by Jonathan Richman.

Side one

1. "The Beach" – 2:19
2. "My Jeans" – 3:17
3. "Down in Bermuda" – 3:04
4. "The U.F.O. Man" – 3:22
5. "I Must Be King" – 2:40
6. "Vincent van Gogh" – 2:25
7. "Walter Johnson" – 2:21

Side two

1. "I'm Just Beginning to Live" – 2:53
2. "The Fenway" – 2:30
3. "Chewing Gum Wrapper" – 3:21
4. "The Baltimores" – 3:01
5. "Up in the Sky Sometime" – 2:52
6. "Now Is Better Than Before" – 2:17

== Personnel ==
- Jonathan Richman – vocals, guitars
- Ellie Marshall – first female singer
- Debbie Edwards – additional female singer
- Jeanette Sartain – additional female singer
- Michael Guardabascio – male singer, drums
- Ned Claflin – male singer
- Tom Nelson – male singer
- Scot Woodland – male singer
- Andy Paley – male singer, drum solo on "I'm Just Beginning to Live", toy piano

Technical

- Andy Paley – producer
- Carol Fondé – cover photo
