= Back in Your Life (Jonathan Richman album) =

Studio album by Jonathan Richman and the Modern Lovers
- Released: February 1979
- Genre: Pop rock
- Length: 32:39
- Label: Beserkley
- Producers: Matthew King Kaufman, Glen Kolotkin, Kenny Laguna

Jonathan Richman and the Modern Lovers chronology
Rock 'n' Roll with the Modern Lovers (1977)	Back in Your Life (1979)	The Original Modern Lovers (1981)

Back in Your Life is the third album by American rock band Jonathan Richman and the Modern Lovers, released in February 1979 by Beserkley Records. Despite being credited to Richman and his backing band, the album only features the backing band on half of the album.

== Background ==
The album marks an experimental venture away from the Modern Lovers' typical rock sound, mostly owing to a new backing band accompanying Richman. The album ventures into genres like doo-wop and children's music.

In 2019, the album was reissued on silver-colored vinyl.

== Reception ==
Professional ratings
Review scores
Source	Rating
AllMusic	3.5/5 stars
Robert Christgau	B+
The Rolling Stone Album Guide	2.5/5 stars
Uncut	5/5 stars

Stephen Cook of AllMusic called the album "sweet, fun, and honest," noting Richman's "unbridled enthusiasm, wit, and crack songs."

Smash Hits wrote that "the world's cleverest clown opts for a cheapo '50s style sound this time out as he jaunts and quavers through this collection with his usual mixture of humour and touching honesty. It's distinctive alright." Robert Christgau wrote: "I'd say this is great kiddie music—lotsa innocence, lotsa animal songs, even a snot joke."

== Track listing ==
All songs written by Jonathan Richman, unless otherwise noted.

Side one

1. "Abdul and Cleopatra" – 3:18
2. "(She's Gonna) Respect Me" – 2:49
3. "Lover Please" (Billy Swan) – 1:58
4. "Affection" – 4:06
5. "Buzz Buzz Buzz" (John Gray, Robert Byrd) – 1:58
6. "Back in Your Life" – 2:14

Side two

1. "Party in the Woods Tonight" – 3:01
2. "My Love Is a Flower (Just Beginning to Bloom)" – 2:20
3. "I'm Nature's Mosquito" – 2:45
4. "Emaline" (Traditional; arranged by Jonathan Richman) – 2:07
5. "Lydia" (Lewis Lymon, Morgan Robinson) – 3:11
6. "I Hear You Calling Me" (music: Charles Marshall; lyrics: Harold Harford) – 2:52

2004 CD bonus tracks

13. "Oh Carol" (Chuck Berry) – 2:27
14. "Astral Plane" (Live) – 3:42
15. "Hospital" (Live) – 5:19
16. "Chapel of Love" (Jeff Barry, Ellie Greenwich, Phil Spector) – 2:43

== Personnel ==
Jonathan Richman and the Modern Lovers

- Jonathan Richman – vocals, guitar
- Leroy Radcliffe – guitar, vocals (tracks 1, 3–5, 8, 10–12)
- David Sharpe – drums, percussion, vocals (tracks 1, 3–5, 8, 10–12)
- Asa Brebner – bass guitar, vocals (tracks 1, 3–5, 8, 10–12)

Additional musicians

- Peter Skip Duelks – backing vocals (tracks 2, 6, 7, 9)
- Donald Gladstone – double bass (tracks 2, 6, 7, 9)
- Kenny Laguna – glockenspiel, backing vocals (tracks 2, 6, 7, 9)
- Andy Paley – guitar, backing vocals (tracks 2, 6, 7, 9)
- Steve Tracey – backing vocals (tracks 2, 6, 7, 9)

Technical

- Glen Kolotkin – producer, engineer
- Matthew King Kaufman – producer
- Kenny Laguna – producer
- Steve Kimball – mastering
- Flashing Neon – LP concept
- Linda Dennis – cover art
- Jonathan Richman – cover art
- Nina Port – art direction
