= The Modern Lovers =

American rock group

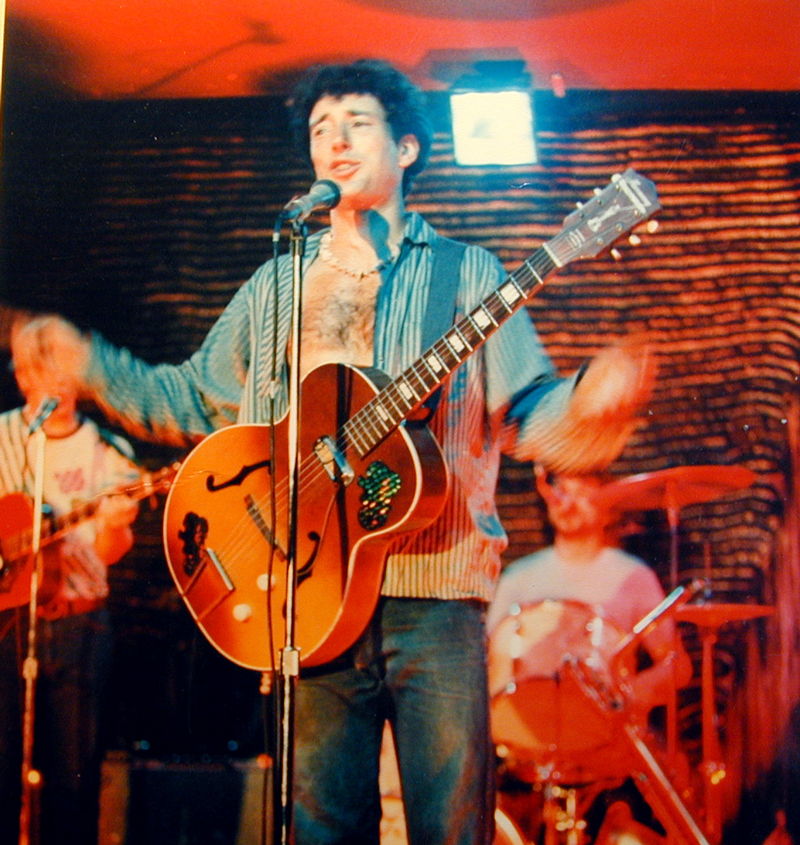
- Richman (center) performing with the band's second iteration in 1984.

Background information
- Also known as: Jonathan Richman and The Modern Lovers
- Origin: Natick, Massachusetts, U.S.
- Genres: Garage rock; proto-punk
- Years active: 1970–1974; 1976–1988
- Labels: Beserkley; Bomp!; Sire; Rough Trade; Twin/Tone; Virgin Music; Upside; Rounder; Demon
- Past members: Jonathan Richman; John Felice; David Robinson; Rolfe Anderson; Ernie Brooks; Jerry Harrison; Bob Turner; Leroy Radcliffe; Greg 'Curly' Keranen; D. Sharpe; Asa Brebner; Michael Guardabascio; Ellie Marshall; Beth Harrington; Andy Paley; Brennan Totten; Ken Forfia

The Modern Lovers were an American rock band formed in Natick, Massachusetts in 1970 by Jonathan Richman. The original band existed from 1970 to 1974 but their recordings were not released until 1976 or later. It featured Richman and bassist Ernie Brooks with drummer David Robinson (later of the Cars) and keyboardist Jerry Harrison (later of Talking Heads). The sound of the band owed a great deal to the influence of the Velvet Underground and the Stooges, and is now sometimes classified as "proto-punk". It pointed the way towards much of the punk rock, new wave, alternative and indie rock music of later decades. Their debut studio album, the eponymous The Modern Lovers (1976) contained idiosyncratic songs about dating awkwardness, growing up in Massachusetts, love of life, and the USA. The band would also release another studio album, The Original Modern Lovers (1981), and three live albums.

Later, between 1976 and 1988, Richman used the name "Modern Lovers" for a variety of backing bands, always billed as "Jonathan Richman and the Modern Lovers". These bands were quieter and featured more low-key, often near-childlike songs as Richman drew on folk-rock and other genres. This incarnation of the band released 7 studio albums and one live album. Of Richman's original bandmates, only Robinson was part of any of the other Modern Lovers incarnations, and he left the band's second incarnation that same year it formed. Notable members of the second incarnation include producer Andy Paley (who worked with acts such as Brian Wilson with The Beach Boys and Jerry Lee Lewis) and filmmaker Beth Harrington.

== The original Modern Lovers, 1970–1974 ==
Richman grew up in Natick, Massachusetts, a suburb of Boston, and began playing guitar and writing songs in his mid-teens, first performing solo in public in 1967. He became enamored of the Velvet Underground while he was still in high school, and after graduating in 1969, he moved to New York City where he became personally acquainted with the band and on one occasion opened the bill for them. Richman spent a couple of weeks sleeping on Velvets’ manager Steve Sesnick's sofa before moving into the Hotel Albert, a residence known for its poor conditions.

After nine months in New York, and a trip to Europe and Israel, Richman moved back to his native Boston. With his childhood friend, guitarist John Felice, he organized a band modeled after the Velvets. They quickly recruited drummer David Robinson and bass player Rolfe Anderson, and christened themselves "the Modern Lovers". They played their first date, supporting Andy Paley’s band the Sidewinders, in September 1970, barely a month after Richman's return. By this time their setlist already included such noted Richman songs as "Roadrunner", "She Cracked" and "Hospital". Richman's unique character was immediately apparent; he wore short hair and often performed wearing a jacket and tie, and frequently improvised new lyrics and monologues.

In early 1971 Anderson and Felice departed; they were replaced by Harvard students bassist Ernie Brooks, and keyboardist Jerry Harrison, completing the classic lineup of the Modern Lovers. This new configuration became very popular in the Boston area, and by the fall of 1971, enthusiastic word-of-mouth led to the Modern Lovers' first exposure to a major label when Stuart Love of Warner Bros. Records contacted them and organized the band's first multi-track session at Intermedia Studio in Boston. The demo produced from this session, and the group's live performances, generated more attention from the industry, including rave reviews from critic Lillian Roxon, and soon A&M Records was interested in the band as well.

In April 1972, the Modern Lovers traveled to Los Angeles where they held two demo sessions: the first was produced by the Velvet Underground's John Cale for Warner Bros. while the second was produced by Allan Mason for A&M. These sessions were later used on the band's debut album. While in California the band also performed live, and one gig at the Long Branch Saloon in Berkeley was later issued as a live album. Producer Kim Fowley courted the band, traveling to Boston to produce some poor-quality demos in June 1972. Felice rejoined the group for a few months after his graduation, and the band moved together to live in Cohasset, Massachusetts.

The Modern Lovers continued to be a popular live attraction, and on New Year's Eve 1972 supported the New York Dolls at the Mercer Arts Center on a bill which also included Suicide and Wayne County. Early in 1973 they were finally signed by Warner Brothers. However, before returning to the studio in Los Angeles to work with Cale, the group accepted an offer to play a residency at the Inverurie Hotel in Bermuda, owned by the family of a friend of Ernie Brooks. While there, Richman heard and became strongly influenced by the laid-back style of the local musicians, as documented in his later song "Monologue About Bermuda". There were also growing personality clashes among band members.

Although on the band's return Richman agreed to record his earlier songs, he was anxious to move in a different musical direction. He wanted to scrap all of the tracks they had recorded and start over with a mellower, more lyrical sound. The rest of the band, while not opposed to such a shift later, insisted that they record as they sounded now. However, the sessions with Cale in September 1973 also coincided with the death of their friend Gram Parsons (a former Harvard student, like Harrison and Brooks), and produced no usable recordings.

== Break-up and release of first album ==
Following the failure to complete a debut album, Warner Brothers withdrew their support for the Modern Lovers, and Robinson left the band. They continued to perform live for a few months with new drummer Bob Turner, but Richman was increasingly unwilling to perform his old (although still unreleased) songs such as "Roadrunner", and after a final disagreement between him and Harrison over musical style the band split up in February 1974.

Despite the original group's premature break-up, many of its members found considerable success elsewhere: founding member John Felice formed the Real Kids, Jerry Harrison later joined Talking Heads, David Robinson co-founded the Cars, and Ernie Brooks would later work with David Johansen, Arthur Russell, Elliott Murphy, and Gary Lucas.

Richman continued recording on his own, eventually moving to California in 1975 to begin working with Beserkley Records whose boss Matthew King Kaufman had met Richman when he worked with A&M. While Richman never returned to the Velvets-inspired sound of the original Modern Lovers, the demo recordings made with that group eventually surfaced in various formats. The first of these releases came in 1976 when Beserkley compiled a posthumous LP from the first two demo sessions produced by Cale and Mason; issued on Beserkley's Home of the Hits subsidiary, the album was simply titled The Modern Lovers and included celebrated tracks such as "Roadrunner", "She Cracked", and "Pablo Picasso".

Richman did not recognize this compilation as his "first album," preferring to recognize his debut as 1976's Jonathan Richman and the Modern Lovers, an album pursuing the lighter, softer direction he had in mind with a completely different band (the two collections were released within months of each other). However, The Modern Lovers was given an enthusiastic critical reception, with critic Ira Robbins hailing it as "one of the truly great art rock albums of all time", and it influenced numerous aspiring punk rock musicians on both sides of the Atlantic, including the Sex Pistols (who covered "Roadrunner" on The Great Rock 'n' Roll Swindle).

== Jonathan Richman and the Modern Lovers, 1976–1988 ==
In early 1976, Richman put together a new version of the Modern Lovers, with Leroy Radcliffe (guitar), Greg 'Curly' Keranen (bass) and the returning David Robinson (drums). Keranen had previously played with the Rubinoos, and Radcliffe with Woody's Truckstop. They recorded the album Jonathan Richman & The Modern Lovers (1976), but Robinson again left after Richman persisted in reducing the size and volume of his drum kit, and was replaced by D. Sharpe. This band recorded the album Rock 'n' Roll with the Modern Lovers (1977) and toured until Keranen left to go to college and was replaced by Asa Brebner, who played on the albums The Modern Lovers Live (1978) and Back in Your Life (1979). David "D." Sharpe died in 1987, aged 39.

In 1980 Richman again formed a new Modern Lovers, with Keranen, drummer Michael Guardabascio and backing singers Ellie Marshall and Beth Harrington. They recorded the album Jonathan Sings! in 1981/82, but it was not released until 1983. The group toured to support the album, often regarded as one of Richman's best, but split up after Keranen again left in 1984.

The final incarnation of the Modern Lovers, with Andy Paley, Brennan Totten and (initially) Asa Brebner again, toured and recorded between 1985 and 1988. Richman finally retired the Modern Lovers name after the album Modern Lovers 88.

Richman continues to perform, often solo and preferring acoustic instruments, and currently has no plans to undertake another group like his original band. A tribute album consisting primarily of Modern Lovers songs, If I Were a Richman: a Tribute to the Music of Jonathan Richman, was released by Wampus Multimedia in 2001. Asa Brebner died in 2019, aged 65.

== Influence ==
The Modern Lovers had significant influence on the then-burgeoning punk rock and later new wave and indie musical styles, as viewed in the feature-length 2015 documentary Danny Says.

John Cale, Iggy Pop and David Bowie have all covered "Pablo Picasso"; it was also covered by Los Angeles-area rock band Burning Sensations for the soundtrack of the 1984 Alex Cox film Repo Man; additionally the song was covered by the English post-punk band Television Personalities on their album Don't Cry Baby, It's Only a Movie.

The Sex Pistols covered "Roadrunner" on The Great Rock 'n' Roll Swindle. Joan Jett sang "Roadrunner" on her cover album, The Hit List. In 2009 Titus Andronicus covered "Roadrunner" on its EP The Innocents Abroad – Live in London 23/02/09; this recording was subsequently included on the fan compilation Feats of Strength. Additional covers of "Roadrunner" include those by Wire and Richman's labelmates the Greg Kihn Band.

Echo & the Bunnymen covered "She Cracked" live on Crystal Days in 1985, although with some altered lyrics. Siouxsie and the Banshees released "She Cracked" as the extra b-side of "This Wheel's on Fire" 1987 double-pack 7-inch, collected on Downside Up. Additionally, American grunge band Seaweed covered "She Cracked" on the John Peel Sub-Pop Sessions album, in 1994.

Galaxie 500 covered "Don't Let Our Youth Go to Waste" on their debut album, Today in 1987. The song became a staple of their live performances until they disbanded in 1991.

== Line-up ==
- Jonathan Richman – vocals, guitar (1970–1974, 1976–1988)
- David Robinson – drums, backing vocals (1970–1973, 1976)
- John Felice – guitar (1970–1971)
- Rolfe Anderson – bass (1970–1971)
- Ernie Brooks – bass, backing vocals (1971–1974)
- Jerry Harrison – piano, organ, backing vocals (1971–1974)
- Bob Turner – drums (1973–1974)
- Leroy Radcliffe – guitar, backing vocals (1976–1979)
- Greg 'Curly' Keranen – bass, backing vocals (1976–1977, 1980–1984)
- Denotra 'D' Sharpe – drums, backing vocals (1976–1979)
- Asa Brebner – bass, backing vocals (1977–1979), guitar (1985–1986)
- Andy Paley – guitar, backing vocals (1979, 1985–1986; died 2024), keyboards, drums (1984–1985)
- Steve Tracey – backing vocals (1979)
- Michael Guardabascio – drums (1980–1986)
- Ellie Marshall – backing vocals (1980–1986)
- Beth Harrington – backing vocals (1980–1984)
- Ken Forfia – keyboards (1982–1984)
- Ned Claflin – backing vocals, accordion (1984–1986)
- Brennan Totten – guitar, backing vocals (1986–1988)
- Johnny Avila – drums, backing vocals (1986–1988)

== Discography ==
=== Studio albums ===
List of albums, with selected chart positions
Title	Album details	Peak chart positions		
Title	Album details	US Sales	NZ	UK
The Modern Lovers
The Modern Lovers	Released: August 1976; Label: Beserkley	—	—	—
The Original Modern Lovers	Released: October 1981; Label: Mohawk	—	—	—
Jonathan Richman and the Modern Lovers
Jonathan Richman & The Modern Lovers	Released: July 1976; Label: Beserkley	—	—	—
Rock 'n' Roll with the Modern Lovers	Released: August 1977; Label: Beserkley	—	37	50
Back in Your Life	Released: February 1979; Label: Beserkley	—	—	—
Jonathan Sings!	Released: 1983; Label: Sire Records	—	—	—
Rockin' and Romance	Released: 1985; Label: Twin/Tone	—	—	—
It's Time For	Released: 1986; Label: Upside Records	—	—	—
Modern Lovers 88	Released: 1987; Label: Rounder Records	77	—	—

=== Live albums ===
List of albums, with selected chart positions
Title	Album details	Peak chart positions
Title	Album details	SWE
The Modern Lovers
Live at the Longbranch Saloon	Released: 1992; Label: Fan Club	—
Precise Modern Lovers Order	Released: 1994; Label: Rounder Records	—
96 Tears	Released: 2010; Label: Vinyl Lovers	—
Jonathan Richman and the Modern Lovers
Modern Lovers Live	Released: 1977; Label: Beserkley	31

=== Singles ===
All singles are credited to Jonathan Richman and the Modern Lovers unless otherwise noted.

List of singles, with selected chart positions
Title	Year	Peak chart positions							Label and catalog number	Album
Title	Year	AUT	BEL (Fl.)	GER	NLD	NZ	SWI	UK	Label and catalog number	Album
"New England" b/w "Here Come The Martian Martians"	1976	—	—	—	—	—	—	—	Beserkley (B-5743)	Jonathan Richman and the Modern Lovers
"Roadrunner (Once)" (by Jonathan Richman) b/w "Roadrunner (Twice)" (by The Modern Lovers)	1977	—	26	—	—	—	—	11	Beserkley (BZZ 1)	The Modern Lovers
"Egyptian Reggae" b/w "Roller Coaster by the Sea"	1977	15	2	13	2	22	8	5	Beserkley (BZZ 2)	Rock 'n' Roll with the Modern Lovers
"The Morning of Our Lives" b/w "Roadrunner (Thrice)"	1978	—	—	—	—	—	—	29	Beserkley (BZZ 7)	Non-album single
"Abdul & Cleopatra" b/w "Oh Carol"	1978	—	—	—	—	—	—	—	Beserkley (BZZ 19)	Back in Your Life
"Buzz Buzz Buzz" b/w "Hospital (Live)"	1978	—	—	—	—	—	—	—	Beserkley (BZZ 25)	Back in Your Life
"Lydia" b/w "Important In Your Life" (from Jonathan Richman and the Modern Lovers)	1979	—	—	—	—	—	—	—	Beserkley (BZZ 28)	Back in Your Life
"That Summer Feeling" b/w "This Kind of Music"	1984	—	—	—	—	—	—	—	Rough Trade (RT 152)	Jonathan Sings!
"I'm Just Beginning To Live" b/w "Circle I" (from Modern Lovers 88)	1985	—	—	—	—	—	—	—	Rough Trade (RT 154)	Rockin' and Romance
