= Mark Doyon =

American novelist and recording artist

Mark W. Doyon (born October 4, 1962) is an American author, recording artist, and creative director. He has led the indie rock bands Arms of Kismet, Wampeters and Waterslide, and produced tribute albums to Jonathan Richman, Lou Reed and Warren Zevon. He is the founder and principal of the record label and media company Wampus Multimedia.

== Life and career ==
He was born in Washington, D.C., and grew up in northern Virginia. He began recording himself using double tracking by the age of 14, and formed high school bands playing the music of British bands such as the Beatles, the Who and the Clash.

He studied American literature at The College of William & Mary, graduating in 1985, before forming the rock band Wampeters, with Eamon Loftus and Scott Goodrick, in 1987. The band took its name from a fictional religious concept in the Kurt Vonnegut novel Cat's Cradle, and released seven albums between 1987 and 1999. He then set up Arms of Kismet as a solo project. Described as "indie guitar rock with a slight psychedelic side," Arms of Kismet has released six albums—Eponymous (2004), Cutting Room Rug (2005), and Play for Affection (2010), all recorded with engineer Jon Astley, and The Helium Age (2016), Ballast and Bromides (2018), and Unexpected Guests (2026). Cutting Room Rug was described at Allmusic.com as "not recommended for bipolar people." Play for Affection won the title of Independent Album Of The Year at the Daily Vault review site, where it was described as "playful, literate, melodic, idiosyncratic, exotically memorable and memorably exotic." The album featured vocals, piano, organ, loops, guitar and bass by Doyon, with Evan Pollack on drums and percussion.

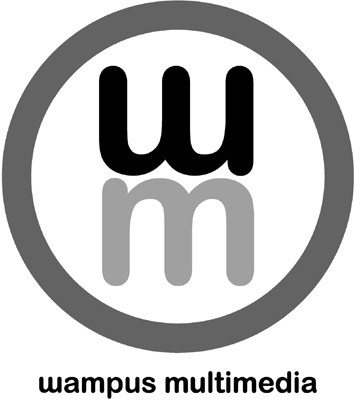
Logo of Wampus Multimedia

In 1989 he launched a literary magazine, Friction Quasi-Quarterly, which published 18 issues until 1994. A collection of his own short stories, Bonneville Stories, was published by Pocol Press in 2001. His tragicomic debut novel, Deep Fried, was published by Wampus in 2024.

In 2002 he founded the independent media company Wampus Multimedia, which has published the rock and folk recordings of his own bands and other artists, including tvfordogs, Amateur God, Cafebar 401, and Kowtow Popof. Doyon has also produced three various artists tribute albums: If I Were a Richman: a Tribute to the Music of Jonathan Richman (2001), After Hours: a Tribute to the Music of Lou Reed (2003), and Hurry Home Early: the Songs of Warren Zevon (2005). In 2005, Wampus established the reissue imprint Foldback Records. Doyon has also produced records for folk songwriters Casey Abrams, Alice Despard and Johnny J. Blair, and for other artists using the pseudonym "Mitch Renault."

Between 1989 and 2002 he worked as a communications and marketing director for the Healthcare Distribution Management Association (HDMA), the National Association of Rehabilitation Facilities (NARF), and the National Rehabilitation Association (NRA). In 2008 he was named a Vice President of BoardSource, an organization that supports non-profit organizations. He received a master's degree in arts administration from Shenandoah University in 2009.

== Discography ==
=== Wampeters ===
- Screen Test (1987)
- Folk Medicine (1989)
- Pagan's Nest (1990)
- Bloodline (1993)
- Look What's Left (1994)
- Hey Judas (1997)
- Murder Your Darlings (1999)

=== Arms of Kismet ===
- Eponymous (2004)
- Cutting Room Rug (2005)
- Play for Affection (2010)
- The Helium Age (2016)
- Ballast and Bromides (2018)
- Unexpected Guests (2026)

=== Waterslide ===
- Lincoln Signal (2012)
- Flicker EP (2019)
- Ray EP (2022)

=== As executive producer ===
- If I Were a Richman: a Tribute to the Music of Jonathan Richman (2001)
- After Hours: a Tribute to the Music of Lou Reed (2003)
- Hurry Home Early: the Songs of Warren Zevon (2005)
- Modern Rock & Modern Folk (2007)
- Poetic Licensing (2010)

=== As producer ===
- Casey Abrams, Like a Mirror (2005)
- Simone Stevens and Jordan Zevon, Warm Rain (2005)
- Johnny J Blair, Treadmarks (2005)
- Alice Despard, Vessel (2005)
- Rance Wolfrey, EP (2008)

== Bibliography ==
- Bonneville Stories (ISBN 1-929763-09-3) (2001, ebook 2007, audiobook 2011)
- Deep Fried (ISBN 979-8-9850353-4-6) (2024)
