= Jonathan Sings! =

Studio album by Jonathan Richman and the Modern Lovers
- Released: 1983
- Recorded: 1983
- Genre: Rock and roll
- Length: 34:10
- Label: Sire/Warner Bros/Blue Horizon
- Producer: Peter Bernstein

Jonathan Richman and the Modern Lovers chronology
| The Original Modern Lovers (1981) | Jonathan Sings! (1983) | Rockin' and Romance (1985) |

Professional ratings
Review scores
| Source | Rating |
|---|---|
| AllMusic | 3.5/5 stars |
| Robert Christgau | A |
| Sounds | 5/5 stars |

Jonathan Sings! is the fourth album by American rock band Jonathan Richman and the Modern Lovers, released in 1983 by Sire Records.

== Reception ==
Robert Palmer of The New York Times praised the album, writing that "the unironic, clear-sighted innocence of Mr. Richman's best lyrics and his frail singing could be stratagems to disarm his audience...Where Mr. Richman's previous songs barely got him into his teens, his latest lyrics have taken something like an adult perspective. 'That Summer Feeling' warns against nostalgia in rhymes worthy of Ogden Nash, and in 'The Neighbors' he turns out to be married. The tunes on Jonathan Sings! are as understated - as anti-rock - as Mr. Richman recent albums, but all of a sudden he seems to have grown up."

Robert Christgau gave the album an "A" rating and placed it at #9 on his Dean's List for the best albums of the year. Decades later, he praised the album again, writing that "the small joys that populate 1983’s willfully minor Jonathan Sings!, with 'That Summer Feeling' merely the standout, aspire to a quiet spiritual sustenance with few parallels in pop music or anywhere else."

The album placed number 8 in The Village Voice's annual Pazz & Jop critics' poll of 1984. NME also ranked it number 19 among the "Albums of the Year" for 1984.

== Track listing ==
All songs written by Jonathan Richman.

Side one

1. "That Summer Feeling" – 3:56
2. "This Kind of Music" – 2:11
3. "The Neighbors" – 3:20
4. "Somebody to Hold Me" – 3:20
5. "Those Conga Drums" – 3:05

Side two

1. "Stop This Car" – 1:49
2. "Not Yet Three" – 2:42
3. "Give Paris One More Chance" – 2:55
4. "You're the One for Me" – 3:19
5. "When I'm Walking" – 3:03

1993 CD bonus track

11. "The Tag Game" – 4:30
- Denoted as "previously released in the U.K. only"

Note: Richman revisited "That Summer Feeling" on 1992's I, Jonathan, with a somewhat longer version of the song.

== Personnel ==
- Jonathan Richman – vocals, guitar

The Modern Lovers

- Ken Forfia – keyboards
- Michael Guardabascio – drums
- Beth Harrington – backing vocals
- Greg Keranen – bass
- Ellie Marshall – backing vocals

Technical

- Peter Bernstein – producer
- Josef Marc – additional production
- Larry Hinds – engineer
- Mark Linett – mixing
- Joe McEwen – reissue co-producer
- Jim Bessman – reissue co-producer, liner notes
- Lee Herschberg – digital remastering
- Molly Reeve-Morrison – project coordination
- Billy Sullivan – cover painting
- Jackie Sallow – back cover photograph
- Jeri McManus – design
- Tom Recchian – front cover lettering
