= Greg "Curly" Keranen =

American musician

Greg 'Curly' Keranen is an American bassist and guitarist, who sometimes performs under the stage name, João Dilberto. He died in May 2025.

Keranen was a founding member of the band The Rubinoos who made their first recordings for Beserkley Records in 1974, during which time, they backed Jonathan Richman on his first recordings for the label.

In 1976, Keranen joined "Jonathan Richman and The Modern Lovers", and continued to record with Richman, periodically, until 2004.

In 1985, after a European tour with Richman, Keranen met Irish singer, Mary Coughlan and played on her first LP, Tired and Emotional, which sold over 100,000 copies.

Interviews with Keranen are featured in Tim Mitchell's 1999 biography, There's Something About Jonathan: Jonathan Richman and the Modern Lovers

In 2021, Keranen joined with JamForFreedom.com in organizing musicians in resistance to US COVID-19 mandates:

Musicians for Liberty (SF/Monterey Bay, CA, USA)
