= Greg Kihn Again =

Studio album by Greg Kihn
- Released: 1977
- Recorded: 1977
- Studio: CBS, San Francisco
- Genre: Rock
- Length: 38:41
- Label: Beserkley
- Producer: Matthew King Kaufman, Glen Kolotkin

Greg Kihn chronology
Greg Kihn (1976)	Greg Kihn Again (1977)	Next of Kihn (1978)

Singles from Greg Kihn Again
- 1. "For You" Released: 1977; 2. "Love's Made a Fool of You" Released: 1977; 3. "Madison Avenue" Released: 1977

Professional ratings
Review scores
Source	Rating
AllMusic	4.5/5 stars
The Rolling Stone Album Guide	3/5 stars

Greg Kihn Again is the second studio album by American singer-songwriter Greg Kihn. It was released by Beserkley in 1977.

== Track listing ==
All songs written by Greg Kihn, unless otherwise noted.

No.	Title	Writer(s)	Length
1.	"Love's Made a Fool of You"	Buddy Holly, Bob Montgomery	2:44
2.	"Island"		2:38
3.	"Last of Me"	Kihn, Rose Bimler	4:48
4.	"Real Big Man"		5:03
5.	"Politics"		4:20
6.	"Hurt So Bad"		4:45
7.	"For You"	Bruce Springsteen	3:57
8.	"If You Be My Love"		2:50
9.	"Madison Avenue"	Kihn, Bimler	4:49
10.	"Untie My Hands"	Steve Wright	3:16

== Personnel ==
- Greg Kihn – guitar, harmonica, vocals
- Dave Carpender – guitar, vocals
- Larry Lynch – drums, vocals
- Steve Wright – bass, vocals

Additional personnel

- Robbie Dunbar – guitar on "For You"

Production

- Producers: Matthew King Kaufman, Glen Kolotkin
- "Untie My Hands" arranged by Dave Carpender, Larry Lynch, Steve Wright
