= With the Naked Eye =

Studio album by the Greg Kihn Band
- Released: 1979
- Recorded: 1978–1979
- Studio: Wally Heider, San Francisco
- Genre: Pop, rock
- Length: 30:05
- Label: Beserkley
- Producer: Matthew King Kaufman, Glen Koloktin, Kenny Laguna

The Greg Kihn Band chronology
Next of Kihn (1978)	With the Naked Eye (1979)	Glass House Rock (1980)

With the Naked Eye is an album by the American band the Greg Kihn Band, released in 1979. It was produced by Matthew King Kaufman, Glen Koloktin, and Kenny Laguna.

The album contains a cover of the Bruce Springsteen song "Rendezvous", as well as a cover of Jonathan Richman's "Roadrunner".

== Critical reception ==
Professional ratings
Review scores
Source	Rating
AllMusic	3/5 stars
The Muncie Star	C−
The Rolling Stone Album Guide	3/5 stars

The Globe and Mail wrote: "One needling pop song follows another. None of them has much to say, but still the band has a pleasant way of putting the vacuum across."

== Track listing ==
No.	Title	Writer(s)	Length
1.	"Rendezvous"	Bruce Springsteen	2:27
2.	"In the Naked Eye"	Greg Kihn	3:16
3.	"Getting Away with Murder"	Kihn	2:46
4.	"Moulin Rouge"	Kihn, Steve Wright	3:20
5.	"Beside Myself"	Kihn, Dave Carpender, Wright	2:24
6.	"Roadrunner"	Jonathan Richman	2:56
7.	"Another Lonely Saturday Night"	Kihn, Kenny Laguna	2:55
8.	"Can't Have the Highs (Without the Lows)"	Larry Lynch	3:57
9.	"Fallen Idol"	Kihn	6:01

== Personnel ==
The Greg Kihn Band

- Greg Kihn - lead vocals (all but 8), rhythm guitar
- Dave Carpender - lead guitar, backing vocals
- Steve Wright - bass, backing vocals
- Larry Lynch - drums, backing and lead (8) vocals

Production

- Producers: Matthew King Kaufman, Glen Koloktin, Kenny Laguna
- Engineer: Glen Kolotkin, Jeffrey Norman
- Mastering: George Horn
- Art direction: Niva Port, Reva Fredrickson
- Artwork/Design: Hugh Brown
- Logistics: Brian Murray, Gerry Blumenthal
