= Glass House Rock =

Studio album by The Greg Kihn Band
- Released: 1980
- Recorded: 1980
- Genre: Rock
- Length: 35:22
- Label: Beserkley
- Producer: Matthew King Kaufman, The Greg Kihn Band

The Greg Kihn Band chronology
With the Naked Eye (1979)	Glass House Rock (1980)	RocKihnRoll (1981)

Singles from Glass House Rock
- 1. "Small Change" Released: 1980

Glass House Rock is the fifth studio album by Greg Kihn and the second album to be released as The Greg Kihn Band in 1980.

Glass House Rock broke new ground for The Greg Kihn Band and is notable for its hard rock sound. The song "Castaway" uses fast-paced finger-play in the vein of Love's "7 and 7 Is" with underlapping guitar tracks.

The album has noticeably more collaborative compositions and sharing of vocal duties, featuring lead vocals by both Larry Lynch and Steve Wright on the songs "The Man Who Shot Liberty Valance" and "Night After Night" respectively. Lynch and Wright also provided lead vocals alongside Kihn for "The Only Dance There Is" as well as a cover version of The Yardbirds' "For Your Love".

"For Your Love" was recorded in front of a live audience at a sound check at the Keystone Berkeley, California.

== Track listing ==
No.	Title	Writer(s)	Length
1.	"Castaway"	Greg Kihn, Rose Bimler	2:47
2.	"Desire Me"	Kihn, Victor Roccki	4:06
3.	"Anna Belle Lee"	Kihn	3:43
4.	"Things to Come"	Kihn, Steve Wright	3:11
5.	"Small Change"	Kihn	3:05
6.	"The Only Dance There Is"	Kihn, Wright	3:50
7.	"The Man Who Shot Liberty Valance"	Burt Bacharach, Hal David	3:05
8.	"Serenade Her"	Kihn	3:14
9.	"Night After Night"	Wright, Alexander, Kihn	3:53
10.	"For Your Love"	Graham Gouldman	4:28

== Personnel ==
The Greg Kihn Band

- Greg Kihn - lead vocals (1–6, 8), rhythm guitar
- Dave Carpender - lead guitar, backing vocals
- Steve Wright - bass, backing and lead (9, 10) vocals
- Larry Lynch - drums, backing and lead (7, 10) vocals

Additional personnel

- Gary Phillips - keyboards

== Production ==
- Producer: Matthew King Kaufman
- Logistics: Brian Murray
