= The Modern Lovers (album) =

Studio album by the Modern Lovers
- Released: June 1976
- Recorded: September 1971 and April 1972; October 1973 (bonus tracks only)
- Studios: Intermedia Sound (Boston, Massachusetts); A&M (Hollywood, California); Gold Star (Hollywood, California) (bonus tracks)
- Genres: Proto-punk; garage rock; art rock
- Length: 34:51 (original release); 44:06 (1989 CD reissue); 62:13 (2003 CD reissue)
- Label: Beserkley
- Producers: Robert Appère, John Cale, Allan Mason

The Modern Lovers chronology
The Modern Lovers (1976)	The Original Modern Lovers (1981)

Jonathan Richman chronology
Jonathan Richman and the Modern Lovers (1976)	The Modern Lovers (1976)	Rock 'n' Roll with the Modern Lovers (1977)

Singles from The Modern Lovers
- 1. "Roadrunner" Released: October 1976

1989 CD reissue

The Modern Lovers is the debut studio album by American rock band the Modern Lovers. It was released on Beserkley Records in 1976, though the original tracks had been recorded in 1971 and 1972. Six of the original tracks were produced by John Cale. The album pointed towards alternative music genres such as punk rock, new wave and indie rock.

The album has been featured three times on Rolling Stone magazine's list of the 500 greatest albums of all time, and was included in Robert Dimery's book 1001 Albums You Must Hear Before You Die.

== Background ==
The Modern Lovers were formed in 1970 by teenage singer, songwriter, and guitarist Jonathan Richman. In early 1971, the band's membership was settled as Richman, Jerry Harrison (keyboards), Ernie Brooks (bass) and David Robinson (drums), with Richman's friend and original band member John Felice joining them occasionally as his school commitments allowed. By the autumn of 1971, through their live performances in Boston and New York, they had begun to attract the attention of several record company A&R men, including Stuart Love at Warner Brothers, and Allan Mason and Matthew Kaufman at A&M. The band made their first recordings for Warner Brothers at the Intermedia Studios in Boston in late 1971; these included the version of "Hospital" which was later to feature on the album.

In April 1972, the Modern Lovers traveled to Los Angeles where they held two demo sessions; the first was produced for Warner Brothers by John Cale, formerly of the Velvet Underground, while the second was produced by Allan Mason and Robert Appère for A&M. Both sets of sessions yielded tracks which, although originally recorded as demos, eventually found their way onto the album. The Cale sessions produced "Roadrunner", "Astral Plane", "Old World", "Pablo Picasso", "She Cracked" and "Someone I Care About". The A&M sessions yielded "Girl Friend", "Modern World" and "Dignified and Old" (which, although not included on the original LP, was included on later CD reissues).

However, the band were initially undecided over which record company to sign for, returned to Boston, and also did some recordings organised by Kim Fowley and produced by Stuart "Dinky" Dawson. Eventually, in early 1973, they signed with Warner Brothers and agreed that John Cale should produce their debut album. In the meantime, they undertook a short residency at a hotel in Bermuda. Returning to California in the summer to work with Cale, it became apparent both that there were personality clashes between some of the band members, and that Richman now wanted to take a different approach to his songs - much more mellow and easy-paced rather than the earlier aggressive hard rock. The sessions with Cale were terminated before any new recordings were completed. Warner Brothers then engaged Kim Fowley to work with the band, but by this time Richman refused to perform some of his most popular earlier songs live. The band were also affected by the death during the sessions of their friend Gram Parsons: on the day before Parsons' death, he and Richman had played miniature golf and discussed recording together. The sessions with Fowley were aborted, although two tracks, "I'm Straight" and the original recording of "Government Center", and possibly others, were later issued on CD versions of The Modern Lovers. Warner Brothers withdrew support from the band, and, early in 1974, the original Modern Lovers split up.

== Release ==
In late 1974, Richman signed as a solo artist with Matthew "King" Kaufman's new label, "Home of the Hits", soon to be renamed Beserkley Records, and recorded four tracks with backing by the bands Earth Quake and The Rubinoos, including new versions of both "Roadrunner" and "Government Center". These tracks were first issued as singles, and then on an album Beserkley Chartbusters Vol.1 in 1975. In 1976, with a new line-up of the Modern Lovers, Richman began recording what he went on to regard as his debut album, Jonathan Richman and the Modern Lovers.

However, in the meantime, Kaufman also put together the album The Modern Lovers from remixed versions of the tracks recorded four or more years earlier for Warner Brothers and A&M, and released it in June 1976. "Hospital" was credited as being "donated by Jerry Harrison" because he possessed the original 1971 session tapes.

=== Bonus tracks ===
The 1986 Beserkley reissue of the album added "I'm Straight" from the 1973 Fowley sessions. The 1989 compact disc reissue on Rhino Records added "Government Center", also from the Fowley sessions, and "Dignified and Old" from the 1972 A&M demo recordings. Kaufman was credited as producer of "I'm Straight" and "Government Center" which were originally issued on Warners' Troublemakers compilation in 1980.

Further bonus tracks were added on a 2003 remastered reissue on Sanctuary Records: "I Wanna Sleep in Your Arms" and "Dance With Me" (recorded at the 1973 and 1972 demos with Fowley, respectively); and alternative versions of "Roadrunner", "Someone I Care About" and "Modern World" (the first two being from the 1971 Intermedia sessions in Boston, and the last one from the 1972 Fowley demos). This 17-track version of the album was released in the US for the first time on Castle Records in 2007.

== Critical reception ==
Professional ratings
Review scores
Source	Rating
AllMusic	5/5 stars
Blender	5/5 stars
Christgau's Record Guide	A
Encyclopedia of Popular Music	5/5 stars
Pitchfork	9.2/10
PopMatters	10/10
Q	5/5 stars
The Rolling Stone Album Guide	5/5 stars
Select	5/5
Spin Alternative Record Guide	10/10

The Modern Lovers was immediately given an enthusiastic critical reception, with critic Ira Robbins of Trouser Press hailing it as "one of the truly great art rock albums of all time". Robert Christgau of The Village Voice felt that Jonathan Richman was deserving of his "critics' darling" status and stated that "by cutting through the vaguely protesty ambience of so-called rock culture he opens the way for a worldliness that is specific, realistic, and genuinely critical."

In a retrospective write-up for AllMusic, Stephen Thomas Erlewine states that "the combination of musical simplicity, driving rock & roll, and gawky emotional confessions makes The Modern Lovers one of the most startling proto-punk records—it strips rock & roll to its core and establishes the rock tradition of the geeky, awkward social outcast venting his frustrations."

== Legacy ==
The Modern Lovers influenced numerous aspiring punk rock musicians on both sides of the Atlantic, including the Sex Pistols, whose early cover of "Roadrunner" was placed on The Great Rock 'n' Roll Swindle. In the UK, the versions of "Roadrunner" produced by Cale and Kaufman were released as two sides of a single, which became a chart hit in 1977.

In 2003, the album was ranked number 381 on Rolling Stone magazine's list of the 500 greatest albums of all time, 382 in 2012, and 288 in 2020.

In 2006, the album was included in Robert Dimery's 1001 Albums You Must Hear Before You Die.

== Track listing ==
All songs written by Jonathan Richman, except where noted.

=== Original LP ===
Side 1
No.	Title	Length
1.	"Roadrunner"	4:04
2.	"Astral Plane"	3:00
3.	"Old World"	4:00
4.	"Pablo Picasso"	4:15

Side 2
No.	Title	Length
1.	"She Cracked"	2:53
2.	"Hospital"	5:31
3.	"Someone I Care About"	3:37
4.	"Girl Friend"	3:51
5.	"Modern World"	3:40
Total length:		34:51

1986 Rhino reissue bonus tracks
No.	Title	Length
1.	"I'm Straight" (Fowley sessions, October 1973)	4:18
2.	"Dignified & Old" (A&M sessions, April 1972)	2:29
3.	"Government Center" (Fowley sessions, October 1973)	2:03
Total length:		41:38

2003 Castle reissue bonus tracks
No.	Title	Writer(s)	Length
1.	"Dignified & Old" (A&M sessions, April 1972)		2:29
2.	"I'm Straight" (Fowley sessions, October 1973)		4:18
3.	"Government Center" (Fowley sessions, October 1973)		2:03
4.	"I Wanna Sleep in Your Arms" (Fowley sessions, October 1973)	Richman, James Osterberg	2:32
5.	"Dance With Me" (Fowley sessions, October 1973)		4:26
6.	"Someone I Care About (Alternative Version)" (September 1971)		2:58
7.	"Modern World (Alternative Version)" (Fowley demo, 1972)		3:16
8.	"Roadrunner (Alternative Version)" (September 1971)		4:55
Total length:			61:48

*Previously released on Troublemakers (1980)
**Previously released on The Original Modern Lovers (1981)

== Personnel ==
The Modern Lovers

- Ernie Brooks – bass guitar, background vocals
- Jerry Harrison – piano, organ, background vocals, track 6 musical director
- Jonathan Richman – vocals, guitars
- David Robinson – drums, background vocals

Technical

- John Cale – producer (tracks 1–5, 7)
- Robert Appère – co-engineer (tracks 8–9, "Dignified & Old")
- Allan Mason – co-engineer (tracks 8–9, "Dignified & Old")
- Gary Phillips – remixing
- Matthew King Kaufman – remixing, compilation
- Glen Kolotkin – remixing
- Jim Blodgett – LP co-ordination
- T. Lubin – LP assistance
- George Horn – mastering
- Kim Fowley – producer ("I'm Straight", "Government Center", "I Wanna Sleep in Your Arms", "Dance with Me" and alternate versions)
- Gary Stewart – reissue coordination (1986 edition)
- Philip Milstein – research, assistance (1986 edition)
- Geoff Gans – repackage art direction (1986 edition)
- Monster X – repackage design (1986 edition)
- Richard P. Rodgers – front cover photo (1986 edition)
- Kevin J. Cummiskey – booklet photos (1986 edition)
- Bill Inglot – digital remastering (1986 edition)
- Ken Perry – digital remastering (1986 edition)
- David Wells – compilation, annotation (2003 edition)
- The Town House – remastering (2003 edition)
- Antony Amos – coordination (2003 edition)
