= RocKihnRoll =

Studio album by the Greg Kihn Band

Rockihnroll

Studio album by the Greg Kihn Band
- Released: June 1981
- Recorded: 1980–1981
- Studio: Fantasy, Berkeley, CA
- Genre: Rock, power pop
- Length: 31:28
- Label: Beserkley
- Producer: Matthew King Kaufman

The Greg Kihn Band chronology
Glass House Rock (1980)	Rockihnroll (1981)	Kihntinued (1982)

Singles from RocKihnRoll
- 1. "Can't Stop Hurtin' Myself" Released: 1980; 2. "The Breakup Song (They Don't Write 'Em)" Released: 1981; 3. "Sheila" Released: 1981; 4. "The Girl Most Likely" Released: 1981

Rockihnroll is the sixth studio album by Greg Kihn and the third album as the Greg Kihn Band. Released in 1981, it produced the band's second highest-charting single, "The Breakup Song (They Don't Write 'Em)".

== Critical reception ==
Professional ratings
Review scores
Source	Rating
AllMusic	4.5/5 stars
The Rolling Stone Album Guide	4/5 stars

The Boston Globe wrote that the album "starts out like a house-a-fire with three meaty, catchy, finely crafted power pop tunes."

== Track listing ==
No.	Title	Writer(s)	Length
1.	"Valerie"	Greg Kihn, Jack Heyrman, David Rosen	2:22
2.	"The Breakup Song (They Don't Write 'Em)"	Kihn, Steve Wright	2:50
3.	"Womankind"	Kihn	3:44
4.	"Can't Stop Hurtin' Myself"	Kihn	4:07
5.	"Trouble in Paradise"	Kihn	3:34
6.	"Sheila"	Tommy Roe	2:56
7.	"Nothing's Gonna Change"	Kihn, Wright	3:33
8.	"The Girl Most Likely"	Kihn, Wright, Larry Lynch, Dave Carpender	2:44
9.	"When the Music Starts"	Kihn	2:39
10.	"True Confessions"	Kihn	3:40

== Charts ==
Chart (1981)	Peak position
Australia (Kent Music Report)	72
US Billboard 200	32

== Personnel ==
The Greg Kihn Band

- Greg Kihn - lead vocals, rhythm guitar
- Dave Carpender - lead guitar, backing vocals
- Gary Phillips - keyboards, backing vocals
- Steve Wright - bass, backing vocals, keyboards
- Larry Lynch - drums, backing vocals, percussion

Production

- Producer: Matthew King Kaufman
- Engineers: Don Cody, Richard Corsello
- Mastering: George Horn
- Art direction: Ron Coro, Norm Ung
- Artwork/Design: Mike Fink
- Logistics: Brian Murray
