= Greg Kihn (album) =

Studio album by Greg Kihn
- Released: 1976
- Recorded: 1976
- Studios: CBS Studios, San Francisco, California
- Genre: Folk rock
- Length: 36:57
- Label: Beserkley
- Producers: Matthew King Kaufman, Glen Kolotkin

Greg Kihn chronology
Greg Kihn (1976)	Greg Kihn Again (1977)

Singles from Greg Kihn
- 1. "Any Other Woman" Released: 1976

Greg Kihn is the debut studio album by American singer-songwriter Greg Kihn. It was released by Beserkley in 1976.

The cover photo portrays Kihn as a working-class man and was shot in front of Rather Ripped Records in Berkeley where he worked at the time, with future Greg Kihn Band keyboard player Gary Phillips.

== Track listing ==
No.	Title	Writer(s)	Length
1.	"Don't Expect to Be Right"	Greg Kihn	4:05
2.	"Any Other Woman"	Kihn	3:41
3.	"Emily Davison"	Kihn, Rose Bimler	3:05
4.	"Try Try to Fall in Love"	Norman Desrosiers	3:41
5.	"Kid from Louieville"	Kihn	5:23
6.	"Worse Or Better"	Kihn	2:40
7.	"He Will Break Your Heart"	Jerry Butler, Curtis Mayfield, Calvin Carter	3:41
8.	"What Goes On"	Kihn	3:16
9.	"Satisfied"	Kihn	4:25
10.	"Why Don't You Try Me"	Billy Young	3:00

== Personnel ==
- Greg Kihn – 12-string guitar, vocals
- Robbie Dunbar – guitar, keyboards, backing vocals
- Larry Lynch – drums, percussion, backing vocals
- Steve Wright – bass

Additional personnel

- John Doukas – backing vocals, co-lead vocals on "He Will Break Your Heart"
- Gary Phillips – guitar, backing vocals
- Mark T. Jordan – keyboards

Production

- Producer: Matthew King Kaufman, Glen Kolotkin
- Engineers: Glen Kolotkin, Tom Lubin
- Mastering: George Horn
- Art direction: Ron Scherl, Tom Lubin
- Artwork/Design: M. M. Givens
- Logistics: C. Lovett
- Ron Scherl – cover photography
