= Kihnspiracy =

Studio album by the Greg Kihn Band
- Released: 1983
- Recorded: 1982–83
- Studios: Fantasy, Berkeley
- Length: 33:15
- Label: Beserkley
- Producer: Matthew King Kaufman

The Greg Kihn Band chronology
Kihntinued (1982)	Kihnspiracy (1983)	Kihntagious (1984)

Singles from Kihnspiracy
- 1. "Jeopardy" Released: 1983; 2. "Tear That City Down" Released: 1983; 3. "Love Never Fails" Released: 1983

Kihnspiracy is a studio album by the Greg Kihn Band, released in 1983 by Beserkley Records. The album features the hit single "Jeopardy", the band's only top 10 hit on the Billboard Hot 100 singles chart. It reached number 2 in May 1983, beneath Michael Jackson's "Beat It". A parody of the song, "I Lost on Jeopardy", was released by "Weird Al" Yankovic in 1984.

The album marks the group's first line-up change since 1975, with Greg Douglass taking over as lead guitar player after the departure of Dave Carpender. The band supported the album with a North American tour.

== Critical reception ==
Professional ratings
Review scores
Source	Rating
AllMusic	3.5/5 stars

The Philadelphia Inquirer deemed the album "undistinguished rock 'n' roll, marked by tight, efficient and totally plodding arrangements."

== Track listing ==
Side one
No.	Title	Writer(s)	Length
1.	"Jeopardy"	Greg Kihn, Steve Wright	3:47
2.	"Fascination"	Kihn	2:38
3.	"Tear that City Down"	Kihn, Wright, Greg Douglass, Gary Phillips, Larry Lynch	3:50
4.	"Talkin' to Myself"	Kihn	3:03
5.	"Can't Love Them All"	Kihn, Wright, Phillips	3:51

Side two
No.	Title	Writer(s)	Length
1.	"I Fall to Pieces"	Hank Cochran, Harlan Howard	2:48
2.	"Someday"	Kihn, Wright	3:22
3.	"Curious"	Kihn, Lynch	3:31
4.	"How Long"	Kihn	3:42
5.	"Love Never Fails"	Kihn, Wright, Lynch, Phillips, Douglass	3:25

== Charts ==
Chart (1983)	Peak position
Australia (Kent Music Report)	76
Canada Top Albums/CDs (RPM)	31
Swedish Albums (Sverigetopplistan)	36
US Billboard 200	15

== Personnel ==
The Greg Kihn Band

- Greg Kihn
- Greg Douglass
- Larry Lynch
- Gary Phillips
- Steve Wright

Technical

- Matthew King Kaufman – producer
- Dr. Schnoz – engineer
- Gary Hobish – assistant engineer
- Don Cody – additional engineering
- George Horn – mastering
- Tina Nielsen – title concept
- Marsha Necheles – title concept
- Ron Coro – art direction
- Mike Fink – art, design
- Phil Bray – photography
