= Next of Kihn =

Studio album by Greg Kihn
- Released: 1978
- Recorded: 1977–1978
- Studios: CBS, San Francisco
- Genre: Power pop
- Length: 36:29
- Label: Beserkley
- Producers: Matthew King Kaufman, Glen Kolotkin

Greg Kihn chronology
Greg Kihn Again (1977)	Next of Kihn (1978)	With the Naked Eye (1979)

Singles from Next of Kihn
- 1. "Sorry" Released: 1978; 2. "Remember" Released: 1978; 3. "Everybody Else" Released: 1978

Professional ratings
Review scores
Source	Rating
The Rolling Stone Album Guide	2.5/5 stars

Next of Kihn is a 1978 studio album by American singer-songwriter Greg Kihn. It was the third and last album to be released under the name Greg Kihn before the group changed into the Greg Kihn Band in 1979.

Next of Kihn has a notable darker sound than its predecessors and features longer and more complex compositions. The album's centerpiece "Remember" was recorded live in one single take.

== Track listing ==
All songs written by Greg Kihn, except "Everybody Else," which was written by Kihn and Rose Bimler (a.k.a. Matthew King Kaufman).

No.	Title	Length
1.	"Cold Hard Cash"	1:48
2.	"Museum"	3:34
3.	"Remember"	6:33
4.	"Chinatown"	4:47
5.	"Sorry"	3:25
6.	"Everybody Else"	5:10
7.	"Understander"	5:11
8.	"Secret Meetings"	6:01

== Charts ==
Chart (1978)	Peak position
Australia (Kent Music Report)	85

== Personnel ==
- Greg Kihn – guitar, vocals
- Dave Carpender – guitar, vocals
- Larry Lynch – drums, vocals
- Steve Wright – bass, vocals

Production

- Producers – Glen Kolotkin, Matthew King Kaufman
- Engineers – Glen Kolotkin, Tom Lubin
- Mastering – George Horn
- Art direction – Barbara Mendez
- Artwork/Design – Michael Zagaris
