= Kihntinued =

Studio album by the Greg Kihn Band
- Released: 1982
- Recorded: 1982
- Studios: Fantasy, Berkeley, California
- Length: 35:55
- Label: Beserkley
- Producer: Matthew King Kaufman

The Greg Kihn Band chronology
Rockihnroll (1981)	Kihntinued (1982)	Kihnspiracy (1983)

Singles from Kihntinued
- 1. "Happy Man" Released: 1982; 2. "Testify" Released: 1982; 3. "Every Love Song" Released: 1982

Kihntinued is a 1982 album by Greg Kihn and the fourth album to be released as the Greg Kihn Band. It was the final album to feature long-time guitarist Dave Carpender.

AllMusic gave the album 4 1/2 stars out of 5, calling out two songs as extraordinary: "Everyday/Saturday" and "Testify". The music was described as "not up to the potential Kihn hinted at on his first couple albums."

== Track listing ==
No.	Title	Writer(s)	Length
1.	"Happy Man"	Greg Kihn, Steve Wright	2:47
2.	"Every Love Song"	Kihn, Wright, Gary Phillips, Larry Lynch, Dave Carpender	4:26
3.	"Everyday/Saturday"	Kihn	3:00
4.	"Dedication"	Kihn, Rose Bimler	3:54
5.	"Tell Me Lies"	Kihn	3:23
6.	"Testify"	Kihn, Wright, Lynch, Phillips, Carpender	3:05
7.	"Sound System"	Kihn, Phillips	3:59
8.	"Seeing Is Believing"	Kihn, Wright, Bimler	3:25
9.	"Higher and Higher"	Gary Jackson, Carl Smith, Raynard Miner	3:32
10.	"Family"	Kihn	3:57

== Personnel ==
The Greg Kihn Band

- Greg Kihn – guitar, lead vocals
- Dave Carpender – guitar, backing vocals
- Gary Phillips – keyboards
- Steve Wright – bass, backing vocals; co-lead vocals on "Happy Man"
- Larry Lynch – drums, backing vocals; lead vocals on "Higher and Higher"

Additional personnel

- Jose Hernandez – saxophone on "Every Love Song"
- Greg Douglass – guitar on "Family"

== Charts ==
Chart (1982)	Peak position
Canada Top Albums/CDs (RPM)	30
US Billboard 200	33
