= Citizen Kihn =

Studio album by Greg Kihn
- Released: March 29, 1985
- Recorded: 1985
- Studio: Fantasy, Berkeley, California
- Genre: Pop rock
- Length: 37:36
- Label: EMI America
- Producer: Matthew King Kaufman

Greg Kihn chronology
Kihntagious (1984)	Citizen Kihn (1985)	Love & Rock & Roll (1986)

Singles from Citizen Kihn
- 1. "Lucky" Released: 1985; 2. "Boys Won't (Leave the Girls Alone)" Released: 1985; 3. "Good Life" Released: 1985

Citizen Kihn is a studio album by the American musician Greg Kihn, released in 1985 through EMI America. It was his first album since 1978's Next of Kihn not to be released under the Greg Kihn Band name. The album reached number 51 on the Billboard Hot 200. The first single was "Lucky".

== Critical reception ==
Professional ratings
Review scores
Source	Rating
The Rolling Stone Album Guide	2.5/5 stars

The Dallas Morning News deemed the album "a lackluster, unfocused pastiche of pop tunes."

== Track listing ==
All songs written by Greg Kihn and Steve Wright.

No.	Title	Length
1.	"I'm in Love Again"	3:06
2.	"Go Back"	3:06
3.	"Lucky"	3:30
4.	"Whenever"	3:50
5.	"Privacy"	4:10
6.	"Free Country"	2:25
7.	"They Rock by Night"	3:30
8.	"Boys Won't (Leave the Girls Alone)"	3:19
9.	"Imitation Love"	4:04
10.	"Temper, Temper"	2:40
11.	"Good Life"	3:34

== Personnel ==
- Greg Kihn – guitar, percussion, bellophone, lead vocals
- Greg Douglass – guitar
- Tyler Eng – drums
- Steve Wright – bass, keyboards, lead guitar on "Lucky" and "Good Life", backing vocals

Additional personnel

- Pat Mosca – keyboards on "They Rock By Night"
- John Talbott – backing vocals, cabasa, talking drum
- Steve Douglas – saxophone
- Andy Narell – steel drums
- Pete Escovedo – timbales, percussion

Production

- Producer: Matthew King Kaufman
- Engineers: Richard "Dr. Schnoz" Corsello, Tom Size
- Mastering: George Horn
- Alberto Dell'Orto – cover photography
