= Back to the Drawing Board! =

Studio album by the Rubinoos
- Released: 1979
- Studio: Ramport and Wally Heider
- Genre: Power pop
- Length: 31:44
- Label: Beserkley
- Producer: Matthew King Kaufman, Gary Phillips

The Rubinoos chronology
The Rubinoos (1977)	Back to the Drawing Board! (1979)	Party of Two EP (1983)

Back to the Drawing Board! is the Rubinoos' second album, released on Beserkley Records. Back to the Drawing Board! is a power pop album and fit well with the other power pop bands on Beserkley. It is known for the single "I Wanna Be Your Boyfriend", which gained notoriety when Rubinoos members Tommy Dunbar and James Gangwer sued Avril Lavigne, alleging that her hit "Girlfriend" had too much in common with it.

The Rubinoos re-released the album with bonus tracks on their own label in 2011.

== Critical reception ==
Professional ratings
Review scores
Source	Rating
AllMusic	3/5 stars
Christgau's Record Guide	C+
MusicHound Rock: The Essential Album Guide	3.5/5 stars

Trouser Press wrote: "Except for one superb Raspberries soundalike ('I Wanna Be Your Boyfriend'), the record seems too anxious to please, and suffers from noticeable timidity and fewer memorable songs."

== Track listing ==
All tracks composed by James Gangwer and Tommy Dunbar; except where noted.

1. "Fallin' in Love" (2:48)
2. "I Wanna Be Your Boyfriend" (3:16)
3. "Promise Me" (3:22)
4. "Hold Me" (Dave Oppenheim, Ira Schuster, Jack Little) - (3:01)
5. "Ronnie" (2:38)
6. "Drivin' Music" (James Gangwer, Jon Rubin, Tommy Dunbar) - (3:13)
7. "Operator" (2:57)
8. "Jennifer" (Gary Phillips, James Gangwer, Tommy Dunbar) - (2:33)
9. "Arcade Queen" (2:27)
10. "Lightning Love Affair" (Jon Rubin, Rose Bimlet, Tommy Dunbar) - (2:46)
11. "1, 2, 3 Forever" (Tommy Dunbar) - (2:43)
12. "Rendezvous" (Bonus Cut)
13. "Warm Summer Night" (Bonus Cut)
14. "Red Light Green Light" (Bonus Cut)
15. "Rumble" (Bonus Cut)

== Personnel ==
The Rubinoos

- Royse Ader – bass, vocals
- Tommy Dunbar – guitar, keyboards, vocals
- Jon Rubin – guitar, vocals
- Donn Spindt – percussion, drums, vocals

Technical

- Mark Dodson – engineer
- Matthew King Kaufman – producer
- Gary Phillips – producer
- Michael Zagaris - photography

== Releases ==
- LP Beserkley 1979
- CD Air Mail Recordings 2007
