= Rock Goes to College =

BBC series showcasing live rock performances

- Directed by: John Burrowes
- Presented by: Pete Drummond
- Country of origin: United Kingdom
- No. of series: 4

Production
- Producer: Michael Appleton

Original release
- Network: BBC2
- Release: 22 September 1978 – 19 March 1981

Related
- Jazz Goes to College

Rock Goes to College (RGTC) is a BBC series that ran between 1978 and 1981 on British television. A variety of up-coming rock oriented bands were showcased live from small venues and broadcast simultaneously on television and radio during a 40-50 minute live performance.

It was a follow-on to the mid-1960s BBC series Jazz Goes to College.

== Concert venues ==
The venues were small university, polytechnic or college halls holding a few thousand people; often tickets were given to the Students' Union to distribute for free. The bands chosen were also, in some cases, bands which did not have a mainstream following at that time although many went on to be very successful.

A BBC disc-jockey would also be present to introduce the band for the television audience.

== Innovation ==
The original broadcasts were transmitted on television as well as Sight and Sound in Concert; a BBC initiative to provide simultaneous pictures on BBC2 and stereo radio broadcasts on BBC Radio 1, as stereo television broadcasts and receivers did not exist at the time.

== Recordings ==
Original recordings of at least some of the Rock Goes to College series still exist and some legal releases have been made available, on DVD or CD, either as the concert in its entirety or as part of a compilation. UK Gold has re-broadcast some of the programmes (in stereo on television) in 2006 as has BBC Four and UK Arena in the late 1990s.

In some cases, the radio broadcasts contained additional songs to those broadcast via the television including pre-broadcast/warm-up tracks.

== Concert listing ==
Many performances have been bootlegged from the original tapes or from public television/radio broadcasts. All references to availability on DVD here refers to legally produced and sold articles.

== Episodes ==
=== Original Broadcasts 1978 (14 episodes) ===
- The Boomtown Rats, 22 September, Middlesex Polytechnic, Hendon
1. Mary of the 4th Form
2. Introduction - Peter Drummond
3. Me & Howard Hughes
4. I Never Loved Eva Braun
5. Don't Believe What You Read
6. Rat Trap
7. Kicks
8. Joey's on the Street Again
9. Living on an Island
10. She's Gonna Do You In
11. Like Clockwork
12. She's So Modern
13. Looking After No. 1
- Crawler, 29 September, University of London Union
- The Crusaders, 10 October, Colchester Institute, Essex
- The Stranglers. 20 October, University of Surrey, Guildford, Surrey
1. Ugly
2. I Feel Like a Wog
3. Bring on the Nubiles
4. Burning Up Time
5. Hanging Around

The concert is aborted when The Stranglers walk off stage, refusing to play to elitist audiences, after a dispute when an agreement to make tickets available outside of the college was not honoured.

- Rich Kids, 27 October, University of Reading - with Midge Ure & Glen Matlock
1. Only Arsenic
2. Hung on You
3. Rich Kids
4. Burning Sounds
5. Holy Holy
6. 12 Miles High
7. Forever & Ever
8. Marching Men
9. Lovers & Fools
10. Strange One
11. Empty Words
12. Ghosts of Princes in Towers
- The Climax Blues Band, 3 November, City of Birmingham Polytechnic.
- John Martyn, 20 October. Available on DVD.
1. May You Never
2. One World
3. One Day Without You
4. The Dealer
5. Certain Surprise
6. Big Muff
7. Anna
- AC/DC, 10 November, University of Essex, Colchester, Essex.

"Whole Lotta Rosie" available on the AC/DC compilation DVD Family Jewels. "Problem Child", "Sin City", "Bad Boy Boogie" available on the compilation DVD set Plug Me In. Introduced by Pete Drummond.

1. "Live Wire"
2. "Problem Child"
3. "Sin City"
4. "Bad Boy Boogie"
5. "Whole Lotta Rosie"
6. "Rocker"
7. "Let There Be Rock"
- Lindisfarne, December, University of Essex, Colchester, Essex.
1. Court in the Act
2. Lady Eleanor
3. Winter Song
4. Make Me Want to Stay
5. Kings Cross Blues
6. Meet Me on the Corner
7. Run for Home
8. Brand New Day
9. We Can Swing Together
- Cheap Trick
1. Hello There
2. Come On, Come On
3. Stiff Competition
4. Guitar Solo/Jam
5. Ain't That a Shame
6. Need Your Love
7. I Want You to Want Me
8. California Man
9. Surrender
- Ian Dury & the Blockheads, Queen's University Belfast
- Be-Bop Deluxe, Oxford
1. New Precision
2. Superenigmatix
3. Possession
4. Dangerous Stranger
5. Islands of the Dead
6. Lovers Are Mortal
7. Panic in the World
- George Thorogood, Middlesex Polytechnic, Hendon

[Ride on Josephine

1. Cocaine Blues
2. It Wasn't Me
3. I'm Just Your Good Thing
4. Madison Blues
5. New Hawaiian Boogie
6. Who Do You Love
7. No Particular Place to Go
8. Johnny B Goode
- Tom Robinson Band

=== Original Broadcasts 1979 (8 episodes) ===
- Bethnal, 6 January, University of London Union
- The Cars, 13 January, University of Sussex, Brighton
1. Just What I Needed
2. Good Times Roll
3. I'm in Touch with Your World
4. My Best Friend's Girl
5. Moving in Stereo
6. All Mixed Up
7. Night Spots
8. Bye Bye Love
9. Don't Cha Stop
10. You're All I've Got Tonight
- The Rubinoos, 20 January, University of Reading
1. Tonight 3:44
2. I Think We're Alone Now 2:59
3. Hard to Get 3:00
4. I Never Thought It Would Happen 3:06
5. I Wanna Be Your Boyfriend 3:40
6. Hey Royse 2:19
7. Promise Me 3:42
8. Hold Me 3:14
9. Fallin' in Love 2:08
10. Arcade Queen 2:34
11. Please Please Me1:51
12. Walk Don't Run 2:23
13. Rock 'n' Roll Is Dead 3:15
- Rory Gallagher, 27 January, Middlesex Polytechnic
1. Shin Kicker
2. The Mississippi Sheiks
3. Do You Read Me
4. Brute Force & Ignorance
5. Fuel to the Fire
6. Shadow Play
7. Cruise on Out
- The Police, 21 February, Hatfield Polytechnic
1. Can't Stand Losing You
2. So Lonely
3. Fall Out
4. Hole in My Life
5. Truth Hits Everybody
6. Message in a Bottle (first live performance and not released as a single)
7. Peanuts
8. Roxanne
9. Next to You
- Steve Hillage, 28 February, University of Kent at Canterbury (broadcast 10 March)
1. Salmon Song
2. Unzipping the Zype
3. Hurdy Gurdy Man
4. 1988 Aktivator
5. Unidentified (Flying Being)
6. It's All Too Much
- Bruford, 17 March, Oxford Polytechnic, Oxfordshire (feat. Allan Holdsworth: guitar / Annette Peacock: vocals). Available on DVD.
1. Sample and Hold
2. Beelzebub
3. The Sahara of Snow (part one)
4. The Sahara of Snow (part two)
5. Forever until Sunday
6. Back to the Beginning
7. Adios a la Pasada (Goodbye to the Past)
8. 5G
- Average White Band, University of Surrey, Guildford
1. When Will You Be Mine
2. Atlantic Avenue
3. A Love of Your Own
4. I'm the One
5. Walk on By
6. Feel No Fret

=== Original Broadcasts 1980 (12 episodes) ===
- Joe Jackson, 14 January, Hatfield Polytechnic
1. Look Sharp!
2. Baby Stick Around
3. Sunday Papers
4. One More Time
5. Friday
6. It's Different for Girls
7. Don't Wanna Be Like That
8. Happy Loving Couples
9. I'm the Man
10. Got the Time
11. Is She Really Going Out with Him?
12. Come On
- The Specials, 21 January, Colchester Institute, Colchester, Essex
1. Do the Dog
2. Monkey Man
3. Rat Race
4. Blank Expression
5. Rude Boys Outta Jail
6. Doesn't Make it Alright
7. Concrete Jungle
8. Too Much Too Young
9. Guns of Navarone
10. Nite Klub
11. Gangsters
12. Longshot Kick de Bucket
13. Madness
14. You're Wondering Now
- Live Wire, 4 February, Brighton Polytechnic
- Secret Affair, 11 February, University of Bristol, Bristol
- Spyro Gyra, 18 February, University of Leeds, Yorkshire (first ever British performance)
- Joe Ely Band, 20 February, Middlesex Polytechnic
- Robin Trower, 25 February, University of London Union, London
1. Day of the Eagle
2. The Ring, Bridge of Sighs
3. Too Rolling Stoned
4. The Shout/Hannah
5. Daydream
6. Victims of the Fury
7. Little Bit of Sympathy
- April Wine, 10 March, University of Reading
- Tom Petty, 24 March, Oxford Polytechnic, Oxford
1. Shadow of a Doubt
2. Anything That's Rock 'n' Roll
3. Introduction - Peter Drummond
4. Even the Losers
5. Here Comes My Girl
6. I Need to Know
7. Luna
8. Stories We Could Tell
9. Refugee
10. Breakdown
11. American Girl
- Steve Forbert, 31 March, Lancaster University
1. Going Down to Laurel
2. Romeo's Tune
3. Complications
4. Down by the Sally Gardens
5. What Kind a Guy
6. Steve Forbert's Midsummernight's Toast
7. Thinking
8. The Sweet Love That You Give Shure Goes a Long Long Way
9. Say Goodbye to Little Joe
10. You Can Not Win If You Do Not Play
11. Medley: Nadine, Polk Salad Annie, You Can Not Win If You Do Not Play
- The Blues Band, 22 May, Keele University
- After the Fire, 7 November, City University, London (broadcast 16 March 1981)
1. Sailing Ship (instrumental)
2. Wild West Show
3. Can You Face It?

=== Original Broadcasts 1981 (11 episodes) ===
- Q-Tips, 12 January, Hatfield Polytechnic
- UB40, 19 January, Keele University
1. King
2. Strange Fruit
3. The Earth Dies Screaming
4. Little by Little
5. I Think It's Going to Rain Today
6. Food for Thought
7. Tyler
8. Signing Off
- The Motels, 26 January, University of Bradford
1. Kicks
2. Anticipating
3. Days Are O.K. (But the Nights Were Made for Love)
4. Closets & Bullets
5. Whose Problem?
6. Total Control
7. Party Professionals
8. Cry Baby
9. Envy
10. Danger
11. Conroy Guy
12. Wondering
- John Martyn, 2 February, Chelsea School of Art
- The Roches, 9 February, Loughborough University of Technology
1. Bad for Me
2. We
3. Nurds
4. The Troubles
5. My Sick Mind
6. Hallelujah Chorus
7. Hammond Song
8. Mr. Sellack
- U2, 23 January, Queen's University Belfast
1. The Ocean
2. 11 O’Clock Tick Tock
3. Cry - The Electric Co.
4. Out of Control
5. Gloria
6. I Fall Down
- Stiff Little Fingers, 23 January, Queen's University Belfast
- B. A. Robertson, 16 February, Preston Polytechnic, Lancashire
- Gillan, 23 February, Oxford Polytechnic, Oxford. Available on DVD, "The Glory Years".
1. Unchain Your Brain
2. Mr Universe
3. No Easy Way
4. Trouble
5. Mutually Assured Destruction
6. On the Rocks
7. Vengenace
8. New Orleans
- John Martyn. 2 March, University of Stirling. Available on DVD.
1. Big Muff
2. Some People Are Crazy
3. Grace and Danger
4. Save Some (For Me)
5. Eibhil Ghail Chiuin Ni Chearbhail
6. Couldn't Love You More
7. Amsterdam Rock
8. Johnny Too Bad
- Siouxsie and The Banshees, 19 March, Warwick Arts Centre, University of Warwick, Warwickshire
1. Israel
2. Spellbound
3. Arabian Knights
4. Halloween
5. Christine
6. Night Shift
7. Red Light
8. But Not Them
9. Voodoo Dolly
10. Eve White/Eve Black

== Bootlegs ==
In general, many of these performances will have only have been shown a very limited number of times on television and in some cases only once. Very few of these concerts seem to have made it to legal DVD (such as the Bill Bruford, both John Martyn and a sample of AC/DC).

Bootlegs exist created from original television (although very few domestic video recorders were around at the time) and radio broadcasts (through cassette tapes) as well as subsequent repeats. In particular, the AC/DC, Specials, Robin Trower, Ian Gillan, Cars, Police and U2 DVDs, CDs and tapes are commonly found advertised on trader's sites.

Some of the shows, such as AC/DC and The Police, have been recently broadcast on VH1 Classic on the show BBC Crown Jewels.
