= Kihntagious =

Studio album by the Greg Kihn Band
- Released: 1984
- Recorded: 1984
- Studios: Studio C, Fantasy, Berkeley, CA
- Genre: Pop rock
- Length: 36:03
- Label: Beserkley
- Producer: Matthew King Kaufman

The Greg Kihn Band chronology
| Kihnspiracy (1983) | Kihntagious (1984) | Citizen Kihn (1985) |

Singles from Kihntagious
- 1. "Reunited" Released: 1984; 2. "Rock" Released: 1984; 3. "Stand Together" Released: 1984

Kihntagious is a 1984 studio album by the Greg Kihn Band. It is the last album to feature drummer and founding member Larry Lynch and keyboard player Gary Phillips.

The album was recorded in Studio "C" at Fantasy Studios in Berkeley, California.

== Critical reception ==
Professional ratings
Review scores
| Source | Rating |
|---|---|
| AllMusic | 3/5 stars |
| The Rolling Stone Album Guide | 3.5/5 stars |

The Philadelphia Inquirer noted that Kihn's "music is fundamentally sound, but it also appears so carefully structured that there is little room in it for emotion."

The Rolling Stone Album Guide considered "Reunited" to be among Kihn's "most memorable work."

== Track listing ==
| No. | Title | Writer(s) | Length |
|---|---|---|---|
| 1. | "Reunited" | Greg Kihn, Steve Wright, Gary Phillips | 3:18 |
| 2. | "Rock" | Kihn, Wright | 3:56 |
| 3. | "Make Up" | Kihn, Wright | 3:59 |
| 4. | "Stand Together" | Kihn, Wright, Greg Douglass | 3:43 |
| 5. | "Confrontation Music" | Kihn, Douglass | 4:05 |
| 6. | "One Thing About Love" | Kihn, Wright, Larry Lynch, Phillips, Douglass | 3:03 |
| 7. | "Worst that Could Happen" | Kihn, Phillips | 3:30 |
| 8. | "Trouble with the Girl" | Kihn, Wright, Phillips | 3:09 |
| 9. | "Cheri Baby" | Errol Brown, Tony Wilson | 3:31 |
| 10. | "Hard Times" | Kihn, Lynch, Wright | 3:26 |
| 11. | "Work, Work, Work" | Kihn | 2:23 |

== Personnel ==
- Greg Kihn – guitar, vocals
- Greg Douglass – guitar, slide guitar, vocals
- Larry Lynch – drums, vocals, co-lead vocals on "Hard Times"
- Steve Wright – bass, vocals, chorus vocals on "Trouble with the Girl"
- Gary Phillips – keyboards

Production

- Producer: Matthew King Kaufman
