= The Rubinoos (album) =

Studio album by The Rubinoos
- Released: 1977
- Recorded: Columbia Studios
- Genre: Power pop, new wave
- Label: Beserkley
- Producer: Gary Phillips, Glen Kolotkin, Matthew King Kaufman

The Rubinoos chronology
The Rubinoos (1977)	Back to the Drawing Board! (1979)

Professional ratings
Review scores
Source	Rating
AllMusic	4.5/5 stars
Uncut	3/5 stars

The Rubinoos was the 1977 debut album by American power pop band the Rubinoos. It was rereleased a number of times on different labels with different bonus tracks. The Rubinoos re-released it again on their own label on November 30, 2011 (bonus tracks listed below).

== Track listing ==
1. "I Think We're Alone Now" (Bo Gentry, Richie Cordell) – 2:52
2. "Leave My Heart Alone" (James Gangwer, Tommy Dunbar) – 2:37
3. "Hard to Get" (Gangwer, Dunbar) – 3:02
4. "Peek-A-Boo" (Jack Hammer) – 2:09
5. "Rock and Roll is Dead" (Alex Carlin, Jon Rubin, Dunbar) – 2:50
6. "Memories" (Dunbar) – 5:32
7. "Nothing a Little Love Won't Cure" (Dunbar) – 2:37
8. "Wouldn't It Be Nice" (Gangwer, Dunbar) – 3:21
9. "Make It Easy" (Dunbar) – 3:02
10. "I Never Thought It Would Happen" (Royse Ader, Gangwer, Dunbar) – 2:33

Bonus tracks

11. "Rhythm of Love" (bonus track)
12. "As Long As I'm With You" (bonus track)
13. "Gorilla" (bonus track)
14. "Animal Farm" (bonus track)
15. "Eyes On Love" (bonus track)
16. "Cats and Dogs" (bonus track)

== Personnel ==
The Rubinoos

- Jon Rubin – lead vocals, rhythm guitar
- Tommy Dunbar – lead guitar, backing vocals, keyboards; lead vocals on "Rock and Roll is Dead"
- Royse Ader – bass, backing vocals
- Donn Spindt – drums, backing vocals, percussion; lead vocals on "Peek-A-Boo"

Additional personnel

- Larry Lynch – congas in "Hard to Get"
- Mark Naftalin – piano on "Peek-A-Boo"

Technical

- Glen Kolotkin – engineer "knobs, dials & switches"
- Tom Lubin – assistant engineer
- William Snyder – cover artwork
