= P.J. Flaherty's =

Coordinates: 41°43′14″N 87°41′10″W

P.J. Flaherty's was a music venue located in Evergreen Park, Illinois. It was particularly popular in the 1980s and early 1990s hosting artists such as Gregg Allman, Bo Diddley, Foghat, Robin Trower, Keith Reid and Bowser from Sha Na Na, The Romantics, Greg Kihn Band, Blue Öyster Cult.
