= Party of Two EP =

Party of Two

EP by The Rubinoos
- Released: 1983
- Genre: Power pop, new wave
- Label: Beserkley
- Producer: Todd Rundgren, Roger Powell, Kasim Sulton, Willie Wilcox

The Rubinoos chronology
Back to the Drawing Board! (1979)	Party of Two (1983)	Paleophonic (1998)

Party of Two was the 1983 EP by American power pop band the Rubinoos released by Beserkley Records and re-released by Wounded Bird Records, March 13, 2007, with bonus tracks.

It was executive produced by Todd Rundgren with original members Jon Rubin and Tommy Dunbar supported by Utopia's Roger Powell, Kasim Sulton and Willie Wilcox.

== Track listing ==
1. "If I Had You Back"
2. "Faded Dream"
3. "The Girl"
4. "Crash Landing"
5. "The Magic's Back"

=== 2007 bonus tracks ===
6. "Over You"
7. " Facts of Love"
8. "Stop Before We Start"
9. "If I Had You Back" (demo version)
10. "The Girl" (demo version)
11. "Crash Landing" (demo version)

== Personnel ==
- Jon Rubin – vocals
- Tommy Dunbar – vocals, all guitars, keyboards
- Roger Powell – keyboards
- Kasim Sulton – bass
- Willie Wilcox – drums & programming
