= The Breakup Song (They Don't Write 'Em) =

- U.S. release picture sleeve

Single by The Greg Kihn Band

from the album RocKihnRoll
- B-side: "When the Music Starts"
- Released: May 1981
- Recorded: 1980
- Genre: Pop rock; power pop
- Length: 2:56 (album version); 2:50 (single version)
- Label: Beserkley
- Songwriters: Greg Kihn, Steve Wright
- Producer: Matthew King Kaufman

The Greg Kihn Band singles chronology
"Remember" (1978)	"The Breakup Song (They Don't Write 'Em)" (1981)	"Sheila" (1981)

"The Breakup Song (They Don't Write 'Em)" is a song written by Greg Kihn and Steve Wright and recorded by the American rock band the Greg Kihn Band. It is the first single from the band's sixth studio album, RocKihnRoll (1981). The song's musical style encompasses pop rock and power pop.

== Meaning ==
It celebrates the quality of breakup songs in rock's earlier times, as the narrator laments both his recent breakup and the fact that they don't write good breakup songs anymore.

== Release ==
The song reached No. 15 on the Billboard Hot 100 singles chart and #5 on the Billboard Top Tracks chart.

== In popular culture ==
It has been featured in several films, including Let Me In (2010), The House of the Devil (2009), The Groomsmen (2006) and Beautiful Girls (1996), as well as in the smash-hit Rockstar Games video game Grand Theft Auto V (2013), appearing on in-game radio station Los Santos Rock Radio, and in the end credits of the in-game movie “Meltdown.” It was sampled in "Gone" by Yelawolf on his Arena Rap EP. It was also featured in a season five episode of The Sopranos. Additionally, the TV show The Nanny made a reference to the song when Fran said they don't write them like that anymore.

== Track listing ==
- 12" maxi (AS-11506)
1. "The Breakup Song (They Don't Write 'Em)" - 3:42
2. "The Girl Most Likely" - 3:46
3. "Can't Stop Hurtin' Myself" - 4:30
4. "Valerie" - 2:44
- 7" single (B-47149)
1. "The Breakup Song (They Don't Write 'Em)" - 2:50
2. "When the Music Starts" - 2:34

== Charts ==
=== Weekly charts ===
Chart (1981)	Peak position
Australia (Kent Music Report)	14
Canada (RPM)	25
New Zealand (Recorded Music NZ)	33
US (Billboard Hot 100)	15

=== Year-end charts ===
Year-end chart (1981)	Rank
US Top Pop Singles (Billboard)	47
