= Abracadabra (Steve Miller Band album) =

Album by the Steve Miller band

Studio album by Steve Miller Band
- Released: June 15, 1982
- Recorded: 1981
- Studios: Capitol, Hollywood, California
- Genres: Synth-pop; new wave
- Length: 37:08
- Label: Capitol
- Producers: Steve Miller; Gary Mallaber

Steve Miller Band chronology
Circle of Love (1981)	Abracadabra (1982)	Steve Miller Band Live! (1983)

Singles from Abracadabra
- 1. "Abracadabra" Released: May 1982; 2. "Keeps Me Wondering Why" Released: 6 August 1982 (UK); 3. "Cool Magic" Released: October 1982 (US); 4. "Give It Up" Released: October 1982 (UK); 5. "Goodbye Love" Released: 11 February 1983 (Ger.)

Abracadabra is the twelfth studio album by American rock band Steve Miller Band. The album was released on June 15, 1982, by Capitol Records.

Abracadabra charted in nine countries, including Germany where the record reached No. 1 for a week. Four singles were released from the album in various countries: the title track, "Cool Magic" (#57 on the Billboard Hot 100), "Keeps Me Wondering Why", and "Give It Up", with the title song charting the highest at #1 on the pop chart.

Unusually for the band, lead singer/guitarist Steve Miller did not write most of the songs. Drummer Gary Mallaber had brought in a handful of demos from his other band Tracker, which featured several Miller associates. Mallaber hoped one of the songs would be used for the album, but Miller used all of them and Mallaber received eight co-writing credits. Miller, meanwhile, produced two of his own songs; the title track and the "Heart Like a Wheel"-soundalike "Give It Up".

== Critical reception ==
Professional ratings
Review scores
Source	Rating
AllMusic	3/5 stars
The Encyclopedia of Popular Music	3/5 stars
Rolling Stone	4/5 stars

Billboard called the track "Cool Magic" a "catchy midtempo pop tune that takes dead aim at car radios everywhere." Billboard also described the song as being "harder rocking" than the title track. Cash Box called it "a light, straightahead pop/rocker that, in places, brings to mind the Beach Boys or the Beatles."

== Track listing ==
Side one
No.	Title	Writer(s)	Length
1.	"Keeps Me Wondering Why"	Gary Mallaber, Kenny Lee Lewis	3:43
2.	"Abracadabra"	Steve Miller	5:08
3.	"Something Special"	Mallaber, Lonnie Turner, Greg Douglass	3:35
4.	"Give It Up"	Miller	3:35
5.	"Never Say No"	Mallaber, John Massaro, Lewis	3:37

Side two
No.	Title	Writer(s)	Length
6.	"Things I Told You"	Mallaber, Massaro	3:15
7.	"Young Girl's Heart"	Mallaber, Massaro	3:33
8.	"Goodbye Love"	Mallaber, Douglass, Turner	2:53
9.	"Cool Magic"	Mallaber, Lewis	4:23
10.	"While I'm Waiting"	Mallaber, Massaro	3:26

== Personnel ==
- Steve Miller – vocals, guitar, Synclavier, synthesizers on track 2, Roland Jupiter-8 on track 2 and Roland Juno-60 on track 2
- John Massaro – guitar
- Kenny Lee Lewis – guitar
- Byron Allred – keyboards
- Gerald Johnson – bass guitar
- Gary Mallaber – drums, percussion, keyboards

Additional personnel

- Greg Douglass – guitar on tracks 3 and 8
- Lonnie Turner – bass guitar on tracks 3 and 8

Technical

- Produced by Steve Miller and Gary Mallaber
- Recorded and mixed by David N. Cole
- Additional recording by Gary Mallaber
- Executive Producer – John Palladino
- Photography – David Alexander
- Art – Tommy Steele
- Design – Tommy Steele, Jeff Lancaster

== Charts ==
=== Weekly charts ===
Weekly chart performance for Abracadabra
Chart (1982)	Peak position
Australian Albums (Kent Music Report)	5
Austrian Top 75 Albums	8
Canadian Top Albums	4
German Albums	1
Netherlands Top 100 Albums	11
New Zealand Top 50 Albums	47
Norwegian Top 40 Albums	10
Swedish Top 60 Albums	3
UK Albums Chart	10
US Billboard 200	3
US Top R&B/Hip-Hop Albums (Billboard)	40

=== Year-end charts ===
Year-end chart performance for Abracadabra
Chart (1982)	Position
Canada Top Albums/CDs (RPM)	25
German Albums (Offizielle Top 100)	27
US Billboard 200	77

== Certifications ==
Certifications for Abracadabra
Region	Certification	Certified units/sales
Australia (ARIA)	Platinum	50,000^{^}
Canada (Music Canada)	Platinum	100,000^{^}
Hong Kong (IFPI Hong Kong)	Gold	10,000^{*}
United Kingdom (BPI)	Silver	60,000^{^}
United States (RIAA)	Platinum	1,000,000^{^}
^{*} Sales figures based on certification alone.^{^} Shipments figures based on certification alone.
