= Greg Douglass =

- Born: 11 October 1949 (age 76); Oakland, California, United States
- Genres: Rock, hard rock, blues rock
- Occupations: Musician, songwriter
- Instruments: Guitar, vocals
- Years active: 1968–present
- Website: Official website

Greg Douglass (born 1949 in Oakland, California, United States) is an American rock guitarist.

== Career ==
Douglass started his musical career in the late 1960s with his band The Virtues, which later turned into the acid-rock group Country Weather. He came in contact with Van Morrison and Jefferson Airplane spin-off band Hot Tuna and ended up touring with both of them.

After his departure from Hot Tuna, Douglass founded the group Terry & the Pirates. He got in contact with Steve Miller Band bassist Lonnie Turner in 1977 and co-wrote the song "Jungle Love" as well as playing on Miller's tenth studio album, Book of Dreams. In 2002, "Jungle Love" became the theme song for CBS-TV sitcom, Everybody Loves Raymond, opening the program for seasons 7-9.

Douglass was a member of the band John Cipollina's Raven and appeared on 1980 album "Raven". He joined The Greg Kihn Band in 1983 and played on the band's hit single "Jeopardy". After recording Kihnspiracy, Kihntagious, and Citizen Kihn, Douglass left the group and toured with Tom Fogerty and Eddie Money.

Douglass has lived in the San Diego area since 1994, where he remains active as a touring guitarist (Big Brother and the Holding Company, the Electric Flag), a studio player, and a music instructor. He leads his own four-piece group, the Greg Douglass Band, playing concerts, clubs, corporate events. He also spends about a month each year touring Europe, primarily the UK.

== Partial discography ==
This is a partial listing of album Greg Douglass has played on. Info on additional writing credits is included.

=== Solo albums ===
1996 Free flyte

2001. The Natives are restless

- 2016 Flight of the Golden Dragon

=== With The Steve Miller Band ===
- 1977 Book of Dreams (also co-wrote "Jungle Love")
- 1978 Greatest Hits 1974–78

Douglass also co-wrote two songs ("Something Special" and "Goodbye Love") on Miller's 1983 album Abracadabra, as well as "Maelstrom" for his 1986 album, Living in the 20th Century. Additionally, Douglass' work with the Steve Miller Band has been reissued numerous times on greatest hits compilations.

=== With the Greg Kihn Band ===
- 1985 Citizen Kihn
- 1984 Kihntagious (also co-wrote "Stand Alone" and "One Thing About Love")
- 1983 Kihnspiracy (also co-wrote "Tear That City Down")

Douglass also co-wrote and played on "Family Man", included on Kihn's 1982 album, Kihntinued

=== With Tom Fogerty ===
- 1981 Deal It Out

=== With Tom Johnston ===
- 1981 Still Feels Good (also co-wrote "Wishing")

=== With Eddie Money ===
- 1980 Playing for Keeps (also co-wrote "Trinidad")

=== With Terry & The Pirates ===
- 1980 The Doubtful Handshake
- 1979 Too Close For Comfort
