= Allan Mason =

- Born: Baltimore, Maryland
- Origin: Los Angeles, California
- Occupations: Music executive; Artists and Repertoire; producer
- Labels: A&M Records, Janus Records

Allan Mason is an American record producer and A&R executive.

== Music career ==
Mason was the vice president in charge of A&R when GRT Records assumed sole ownership of Janus Records in 1971, after Pye Records pulled out of the venture.

Mason, along with Stuart Love at Warner Brothers, Matthew Kaufman at A&M, John Cale, and Kim Fowley provided the initial money for a demo for Jonathan Richman's band The Modern Lovers.

== Filmography ==
Mason was the music consultant for Father of the Bride and an executive music producer for Bandits. He is known for his long-standing film collaborations with Barry Levinson, acting as music consultant and supervisor on the Levinson films Good Morning, Vietnam and Rain Man, among others.

== Personal life ==
Mason attended University of Maryland, College Park. Currently, he resides in Los Angeles, California.
