= Roadrunner (Jonathan Richman song) =

1976 single by the Modern Lovers

- Cover of the 1977 Netherlands single

Single by the Modern Lovers

from the album The Modern Lovers
- B-side: "Pablo Picasso"
- Released: October 1976
- Recorded: April 1972
- Genre: Proto-punk; garage rock; rock and roll
- Length: 4:04 (1972/1976 version, "Roadrunner (Twice)"); 4:40 (1975/1977 version, "Roadrunner (Once)")
- Label: Beserkley
- Songwriter: Jonathan Richman
- Producer: John Cale

Official audio
- "Roadrunner (Once)" on YouTube

"Roadrunner" is a song written by Jonathan Richman and recorded in various versions by Richman and his band, in most cases credited as the Modern Lovers. Richman has described it as an ode to Massachusetts Route 128.

Critic Greil Marcus described it as "the most obvious song in the world, and the strangest". Rolling Stone ranked it No. 269 on their list of the 500 Greatest Songs of All Time in 2004 and No. 77 in 2021. In 2025, it topped their list of the 50 Best Road-Trip Songs. It charted at no.11 on the UK chart in 1977.

== Origins of the song ==
As a teenager Richman saw the Velvet Underground perform many times, and the format of "Roadrunner" is derived directly from the Velvets' song "Sister Ray". "Roadrunner" mainly uses two chords (D and A, and only two brief uses of E) rather than "Sister Ray"'s three (which are G, F, and C), but they share the same persistent throbbing rhythm, and lyrics which in performance were largely improvised around a central theme.

Richman wrote the song by 1970, when he began performing it in public, aged 19. Former bandmate John Felice recalled that as teenagers he and Richman "used to get in the car and just drive up and down Route 128 and the Turnpike. We'd come up over a hill and he’d see the radio towers, the beacons flashing, and he would get almost teary-eyed. He'd see all this beauty in things where other people just wouldn’t see it."

== Recordings by Jonathan Richman and the Modern Lovers ==
Richman's band the Modern Lovers first recorded "Roadrunner" with producer John Cale (previously of the Velvet Underground) in 1972. This version was first released as a single and in 1976 on the Modern Lovers' long-delayed but highly acclaimed self-titled debut album (originally Home of the Hits HH019). The song is considered a rock and roll standard, a garage band classic and a proto-punk anthem.

Later in 1972, the group recorded two more versions with Kim Fowley, which were released in 1981 on the album, The Original Modern Lovers (Bomp BLP 4021). A live version from 1973 was also later officially released on the album Live At Longbranch Saloon.

The most commercially successful version of the song, credited to Richman as a solo artist, was recorded for Beserkley Records in late 1974, produced by label boss Matthew King Kaufman, featured Jonathan backed by The Greg Kihn Band and released at the time on a single (Beserkley B-5701) with a B-side by the band Earth Quake. Kaufman stated: "To record "Roadrunner" took the 3 minutes 35 seconds for the performance, about another 30 minutes to dump the background vocals on, and another 90 minutes to mix it".

This version was reissued in 1975 on the album Beserkley Chartbusters Vol. 1 (Beserkley JBZ-0044). In the UK, where Richman had received substantial and very positive publicity in the music press, it was released in 1977 as a single (Beserkley BZZ 1), known as “Roadrunner (Once)” and credited to Jonathan Richman, with the Cale-produced “Roadrunner (Twice)” on the B-side, credited to the Modern Lovers, and lasting approximately 4:06. This single reached number 11 in the UK singles chart in August 1977. Also in 1977, a live version titled “Roadrunner (Thrice)” lasting 8:24 was released as the B-side of the UK single "The Morning Of Our Lives" (Beserkley BZZ 7).

== Cover versions ==
A version of "Roadrunner" was recorded by the Sex Pistols as a rough demo in 1976, seemingly in a spontaneous transition from Chuck Berry's "Johnny B. Goode", which is in the same key and a similar tempo. This recording was overdubbed in 1978 and released in 1979 on The Great Rock 'n' Roll Swindle album. Pistols' vocalist Johnny Rotten said that although he "hate(s) all music", "Roadrunner" is his favorite song. However, in the recording, he forgets most of the lyrics.

The Jazz Butcher recorded a version in Wellingborough (UK) in April 1984 and was included on the compilation album The Gift of Music. Joan Jett and the Blackhearts covered the song on their fifth studio album Good Music (1986), and Jett released a different cover on her seventh studio album The Hit List (1990).

== Influence ==
Journalist Laura Barton described "Roadrunner" as "one of the most magical songs in existence". In July 2007, Barton wrote an essay published in the newspaper about her attempt to visit all the places mentioned in Richman's recorded versions of the song, including the Stop & Shop at Natick, Massachusetts, the Howard Johnson's restaurant, the Prudential Tower, Quincy, Cohasset, Deer Island, Route 128, and Interstate 90.

On February 13, 2013, then State Representative Marty Walsh introduced a bill to have "Roadrunner" named official rock song of Massachusetts. Richman however came out against this saying, "I don't think the song is good enough to be a Massachusetts song of any kind." Comedian and Massachusetts native John Hodgman came out in support of Walsh's bill, saying the song was, "woven as deeply into the cultural landscape of Massachusetts as the Turnpike itself. It is the pulsing sound of the night and the future. It connects the midnight ride of Paul Revere with the dream of every Massachusetts teenager who has just gotten their license and is discovering the Freedom Trail that is Route 128 after the last movie lets out." An Act designating the song "Roadrunner" as the official rock song of the Commonwealth of Massachusetts was proposed by Representatives David Linsky and Denise Provost and ordered to a third reading on April 19, 2018.

The Roadrunner music venue, which opened in Boston in 2022, is named after the song.

== Other sources ==
- Mitchell, Tim (1999). There's Something About Jonathan. Peter Owen. ISBN 0-7206-1076-1.
