= Sheila (Tommy Roe song) =

Single by Tommy Roe

from the album Sheila
- B-side: "Save Your Kisses"
- Released: 1962
- Recorded: 1962 (re-recording)
- Genre: Bubblegum pop, Rockabilly, Rock and Roll, Lubbock Sound
- Length: 2:03
- Label: ABC-Paramount
- Songwriter: Tommy Roe

Tommy Roe singles chronology
"I Got a Girl" (1960)	"Sheila" (1962)	"Susie Darlin'" (1962)

"Sheila" is a song written and recorded by Tommy Roe. The single reached number one on the U.S. Billboard Hot 100 on September 1, 1962, remaining in the top position for two weeks and peaking at number six on the US Billboard R&B chart.

== Background ==
Roe originally conceived the song as "Frita", based on a girl from Roe's high school. The song was auditioned to a record producer from Judd Records, and while response was enthusiastic, it was suggested that the name be changed. By coincidence, Roe's Aunt Sheila was visiting, which inspired the final title of "Sheila". The original version of the song was recorded by Roe for Judd in 1960 (misspelled as "Shelia") and backed by another original song, "Pretty Girl". The songs were recorded with his then backing group the Satins and the female vocal group the Flamingos. The record failed to make an impact on the charts. The song was later featured on the compilation album Whirling with Tommy Roe in 1961, featuring tracks from Al Tornello. It was also included on the compilation The Young Lovers in 1962.

The ABC recording of the song is done in the style of the Lubbock sound, made popular by Buddy Holly and the Crickets in the late 1950s; the strumming pattern, tempo, drumming, and chords (both songs are in the key of A) bear particularly strong resemblance to the Crickets' “Peggy Sue"; Roe's vocals are similar to Holly's. The song became the title track of Tommy Roe's debut studio album, Sheila, in 1962.

The backside of the hit, Save Your Kisses, was written by Edwin Bruce and Ira Lichterman, published by Tuneville Music owned by Bill Justis.

In 1969, Roe was presented by the Recording Industry Association of America with a gold record for accumulated sales of over one million copies.

== Chart positions ==
Year	Title / Songwriter(s)	UK	AUS	CAN	U.S.	GER	RIAA Certification
1962	"Sheila" (Tommy Roe)	3	1	1	1	9	Gold

== Cover versions and parodies ==
The Beatles covered the song (with lead vocals by George Harrison) on stage in 1962. On October 25, 1962, a live recording was made for the BBC radio programme Here We Go, to be broadcast the next day. The song was never aired and the recording is now lost. An amateur taping was made at the Star Club in Hamburg in December of that same year. This version was ultimately published in 1977, on the bootleg recording Live! at the Star-Club in Hamburg, Germany; 1962.

French female singer Annie Chancel recorded the song in 1962, and since then used Sheila as her pseudonym. It was released in France by Philips Records.

English band Status Quo covered the song on the U.K. version of their 1968 album Picturesque Matchstickable Messages from the Status Quo, and in the 2003 and 2009 remasterings of the same title.

In 1979, Leif Garrett released a version of the song as a single in Australia, which reached No. 63. It was featured on his album Feel the Need.

The song was also covered by the Greg Kihn Band on their 1981 album RocKihnRoll.

During the 1980s, radio station KKRZ-FM in Portland, Oregon, recorded a parody of the song called "Shut Up Sheela", which mocked Ma Anand Sheela's habit of using profanity in media interviews. At the time, followers of the Bhagwan Shree Rajneesh had attempted to win elected seats in the government of rural Wasco County, Oregon, by bussing in homeless people and encouraging them to vote in county elections. The parody was released on a 45 record, to raise funds to assist in caring for these homeless, many of whom were abandoned after the electoral takeover failed. Several leaders of the Rajneesh movement, including Sheela, were arrested in connection with a bioterror attack perpetrated by members of the group.
