= Alex Carlin =

American rock musician and songwriter

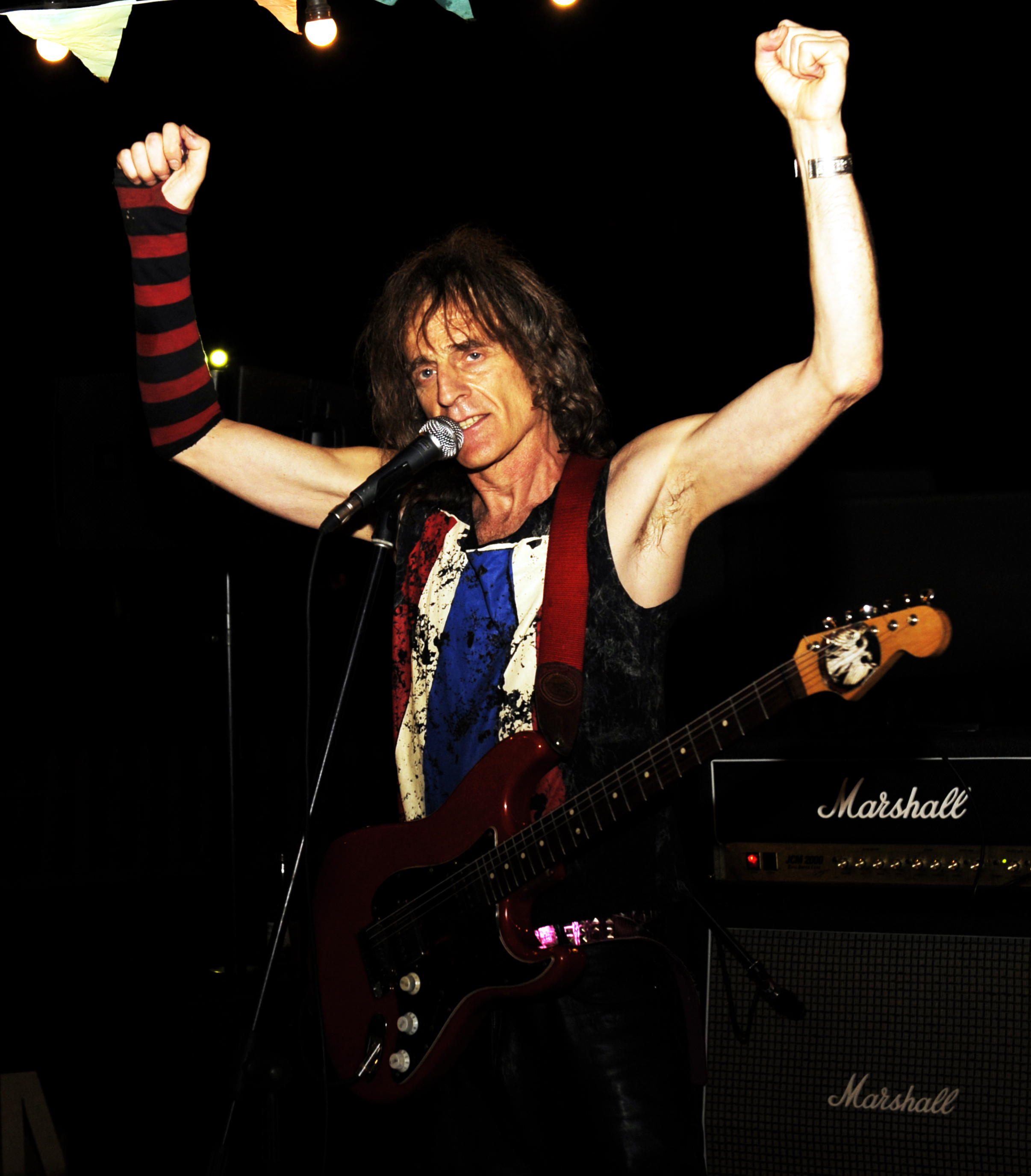
- Alex Carlin, Moscow 2015

Background information
- Born: June 17, 1957 (age 69); Chicago, Illinois, United States
- Genres: Rock and roll; punk rock; power pop; hard rock; indie rock
- Occupations: Musician, singer, songwriter
- Instruments: Guitar, keyboards, vocals

Alex Carlin is an American rock musician and songwriter, best known as a member of seminal California bands The Rubinoos and Psycotic Pineapple, as well as for his solo career. In 2009 he surpassed a Guinness World Record in Radomsko, Poland playing the "Longest Solo Concert" – 32 hours of rock songs.

In 1966, in fifth grade at Cragmont Primary School in Berkeley, California Alex and Jon Rubin formed The Constipated Orange. In seventh grade they met Tommy Dunbar and Greg 'Curly' Keranen (later Jonathan Richman's main bassist) and became the Rubinoos. In the late 1970s the Rubinoos went on to achieve international success with several top 40 hits, while Alex played with Psycotic Pineapple, an influential punk band, co-writing the band's songs with John Seabury, the bass player and a Grammy nominated illustrator and designer, whose work has been featured in the Rock'n'Roll Hall of Fame.

In 1984 "Little Demon," a song co-written by Alex, was performed by Adrian Zmed in the hit comedy film Bachelor Party with Tom Hanks. In the mid 1990s Alex played lead guitar for Cranford Nix. Alex also extensively toured the Soviet Union with his band Alien Beachhead. In 2000, Alex formed Rüt Höst and moved to Europe, where he played over a hundred concerts per year for more than a decade, with Rüt Höst or solo, appearing in most of the European countries. Band members included fusion drummer Atma Anur, known for his work with Journey, drummer Peter Ffrench and bassist J.R. Clegg. In 2006 the Scorpions' bassist Paweł Mąciwoda performed on his recording of "No Sleep, Only Rock and Roll".

In 2012 the group's name became Alex Carlin Band, currently consisting of Alex, drummer Denis Matuizo and bassist Andrey Samoylov, Alisa bassist Peter Samoylov's brother. They have been spending most of their time in Russia, touring all across the country performing in every region as well as neighboring Central Asian republics.
