= Jeopardy (song) =

- French picture sleeve

Single by The Greg Kihn Band

from the album Kihnspiracy
- B-side: "Fascination"
- Released: January 1983
- Studio: Fantasy, Berkeley
- Genre: Power pop; dance-rock
- Length: 3:47
- Label: Beserkley
- Songwriters: Greg Kihn, Steve Wright
- Producer: Matthew King Kaufman

The Greg Kihn Band singles chronology
"Happy Man" (1982)	"Jeopardy" (1983)	"Tear That City Down" (1983)

Music video
- "Jeopardy" on YouTube

"Jeopardy" is a song released by the Greg Kihn Band, from their 1983 album Kihnspiracy. It was the band's only Top 10 hit on the Billboard Hot 100 singles chart, reaching number 2 in May 1983 (behind Michael Jackson's "Beat It").

It hit #1 on the Billboard Hot Club Dance Play chart in April 1983 and crossed over to the Top 50 of Billboard's Soul chart. The song also reached number 63 on the UK Singles Chart, becoming the band's only charting song in the UK. The song was composed in D minor.

== Background ==
Kihn came up with the song with Steve Wright in 1981. Wright had purchased a new Casio keyboard and came up with a riff on it. Kihn came up with what would be the song's chorus and the duo finished the song 15 minutes later. The band recorded a demo not long after, and played the song live at a concert in Chicago. The reception was so positive that they recorded the song shortly after, and did so in just two takes.

== Music video ==
A music video was made for the song. In the video, a wedding takes place and a groom (Kihn) gets cold feet after seeing various couples handcuffed or otherwise fused together. Eventually, the groom lifts the veil on his bride, and its revealed she's a zombie, and everyone in the church turns into zombie as well as the groom fights them and a giant monster off. Eventually, it's all revealed to be the groom's worries before the wedding and he walks out of the church to drive off. His bride incidentally does as well, and they drive off together.

The music video was directed by Joe Dea and filmed in the Dolores Mission in San Francisco. The idea for the video was conceived over a lunch meeting between Kihn, Dea, and Berzerkley Records owner Matthew King Kaufman, when Kihn mentioned his love of horror movies, and Dea thought up the horror movie wedding idea, which Kihn approved. Kihn said that the video was shot over two or three days, in which considerable amounts of drugs and alcohol were consumed by the band.

The music video for the band's 1984 song "Reunited" was a sequel for this video.

== Parody ==
A parody of the song, titled "I Lost on Jeopardy", was released by "Weird Al" Yankovic on his 1984 album "Weird Al" Yankovic in 3-D. Kihn made a cameo appearance in the song's music video, driving the car into which Yankovic is thrown after being "ejected" from the Jeopardy! game show, parodying the end of his own video. The car's license plate reads "LOSER" instead of "LIPS". The bride still pops the cork of the champagne bottle and the video ends. Art Fleming and Don Pardo—host and announcer, respectively, of the original version of Jeopardy!—also make cameo appearances.

Kihn said he enjoyed the parody and considered it an honor to be parodied.

== Charts ==
=== Weekly charts ===
Chart (1983)	Peak position
Australia (Kent Music Report)	11
Belgium (Ultratop 50 Flanders)	22
Canada Top Singles (RPM)	4
France (IFOP)	13
Germany (GfK)	18
Ireland (IRMA)	17
Italy (FIMI)	8
Netherlands (Dutch Top 40)	15
Netherlands (Single Top 100)	21
New Zealand (Recorded Music NZ)	17
South Africa (Springbok Radio)	6
Sweden (Sverigetopplistan)	8
Switzerland (Schweizer Hitparade)	4
UK Singles (Official Charts)	63
US Billboard Hot 100	2
US Billboard Hot Black Singles	48
US Billboard Hot Dance Club Play	1
US Billboard Mainstream Rock Tracks	5
US Cash Box	5

=== Year-end charts ===
Chart (1983)	Rank
Australia (Kent Music Report)	83
Canada Top Singles (RPM)	25
France (IFOP)	52
Italy (FIMI)	60
US Billboard Hot 100	21
US Cash Box	35

== See also ==
- List of number-one dance singles of 1983 (U.S.)
