= The Smirks =

English new wave band

- Origin: Manchester, England
- Genres: Punk, new wave, power pop
- Years active: 1977–1980
- Labels: Beserkley, Smirksong
- Members: Simon Milner – lead vocal and guitar Neil Fitzpatrick – lead guitar and vocals Mike Doherty – drums Ian Morris – bass and backing vocals
- Website: thesmirks.com

The Smirks were an English new wave band from Manchester who played from the late 1970s to the early 1980s. Although they failed to meet with commercial success, they built a small but loyal base of fans.

They are remembered mostly for a quirky vocal style and for a curious campaign Smirks against Travolta, simultaneously a homage and a parody of Rock Against Racism. The Smirks session for the John Peel show was recorded on 19 April 1978 and broadcast a week later.

Despite being more of the new wave/power pop genre, they did support Killing Joke and Joy Division at the ULU gig in London, 1980.

Their acrimonious dispute with Beserkley Records, for whom they recorded an album that was never released, is also noteworthy and was the subject of a BBC Radio 4 documentary. The album was finally due to be released in October 2007, but was delayed by the sale of Sanctuary Records to Universal Music and is still awaiting release.

== Parody ==
Smirks against Travolta was only one example of the band's use of parody, though the campaign had a serious side: keeping live music venues alive against the increasing incidence of discos with only recorded music. Their slogan The most fun you can have with your shoes on was a parody of Beserkley's The most fun you can have with your clothes on, while after Beserkley, their choice of Smirksong as a label name was a parody of Led Zeppelin's Swan Song Records, while the DHSS prefix to their own label's release suggested the Government department dealing with the unemployed, as the band no longer had a contract.

== Other projects ==
Ian Morris and Mike Doherty both played on the demos for the Jilted John single. Ian Morris and Simon Milner later released a single under the pseudonym Captain Mog and Private Sigh. Mike Doherty went on to play for The Freshies. Simon formed The Bernhardts, a predecessor to The Oscar Bernhardt Ensemble, who play 1930's and 1940s Swing and Latin Music. Ian Morris, now presents a show on ALL FM called Standing in the Shadows of Lev. Neil Fitzpatrick and Simon Milner were part of the group Distant Cousins, who released two albums with Doreen Edwards.

== Discography ==
- 1978: 7" single "OK – UK" / "Streets" (Beserkley Records BZZ 17)
- 1978: 7" single "Rosemary"/ "Up Eh Up" (Beserkley Records BZZ 23)
- 1978: album Andrew Jaspan presents The Smirks (Beserkley Records BSERK 19) (unreleased)
- 1979: 7" EP "American Patriots" / "Angry With Myself" / "Penetration" (Smirksong Records DHSS 01)
- 1979: 7" single "To You" / "New Music" (Smirksong Records DHSS 02)
- 1979: 7" single "Joe And His Mates" / "She's Out of Love" (unreleased)
