= John Massaro (guitarist) =

American guitarist

John Massaro (born John Vincent Hazlett) was a guitarist for the 1980s band Kid Lightning.

In the 1970s at Centaurus High School he played in the band Jefferson. He went on to play in Steve Miller Band for two years, contributing to the Abracadabra album. Massaro also co-wrote several songs with Lee Ritenour.

Massaro currently resides in Lafayette, Colorado, playing with Forty Nights.
