= The Rubinoos =

American power pop band

- Origin: Berkeley, California, United States
- Genres: Pop rock, power pop, art rock
- Years active: 1970–1985; 1999–present
- Labels: Yep Roc; Wild Punk; Air Mail; Beserkley; Warner Bros. Castle; Wounded Bird
- Members: Jon Rubin; Tommy Dunbar; Donn Spindt; Al Chan
- Past members: Greg 'Curly' Keranen; Alex Carlin; Ralph Granich; Danny Woods; Tom Carpender; Royse Ader; Michael Boyd
- Website: Official site

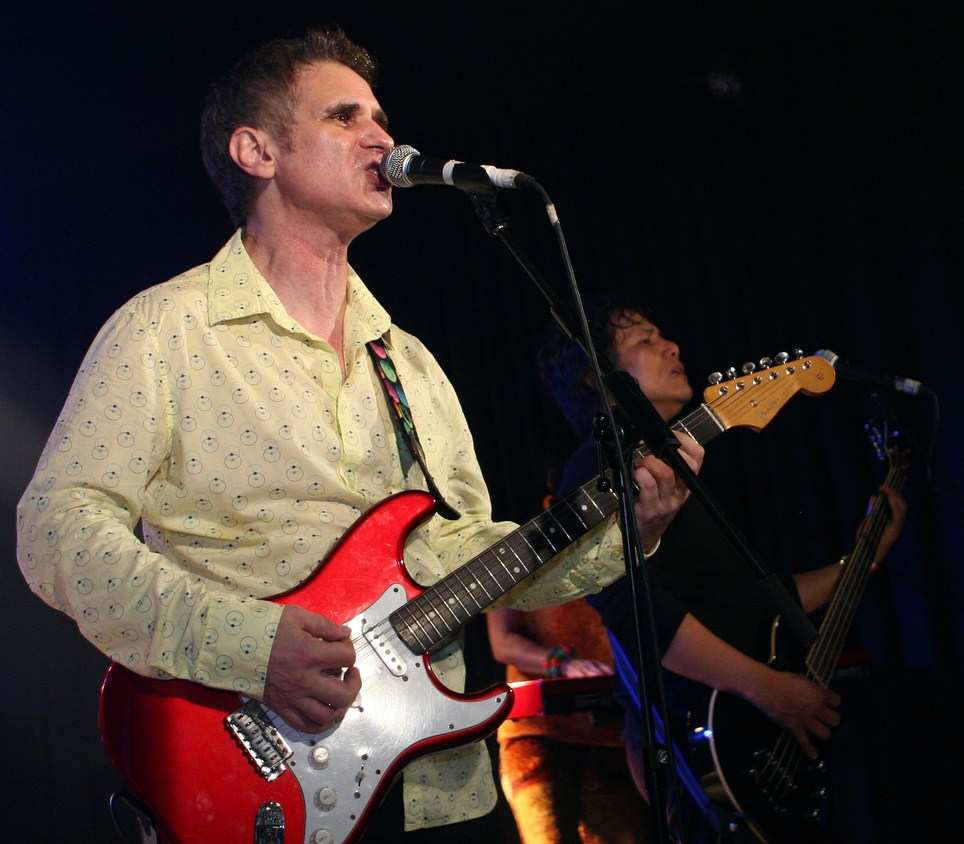
The Rubinoos in Barcelona on February 5, 2009.

The Rubinoos is an American power pop band, formed in 1970 in Berkeley, California. They are perhaps best known for their singles "I Think We're Alone Now" (1977, a cover of the hit by Tommy James & the Shondells), "I Wanna Be Your Boyfriend" (1979), and for the theme song to the 1984 film Revenge of the Nerds. Although "I Think We're Alone Now" has been their highest charting hit, reaching No.45 in 1977, the group has a significant enduring cult following among fans of the power pop genre.

== History ==
=== 1970–1977: Formation and The Rubinoos ===
In November 1970, Tommy Dunbar and Jon Rubin formed the Rubinoos to play at a dance for Bay High School in Berkeley, California. Other founding members included Greg 'Curly' Keranen, Alex Carlin, Ralph Granich and Danny Wood. Inspired by siblings' 45s and the Cruisin' vintage radio recreations LP series, Jon Rubin and the Rubinoos played rock and roll oldies. Songs included covers of Chubby Checker, Bill Haley and the Comets, the Dovells, the Troggs, Little Eva, the Chiffons, and others.

Soon after the performance at Bay High School, where Rubin and Dunbar were enrolled, the original band dissolved. In May 1971, they shortened the name to the Rubinoos and reformed as a quartet with Donn Spindt on drums and Tom Carpender on bass. The group now focused on original material by Dunbar, in association with Rubin and others.

The band's early development was assisted and inspired by the success of Earth Quake, whose lead guitarist and principal songwriter was Tommy Dunbar's older brother, Robbie Dunbar. The Rubinoos often appeared as an opening act for Earth Quake in clubs, such as Berkeley's Longbranch Saloon and the Keystone Berkeley.

After the expiration of their contract with A&M Records, Earth Quake, along with their manager, Matthew King Kaufman, founded Beserkley Records and started recruiting additional talent. This included Greg Kihn, Jonathan Richman and the Rubinoos.

In June 1973, Greg 'Curly' Keranen re-joined the group. In September 1974, they recorded a cover of the DeFranco Family's "Gorilla", released as a single and included on the Beserkley Chartbusters compilation album. The group also provided accompaniment for Jonathan Richman on two Chartbuster cuts, "The New Teller" and "Government Center." Shortly after the release of "Chartbusters" Keranen left the Rubinoos to join Jonathan Richman & the Modern Lovers. He was replaced by Royse Ader.

One 'high point' of the band's early career included a performance at Bill Graham's Winterland Ballroom, September 24, 1974, on a bill with the Jefferson Starship. At this concert, the Rubinoos were joined on stage by Jonathan Richman, who danced to their version of the Archies' "Sugar, Sugar". This was greeted with intense booing and a pelting of unripe bananas by members of the audience. Their closer "The Pepsi Generation Theme Song" provoked an even more hostile reaction from the crowd. However, the band was the first mentioned and main focus of all the reviews of the concert.

In 1977, Beserkley released The Rubinoos, the group's eponymous debut album. It was well-reviewed and New York Rocker called it "The Best Pop Album of the Decade." The single, a cover of Tommy James' "I Think We're Alone Now," reached No. 45 on the Billboard Hot 100 becoming Beserkley's first hit. The group appeared on American Bandstand (live), So It Goes (by video) and Rolling Stone Magazine: The 10th Anniversary television special in which they were cast as a garage band, performed a tribute to the newly deceased Elvis Presley and morphed into claymation figures. Along with these accomplishments, The Rubinoos had a number one single in Modesto, California, for 13 weeks, one of their concerts was raffled off to a high school by Burger King, and they appeared in Tiger Beat and 16 Magazine many times.

=== 1978–2006: Breakup and reformation ===
The group's next album, Back to the Drawing Board (1979), featured the single "I Wanna Be Your Boyfriend," which had been released in 1978 and received heavy airplay in England and Europe. In support of this album, the Rubinoos appeared on Rock Goes To College, The Old Grey Whistle Test, Top Pop and opened 56 shows for Elvis Costello on the U.S. portion of his 1979 Armed Funk tour.

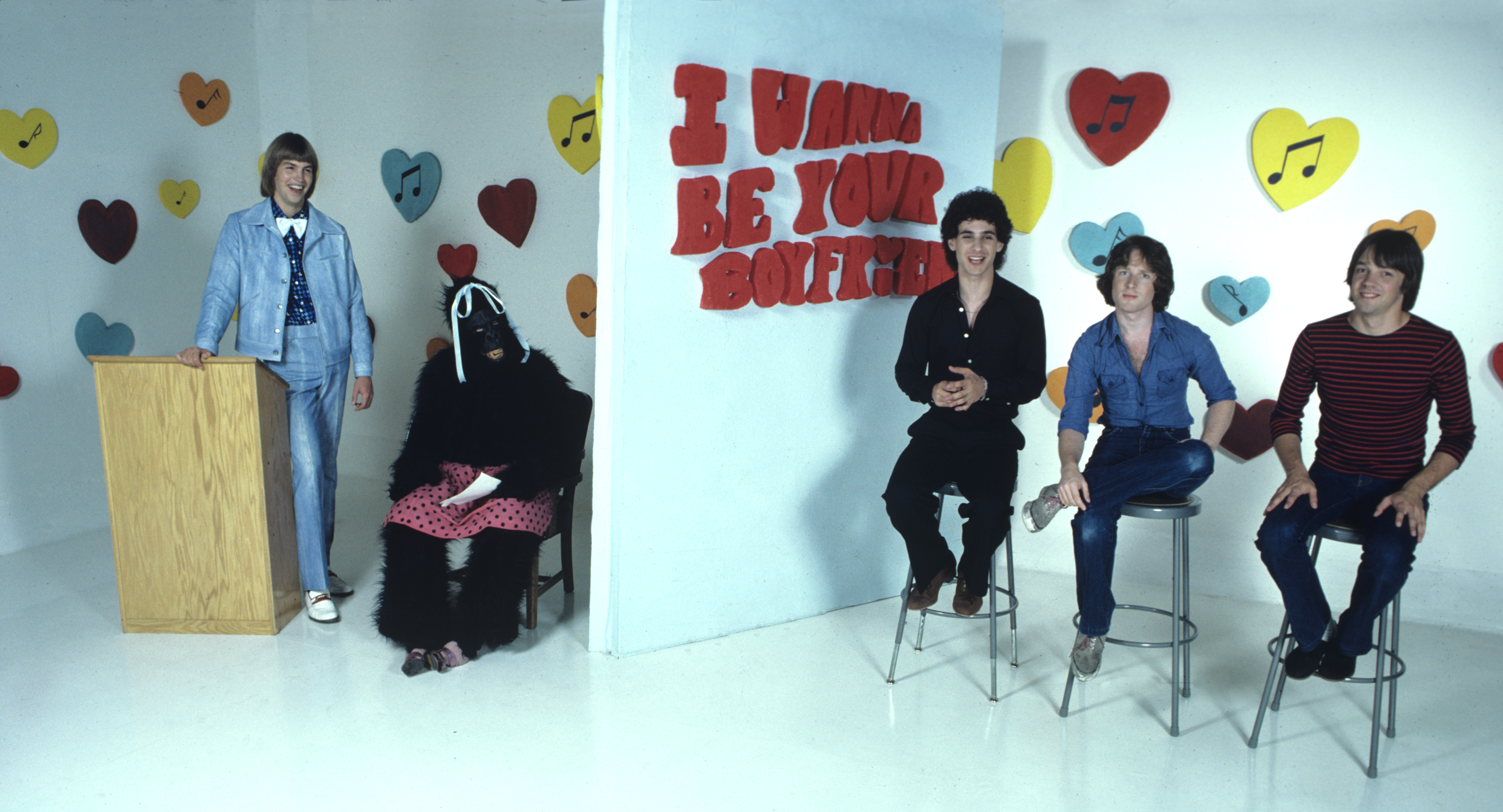
Rubinoos 1978

In 1980 Royse Ader was replaced by Al Chan. The Rubinoos then recorded the demos for a third album which never came to fruition. These demos, released in the 1990s as Basement Tapes, engineered by well known audio guru, Dan Alexander, is still thought to be one of their best efforts. Spindt and Chan left the group in 1982 when Tommy and Jon decided to move to Los Angeles. In 1983, the group, now consisting of just Rubin and Dunbar, signed with Warner Bros. Records and released the Mini LP Party of Two, produced by Todd Rundgren. Party of Two yielded the single and cult classic music video "If I Had You Back," which received heavy rotation on MTV and VH1. In 1984, they recorded the title song "Revenge of the Nerds" and "Breakdown" for the film Revenge of the Nerds.

The Rubinoos began a long sabbatical in 1985. In 1989, Dunbar, Spindt, Chan, and John Seabury formed the group Vox Pop and recorded an album of material, co produced by Dunbar and Dan Alexander at Alexanders Coast Recorders. Also in 1989, Jon Rubin joined the noted Los Angeles a cappella Doo Wop group the Mighty Echoes. During the 1990s, two compilation CDs, Basement Tapes and Garage Sale, were released. Their success led to the end of the Rubinoos sabbatical and a new album, Paleophonic (1999), produced by Kevin Gilbert. This album did not see the light of day until the Rubinoos' performance, their first in seven years, at the 1999 International Pop Overthrow Festival in Los Angeles. The lineup at IPO featured Rubin, Dunbar, Chan and Spindt. In 2000 Tommy and Jon were hired to sing the Flo and Eddie parts of Frank Zappa's 200 Motels at three concerts with the Netherlands' Philharmonic. In 2002, the Rubinoos toured Spain and Japan, released the all-covers Crimes Against Music (2002) and recorded the album Live in Japan (2004). In 2005, the group reunited with their original producer, Gary Phillips, to record Twist Pop Sin (2006). In 2007, Castle Communications issued the 63-song retrospective Everything You Always Wanted to Know About the Rubinoos. Also in 2007, the Rubinoos toured Japan and released a two CD compilation titled One Two That's It. In 2009, the band toured Spain and released the compilation CD HodgePodge which featured one newly recorded track, a cover of the Hollies' classic, "Bus Stop."

=== 2007–present: Back to the Basics ===
In July 2007, Dunbar and songwriter James Gangwer filed a lawsuit for infringement of copyright against singer-songwriter Avril Lavigne for her 2007 single "Girlfriend"; producer Dr. Luke, RCA Records, and Apple were also named as defendants in the suit. Dunbar and Gangwer alleged that Lavigne plagiarized the Rubinoos' 1979 single "I Wanna Be Your Boyfriend". Lavigne denied these accusations and claimed that she had never even heard of the Rubinoos before. In January 2008, an undisclosed settlement was reached between the two parties. Dunbar and Gangwer later released a statement in which they claimed to "completely exonerate" Lavigne and Dr. Luke from any wrongdoing.

The Rubinoos 1980

Music critic John M. Borack called Paleophonic No. 36 in his list of the best power pop albums of all time, praising its "trademark pitch-perfect harmonies".

In January 2010, the Rubinoos played their first kids show in support of their first all-ages CD, Biff-Boff-Boing. The CD is a mix of covers and new originals.

In May 2010, to coincide with their Spain/Italy tour, the Rubinoos released their first new original album in five years—Automatic Toaster, produced by Robbie Rist.

In 2015, to celebrate their 45th anniversary the band released the appropriately titled album 45. They continued to tour in Europe and Japan with a few sporadic dates in the US.

In 2018, the group signed with Yep Roc Records, their first exclusive record deal since the 1980s. Long-time fan and noted singer-songwriter Chuck Prophet was tapped to produce. The album, From Home, released in 2019, was recorded with the same technique as their first sessions, playing all at once in the same room, recorded to analog tape. This was done at Hyde Street Studios in San Francisco, formerly Wally Heider Studios, where the group made some of its first recordings.

With the onset of the Covid epidemic in 2020, the Rubinoos' live performing schedule was put on hold for a couple of years. In June 2021, Yep Roc Records released a live to two track recording of the Rubinoos done in 1976 at CBS Folsom Street Studios in San Francisco, entitled The CBS Tapes. The album includes three never released original songs and eight rare covers. This was followed by a re-issue of the group's eponymous first LP, The Rubinoos, which was a Record Store Day selection. In September 2021, the group scored a placement of their hit version of "I Think We're Alone Now" on the Season Three premier of the Netflix hit comedy Sex Education.

In 2022, the band had their cult classic "Rock and Roll is Dead" used as end title music for the first episode of the HBO hit Irma Vep. In July, the Rubinoos resumed live performing, starting with a bang up show at the Oakland California Punk/Pop festival Mosswood Meltdown. The surge of Covid at the end of 2022 slowed live performing for a bit longer.

In 2023, Yep Roc Records re-issued the group's second LP, Back to the Drawing Board, which was also a featured pick at Record Store Day. In October, the Rubinoos set out for Europe to headline the Caravaca Power Pop Festival and tour of Spain.

in 2024 the Rubinoos are scheduled to return to Europe for a multi-country tour and a summer tour of the East Coast of the United States.

== Members ==
Current lineup

- Jon Rubin – vocals, guitar (1970–present)
- Tommy Dunbar – guitar, vocals (1970–present)
- Donn "Donno" Spindt – drums, vocals (1971–present)
- Al Chan – bass, vocals (1980–present)

Former touring musicians

- Susie Davis – keyboards, vocals (2002–2009)
- David Rokeach – drums (2007–2009)
- Nick D'Virgilio – drums, vocals (2002–2006)

Former members

- Greg 'Curly' Keranen – bass, vocals (1970–1971, 1973–1975)
- Alex Carlin – organ (1970–1971)
- Ralph Granich – drums (1970–1971)
- Danny Woods – saxophone (1970–1971)
- Tom Carpender – bass, vocals (1971–1973)
- Royse Ader – bass, vocals (1975–1980)
- Michael Boyd – keyboards, vocals (1981–1982)

== Discography ==
=== Studio albums ===
- The Rubinoos (1977)
- Back to the Drawing Board (1979)
- Party of Two EP (1983)
- Basement Tapes (recorded 1980) (1993)
- Paleophonic (1998)
- Crimes Against Music (2003)
- Twist Pop Sin (2006)
- Biff-Boff-Boing (children's CD) (2010)
- Automatic Toaster (2010)
- 45 (2015)
- From Home (2019)
- CBS Tapes (recorded November 3, 1976) (2021)

=== Compilations ===
- Bezerk Times (1978)
- Spitballs (Beserkley, 1978; multi-artist compilation)
- Garage Sale (1994)
- The Basement Tapes Plus (1999)
- Anthology (2002)
- Everything You Always Wanted to Know About the Rubinoos (2007) (3-CD box set)
- One Two That's It (2008)
- HodgePodge (2009)
- The Best of The Rubinoos (2014?)

=== Live albums ===
- Live in Japan (2004)
- A Night Of All Covers – Live At Koenji High, Tokyo (2018)
