= The Greg Kihn Band =

American rock band (1976–2019)

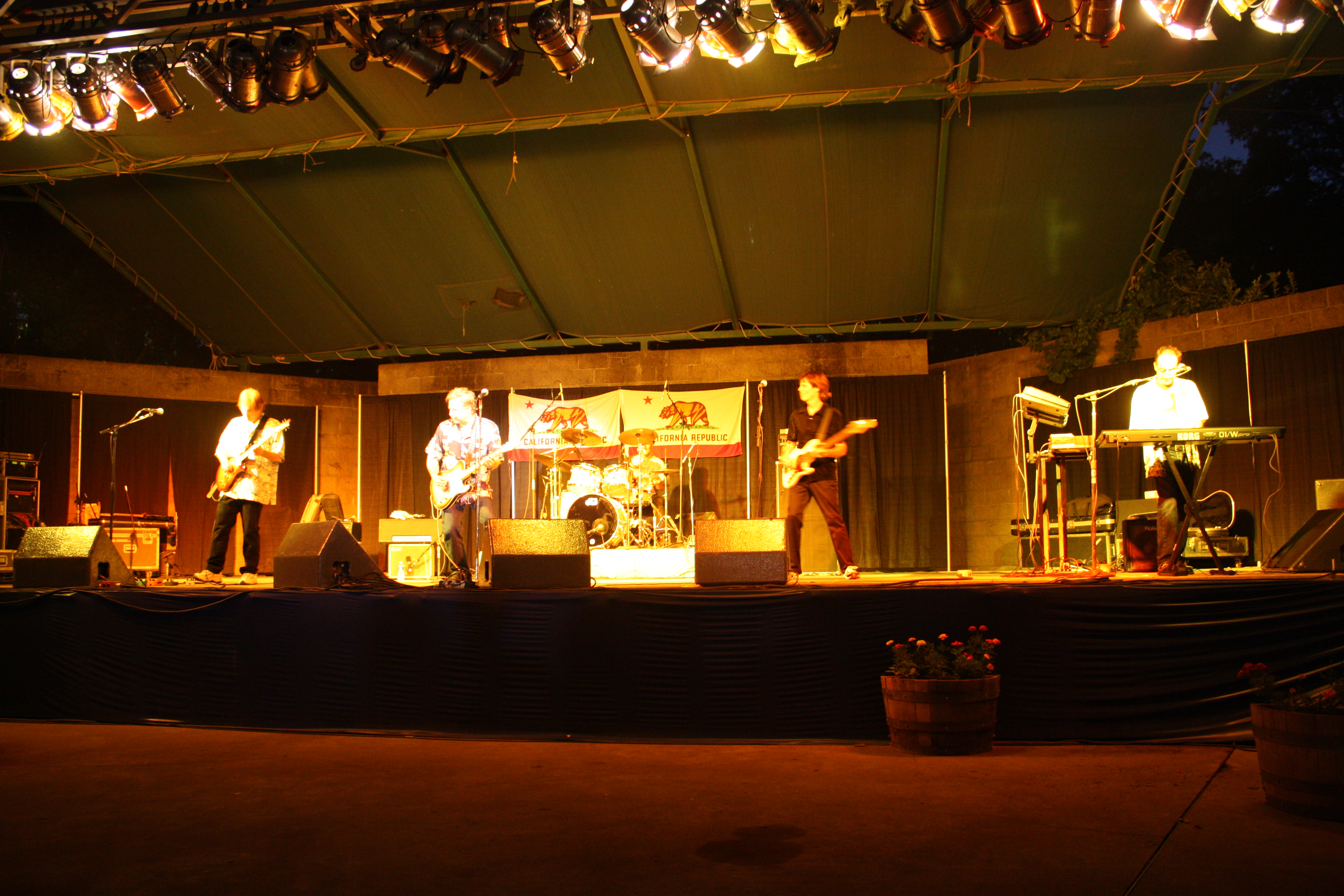
- The Greg Kihn Band in 2008

Background information
- Origin: San Francisco, California, U.S.
- Genres: Rock; pop rock; power pop
- Years active: 1976–2019
- Label: Beserkley
- Past members: Greg Kihn; Ry Kihn; Robert Berry; Dave Danza; Dave "Bro" Lauser; Steve Wright; Larry Lynch; Robbie Dunbar; Dave Carpender; Gary Phillips; Greg Douglass; Tyler Eng; Dennis Murphy; Craig Kirchoff; Pat Mosca; Joe Satriani; Jimmy Lyon
- Website: gregkihn.com

The Greg Kihn Band was an American rock band that was started by frontman Greg Kihn and bassist Steve Wright. Their most successful singles include "The Breakup Song (They Don't Write 'Em)" (Billboard Hot 100 #15) and "Jeopardy" (Billboard Hot 100 #2). The band's musical style and genres comprise rock, pop rock and power pop.

== History ==
Promotional photo of The Greg Kihn Band in 1983. From left to right: Larry Lynch, Gary Phillips, Greg Kihn, Greg Douglass, Steve Wright.

Greg Kihn began his career as a singer-songwriter in his hometown of Baltimore, Maryland. He started writing songs and playing coffee houses while still in high school in the Baltimore area. When he was 17 his mother submitted a tape of one of his original songs to the talent contest of local Top 40 radio station WCAO, in which he took first prize and won a typewriter, a stack of records, and a Vox electric guitar.

He moved to San Francisco in 1972 and worked painting houses, singing in the streets, and working behind the counter at a Berkeley record store with future bandmate and Earth Quake keyboardist Gary Phillips. The following year, he was signed to Matthew "King" Kaufman's Beserkley Records. Along with Jonathan Richman, Earth Quake, and The Rubinoos, Kihn helped to develop the label's sound.

In 1976, after his debut on the compilation album Beserkley Chartbusters Vol. 1, Kihn formed the Greg Kihn Band, with Steve Wright on bass. Wright became the most influential member of the Greg Kihn band, co-writing Kihn's songs. Kihn recorded his first album, Greg Kihn, with his own band, now named The Greg Kihn Band, consisting of Wright, Robbie Dunbar on guitar, and Larry Lynch on drums.

Dunbar, already a member of Earth Quake, was replaced by Dave Carpender in time to record their second album, Greg Kihn Again. The lineup of Kihn, Wright, Lynch, and Carpender lasted until 1982 (changing to a quintet in 1981 with the addition of Phillips). Guitarist Greg Douglass replaced Carpender before the band's 1983 Kihnspiracy album.

Throughout the 1970s, Kihn released an album each year and became better known during promotional touring, becoming Beserkley's biggest seller. In 1981, Kihn earned a Top 20 single, "The Breakup Song (They Don't Write 'Em)," from the RocKihnRoll album.

Kihn continued in a more commercial vein through the 1980s with a series of pun-titled albums: Kihntinued (1982), Kihnspiracy (1983), Kihntagious (1984), and Citizen Kihn (1985). His second successful single was 1983's "Jeopardy" (rising to number two) from the Kihnspiracy album. "Jeopardy" was spoofed by "Weird Al" Yankovic as "I Lost on Jeopardy" on Yankovic's album "Weird Al" Yankovic in 3-D. Kihn made a cameo appearance in the music video. In 1983, the groundbreaking "Jeopardy" video became an MTV favorite.

In 1985, Kihn broke with Beserkley Records and signed with EMI. Matthew Kaufman continued to produce Kihn's albums. "Lucky" (1985) broke the top thirty and a video sequel was made to the original "Jeopardy" video. In 1986 Joe Satriani replaced Greg Douglass on lead guitar, Tyler Eng replaced Larry Lynch on drums, and Pat Mosca replaced Gary Phillips on keyboards. This is the lineup that went into the studio to record the 1986 album Love and Rock and Roll. Satriani left the band to pursue his solo career in 1987 and was replaced by former Eddie Money lead guitarist Jimmy Lyon. Greg Kihn returned to Baltimore to record a pair of solo acoustic albums at the studios of his friend Jack Heyrman for Clean Cuts Records, Mutiny in 1994 and Horror Show in 1996.

The Greg Kihn Band continued to play with a lineup consisting of Greg's son Ry Kihn on lead guitar, Dave Danza (from Eddie Money) on drums, Dave Medd (from The Tubes) on keyboards, and Robert Berry (from Hush) on bass. Every year, KFOX FM hosts a concert at the Shoreline Amphitheatre in Mountain View, California, called the "Kihncert" featuring The Greg Kihn Band. The Kihncert always featured Greg Kihn as the show opener and sometime emcee, along with other KFOX FM air personalities. In addition to the Kihncert, Greg Kihn performed private, public, charity and KFOX FM-sponsored or promoted events. The band's last activity was in 2019.

Gary Phillips died of cancer in 2007 at the age of 59. On August 13, 2024, Greg Kihn died after a long battle with Alzheimer's disease at the age of 75.

== Members ==
- Greg Kihn – lead vocals, guitar (1976–2019; died 2024)
- Larry Lynch – drums, backing vocals (1976–1986)
- Steve Wright – bass, backing vocals, keyboards (1976–1996; died 2017)
- Dave Carpender – guitar (1976–1983; died 2007)
- Robbie Dunbar – guitars, backing vocals, keyboards (1976–1977)
- Gary Phillips – keyboards, backing vocals (1981–1986; died 2007)
- Greg Douglass – guitar, backing vocals (1983–1986)
- Tyler Eng – drums (1986–1996)
- Pat Mosca – keyboards (1986–1996)
- Joe Satriani – guitar (1986–1987)
- Jimmy Lyon – guitar (1987–1996)
- Ry Kihn – guitar, backing vocals (1996–2019)
- David Medd – keyboards, backing vocals (1996–2019)
- Robert Berry – bass, backing vocals (1996–2004, 2008–2019)
- Dave Danza – drums (1996–2019)
- Dennis Murphy – bass (2004–2008)

== Discography ==
=== Albums ===
Year	Album	Billboard 200	AUS
1976	Greg Kihn	—	—
1977	Greg Kihn Again	—	—
1978	Next of Kihn	145	85
1979	With the Naked Eye	114	—
1980	Glass House Rock	167	—
1981	RocKihnRoll	32	72
1982	Kihntinued	33	—
1983	Kihnspiracy	15	76
1984	Kihntagious	121	—
1985	Citizen Kihn	51	—
1986	Love and Rock and Roll	—	—
1989	KihnSolidation: The Best of Greg Kihn	—	—
1991	Unkihntrollable (Greg Kihn Live)	—	—
1992	Kihn of Hearts	—	—
1994	Mutiny	—	—
1996	King Biscuit Flower Hour	—	—
1996	Horror Show	—	—
2000	True Kihnfessions	—	—
2004	Jeopardy	—	—
2006	Greg Kihn Live, Featuring Ry Kihn	—	—
2011	Kihnplete (Post Beserkley Records)	—	—
2012	Greg Kihn Band: Best of Beserkley, '75–'84	—	—
2017	Rekihndled	—	—

=== Chart singles ===
Year	Song	US Hot 100	US M.S.R.	US Dance	AUS	Canada	GER	UK	Album
1978	"Remember"	105	–	–	–	–	–	–	Next of Kihn
1981	"The Breakup Song (They Don't Write 'Em)"	15	5	–	14	25	–	–	Rockihnroll
1981	"Sheila"	102	39	–	–	–	–	–	Rockihnroll
1981	"The Girl Most Likely"	104	57	–	55	–	–	–	Rockihnroll
1982	"Testify"	–	5	–	–	–	–	–	Kihntinued
1982	"Happy Man"	62	30	–	68	–	–	–	Kihntinued
1982	"Every Love Song"	82	–	–	–	–	–	–	Kihntinued
1983	"Jeopardy"	2	5	1	11	4	18	63	Kihnspiracy
1983	"Love Never Fails"	59	–	–	–	–	–	–	Kihnspiracy
1984	"Reunited"	101	9	–	–	–	–	–	Kihntagious
1984	"Rock"	107	–	–	–	–	–	–	Kihntagious
1985	"Lucky"	30	24	16	–	92	–	–	Citizen Kihn
1985	"Boys Won't (Leave the Girls Alone)"	110	–	–	–	–	–	–	Citizen Kihn
1986	"Love and Rock and Roll"	92	50	–	–	–	–	–	Love and Rock and Roll

=== Music videos ===
Year	Video	Director	Album
1981	"The Breakup Song (They Don't Write 'Em)"		Rockihnroll
1982	"Happy Man"	Joe Dea	Kihntinued
1983	"Jeopardy"	Joe Dea	Kihnspiracy
1983	"Tear That City Down"	Bob Hart	Kihnspiracy
1984	"Reunited"	Joe Dea	Kihntagious
1985	"Lucky"	Joe Dea	Citizen Kihn
1985	"Boys Won't (Leave the Girls Alone)"	Joe Dea	Citizen Kihn
1986	"Love and Rock and Roll"		Love and Rock and Roll
