= Earth Quake (band) =

American power pop band

- Origin: Berkeley, California, United States
- Genres: Power pop
- Years active: 1966–1980s
- Labels: Beserkley Records; Acadia Records, A&M Records
- Members: John Doukas; Robbie Dunbar; Stan Miller; Steve Nelson; Gary Phillips

Earth Quake is an American power pop band, formed in the San Francisco area in 1966, who released several albums in the 1970s, mostly on Beserkley Records, a company which they were involved in setting up.

== Career ==
Originally Purple Earthquake, the band drew its influences from rock and blues bands of the 1950s and 1960s, such as The Kinks, Muddy Waters and the Yardbirds, and played clubs and ballrooms in California in the late 1960s. They were managed by Matthew King Kaufman, who got a recording contract for them with A&M Records, where they released two albums, Earth Quake (1971) and Why Don't You Try Me? (1972), but with little commercial success.

After experiencing frustration at what he saw as A&M's incompetence in handling the band, and winning some compensation for the unauthorized use of their music in the movie The Getaway, Kaufman set up Beserkley Records in 1973. Earth Quake released four albums on Beserkley between 1975 and 1979, as well as working with other musicians including Jonathan Richman (who they backed on his 1974 recording of "Roadrunner"), Greg Kihn (who sang backing vocals on some of their records), and guitarist Gary Phillips (a.k.a. Gary Phillips, previously of John Cipollina's Copperhead). The band split up in the early 1980s, although a compilation album, Sittin in the Middle of Madness, was issued in 2000.

The first two albums, Earth Quake (1971) and Why Don't You Try Me? (1972), were remastered and re-released December 27, 2004 on Acadia Records.

Gary Phillips died in 2007, at the age of 59. John Doukas, musician and historical documentary director and producer, died on March 19, 2011, in South Africa, at the age of 62. Bassplayer/vocalist Stan Miller died injured August 2019. Drummer Steve Nelson died in January 2020. As of September 15, 2025, Robbie Dunbar is the soul survivor of the Original Earth Quake.

== Band Members 1974-1980 ==
- John Doukas - lead vocals
- Robbie Dunbar - guitar, piano, vocals
- Stan Miller - bass, vocals
- Steve Nelson - percussion, vocals
- Gary Phillips (1975–1977) - guitar, vocals, lead vocals

== Albums ==
- Earth Quake (A&M, 1971)
- Why Don't You Try Me? (A&M, 1972)
- Rocking The World (Beserkley, 1975)
- 8.5 (Beserkley, 1976)
- Leveled (Beserkley, 1977)
- Spitballs (Beserkley, 1978; multi-artist compilation)
- Two Years In A Padded Cell (Beserkley, 1979)
- Sittin in the Middle of Madness (compilation, Castle Music, 2000, reissued 2003)

== Earth Quake 2016 -2022 formed by Robbie Dunbar ==
With the permission of Stan Miller and Steve Nelson, Robbie Dunbar formed a new Earth Quake lineup.

=== Band Members 2016-2022 ===
- Robbie Dunbar - guitar, keyboards, vocals
- Johnny Odea - lead vocals
- Larry Lynch - drums, vocals
- Jimmy Jet Spalding - bass, vocals
- Scotty London - guitar, vocals

== Earth Quake 2016 - 2022 ==
Performed at a variety of venues in Northern California, mostly in the Bay Area.

== Earth Quake 2022 to present, formed by Robbie Dunbar ==
Earth Quake 2022 to Present has since 2022 recorded original songs regularly at 25th Street Recording/Oakland.

=== Band Members 2022 to Present ===
- Robbie Dunbar - guitar, keyboards, vocals
- Jesse Bradman - lead vocals
- Jimmy Jet Spalding - bass, vocals
- Larry Lynch - drums, vocals (from Greg Kihn Band; FAVES Bandleader)

== Singles and Videos ==
The band has released several Singles and Videos.

- Out On The Floor
- The Way You Do It
- Everywhere I Go
- Fever Dream (The Driving Song)
