= Greg Kihn =

American musician and writer (1949–2024)

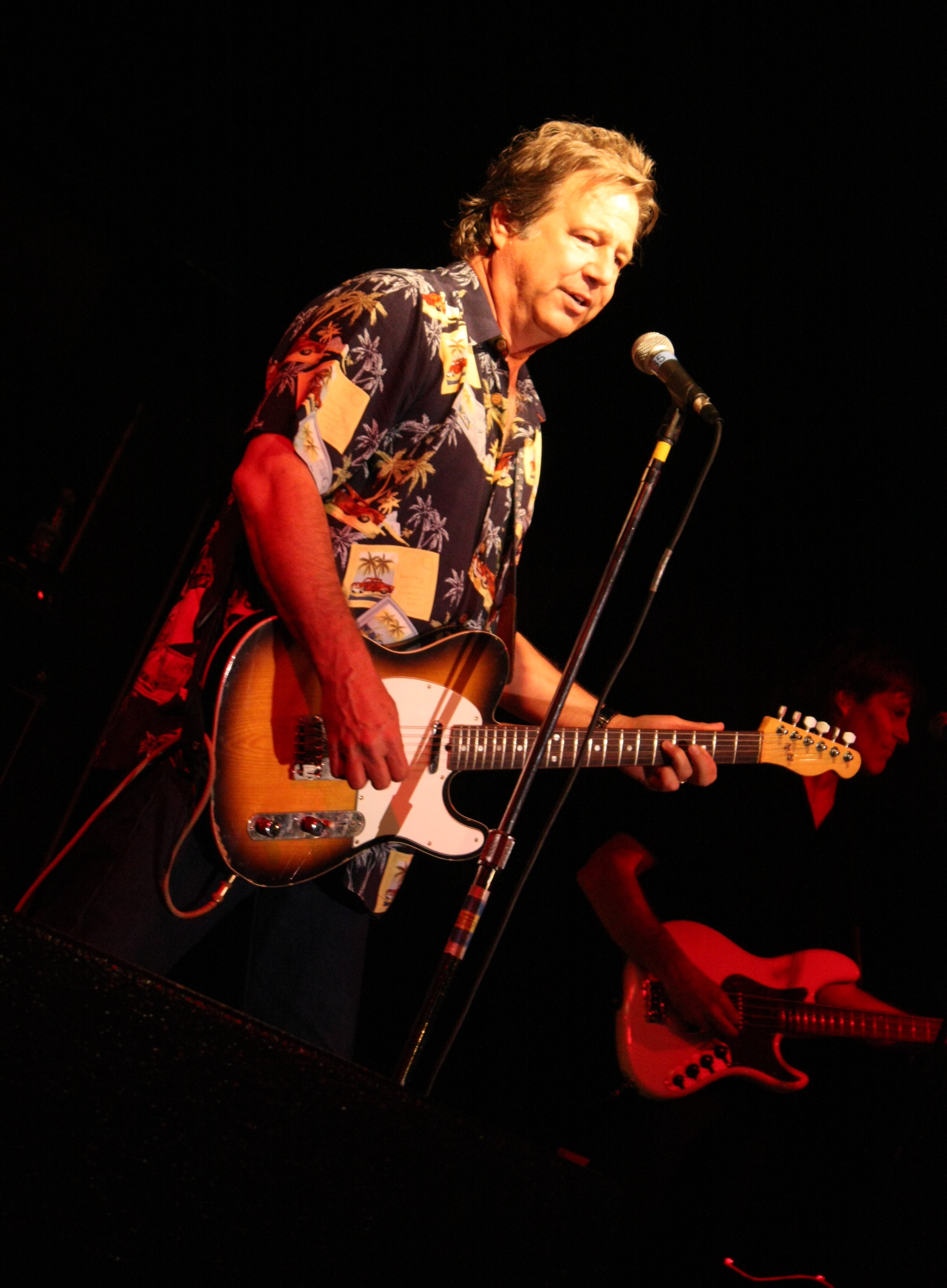
- Kihn in 2008

Background information
- Born: Gregory Stanley Kihn; July 10, 1949; Baltimore, Maryland, U.S.
- Died: August 13, 2024 (aged 75) San Francisco Bay Area, California, U.S.
- Genres: Rock; pop rock; power pop
- Occupations: Musician; radio personality; novelist
- Instruments: Vocals; guitar
- Years active: 1976–2019
- Labels: Beserkley; CleanCuts
- Formerly of: The Greg Kihn Band
- Website: gregkihn.com

Gregory Stanley Kihn (/ˈkɪn/; July 10, 1949 – August 13, 2024) was an American rock musician, radio personality, and novelist. He founded and led the Greg Kihn Band, and wrote several horror novels. He is best known for the hits "The Breakup Song (They Don't Write 'Em)" in 1981 and "Jeopardy" in 1983.

== Career ==
=== Early influences ===
Kihn's early influence was the Beatles and their appearance on The Ed Sullivan Show. "Just about every rock and roll musician my age can point to one cultural event that inspired him to take up music in the first place: The Beatles on Ed Sullivan. If you were a shy 14-year-old kid who already had a guitar, it was a life-altering event... In a single weekend everything had changed. I'd come home from school the previous Friday looking like Dion. I went back to class on Monday morning with my hair dry and brushed forward. That's how quickly it happened."

Kihn began his career in his hometown of Baltimore, working in the singer/songwriter mold. But he switched to straightforward rock and roll when he moved to San Francisco in 1974. He started writing songs and playing coffee houses while still in high school in the Baltimore area. When Kihn was 17, his mother submitted a tape of one of his original songs to the talent contest of the big local Top 40 radio station, WCAO 600 AM. Kihn took first prize and won three things that would change his life: a typewriter, a stack of records, and a Vox electric guitar.

=== Recording career ===
After his move to California, Kihn worked at painting houses, singing in the streets, and the behind the counter job at Berkeley record store Rather Ripped Records. His co-worker was future bandmate and Earth Quake guitarist Gary Phillips. The next year, Kihn became one of the first artists signed to Matthew King Kaufman's Beserkley Records. Along with Jonathan Richman, Earth Quake, and the Rubinoos, Kihn helped to carve the label's sound—melodic pop with a strong 1960s pop sensibility—an alternative to the progressive rock of the time.

In 1976, after his debut on the compilation album Beserkley Chartbusters, he recorded his first album with his own ensemble called the Greg Kihn Band. Through the 1970s, Kihn released an album each year and built a strong cult following through constant touring. The group consisted of Robbie Dunbar (guitar), Steve Wright (bass), and Larry Lynch (drums). Dunbar, already a member of Earth Quake, was replaced by Dave Carpender in time to record their second album, Greg Kihn Again. In 1979, Kihn released his cover of Bruce Springsteen's "Rendezvous", a song which didn't make the cut for Springsteen's "Darkness on the Edge of Town" LP. Springsteen had admired Kihn's distinctive recording of "For You" so much that he sought out Kihn after a concert and gave him a cassette with the "Rendezvous" outtake, the lyrics, and permission to record the song, which Kihn did on his LP With the Naked Eye.

Meanwhile, Kihn's old record store pal, Gary Phillips, who had contributed guitar work to Kihn's first album, returned as a session musician on the band's Glass House Rock (1980) album. He officially joined the band as keyboardist for the follow-up album, RocKihnRoll (1981). The lineup of Kihn, Wright, Lynch, Phillips, and Carpender lasted until 1983, when Greg Douglass replaced Dave Carpender.

On May 10, 1981, Kihn and Willie Nile appeared live on the King Biscuit Flower Hour from the Savoy Theater in New York City.

The Greg Kihn Band became Beserkley's biggest seller, and, in 1981, the only artist on the label, after the Rubinoos and Jonathan Richman left and Earth Quake broke up. In 1981, he earned his first big hit on the Billboard Hot 100, "The Breakup Song (They Don't Write 'Em)," from the RocKihnRoll album. The song reached No. 15 on the charts and was frequently heard on album rock FM stations.

Kihn continued in a more commercial vein through the 1980s with a series of pun-titled albums: Kihntinued (1982), Kihnspiracy (1983), Kihntagious (1984), and Citizen Kihn (1985).

Kihn scored his biggest hit with "Jeopardy," which reached No. 2 on the Billboard Hot 100, from the Kihnspiracy album. The 1983 groundbreaking "Jeopardy" video became an MTV favorite. In the video, Kihn plays a would-be groom with fears about getting married. "Jeopardy" received heavy airplay on the fledgling cable music channel and spawned countless imitators.

Many of the videos that followed were sequels with connecting story lines. "Jeopardy" was spoofed by "Weird Al" Yankovic as "I Lost on Jeopardy", a single from his 1984 album In 3D. Kihn said he was flattered to be parodied and appeared at the end of the video driving a convertible with the license plate "LOSER". (In a radio interview, Kihn commented that he received "a nice check" from Yankovic's record company every month.)

For most of the 1980s Kihn toured frequently, opening arena-sized shows for groups including Journey, the Grateful Dead, and the Rolling Stones. Kihn often appeared on TV during this period on shows such as Solid Gold, American Bandstand, and Saturday Night Live.

In 1985, Kihn broke with Beserkley Records and signed with EMI. Matthew Kaufman continued to produce Kihn's albums. "Lucky" (1985) reached a modest No. 30 on the Hot 100 and spawned a splashy video sequel to the popular "Jeopardy" video. In 1986, Joe Satriani replaced Greg Douglass on lead guitar, Tyler Eng replaced Larry Lynch on drums, and Gary Phillips left with Pat Mosca taking over on keyboards. That is the lineup which recorded the album Love and Rock & Roll (1986).

=== Radio DJ and author ===
From 1996 through 2012, Kihn was a morning radio disc jockey (DJ). He did wake-ups for KUFX, a Bay Area classic rock radio station.

He also began a literary career in 1996 with the release of his first novel, Horror Show, published by Tor/Forge Books. Horror Show was nominated for the prestigious Bram Stoker Award for Best First Novel. It was followed by Shade of Pale (1997), Big Rock Beat (1998), and Mojo Hand (1999). He published many short stories during this period, some appearing in the Hot Blood series of erotic horror fiction. Kihn was contributing editor to Carved in Rock, a compilation of short fiction by musicians including Pete Townshend, Joan Jett, Ray Davies, and Kinky Friedman.

The Greg Kihn Band continued to play with a line-up comprising Kihn's son Ry Kihn on lead guitar, Dave Danza (from Eddie Money) on drums, Dave Medd (from the Tubes) on keyboards, and Robert Berry (from Hush) on bass. Kihn was inducted into San Jose Rocks Hall of Fame in 2007.

In September 2013, Music Life Radio interviewed Kihn about his music, radio, and writing careers.

Kihn's last album, ReKihndled, was released in 2017. He continued to perform live as late as December 2019.

=== Charity work and volunteerism ===
Kihn did charity work for "Operation Care and Comfort", a military support group responsible for sending care packages to hundreds of military units deployed in harm's way around the world. He was nominated for the 2010 “Man of the Year Award” by the Lymphoma Society and performed for Children's Hospital in Oakland, California, in the fight against cancer.

== Personal life and death ==
Kihn was born in Baltimore, Maryland, to parents Stanley J. Kihn, a city Health Department inspector who fought in the Battle of the Bulge during World War II, and Jane (Gregorek) Kihn.

Kihn had two children, son Ry - a guitarist and Lexi - a nurse. Kihn was of Polish descent.

Kihn died from complications of Alzheimer's disease in the San Francisco Bay Area, on August 13, 2024, at the age of 75.

== Author ==
Kihn wrote four horror fiction novels, beginning with Horror Show (1996), which was nominated for the Bram Stoker Award for Best First Novel, followed by Shade of Pale (1997). Big Rock Beat and Mojo Hand were released as sequels to Horror Show.

He released Carved in Rock: Short Stories by Musicians, a collection of short stories written by him and other well-known rock musicians including Pete Townshend, Graham Parker, Joan Jett, and Ray Davies. In 2013, Kihn released Rubber Soul, a murder mystery novel featuring the Beatles.

== Bibliography ==
- Kihn, Greg (1996). Horror Show. Tom Doherty Assoc Llc. ISBN 978-0-8125-5108-2.
- Kihn, Greg (1998). Shade of Pale. Tor Books. ISBN 978-0-8125-5109-9.
- Kihn, Greg (1998). Big Rock Beat. Forge Books. ISBN 978-0-312-86756-0.
- Kihn, Greg (1999). Mojo Hand. Forge Books. ISBN 978-0-312-87246-5.
- Kihn, Greg (2003). Carved in Rock: Short Stories by Musicians. Thunder's Mouth Press. ISBN 978-1-56025-453-9.
- Kihn, Greg (2013). Rubber Soul. Premier Digital Publishing. ISBN 978-1-62467-094-7.
- Kihn, Greg (2015). Painted Black.

== See also ==
- List of Billboard number-one dance club songs
- List of artists who reached number one on the U.S. Dance Club Songs chart
