= Dave Carpender =

American musician

- Born: David Edward Carpender; January 23, 1950; Oakland, California, U.S.
- Died: September 26, 2007 (aged 57) United States
- Genres: Rock and roll
- Occupations: Guitarist, musician
- Instrument: Guitar
- Formerly of: The Greg Kihn Band

Dave Carpender (January 23, 1950 – September 26, 2007) was an American musician best known as the guitarist for The Greg Kihn Band from 1976 to 1983. They had a #2 US /#63 UK hit in 1983 with "Jeopardy" and a #15 US hit in 1981 with "The Breakup Song (They Don't Write 'Em)". He died of heart failure in 2007, at age 57.
