= Steve Wright (bassist) =

American bass guitarist

- Born: 1950
- Origin: El Cerrito, California
- Died: January 16, 2017 (aged 66–67) Sacramento, California
- Occupation: Bass guitarist
- Formerly of: The Greg Kihn Band, Hades Blues Works

Steve Wright (1950 – January 16, 2017) was an American bass guitarist best known for his work with The Greg Kihn Band.

A native of El Cerrito, California, Wright had played in a band called Traumatic Experience with El Cerrito natives John Cuniberti and Jimmy Thorsen.

After changing their name to Hades Blues Works (later, Hades), they expanded into a quartet with Craig Ferreira in 1970 (he left in 1971).

He later joined the Greg Kihn Band with fellow El Cerrito native Larry Lynch.

Wright died of a heart attack at UC Davis Hospital in Sacramento, California, in the early hours of January 16, 2017. His former bandmate Greg Kihn announced his death on his website the following day.
