= Matthew King Kaufman =

American record producer (born 1946)

- Born: Matthew Kaufman; May 19, 1946 (age 79); Baltimore, Maryland, United States
- Genres: Rock and roll
- Occupations: Record producer, record label owner
- Label: Beserkley Records

Matthew "King" Kaufman (born May 19, 1946) is an American record producer who was the owner of leading independent label Beserkley Records in Berkeley, California from the mid-1970s through the mid-1980s, successfully producing records by Jonathan Richman, Greg Kihn and others.

== Biography ==
Born and raised in Baltimore, Maryland, Kaufman graduated from law school but never took the bar. Instead, convinced they were to be the next Beatles, Kaufman went to California to co-manage the San Francisco rock band Earth Quake. He helped the band get a two-record deal with A&M Records in 1970, and picked up production tips from Lou Adler and Glyn Johns. Also while at A&M, Kaufman helped organize the series of demos recorded by The Modern Lovers. These recordings were unreleased at the time, but would later form the basis of their acclaimed debut album.

=== The Beserkley Years (1973-1984) ===
After becoming frustrated with A&M, Kaufman decided to set up his own label in 1973. Beserkley Records (headquartered at John Doukas' house at 1199 Spruce St. in Berkeley, California). The first releases from the label, ignored in the United States, were embraced in the U.K. with Roadrunner reaching #11 on the UK singles chart. The follow-up single Egyptian Reggae reached #5 in the UK singles chart in 1977. By 1975, the label had an artist roster consisting of Earth Quake, Jonathan Richman (with and without the Modern Lovers), The Rubinoos and Greg Kihn. Kaufman co-produced album releases by all these artists, as well as acquiring the rights to the 1972 A&M Modern Lovers recordings, which were issued as an album in 1976. Beserkley also released singles and compilation tracks by a handful of other artists.

Buoyed by these successes, Kaufman opened a short-lived UK office of Beserkley, headquartered in Kingston-upon-Thames. They signed The Tyla Gang who released two albums in the US and the UK for the label, as well as The Smirks, who released two singles on Beserkley in the UK.

In addition to his duties as label owner and producer, Kaufman occasionally co-wrote songs with various Beserkley acts under the pseudonym "Rose Bimler". Kaufman was also an occasional recording artist for Beserkley, releasing singles under the names "Son of Pete" and "Count Slowly and the Four Twenties".

By the end of 1980, the only artist on Beserkley was Greg Kihn, who between 1981 and 1983 released three US top 40 albums and two US top 40 singles: "The Breakup Song (They Don't Write 'Em)" (#15, 1981), and "Jeopardy" (#2, 1983). All were produced by Kaufman.

However, after a long run of success, Kihn's 1984 album Kihntagious was a comparative flop, and Kaufman essentially shut down Beserkley. He blamed the label's demise on "corporate rock": "When marketing costs surpassed production budgets, it stopped being fun," he later said in an interview for a 2004 Beserkley label compilation.

=== Later career (1985-present) ===
Kaufman followed Kihn to EMI, where he remained Kihn's producer for his two EMI albums. He licensed some of the Beserkley Records catalogue to Rhino Records in 1986. He also continued to act as an occasional talent scout/producer, discovering Ed Haynes and producing his 1989 debut Ed Haynes Sings Ed Haynes for Apache Records.

In 1991, Kaufman co-founded Eastern Light Productions, producing a series of award winning Russian historical documentaries in collaboration with the Soviet Filmmakers' Society, Kinocenter. In 1996, he launched the Son Of Beserkley label.

In 2008, Kaufman launched a new label, Fun Fun Fun Recordings. Their first release was a compilation called "MP3 Jackpot Winners" which features songs discovered via the MP3 Jackpot website. Other 2008 Fun Fun Fun releases include "Skankin' Foolz Unite!" by Berkeley ska band, the Uptones, and "Repulsa" by metal goth act Repulsa. In 2009, Fun Fun Fun released CDs by Sex 4 Moderns, Hobo, and Stiff Richards, all produced by Kaufman.

In 2009, Kaufman commissioned the construction of a Ska Shrine devoted to skanking. Musashi "Moose" Lethridge and Eric Din of the Uptones built the shrine which now resides virtually at the Ska4u website. The shrine traveled with The Uptones for four dates in June, 2010, for The Warped Tour and is available to the public for dancing.
