= Beserkley Records =

American record label

- Founded: 1973
- Founder: Matthew King Kaufman
- Defunct: 1984
- Genre: Rock and roll, power pop, proto punk, punk rock, new wave
- Country of origin: U.S.
- Location: Berkeley, California

Beserkley Records was an American independent record label based in Berkeley, California, from 1973 to 1984. Beserkley is usually regarded as a power pop and rock and roll label. During the 1970s, the label released albums by Earth Quake, Greg Kihn, Jonathan Richman, and The Modern Lovers, the Rubinoos, and the Tyla Gang. Several other artists appeared on singles, or on compilation albums. From 1980 to its dissolution in 1984, Beserkley was a one-artist label, the artist being Greg Kihn.

== History ==
The label was founded by Matthew King Kaufman, along with members of the Bay Area band Earth Quake. Kaufman was a law graduate who became co-manager of Earth Quake, and helped them sign with A&M Records in 1970. After experiencing frustration at what he saw as A&M's incompetence in handling the band, and winning some compensation for the unauthorized use of Earth Quake's music in the movie The Getaway, he set up Beserkley Records, in 1973. Kaufman produced virtually all of Beserkley's output throughout its existence, often in association with Glenn Kolotkin, less frequently with Kenny Laguna.

For the first two years of its existence, Beserkley only put out singles. The first release (in late 1973) was Earth Quake's version of the Easybeats' "Friday On My Mind".

Initially none of the Beserkley singles were especially successful, but in 1975 some were assembled, together with newly recorded tracks, into the album Beserkley Chartbusters Vol. 1. As well as tracks by Earth Quake, this included tracks by power-pop group the Rubinoos, Jonathan Richman and Greg Kihn. Richman's recordings were his first as a solo performer (after the disbanding of the original Modern Lovers) and included the first released version of "Roadrunner", by Jonathan Richman backed by Earth Quake.

Kaufman and Richman had previously worked together on the Modern Lovers' sessions for A&M in 1972. In 1976, Kaufman licensed those recordings, together with the ones the band had made around the same time with producer John Cale for Warner Bros., and released them on Beserkley as the acclaimed album The Modern Lovers. Though neither Richman nor the Modern Lovers made the American charts, they were quite successful in the UK, with the singles "Roadrunner (Once)" and "Egyptian Reggae" making the UK Singles Chart.

Other 1970s Beserkley acts had less commercial success, although the Rubinoos made the US charts, hitting No. 45 with a cover of "I Think We're Alone Now" in 1977. As well, Earth Quake made the lower rungs of the American LP charts with their second of four albums for Beserkley (1976's 8.5, which peaked at No. 151).

Beserkley's records were initially distributed by Playboy Records until about 1977 (and during part of 1976, Playboy itself was distributed by CBS Records, and Beserkley was included in that arrangement, taking it from a small independently distributed label to briefly being a part of the huge CBS distribution system), then by Janus/GRT until 1979 and subsequently by Elektra.

In 1978, the label commissioned a multi-artist project of 14 musicians from their roster, including Earth Quake and the Rubinoos. They were recorded playing oldies, both well-known and obscure, and traded lead vocals for each of the recordings, which were released as the LP Spitballs. Reviewing in Christgau's Record Guide: Rock Albums of the Seventies (1981), Robert Christgau said, "I assume the title is a takeoff on Nuggets, and I approve of the concept ... I find most of the remakes amusing and one or two amazing. But inevitably, the music is ragged ... and I miss the pure dumb inspiration of the originals."

Beserkley's major breakthrough came with Greg Kihn, who sang backup on Earth Quake and Richman records before forming his own band. Beginning with his third album (1978's Next of Kihn), Kihn regularly made the American album charts and received steady airplay on FM radio. By the end of 1980, Kihn was the only artist on the Beserkley roster, and in 1981 he had his first top 40 hit with "The Breakup Song (They Don't Write 'Em)". Kihn's early 1980s albums Rockihnroll (1981), Kihntinued (1982) and Kihnspiracy (1983) all reached the top 40 on the LP charts, and his 1983 single "Jeopardy" became Beserkley's biggest-ever hit, peaking at US No. 2.

The label's demise was relatively swift. After several years of success, Kihn's 1984 single "Reunited" flopped (peaking at No. 102) and the parent album Kihntagious stalled at No. 121 on the charts. Beserkley founder Kaufman then essentially dissolved the label and allowed Kihn to sign with major label EMI, where Kaufman would continue to act as Kihn's producer.

The Beserkley catalogue was licensed to Rhino Records in 1986, and later to Castle Communications, Sanctuary Records, and BMG Rights Management. The label name was briefly reactivated in 1988 for a lone new album by Mrs. Green, produced by Kaufman and released only in the UK and Germany. Kaufman operated the Son of Beserkley label for a time in the 1990s; his current label is called Fun Fun Fun Recordings.

== Roster ==
- The Greg Kihn Band
- Earth Quake
- The Engineers
- The Modern Lovers
- Mrs. Green
- Lover's Leap

Surface Music - I am A Janitor

- Jonathan Richman
- The Rubinoos
- The Smirks
- Son of Pete
- Spitballs
- The Tyla Gang

== See also ==
- List of record labels
