= Rapple Dapple =

Studio album by the Greenberry Woods
- Released: February 8, 1994
- Studio: Waterfront (Hoboken)
- Genres: Power pop; jangle pop
- Length: 46:20
- Label: Sire
- Producers: Andy Paley, Steve Lau

The Greenberry Woods chronology
Rapple Dapple (1994)	Big Money Item (1995)

Rapple Dapple is the debut album of the Maryland-based band the Greenberry Woods, released in 1994. The group opened for Debbie Harry, Squeeze, and the Proclaimers to promote the album.

== Background ==
Composed of twin brothers Matt and Brandt Huseman, Ira Katz, and Miles Rosen, the Greenberry Woods formed in the late 1980s. The band performed their own material around the College Park area because they didn't know their instruments well enough to play cover songs. While performing at a club in New York, the group caught the attention of Seymour Stein, who eventually signed them to Sire Records. The label billed the Greenberry Woods as "direct lineage" from the Beatles, the Byrds, and Big Star.

== Production ==
Produced by Andy Paley and Steve Lau, the album was recorded at Waterfront Studios in Hoboken, New Jersey. Audio mixing was done at The Hit Factory in New York City. The title originated from lead guitarist Matt Huseman misquoting Babu from the television series Jeannie.

== Critical reception ==
J.D. Considine of Musician cited tracks "Hold On", "#37 (Feels So Strange)", and "I Knew You Would" as "tunefully intoxicating as anything on Crowded House". AllMusic writer James Chrispell called the album a "fine debut disc of pure pop." John M. Borack, reviewing for Trouser Press, was critical of the lyrics but said "when the melodies are as delicious as they are on “I’ll Send a Message,” “That’s What She Said” and the slightly punkified “Nowhere to Go,” such lyrical transgressions are easily overlooked." In Shake Some Action - The Ultimate Guide to Power Pop, Beverly Paterson wrote Rapple Dapple could easily pass as a long lost Beach Boys or Raspberries collection.

Of the Atlanta Journal, Steve Dollar wrote "there's no substance to the songs" and negatively compared the band to the Lemonheads and Matthew Sweet.

In the December 1994 issue of Billboard, critics Dalet Brady and Trudi Miller Rosenblum ranked Rapple Dapple as the eighth and first best album of 1994 respectively.

== Track listing ==
All tracks are written by Brandt Huseman, Ira Katz, Matt Huseman.

No.	Title	Lead vocals	Length
1.	"Trampoline"	Matt Huseman	3:22
2.	"#37 (Feels So Strange)"	Brandt Huseman	3:09
3.	"Sentimental Role"	Ira Katz	2:56
4.	"I'll Send a Message"	B. Huseman	2:12
5.	"Oh Christine"	M. Huseman	2:50
6.	"I Knew You Would"	Katz	3:21
7.	"Waiting for Dawn"	M. Huseman	3:51
8.	"That's What She Said"	Katz	2:44
9.	"The Sympathy Song"	B. Huseman	2:36
10.	"Adieu"	M. Huseman	4:24
11.	"Busted"	B. Huseman	4:37
12.	"More and More"	Katz	3:03
13.	"Nowhere to Go"	B. Huseman	3:00
14.	"Hold On"	M. Huseman	4:20
Total length:			46:20

== Personnel ==
The Greenberry Woods

- Matt Huseman – vocals, lead guitar (Note: Huseman also plays the six-string bass on "More and More" and piano on "Hold On")
- Brandt Huseman – vocals, bass guitar (Note: Huseman also plays piano on "#37 (Feels So Strange)")
- Ira Katz – vocals, rhythm guitar (Note: Katz also plays piano on "More and More")
- Miles Rosen – drums, percussion (Note: Rosen also contributes backing vocals to "Hold On")

Additional personnel

- Andy Paley – Hammond and backing vocals on "Hold On"
- Steve Lau – backing vocals on "Hold On"

Production

- Andy Paley – producer
- Steve Lau – producer
- Doug Conroy – engineer
- Jeff "Chim-Chim" Mauriello – assistant engineer
- Jay Healy – engineer, mixing
- Mike and Lewis – assistant engineer
- Greg Calbi – mastering
- Seymour Stein – A&R
- Anne Donoghue – product manager
- JoDee Stringham – art direction and design
- Kristine Larsen – photography
