= List of Sire Records artists =

This is a list of current and former artists that have recorded for Sire Records.

== A ==
- Acid Test
- ADX
- Against Me!
- A House
- Marc Almond
- Aphex Twin (non-Europe)
- Alvarez Kings
- The Apples in Stereo
- Armageddon Dildos
- Armor for Sleep
- The Assembly
- Associates
- The Avalanches
- Kevin Ayers
- Aztec Camera

== B ==
- Ben Fields
- Baby Ford
- Barclay James Harvest
- Barenaked Ladies
- Mandy Barnett
- Bash & Pop
- Battle
- Nathan Beauregard
- Belly
- The Beatmasters
- Bigod 20
- Blancmange (US)
- Blondie
- Blu (rapper)
- B-Movie
- Body Count
- Betty Boo
- Book of Love
- Boney M (US)
- Boy George
- Bradford
- BRITTANYSAIDBYE
- Broadcast
- Julie Brown
- Bronx Style Bob
- Bruce Hornsby
- David Byrne

== C ==
- Meryn Cadell
- John Cale
- Mississippi Joe Callicott
- Candye Kane
- Chiefs of Relief
- Chilliwack (US)
- Cleopatra
- Climax Blues Band
- The Cult (US)
- The Cure (US/Canada)
- Cold Fronts (US)
- Cyndi Lauper
- Cavetown

== D ==
- Dadawa
- Dangerous Muse
- Data
- Craig David
- Michael Davidson
- Danielle Dax
- The Dead Boys
- Deadsy
- Delta Rae
- Depeche Mode (North America)
- The Deviants
- Digette
- Dinosaur Jr.
- Dissidenten (Germany)
- The Distillers
- DMZ
- Dolphin (band)
- Donald D
- Gail Ann Dorsey
- Doubleplusgood
- D:Ream
- D.R.U.G.S.
- Duncan Dhu

== E ==
- Echo & the Bunnymen (US/Canada)
- Eisley
- The English Beat (US/Canada)
- Erasure (North America)
- Evermore
- Everything
- Everything But the Girl (US/Canada)
- Ewert and The Two Dragons

== F ==
- Falco
- The Farm
- Figures on a Beach
- Flamin' Groovies
- Fleetwood Mac (US/Canada)
- Focus (US/Canada)
- Foxy Shazam
- The Futureheads

== G ==
- Gallon Drunk
- Sophia George
- The Go-Betweens
- Martin L. Gore (North America)
- Laura Jane Grace
- The Greenberry Woods
- Gruppo Sportivo
- Guster

== H ==
- Haddaway
- John Wesley Harding
- Jerry Harrison
- Corey Hart
- Harvey Danger
- Deborah Harry
- Annie Haslam (US/Canada)
- Ofra Haza (US)
- Richard Hell and the Voidoids
- Richard X. Heyman
- HIM
- The Hives (US)
- Kristin Hersh
- Hot Hot Heat
- Eric Hutchinson

== I ==
- Ice-T

== J ==
- Jack's Mannequin
- James
- Jolene
- The Judybats

== K ==
- Kid Creole and the Coconuts
- Dee Dee King
- Kyary Pamyu Pamyu

== L ==
- La Casa
- Laid Back
- k.d. lang
- Les Negresses Vertes
- Less Than Jake
- Furry Lewis
- Jerry Lee Lewis
- Lights
- The Lilys
- Larrikin Love
- Luna

== M ==
- M (US and Canada)
- Madness (US)
- Madonna
- The Maine
- Mandy Moore
- Johnny Marr (US)
- Billie Ray Martin
- Martini Ranch
- Mastodon
- Matchbox
- Ian McCulloch
- Meg & Dia
- Mêlée
- Men Without Hats
- The Mighty Lemon Drops
- Ministry
- Modern English (US)
- Mojave 3
- Morcheeba
- Morrissey (US)
- My Bloody Valentine
- My Chemical Romance
- Mystery Jets

== N ==
- Nancy Boy
- Les Négresses Vertes
- Never Shout Never
- Nightmare of You
- Nick Kamen
- The Normal
- New Deal String Band
- The Nitecaps

== O ==
- The Ocean Blue
- The Odds
- Omah Lay

== P ==
- Tommy Page
- The Paley Brothers
- Paul Parker
- Pet Shop Boys (US)
- The Piranhas
- Plastic Bertrand
- Positive Noise
- Poster Children
- The Pretenders (US)
- Primal Scream
- Program 2
- Proper Grounds
- PRETTYMUCH

== R ==
- Radio Birdman
- Ramones
- Recoil
- Red Box
- Lou Reed
- Renaissance (US/Canada/Germany)
- The Replacements
- Revolting Cocks
- The Rezillos
- Rheostatics
- Charlie Rich
- Jonathan Richman and the Modern Lovers
- Ride
- Jean Ritchie
- Riverside
- Rollerskate Skinny
- The Romantics
- Roof Doctor
- Royal Crescent Mob
- David Rudder
- Arthur Russell

== S ==
- The Saints
- David Santo
- Ximena Sarinana
- Scorpio Rising
- Jimmy Scott
- Robin Scott
- Tim Scott
- Seal (US)
- The Searchers
- Sebadoh
- Secret Affair
- S'Express
- Sham 69
- Johnny Shines
- The Shys
- Silicon Teens
- Silversun Pickups (outside North America)
- Sister Double Happiness
- .Six Said Red
- The Smiths (US)
- Soft Cell (US)
- Soul Asylum
- Soup Dragons
- Spacehog
- Specimen
- Regina Spektor
- Spinnerette
- The Spill Canvas
- The Squares
- The Strangeloves
- The Subways

== T ==
- Taking Back Sunday
- Talking Heads
- Serj Tankian
- Troy Tate
- Evan Taubenfeld
- Taxiride
- Tegan and Sara
- Telex
- Chris Thomas
- The Ready Set
- Throwing Muses
- Johnny Thunders
- Tin Tin
- Tom Tom Club
- Frank Tovey
- The Tragically Hip (outside Canada)
- Tripmaster Monkey
- Tuff Darts
- Two Minds Crack

== U ==
- Ultramarine
- Uncle Tupelo
- The Undertones
- Underworld

== V ==
- Martha Veléz
- The Velvet Underground
- The Von Bondies
- The Veronicas

== W ==
- The Waltons
- Waterlillies
- Paul Westerberg
- Bukka White
- Wilco
- The Wild Swans
- Brian Wilson
- Robert Wilkins

== Y ==
- Yaz (North America)

== Soundtracks ==
- A Rage in Harlem
- A Walk on the Moon
- Body of War
- Dick Tracy
- Drop-Dead Gorgeous
- Earth Girls are Easy
- Election
- Even Cowgirls Get the Blues
- The Family Man
- Fear No Evil
- (500) Days of Summer
- Naked in New York
- Rock 'n' Roll High School
- Shag: The Movie
- The SpongeBob SquarePants Movie
- Trespass
- True Stories
- Who's That Girl?
- Wigstock
- Wild Orchid
