= The Paley Brothers =

American power pop duo

- Jonathan and Andy Paley in 1978.

Background information
- Origin: Boston, Massachusetts, U.S.
- Genres: Power pop
- Years active: 1976–1979
- Label: Sire
- Past members: Andy Paley; Jonathan Paley

The Paley Brothers were an American power pop duo formed in 1976 by brothers Andy and Jonathan Paley. After releasing one studio album and EP, they disbanded in 1979, although the brothers continued to collaborate on other projects. They are characterized by their more straightforward AM radio pop style which contrasted the ironic or aggressive attitudes projected by other power pop groups of the era.

Despite a lack of commercial success, the Paley Brothers achieved an underground cult following through their performances at CBGB while also touring extensively, opening for acts ranging from Shaun Cassidy to the Patti Smith Group. Music critic Stephen Thomas Erlewine described them as "perhaps the greatest example of a band that, by nearly every measure, should've been stars."

== Formation ==
Andy Paley formed the Paley Brothers with his younger brother Jonathan, a guitar/bass player and singer who also was part of the early Boston punk scene and had played with Boston and NYC bands such as Mong. They first started appearing as the Paley Brothers while Jonathan was still in Mong in 1976.

The Paley Brothers signed to Sire Records. For Sire, they released a four-song EP, produced by Jimmy Iovine and recorded in 1976, and a self-titled ten-song album, produced by Earle Mankey and recorded in 1977 (except for one track from the EP, "Come Out and Play"). The album was then reissued in a 12-song version, deleting one song from the original album and adding two more from the EP plus a single recorded by the Paley Brothers and the Ramones, another Sire Records group—a cover of the Ritchie Valens song "Come On Let's Go", which was also included on the Ramones' Rock 'n' Roll High School soundtrack. The single was recorded while Ramones lead singer Joey Ramone was ill (and so he does not appear), and before drummer Tommy Ramone left the Ramones.

The Paley Brothers album is referred to as power pop, with the punk and straight rock roots of the brothers mixed in. Although the album did not chart, in 1978 Sire had Phil Spector produce a new track, "Baby, Let's Stick Together", for their second album. According to the Sire Records head Seymour Stein, the recording was one of the last sessions done at Gold Star Recording Studios by the Wrecking Crew before the studio burned down. The brothers also appeared in the movies Sgt. Pepper's Lonely Hearts Club Band in 1978 and Rock 'n' Roll High School in 1979.

== Breakup ==
Recording with Phil Spector caused problems among the brothers; as Jonathan Paley later said, "Working with Phil Spector was fantastic but also very exhausting and ultimately contributed to me wanting to try something other than being a Paley Brother." They disintegrated as an act in 1979 when Jonathan joined the Nervous Eaters. As a result, neither the second album nor the Phil Spector-produced single were released; instead, their last released product was a 1980 novelty single entitled "Jacques Cousteau" that was credited to The Young Jacques. Although the Nervous Eaters collapsed after Ric Ocasek, who had produced their demo, was not permitted to produce their second album, The Paley Brothers did not reform. Said Jonathan, "It was more of an evolution. Andy went on the road with Patti Smith's band and got into production work; I went and sailed around the world."

== Post-breakup ==
Although the Paley Brothers never reformed, Jonathan and Andy Paley continued to do occasional projects together, such as co-composing the Jerry Lee Lewis hit "It Was the Whiskey Talkin' (Not Me)" and two other songs for the 1990 soundtrack to the movie Dick Tracy.

In late 2013, The Paley Brothers released a compilation album entitled The Paley Brothers: The Complete Recordings. The album includes 11 tracks of previously unreleased songs recorded in 1978 and 1979 that would probably have appeared on the second album (including "Baby, Let's Stick Together"), along with the fifteen previously released tracks from the 1977 Paley Brothers EP (four songs), the 1978 Paley Brothers album (ten songs), and the Young Jacques single.

Andy Paley died on November 20, 2024, at the age of 73.

== Discography ==
Studio album

| Year | Title |
|---|---|
| 1978 | The Paley Brothers: Released: 1978; Label: Sire |

Compilation

| Year | Title |
|---|---|
| 2013 | The Complete Recordings: Released: 2013; Label: Sire |
