= Big Money Item =

Studio album by the Greenberry Woods
- Released: 1995
- Genre: Power pop
- Label: Sire
- Producer: Andy Paley

The Greenberry Woods chronology
Rapple Dapple (1994)	Big Money Item (1995)	House (2018)

Big Money Item is an album by the American power pop band the Greenberry Woods, released in 1995. The band broke up two weeks after its release. "Smash-Up" and "Super Geek" were released as singles.

== Production ==
The album was produced by Andy Paley. The songwriting was equally divided among guitar players Matt and Brandt Huseman and bass player Ira Katz.

== Critical reception ==
Professional ratings
Review scores
Source	Rating
AllMusic	4.5/5 stars
Calgary Herald	B+
MusicHound Rock: The Essential Album Guide	4/5 stars
The Province	3.5/5 stars

Trouser Press called Big Money Item "superb stuff, but overly derivative." The Baltimore Sun thought that it "boasts enough beautiful minor-key melodies and lush, soaring harmonies to put any listener in mind of Rubber Soul and Revolver." The Record opined that "the quartet makes affecting, careful pop look so effortless that it's easy to underestimate their tremendous accomplishment."

The St. Petersburg Times wrote: "Like Squeeze and Crowded House at their least self-indulgent, the Beach Boys sans their one-trick-pony musical clichés, the Posies fulfilling their early promise, Badfinger with jangly optimism, Pezband with decent songs—this disc sounds as timeless and classic as anything you'll hear recorded today." The Calgary Herald stated that "the Woods jangle and harmonize through 18 condensed gems in 50 minutes." The Contra Costa Times declared that "the Greenberry Woods have tapped into some kind of long-forgotten genius on Big Money Item... this is an album so clear-headed and upbeat that you're blown backwards with joy." The Northwest Herald listed Big Money Item as the fifth best album of 1995; the Times Colonist listed it as the eighteenth.

AllMusic wrote that "even at its most superficial and derivative and unapologetically nerdy, Big Money Item is just so chock full of fatal hooks that ... well ... life almost starts to feel that fresh and innocent again."

== Track listing ==
No.	Title	Length
1.	"Love Songs"
2.	"Parachute"
3.	"Super Geek"
4.	"Smash-Up"
5.	"Yeah (Yeah, Yeah, Yeah)"
6.	"Round and Round"
7.	"For You"
8.	"Nervous"
9.	"Go Without You"
10.	"Invisible Threads"
11.	"Oh Janine"
12.	"Back Seat Driver"
13.	"Winslow to Arizona"
14.	"Baby You Can't Get It Back"
15.	"Punch Drunk"
16.	"Nice Girl"
17.	"Different Ways"
18.	"The Final Song"
