= It's a SpongeBob Christmas! =

- SpongeBob SquarePants episode
- Promotional still for the episode depicting SpongeBob's friends singing a Christmas carol.
- Episode no.: Season 8 Episode 23
- Directed by: Mark Caballero (animation); Seamus Walsh (animation); Luke Brookshier (storyboard); Marc Ceccarelli (storyboard); Alan Smart (supervising); Chris Finnegan (animation)
- Written by: Luke Brookshier; Marc Ceccarelli; Derek Iversen; Mr. Lawrence
- Production code: 268-841/268-842
- Original air dates: November 6, 2012 (DVD); November 23, 2012 (CBS); December 6, 2012 (Nickelodeon)

Guest appearance
- John Goodman as Santa Claus

Episode chronology
← Previous "For Here or to Go"	Next → "Super Evil Aquatic Villain Team Up is Go!"
- SpongeBob SquarePants (season 8)

"It's a SpongeBob Christmas!" is the 23rd episode of the eighth season, and the 175th episode overall of the American animated television series SpongeBob SquarePants. It originally aired on CBS in the United States on November 23, 2012, and on Nickelodeon on December 6. In the special, Plankton tries to convince SpongeBob to transform everybody in Bikini Bottom into jerks by feeding them his special jerktonium-laced fruitcakes in order to get his Christmas wish—the Krabby Patty secret formula.

Produced in stop motion animation, the episode was directed by Mark Caballero and Seamus Walsh at Screen Novelties. The episode's animation style was inspired by those of the classic Rankin/Bass television specials. Written by Luke Brookshier, Marc Ceccarelli, Derek Iversen, and Mr. Lawrence, "It's a SpongeBob Christmas!" was based on Tom Kenny and Andy Paley's 2009 song "Don't Be a Jerk (It's Christmas)", which was also featured in the episode. John Goodman guest starred as the voice of Santa Claus. On November 6, 2012, the soundtrack album and the DVD for the episode were released simultaneously.

Upon premiere, "It's a SpongeBob Christmas!" attracted nearly five million viewers and met positive critical reception. It received four nominations at the 40th Annie Awards including Best Animated Television Production for Children (with Dan Driscoll winning the Character Animation in an Animated Television or other Broadcast Venue Production category). It was also nominated for Best Sound Editing in Television at the 60th Golden Reel Awards.

== Plot summary ==
In the opening wraparound of the special, Patchy the Pirate and Potty the Parrot are driving in a mail truck which the former had stolen. While arguing about the directions to the North Pole, Potty sees a fork in the road and crashes. During Christmas season in Bikini Bottom, Plankton becomes angry that his evil acts have landed him on Santa Claus's naughty list, and he won't receive his Christmas wish—the Krabby Patty secret formula. However, he discovers jerktonium, an element that can turn anyone nice into a jerk, and plots a scheme. He bakes the jerktonium into fruitcakes he intends to spread around the town. To test it, Plankton lets SpongeBob taste a fruitcake, but the jerktonium has no effect on him. Upset that his plan seemingly failed, Plankton gives his fruitcake dispenser to SpongeBob, who promptly distributes the fruitcakes to all of Bikini Bottom and turns all the residents into jerks. Plankton then sends out an evil wind-up robot SpongeBob, called 'ToyBob', to commit troublesome deeds and frame the real SpongeBob.

The next day, SpongeBob begins to notice that everyone is acting like jerks. SpongeBob and Sandy Cheeks discover the antidote for jerktonium, and it happens to be a song. SpongeBob sings the song and brings back the residents' Christmas spirit. When Santa Claus arrives, however, he states that everyone in town is on his naughty list except for Plankton, whom he gives the secret formula. The SpongeBob robot arrives to eliminate Santa, but SpongeBob destroys the ToyBob robot with the fruitcake dispenser. Santa thanks SpongeBob and gives Plankton coal upon learning that he was behind the chaos.

As Patchy is about to give up searching for Santa, he suddenly finds what he believes to be Santa's workshop. He then sees Santa with gifts in a cave and tells him his Christmas wish is to meet SpongeBob. Patchy realizes that he was hallucinating and in reality encountered a hungry polar bear which starts chasing him. After Santa puts Patchy on the naughty list for stealing the mail truck, he and Potty wish the audience a Merry Christmas.

== Voice cast ==
=== Main voices ===
"Actor/Actress"	Role
Tom Kenny	SpongeBob; Patchy the Pirate; ToyBob; Postman; SpongeBob's Tastebuds
Bill Fagerbakke	Patrick Star; Frankie
Rodger Bumpass	Squidward Tentacles; Johnny
Clancy Brown	Mr. Krabs; Fake Santa
Carolyn Lawrence	Sandy Cheeks
Mr. Lawrence	Plankton
Jill Talley	Karen
Lori Alan	Pearl Krabs
Paul Tibbitt	Potty the Parrot
John Goodman	Santa Claus

=== Additional voices ===
- Tom Kenny
- Bill Fagerbakke
- Rodger Bumpass
- Carolyn Lawrence
- Mr. Lawrence
- Jill Talley

== Production ==
=== Development, writing, and voice casting ===
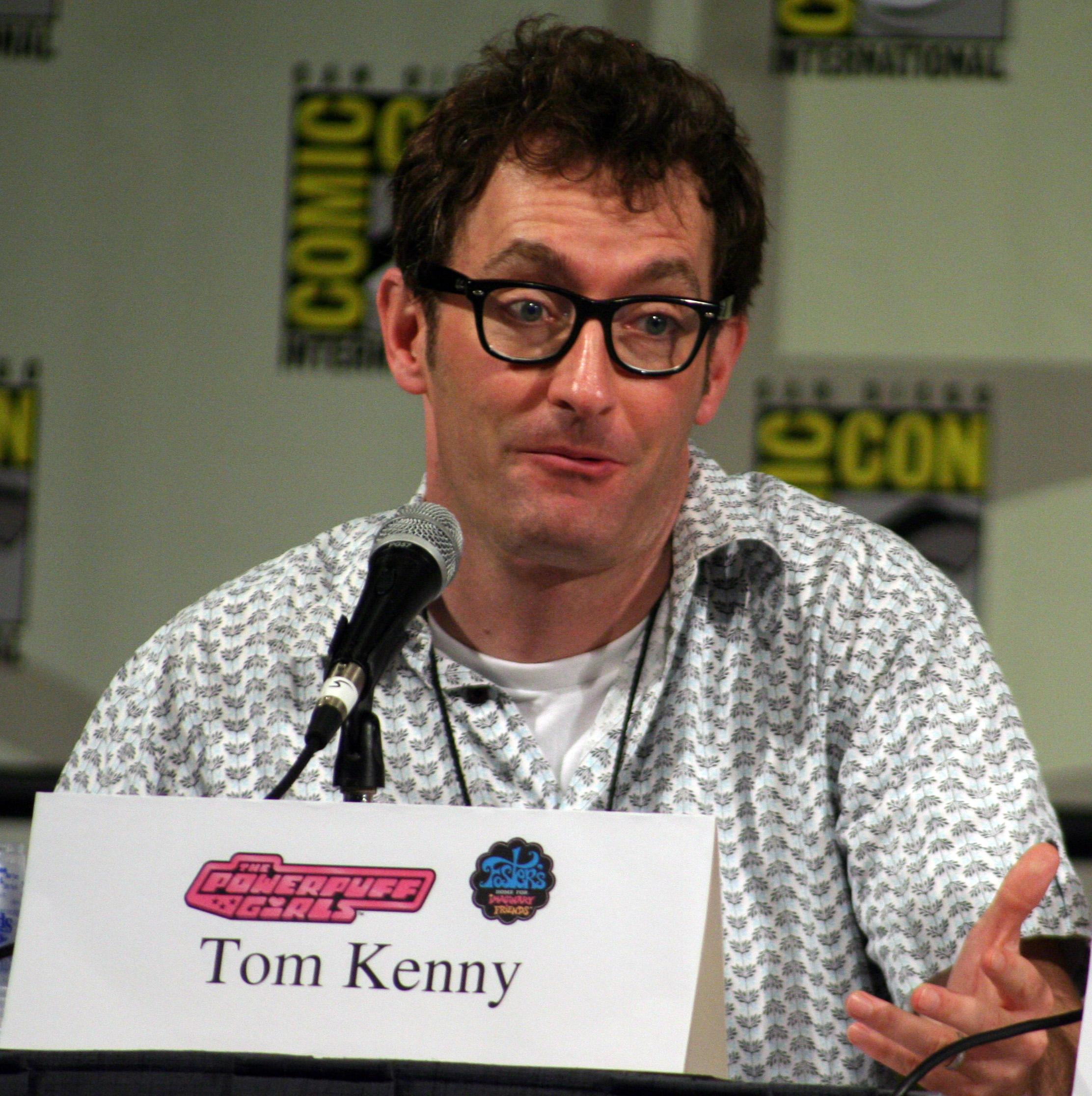
Tom Kenny (pictured here in 2008) and Andy Paley's Christmas song "Don't Be a Jerk (It's Christmas)", that was released in 2009, inspired Nickelodeon to produce the Christmas special. The song was used as the featured music in the episode and was re-released on the soundtrack album.

Luke Brookshier, Marc Ceccarelli, Derek Iversen, and Mr. Lawrence served as the episode's writers, with Brookshier and Ceccarelli serving as storyboard directors. "It's a SpongeBob Christmas!" was based on the 2009 Christmas song "Don't Be a Jerk (It's Christmas)" written by SpongeBob's voice actor Tom Kenny and his writing partner Andy Paley. They wrote it as "...just sort of a little sample calling card of what we were thinking about." The story of the song was conceived with the help of one of the episode's writers Mr. Lawrence. Kenny explained, "...Eventually somebody at Nickelodeon found it [the song] on their desk and decided to make it into a holiday special." The network let Kenny and Paley write three more songs for the upcoming special episode (Nickelodeon eventually decided to release a soundtrack album, which became It's a SpongeBob Christmas! Album, containing the songs to coincide with the episode).

"It's a SpongeBob Christmas!" was the first full-length episode of the series to be produced in stop motion animation. Mark Caballero, Seamus Walsh, and Christopher Finnegan animated it at Screen Novelties, where Caballero and Walsh served as the directors. Screen Novelties was chosen by the show's executives to execute the animation because they had already worked with them before in other several smaller projects. These include the revamping of the opening title sequence of the show for 2009's SpongeBob's Truth or Square and the stop motion sequence of The SpongeBob SquarePants Movie. Walsh explained that the staff found out about the studio through some of the company's animated shorts in their portfolio, and that they "wanted to have [Screen Novelties] apply [their] sensibilities to SpongeBob ... We come from the same planet as far as our sense of humor and comic sensibilities are concerned. But we also wanted to make sure that it felt like a SpongeBob episode."

All the main SpongeBob SquarePants cast members lent their voices to the episode. Series executive producer Paul Tibbitt also had a minor speaking role as the voice of Potty the Parrot. In addition to the regular cast, American actor John Goodman guest starred in the episode as the voice of Santa Claus.

=== Animation and filming ===
The animators cited the classic television specials Rudolph the Red-Nosed Reindeer and Santa Claus Is Comin' to Town by Rankin/Bass Productions as inspirations for the episode's animation styles, with Caballero saying that Arthur Rankin Jr. and Jules Bass were "big heroes" of theirs. Caballero noted that compared to the aforementioned specials, the episode was shot and produced through digital means.

Production on the episode officially began in October 2011 at Los Angeles, California, after several months of research and development. The animators worked closely with executive producer Paul Tibbitt, creator Stephen Hillenburg, and creative director Vincent Waller to ensure the cartoon characters were properly translated into three-dimensional puppets. Hillenburg and Tibbitt provided hands-on feedback on the production on a weekly basis: "They'd go back and forth with us on the various gags [...] It was really a pleasurable experience when they came to visit, because we come from the same planet. It all felt very easy and natural," Walsh said.

About 30 people—whom Walsh described "...seemed to be thrilled to work on the show"—worked on the making of the episode over at Screen Novelties. Walsh described the initial stage of production as "a very busy period for all of us ... We came in at about 8:30 in the morning and didn't leave until midnight some days. But it all zipped by pretty quickly." He said that they "felt pretty lucky because usually executives involved with productions look at the stop-motion process as annoying, but on this special, they were very jazzed and gung-go about it." To keep the production crew in the Christmas spirit, six months worth of Christmas music was played, which included 83 versions of The Nutcracker suite. According to Finnegan, it took about five months to shoot.

==== Set construction ====
Caballero and Walsh had conflicts on making sure the stop motion version of Bikini Bottom will resemble the 2D world of the series. Caballero said that Screen Novelties "didn't want to make exact sculptural copies of the cartoon drawings and layouts, just because it might've ended up feeling too 'perfect' or something." Instead, the staff chose to use various real-world objects to "puppetize" the world of Bikini Bottom, with art director Kelly Mazurowski helping out in picking the right materials to be used in the set.

Six sets were constructed on which 60 pounds of baking soda were used as snow (the crew tried to use real snow but it melted), 42 pounds of glitter were used to cover the background, and 20 boxes of breakfast cereal were used to cover the coral rocks. Over 38 different types of foam were used to make the set pieces and the characters' bodies and heads. To render SpongeBob's pineapple house, palm fronds from a tree in a school yard were used. Other props and materials used were an actual starfish, three Christmas trees (for the Patchy the Pirate's Winter Wonderland scenes), six boxes of puff cereal (to create the fruitcake inside SpongeBob's mouth), 21 pounds of googly eyes (for rivets, texture pieces, knobs, etc.), 22 pounds of woodchips (to create Sandy's treedome floor), and 24 bunches of craft flowers (to create the parade float).

==== Character design ====
"We had to make sure SpongeBob felt like SpongeBob[...] It actually took us a few months of going back and forth to make sure it didn't feel too plastic-y and ultrarealistic. We ended up using a type of cushion foam that was pretty malleable and gave off a bit of a translucent yellow glow off him. It had feel cuddly and happy-go-lucky as well as having that extra crazy element. It's not easy to translate a 2D character into a puppet: It can get ugly if you're not careful."

— Director Mark Caballero, on transforming the SpongeBob character into stop motion.

According to Caballero, SpongeBob was the most challenging character to translate to stop motion, noting that Screen Novelties "wanted to retain as much of that squashy-stretchy goofiness as possible, so he had dozens of replacement parts, like arms, noses, even various sizes of cheeks and freckles." Walsh said, "The most important thing is to capture the spirit of the character, not necessarily a literal copy of the 2D. Puppets have their own kind of energy and you have to be careful about what to include and what to leave out." On the other hand, Patchy the Pirate became the easiest character to make "because he has the most humanoid proportions."

== Release ==
=== Broadcast ===
A sneak-peek trailer for the episode was released in June 2012. On September 9, 2012, "It's a SpongeBob Christmas!" premiered in Israel. On November 23, 2012, "It's a SpongeBob Christmas!" aired on CBS in the United States and on YTV in Canada. It also premiered in the United Kingdom and Ireland on December 2, 2012. On December 6, 2012, "It's a SpongeBob Christmas!" aired on Nickelodeon in the United States, twelve years after the original airing of the first SpongeBob SquarePants Christmas special "Christmas Who?". According to Caballero, the decision to make the episode a CBS prime time special "came along later" and the crew "were stoked when [they] heard the news." He believed that the special was included because "most of the classic Christmas specials like Rudolph [the Red-Nosed Reindeer], Frosty [the Snowman], air on that channel."

=== Home media and other releases ===
"It's a SpongeBob Christmas!" was released on a DVD compilation of the same name on October 30, 2012, in Canada and on November 6, 2012, in the United States. The DVD features exclusive content including behind-the-scenes making of the special and interviews with the cast and crew, a pre-color animatic, and yule log. The initial announcement of the DVD release stated that it would contain three Christmas specials from T.U.F.F. Puppy, Fanboy & Chum Chum, and The Fairly OddParents as bonus features; however, these were dropped from the actual release. However, the Target exclusive of It's A SpongeBob Christmas! included the Christmas episodes of those shows on a bonus disc. A Blu-ray release was also announced, but was cancelled a week afterwards for unknown reasons; however, on July 22, 2013, Paramount Home Media Distribution announced that the Blu-ray would be released on October 15, 2013. "It's a SpongeBob Christmas!" was released for digital download on October 31, 2012, featuring over 30 minutes of exclusive behind the scenes footage, a sing along version of "Don't Be a Jerk (It's Christmas)," and more. On March 12, 2013, "It's a SpongeBob Christmas!" was released on the SpongeBob SquarePants: The Complete Eighth Season DVD, alongside all episodes of the eighth season. On June 4, 2019, "It's a SpongeBob Christmas!" was released on the SpongeBob SquarePants: The Next 100 Episodes DVD, alongside all the episodes of seasons six through nine.

== Reception ==
=== Ratings ===
In its original airing on CBS on November 23, the episode was viewed by an estimated 3.626 million households and received a 0.9 Nielsen rating and a 3.0 share among adults between the ages of 18 and 49. On December 8, Saturday, the airing of the episode on Nickelodeon drew 4.8 million viewers making the special win its time period across all television and posted strong, double-digit gains over last year with Kids 2–11 (7.8/2.6 million, +30%), Kids 6–11 (7.7/1.5 million, +45%), Teens 9–14 (5.7/1.2 million, +84%) and Adults 18–49 (1.2/1.3 million, +33%). Nickelodeon closed the week as the most-watched net in total day with kids 2–11 (2.8/936,000) and total viewers (1.8 million). In the United Kingdom, 273,000 viewers watched the episode. The broadcast in Canada received 835,000 viewers, the 23rd highest of the week on all Canadian television. In Spain, the premiere on December 20, 2012, received 618,000 viewers making it the 44th highest broadcast for that day.

=== Critical reception ===
"I don't know if 'SpongeBob SquarePants: It's a SpongeBob Christmas!' will become the TV classic watched year after year that the production teams hopes it will be... but it's good enough for right now. Plenty of funny gags and beautiful stop-motion animation add up to a Christmas winner here. I'm highly recommending 'SpongeBob SquarePants: It's a SpongeBob Christmas!.'"

— Paul Mavis, DVD Talk

The special episode received positive reviews from media critics. In his review for the Los Angeles Times, Robert Lloyd wrote, "I felt I'd been somewhere, watching this. When it ended, I was not ready to leave." David Hinckley of the New York Daily News wrote, "It's enough to make you want to dream of a yellow Christmas." Zack Handlen of The A.V. Club called the episode "cute, and goofy and doesn't have a mean bone in its body." Mark Frauenfelder of Boing Boing said that "...they [the animators] perfectly captured the look and feel of those delightful old stop motion specials." Judge Dawn Hunt of DVD Verdict called the episode "a sweet holiday treat, punctuated by musical numbers that'll leave you smiling." He added "If you're looking for a new holiday viewing, 'It's a SpongeBob Christmas!' is definitely worthy of consideration." Paul Mavis of DVD Talk applauded the episode and felt it would become a classic that would be watched every season. Director Walsh said that "Hopefully this will become a new tradition."

In her review for the About.com, Nancy Basile's review was mixed to positive and gave the episode a score of four out of five. She wrote, "...though I disagree with a few of the animator's choices, this Christmas special is a treat." Basile criticized its characters especially the use of foam to create the characters and the way Santa Claus was depicted saying "...he looks like a pig with liver spots." The animators responded to this comment about their interpretation of Santa Claus, saying "We definitely wanted to keep an element of strangeness, almost scary aspects in the story." Caballero explained that the idea of making Santa Claus look tired and strange came when they saw a drawing of him by Marc Ceccarelli or Luke Brookshier. Caballero said, "We thought that was a great idea. So we came up with our own little back story where Bikini Bottom is the last stop for Santa. He's tired, he wants to get home, take his shoes off ... We honed in on the old descriptions of Santa being a jolly old elf. We pictured him as humanoid, but not necessarily directly human."

=== Accolades ===
List of awards and nominations received by "It's a SpongeBob Christmas!"
Year	Award	Category	Nominee(s)	Result	Ref(s).
2013	Annecy International Animated Film Festival	Special Award for a TV Series		Nominated	
2013	Annie Awards	Best Animated Television Production for Children		Nominated	
2013	Annie Awards	Directing in an Animated Television or other Broadcast Venue Production	Mark Caballero; Seamus Walsh	Nominated	
2013	Annie Awards	Character Animation in an Animated Television or other Broadcast Venue Production	Dan Driscoll	Won	
2013	Annie Awards	Character Animation in an Animated Television or other Broadcast Venue Production	Savelen Forrest	Nominated	
2013	Golden Reel Awards	Best Sound Editing – Sound Effects, Foley, Dialogue and ADR Animation in Television	Mishelle Fordham, Vincent Guisetti, Jeffrey Hutchins, James Ian Lifton, Paulette Victor Lifton, D.J. Lynch, Wes Otis, Monique Reymond, Ed Steidele, Aran Tanchum	Nominated	

== Merchandise ==
Nickelodeon and Random House released a book based on the episode called It's a SpongeBob Christmas!. The book is illustrated by Heather Martinez and was released on September 10, 2013.
