= T.U.F.F. Puppy =

2010–2015 Nickelodeon animated series

- Genre: Animated comedy Superhero; Action; Science fantasy Slapstick; Surreal humor Adventure; Spy-fi
- Created by: Butch Hartman
- Voices of: Jerry Trainor; Grey DeLisle; Daran Norris; Jeff Bennett; Maddie Taylor
- Theme music composer: Adam Schlesinger; Butch Hartman
- Composer: Guy Moon
- Country of origin: United States
- Original language: English
- No. of seasons: 3
- No. of episodes: 60 (115 segments) (list of episodes)

Production
- Executive producer: Butch Hartman
- Producers: Deirdre Brenner; Dave Thomas (seasons 1–2); Ray DeLaurentis (seasons 2–3); Randy Saba (seasons 2–3)
- Running time: 11 minutes (regular); 23 minutes (specials)
- Production companies: Billionfold Inc.; Nickelodeon Animation Studio

Original release
- Network: Nickelodeon
- Release: October 2, 2010 – August 9, 2013
- Network: Nicktoons
- Release: October 20, 2013 – April 4, 2015

T.U.F.F. Puppy is an American action animated television series created by Butch Hartman. It premiered on October 2, 2010, along with Planet Sheen, which premiered a half hour earlier. T.U.F.F. Puppy is Hartman's third animated show for Nickelodeon, after The Fairly OddParents and Danny Phantom and before Bunsen Is a Beast. The show was canceled after three seasons and its final episode aired on April 4, 2015.

== Plot ==
The show is about a dog named Dudley Puppy, who works as a spy for T.U.F.F. HQ. His partner is Kitty Katswell, a cat. Other helpers are The Chief and Keswick. The setting is the fictional city of Petropolis (distinct from Petrópolis, Brazil), populated by anthropomorphic animals. As a member of T.U.F.F. HQ, Dudley helps Kitty protect Petropolis from villains including Verminious Snaptrap, The Chameleon, Bird Brain, Larry, Ollie, Francisco, Zippy, Owl, Bad Dog, and Skunk.

== Episodes ==
Season	Segments	Episodes		Originally released		
Season	Segments	Episodes		First released	Last released	Network
1	50	26		October 2, 2010	May 13, 2012	Nickelodeon
2	17	26 (Note: 50 segments total)	9	May 27, 2012	August 9, 2013	Nickelodeon
2	33	26	17	October 20, 2013	May 17, 2014	Nicktoons
3	15	8		July 26, 2014	April 4, 2015	Nicktoons

== Characters ==
=== T.U.F.F. ===
The Turbo Undercover Fighting Force (T.U.F.F.) headquarters (HQ) is an organization which protects Petropolis from crime.

- Dudley Puppy (voiced by Jerry Trainor) is a white mixed-breed dog who wears a black t-shirt.
- Kitty Katswell (voiced by Grey DeLisle) is a tan cat who is Dudley Puppy's partner.
- The Chief (voiced by Daran Norris) is a good-natured flea who leads T.U.F.F. HQ.
- Keswick (voiced by Jeff Bennett) is a prairie dog who's a scientist wearing glasses.

Other T.U.F.F. personnel (various background characters) include agents, office workers, and/or scientists. Some of the minor members of T.U.F.F. that have been identified or mentioned include:

- Agent Groundhog (voiced by Bennett) is a T.U.F.F. agent who first made a cameo in "Hot Dog". He resides under an office printer and is the one who tells about the end of winter.
- Agent Jumbo (voiced by DeLisle) is an elephant T.U.F.F. agent who has a fear of mice. This results in her jumping up when she sees them and accidentally crushing others.
- Agent Moby (voiced by Maddie Taylor) is a whale T.U.F.F. agent. Like Jumbo, Moby has a tendency to accidentally crush the Chief.
- Agent Nutz (voiced by Bennett) is a squirrel T.U.F.F. agent who has a tendency to blast anything that scares him with his laser gun.
- Tammy (voiced by DeLisle) is a rabbit who works as a secretary at T.U.F.F. HQ.

=== Villains ===
- D.O.O.M. (short for Diabolical Order of Mayhem) is an evil organization which is the main enemy of T.U.F.F.
  - Verminious Snaptrap (voiced by Maddie Taylor) is an evil rat who is the leader of the Diabolical Order of Mayhem.
  - Larry (voiced by Bennett) is a shrew and Snaptrap's brother-in-law who is often mistreated by him.
  - Ollie (voiced by Bennett) is a sensible and smart British possum who is one of Snaptrap's henchmen.
  - Francisco (voiced by Norris) is a green alligator with red and yellow eyes who is one of Snaptrap's henchmen.
  - Bad Dog (voiced by Bennett in the first appearance, Norris in later appearances) is a pit bull who is one of Snaptrap's henchmen. The character does not appear after the first season.
  - Leather Teddy (voiced by Eric Bauza) is a leather clad blue bear and one of Snaptrap's henchmen. He wears an eyepatch despite having a working eye. The character does not appear after the first season.
  - The Mole (voiced by Maddie Taylor) is a literal mole who is a spy for Snaptrap. The character does not appear after the first season.
- The Chameleon (voiced by Norris impersonating Peter Lorre) is an evil green chameleon who is one of the main antagonists of the series. He wear a molecular transformation suit which allows him to blend in with walls and disguise himself as anything or anyone.
- Bird Brain (voiced by Rob Paulsen) is an evil blue-bottomed booby bird criminal genius who cannot fly naturally.
  - Zippy (voiced by DeLisle) is Bird Brain's scatterbrained hummingbird sidekick/partner.
  - Owl (voiced by Bennett) is an owl.
  - Bat (voiced by Norris impersonating Bela Lugosi) who wears a bat in sunglasses.
  - Duck (voiced by Bennett) is a duck whose name causes the rest of Bird Brain's henchmen to actually duck.
  - Ewe (voiced by DeLisle) is a female sheep.
- R.I.T.A. (voiced by DeLisle) is a super-intelligent toaster created by Keswick.
- Snowflake and Slush (voiced by Mary Birdsong and Dave Boat) are evil rabbit siblings.
- Dr. Rabies and Madame Catastrophe (voiced by Jerry Trainor and DeLisle) are two villains who resemble Dudley Puppy and Kitty Katswell with eyepatches and goatees.
- Crazy Horse (voiced by Norris) is a horse who uses chainsaws.
- Jack Rabbit (voiced by Norris) is Kitty's T.U.F.F. partner.
- The Caped Cod (voiced by Chris Parnell in the first appearance, Mick Wingert in later appearances) is a crazy cod who thinks he is the ruler of the seven seas.
- The Stink Bug (voiced by Carlos Alazraqui) is Petropolis' worst smelling villain.
- Lunch Lady Bug (voiced by Candi Milo) is a ladybug who worked as a lunch lady at Petropolis High School and makes disgusting food that only Dudley likes.
- F.L.O.P.P. (short for Fiendish League of Potential Perpetrators) is a criminal organization that would often do minor criminal activities.
  - Meerkat (voiced by Daran Norris impersonating Paul Lynde) is a meerkat with a black cowboy hat who is the eccentric leader of F.L.O.P.P.
  - Wanna-Bee (voiced by Jerry Trainor) is a bee with a high voice who is a member of F.L.O.P.P.
  - Escape Goat (voiced by Maddie Taylor impersonating Paul Reubens) is an escape artist goat who is a member of F.L.O.P.P.
- Quacky the Duck (voiced by Maddie Taylor impersonating Bobcat Goldthwaite) was originally a kid show host seen in "Kid Stuff" until he later went rogue when he heard that his show was getting cancelled.
  - The Sharing Moose (voiced by Bennett) is a moose that is the buff and violent best friend of Quacky the Duck.
- Katty Katswell (voiced by DeLisle) is Kitty Katswell's evil twin sister.

=== Recurring characters ===
- Peg Puppy (voiced by Leslie Carrara-Rudolph) is Dudley's overprotective mother.
- Mrs. Katswell (voiced by DeLisle) is Kitty and Katty Katswell's mother.
- Wolf Spitzer (voiced by Norris) is a wolf who is Petropolis local news reporter for KPET News.
- Eric (voiced by Norris) is a buff cat who delivers the water to T.U.F.F.
- Bob Barky (voiced by Norris) is a dog game show host who hosts various game shows in Petropolis..
- Phil (voiced by Maddie Taylor) is a bulldog who is Dudley's friend.
- Mr. Wong (voiced by Maddie Taylor) is a duck who is the owner of a buffet restaurant.

== Production ==
Butch Hartman began conceiving a show for Nickelodeon in the fall of 2006, after production on the fifth season of The Fairly OddParents was completed. Around 2008–2009, Hartman began production of his third show for Nickelodeon, which became T.U.F.F. Puppy. He said that he had created the central character wanting to make a crime-fighting show based on Dudley Puppy. Because a previous animated series of his, Danny Phantom, has superheroes, Hartman decided that he would focus on making Dudley a secret agent. He pitched the series to Nickelodeon as "Get Smart with a dog." The show premiered in 2010 alongside the Jimmy Neutron spin-off, Planet Sheen. The show ended in 2015 on Nickelodeon's spinoff network, Nicktoons.

Eric Bauza (who voices Foop in The Fairly OddParents and Leather Teddy in T.U.F.F. Puppy), was originally chosen to be the voice of Dudley Puppy, but the creators did not feel that he was right for the character and Jerry Trainor was chosen instead. The original title of the show was Stud Puppy.

== Home media ==
T.U.F.F. Puppy home video releases
Season	Episodes	Years active	Release dates
Season	Episodes	Years active	United States
1	26	2010–12	iCarly: Season 2, Volume 3: April 5, 2011; Episodes: "Purr-fect Partners" / "Doom-mates" SpongeBob SquarePants: Heroes of Bikini Bottom: June 14, 2011; Episodes: "Mall Rat" / "Operation: Happy Birthday" SpongeBob SquarePants: Frozen Face-Off: January 10, 2012; Episodes: "Snappy Campers" / "Lucky Duck" It's a Nicktoons Christmas!: October 30, 2012; Episodes: "A Doomed Christmas"; Note: This disc was exclusively included with copies of the It's a SpongeBob Christmas! DVD sold at Target. The Complete First Season: June 23, 2014; Episodes: Entire season included
2	26	2012–14	The Complete Second Season: January 8, 2015; Episodes: Entire season included

Note: The episode "A Doomed Christmas" along with Christmas episodes of The Fairly OddParents and Fanboy & Chum Chum were supposed to be on the It's a SpongeBob Christmas! DVD, but they were dropped from the actual release. However, the Target exclusive of It's A SpongeBob Christmas! included the Christmas episodes of those shows on a bonus disc.

== Reception ==
=== Critical ===
Emily Ashby of Common Sense Media gave the series 2 out of 5 stars; criticizing the “iffy messages” the show sends to kids and the frequent use of name calling, but adding, “Kitty's attractive appearance and overly emotional response to Dudley's successes are memorable.”

=== Ratings ===
The series premiere of T.U.F.F. Puppy drew 3.6 million viewers.

=== Awards and nominations ===
Year	Award	Category	Nominee	Result	Ref.
2011	38th Annie Awards	Outstanding Achievement in Storyboarding in an Animated Television Production	Fred Gonzales	Won	
2011	38th Annie Awards	Outstanding Achievement in Character Design in a Television Production	Ernie Gilbert	Won	
2011	38th Annie Awards	Outstanding Achievement in Character Design in a Television Production	Gordon Hammond	Nominated	
2011	38th Daytime Emmy Awards	Outstanding Individual Achievement in Animation	Kaz Aizawa	Won	
2012	39th Annie Awards	Outstanding Achievement in Character Design in a Television Production	Gordon Hammond and Mike Dougherty	Nominated	
2012	39th Annie Awards	Outstanding Achievement in Directing in a Television Production	Ken Bruce	Nominated	
2012	39th Annie Awards	Outstanding Achievement in Storyboarding in a Television Production	Dave Thomas and Fred Gonzales	Nominated	
2012	39th Annie Awards	Outstanding Achievement in Writing in a Television Production	Ray DeLaurentis, William Schifrin, and Kevin Sullivan for episode "Thunder Dog"	Nominated	
2012	39th Daytime Creative Arts Emmy Awards	Outstanding Individual Achievement in Animation	Ernie Gilbert	Won	
2012	39th Daytime Creative Arts Emmy Awards	Outstanding Music Direction and Composition	Guy Moon	Nominated	
2013	40th Annie Awards	Outstanding Achievement in Character Design in an Animated Television/Broadcast Production	Gordon Hammond for episode "Dudley Do-Wrong"	Nominated	
2013	40th Annie Awards	Outstanding Achievement in Music in an Animated Television/Broadcast Production	Guy Moon for episode "Mission: Really Big Mission"	Nominated	
2013	40th Annie Awards	Outstanding Achievement in Voice Acting in an Animated Television/Broadcast Production	Jeff Bennett as "Keswick" for episode "Pup Daddy"	Nominated	
2013	40th Daytime Creative Arts Emmy Awards	Outstanding Performer in an Animated Program	Jerry Trainor as "Dudley Puppy"	Nominated	
