= Dick Tracy (soundtrack) =

Soundtrack album by various artists
- Released: June 12, 1990
- Genre: Jazz
- Length: 45:26
- Label: Sire/Warner Bros. Records
- Producer: Andy Paley

Professional ratings
Review scores
Source	Rating
Allmusic	link

Dick Tracy is the 1990 soundtrack album to the film of the same name. It features songs written by Andy Paley and performed by such diverse musicians and singers as k.d. lang, Take 6, Jerry Lee Lewis, Brenda Lee, Tommy Page, August Darnell, Patti Austin, Erasure, Ice-T, LaVern Baker, Al Jarreau, Darlene Love and Paley himself. Most of the songs on the album are performed in the style of the music of the 1930s, the era in which the film is set, with the exception of more modern performances such as a rock and roll version of Lewis' "It Was the Whiskey Talkin' (Not Me)" and a "90's Mix" of Ice-T's "Dick Tracy".

The album is one of three soundtracks released alongside the film, the others being Madonna's I'm Breathless album, and an orchestral score by Danny Elfman (which was expanded by Intrada Records in 2016). Only half of the album tracks—"Ridin' the Rails", "Pep, Vim and Verve", "It Was the Whiskey Talkin' (Not Me)", "You're in the Doghouse Now", "Some Lucky Day", "Blue Nights", "Looking Glass Sea", and "Rompin' & Stompin'"—appear on the film. Three Stephen Sondheim songs recorded by Madonna for the film are included on I'm Breathless, along with "Now I'm Following You" which was sung by Andy Paley in the film. A month after the release of the soundtrack album, Ice-T released a single titled "Dick Tracy" which featured a different song from the one featured on the album.

== Track listing ==
No.	Title	Performer	Length
1.	"Ridin' the Rails"	k.d. lang and Take 6	2:17
2.	"Pep, Vim and Verve"	Jeff Vincent and Andy Paley	3:21
3.	"It Was the Whiskey Talkin' (Not Me)"	Jerry Lee Lewis	3:39
4.	"You're in the Doghouse Now"	Brenda Lee	1:58
5.	"Some Lucky Day"	Andy Paley	2:33
6.	"Blue Nights"	Tommy Page	2:44
7.	"Wicked Woman, Foolish Man"	August Darnell	2:12
8.	"The Confidence Man"	Patti Austin	2:23
9.	"Looking Glass Sea"	Erasure	2:45
10.	"Dick Tracy"	Ice-T	2:37
11.	"Slow Rollin' Mama"	LaVern Baker	2:24
12.	"Rompin' & Stompin'"	Al Jarreau	2:05
13.	"Mr. Fix It (1930s Version)"	Darlene Love	2:50
14.	"Mr. Fix It"	Darlene Love	3:15
15.	"It Was the Whiskey Talkin' (Not Me) (Rock & Roll Version)"	Jerry Lee Lewis	2:55
16.	"Dick Tracy (90's Mix)"	Ice-T	5:28

== Charts ==
Chart (1990–1991)	Peak position
Australia (ARIA Charts)	75
Hungarian Albums (MAHASZ)	35
US Top Pop Albums (Billboard)	108
