= Andy Paley =

American songwriter (1952–2024)

- Paley c. 1978

Background information
- Born: Andrew Douglas Paley; November 1, 1951; Washington, D.C., U.S.
- Origin: Halfmoon, New York, U.S.
- Died: November 20, 2024 (aged 73) Colchester, Vermont, U.S.
- Genres: Power pop; film score
- Occupations: Songwriter; record producer; multi-instrumentalist
- Instruments: Keyboards; piano; organ; guitar; drums; harmonica; accordion; ukulele; banjo; autoharp; string bass; vibraphone; marimba; vocals
- Formerly of: Catfish Black; the Modern Lovers; the Paley Brothers; the Sidewinders
- Website: andypaley.com

Andrew Douglas Paley (November 1, 1951 – November 20, 2024) was an American multi-instrumentalist, songwriter, record producer, and composer. During the 1970s, he performed around the Boston area with numerous bands and formed the Paley Brothers, a power pop duo, with his brother Jonathan Paley. Following the Paley Brothers' disbandment in 1979, Andy was briefly a member of the Modern Lovers and a longtime staff producer at Sire Records.

Paley produced albums for artists such as Brian Wilson, Jonathan Richman, NRBQ, John Wesley Harding, the Greenberry Woods, and Jerry Lee Lewis. He worked extensively with Wilson, co-writing and co-producing his 1988 debut solo album and many unreleased songs. After the late 1980s, Paley worked in film and television, composing scores and writing songs mostly for animated series, such as The Ren & Stimpy Show, SpongeBob SquarePants, and Camp Lazlo. He died of throat cancer in 2024, leaving behind a wealth of unreleased solo material.

== Early life and career ==
Andrew Douglas Paley was born in Washington, D.C., on November 1, 1951, the son of Henry Paley, a college administrator and lobbyist, and Cabot Barber Paley, a teacher and therapist. He was the third of five children and grew up in Crescent, New York, near Albany.

"These snappy, hard-hitting songs are what rock and roll used to sound like back when singles were singles and boys would be boys."

— Review of The Sidewinders in Christgau's Record Guide: Rock Albums of the Seventies (1981)

Paley began performing in his early teens as a drummer and singer for local Albany-area bands before moving to Boston. He was a founding member and the drummer of the Boston, Massachusetts band, Catfish Black, which also included future Modern Lovers members Jerry Harrison and Ernie Brooks. The band was renamed the Sidewinders and was later joined by Billy Squier. The band performed around Boston and in New York City at venues like Max's Kansas City. They released an album, produced by Lenny Kaye, which featured songs written and sung by Paley. The Sidewinders broke up in the mid-1970s. Paley then played on Elliott Murphy's album Night Lights, and performed with Jonathan Richman after the break-up of the original Modern Lovers.

== The Paley Brothers ==
Paley went on to form The Paley Brothers with his younger brother Jonathan, a guitar/bass player and singer who also was part of the early Boston punk scene and had played with Boston and New York bands such as Mong. They disintegrated as an act in 1979 when Jonathan joined the Nervous Eaters. Although the Nervous Eaters collapsed after Ric Ocasek, who had produced their demo, was not permitted to produce their second album, the Paley Brothers did not reform. Said Jonathan, "It was more of an evolution. Andy went on the road with Patti Smith's band and got into production work; I went and sailed around the world."

== Collaborative work ==
In 1979, Andy Paley played guitar on Jonathan Richman's album Back in Your Life, and continued to perform on and off with Richman and later incarnations of the Modern Lovers, and produce many of their recordings, through the 1980s. He produced Richman's 1985 album Rockin' and Romance. Paley then focused on songwriting, session work and record production while working with Madonna, k.d. lang, Mandy Barnett, Jerry Lee Lewis, Elton John, Brenda Lee, Little Richard, and many others.

In 1988, Paley produced and co-wrote songs on Wilson's solo comeback album Brian Wilson, and continued to work with him on unreleased material in the 1990s. Wilson described Paley as a multi-instrumentalist with "a lot of talent for anything you can think of. ... Andy Paley is the most frighteningly talented person I’ve ever worked with, and he has an unparalleled seriousness about music."

== Film and television work ==
Paley produced the soundtracks for Dick Tracy (1990) and A Walk on the Moon (1999) and wrote the original music for Traveller (1997, starring Bill Paxton). In 2009, he contributed to the soundtrack of World's Greatest Dad, directed by Bobcat Goldthwait and starring Robin Williams. He also wrote the musical score for the first season of Showtime's The L Word.

Paley also scored for cartoons such as The Ren & Stimpy Show, and later wrote and produced the music for Nickelodeon's SpongeBob SquarePants. He and Tom Kenny – the voice of SpongeBob – co-wrote the It's a SpongeBob Christmas! Album (2012). Paley and Kenny were also both members of Tom Kenny and the Hi-Seas. He led the Andy Paley Orchestra, which provided the music for The Thrilling Adventure & Supernatural Suspense Hour, a theater group in Los Angeles that performs original stage productions in the style of old radio melodramas. Additionally he provided music for The Dana Gould Hour podcast.

== Personal life and death ==
His younger sister Sarah is married to former U.S. senator Bob Kerrey. In 2010, Andy married Heather Crist in a ceremony officiated by Kerrey. They had twin sons and lived in Grand Isle, Vermont.

In July 2024, Paley was diagnosed with throat cancer. Though he was successfully treated and had been cancer-free from September, it was found to have returned on November 7, after he was admitted to a hospital in Burlington, Vermont. Heather Crist Paley wrote on her blog that her husband's health steadily deteriorated over the following days, and he was eventually admitted to a hospice facility in Colchester, Vermont. He died there on November 20, at the age of 73. He was remembered by the New York Times as, "a record producer, composer and rock ’n’ roll chameleon".

== Discography ==
Albums produced

- Professor Anonymous – Living In The World (1980)
- The Real Kids – Outta Place (1982)
- The Real Kids – Hit You Hard (1983)
- Border Boys – Tribute (1983)
- Jonathan Richman and the Modern Lovers – Rockin' and Romance (1985)
- Jonathan Richman and the Modern Lovers – It's Time For (1986)
- Boys Wonder – Now What Earthman? (1987)
- Brian Wilson – Brian Wilson (1988)
- Various – Shag: Original Motion Picture Soundtrack (1988)
- Chris Isaak – Heart Shaped World (1989) (on track Diddley Daddy)
- John Wesley Harding – God Made Me Do It – The Christmas EP (1989)
- NRBQ – Wild Weekend (1989)
- John Wesley Harding – Here Comes the Groom (1990)
- Nasa – Insha-Allah! (1990)
- Various – Dick Tracy (1990)
- Richard X. Heyman – Hey Man! (1991)
- The Mighty Lemon Drops – Sound ... Goodbye to Your Standards (1991)
- John Wesley Harding – The Name Above the Title (1991)
- The Greenberry Woods – Rapple Dapple (1994)
- The Greenberry Woods – Big Money Item (1995)
- Jerry Lee Lewis – Young Blood (1995)
- The Foremen – Folk Heroes (1995)
- Jonathan Richman – Surrender to Jonathan! (1996)
- Paleface – Get Off (1996)
- Various – The Best Day Ever (2006)
