= The SpongeBob Movie: Sponge Out of Water (soundtrack) =

2015 soundtrack albums

Music from The SpongeBob Movie: Sponge Out of Water is the soundtrack extended play to the 2015 film The SpongeBob Movie: Sponge Out of Water. It was released on February 3, 2015, by Nickelodeon Records, Columbia Records and I Am Other, that consisted of five-songs with three of them performed by N.E.R.D. and two songs from the cast members. The band's frontman Pharrell Williams produced the soundtrack with Chad Hugo. The SpongeBob Movie: Sponge Out of Water (Music from the Motion Picture) which consists of the film score composed by John Debney released by Varèse Sarabande on March 3, 2015.

A fully animated musical sequence, "Thank Gosh It's Monday", was also cut from the film. This song was originally going to be part of The SpongeBob Movie: Sponge Out of Water, but it was cut for time.

"Erase Your Little Sadness" is the theme song for the Chinese version of the film sung by the Chinese-Korean pop group UNIQ.

== Music from The SpongeBob Movie: Sponge Out of Water ==
Music from The SpongeBob Movie: Sponge Out of Water

EP by N.E.R.D/Various artists
- Released: February 3, 2015
- Recorded: 2014
- Genre: Hip hop, pop, reggae fusion
- Length: 11:08
- Label: Nickelodeon; Columbia; i Am Other
- Producer: Pharrell Williams; Chad Hugo

SpongeBob SquarePants chronology
It's a SpongeBob Christmas! Album (2012)	Music from The SpongeBob Movie: Sponge Out of Water (2015)	SpongeBob SquarePants: The New Musical (Original Cast Recording) (2017)

Singles from Music from The SpongeBob Movie: Sponge Out of Water
- 1. "Squeeze Me" Released: January 5, 2015

It was announced that Pharrell Williams with his band N.E.R.D would write a song, which is titled "Squeeze Me", for the film. It was released as a single on January 5, 2015. The band further wrote two more songs for the soundtrack. A five-song EP was released digitally on February 3, 2015.

=== Track listing ===
No.	Title	Artist	Length
1.	"Squeeze Me"	N.E.R.D	2:34
2.	"Patrick Star"	N.E.R.D	1:46
3.	"Sandy Squirrel"	N.E.R.D	3:01
4.	"Team Work"	Tom Kenny & Mr. Lawrence	1:07
5.	"Thank Gosh It's Monday"	Tom Kenny, Bill Fagerbakke & Clancy Brown	2:40

== The SpongeBob Movie: Sponge Out of Water (Music from the Motion Picture) ==
The SpongeBob Movie: Sponge Out of Water (Music from the Motion Picture)

Film score by John Debney
- Released: March 2, 2015
- Recorded: 2014
- Genre: Film score
- Length: 48:49
- Label: Varèse Sarabande

John Debney chronology
Stonehearst Asylum (2014)	The SpongeBob Movie: Sponge Out of Water (Music from the Motion Picture) (2015)	Careful What You Wish For (2015)

The original score for the film was composed and conducted by John Debney and performed by the Hollywood Studio Symphony. Debney used Hawaiian steel guitars, bassoons and orchestral music, to produce familiar as well different sounds that would expand the 1980s synthesized music. On February 16, 2015, Debney announced via Twitter that Varèse Sarabande would release his score digitally. The score released in the UK on March 2, 2015, and on the following day in the US, along with a physical release on March 24, 2015.

=== Track listing ===
No.	Title	Length
1.	"Burger Beard on Island"	3:09
2.	"Burger Beard Starts to Read"	0:35
3.	"Plankton Attack / Tank Defeat / Giant Robot / Trying to Steal Formula"	4:07
4.	"Torturing Plankton / Refund"	3:18
5.	"Escaping in a Bubble"	2:33
6.	"The End / Get Him"	5:06
7.	"Going to Sleep / Inside SpongeBob's Brain"	2:09
8.	"Getting the Key / Plankton Rescues Karen"	1:53
9.	"Intro Bubbles"	2:08
10.	"Stealing Formula Back / Pirate Ship and Food Truck"	2:53
11.	"My Very Own Food Truck / Sandy Proposes Sacrifice"	1:49
12.	"Bubbles to the Rescue / Beach Search for Krabby Patties"	3:56
13.	"Beachfront Antics / Bike Path Encounters / Home of the Krabby Patty"	2:54
14.	"Story Rewrites / Invincibubble"	2:50
15.	"Chasing Burger Beard / Team Worked"	4:04
16.	"Not So Fast Burger Beard / PlankTON / Real Teamwork"	5:47

=== Reception ===
James Southall of Movie Wave wrote "Given how bitty it is and that many of the cues consist of a number of shorter ones pasted together, it's impressive that it stands up as a listening experience as well as it does – and testament to the composer's skill at crafting decent music for just about any kind of film." Filmtracks.com wrote " there are many things to admire about Debney's continued mastery of the children's genre in The Spongebob Movie: Sponge Out of Water, but this kind of music will test your tolerance for the genre after twenty minutes."
