= It's a SpongeBob Christmas! Album =

Soundtrack album by Various artists
- Released: November 6, 2012
- Recorded: 2009; 2012
- Genres: Christmas; soundtrack
- Length: 21:45
- Label: Nick Records

SpongeBob SquarePants chronology
SpongeBob's Greatest Hits (2009)	It's a SpongeBob Christmas! Album (2012)	Music from The SpongeBob Movie: Sponge Out of Water (2015)

It's a SpongeBob Christmas! Album is a soundtrack album to the SpongeBob SquarePants stop motion Christmas special "It's a SpongeBob Christmas!". It is also the fifth soundtrack to the series. It was released on November 6, 2012. The tracks were co-written by Tom Kenny and Andy Paley. The song "Don't Be a Jerk (It's Christmas)", featured in the special, was written by SpongeBob's voice actor, Tom Kenny in 2009 for the SpongeBob's Greatest Hits album. The album features twelve tracks by “SpongeBob and the Hi-Seas,” including rockabilly (“Christmas Eve Jitters”), country (“Ho-Ho-Hoedown”), and doo-wop (“Wet, Wet Christmas”).

Jessica Dawson of the Common Sense Media said "the fun and fresh Christmas songs actually capture the excitement and anticipation in a way that's a nice change from the traditional yuletide tunes we're all used to." She rated it three of five stars.

== Track listing ==
No.	Title	Length
1.	"SpongeBob SquarePants Theme Song (Christmas Version)"	0:43
2.	"Don't Be a Jerk (It's Christmas)"	2:34
3.	"Christmas Eve Jitters"	1:53
4.	"Santa Won't Let You Down"	2:28
5.	"Snowflakes"	2:23
6.	"Pretty Ribbons and Bows"	2:57
7.	"Wet Wet Christmas"	2:25
8.	"Ho Ho Hoedown"	2:30
9.	"Christmas Is Mine"	1:57
10.	"Hot Fruitcake"	0:44
11.	"Santa Has His Eye on Me"	2:50
12.	"A Holiday Message from SpongeBob SquarePants"	1:02
Total length:		21:45
