= Wild Weekend (NRBQ album) =

Studio album by NRBQ
- Released: 1989
- Genre: Pop, rock
- Label: Virgin
- Producer: Bill Scheniman, Andy Paley

NRBQ chronology
Diggin' Uncle Q (1988)	Wild Weekend (1989)	Peek-A-Boo (1990)

Wild Weekend is an album by the American band NRBQ, released in 1989. It was the band's first studio album in more than five years, due to disputes with their former label, Bearsville Records.

The album peaked at No. 198 on the Billboard 200. It sold around 75,000 copies in its first nine months of release. NRBQ promoted it by touring with R.E.M. The first single was "It's a Wild Weekend", for which the band shot a video. "If I Don't Have You" was the second single.

== Production ==
The album was produced by Bill Scheniman and Andy Paley. Roswell Rudd and John Sebastian contributed to the album. The title track is a cover of the Rockin' Rebels' song, with lyrics and additional instrumentation. "Boozoo, That's Who!" is about Boozoo Chavis; Chavis played accordion on the song. "Poppin' Circumstance" contains a trombone solo. Virgin Records helped the band select tracks for the album.

== Critical reception ==
Professional ratings
Review scores
Source	Rating
AllMusic	2/5 stars
Chicago Sun-Times	3.5/4 stars
Chicago Tribune	3/5 stars
Robert Christgau	B−
The Encyclopedia of Popular Music	2/5 stars
MusicHound Rock: The Essential Album Guide	4/5 stars
The Rolling Stone Album Guide	3/5 stars
Spin Alternative Record Guide	8/10

The Washington Post wrote that the album "harks back to the early '60s, when rock-and-roll didn't take itself quite so seriously, when every single brought forth unforced enthusiasm for a new car, a new guitar sound, a new girl, a new Saturday night." Robert Christgau opined: "First cute, then peculiar, then annoying, their callow act is turning positively perverse as they twinkle-toe past 40." The Chicago Sun-Times noted that "NRBQ has learned to make an album work as an album, rather than as a random selection of cute curiosities or the studio transplant of a bar band."

The New York Times determined that it's the "combination of a hard-driving, eccentric rhythm section, mixed loud and up front, along with the strangely sophisticated and satisfying tunes, that allows the album to radiate so much pleasure." The Los Angeles Times said that Wild Weekend "may well be the finest of the group's 17 albums, bristling with some of the best pop hooks since Brian Wilson's heyday, performed with a playground zeal coupled with a musicianship so good they make it seem effortless."

AllMusic wrote that "the quartet retains its eclectic range of pop and rock mayhem, adapting several well-worn concert favorites for this studio platter." The Rolling Stone Album Guide concluded that "the spaced-out boyish charm starts to grate."

== Track listing ==
No.	Title	Length
1.	"It's a Wild Weekend"	3:26
2.	"Little Floater"	3:06
3.	"Fireworks"	3:34
4.	"Boy's Life"	2:55
5.	"If I Don't Have You"	2:12
6.	"Boozoo, That's Who!"	3:20
7.	"Poppin' Circumstance"	3:20
8.	"The One and Only"	3:42
9.	"Immortal for a While"	2:59
10.	"Fraction of Action"	3:19
11.	"This Love Is True"	2:44
12.	"Like a Locomotive"	3:56
