= SpongeBob's Greatest Hits =

Compilation album by SpongeBob SquarePants
- Released: February 24, 2009 (original); July 14, 2009 (re-release)
- Recorded: 1999–2009
- Genre: Pop rock, surf rock
- Label: Nick Records
- Producer: Stephen Hillenburg

SpongeBob SquarePants chronology
The Best Day Ever (2006)	SpongeBob's Greatest Hits (2009)	It's a SpongeBob Christmas! Album (2012)

Professional ratings
Review scores
Source	Rating
AllMusic	link

SpongeBob's Greatest Hits is the first compilation album for the tenth anniversary of the Nickelodeon animated television series SpongeBob SquarePants. The album was released on February 24, 2009, in conjunction with the year-long celebration of the show's tenth anniversary. The album features many songs released on previous albums, and many featured in the show.

As of 6 October 2010, the album has sold 456,000 copies in the US.

== Track listing ==
1. "SpongeBob SquarePants Theme Song"
2. "The Goofy Goober Song"
3. "F.U.N. Song"
4. "Campfire Song Song"
5. "Ripped Pants"
6. "Where's Gary?"
7. "My Tighty Whiteys"
8. "Doing the Sponge"
9. "Stadium Rave"
10. "Goofy Goober Rock"
11. "The Best Day Ever"
12. "Idiot Friends"
13. "Gary's Song"
14. "I Can't Keep My Eyes Off of You"
15. "The Bubble Song"
16. "This Grill is Not a Home”

=== Re-release ===
The album was re-released on July 14, 2009, with the following changes in the track listing:

14. "The Bubble Song"
15. "SpongeBob SquarePants Theme Song" (performed by Cee-Lo Green)
16. "We've Got Scurvy" (performed by Pink)
17. "Don't Be a Jerk (It's Christmas)"
18. "A Day Like This" (iTunes Store bonus track)

== Charts ==
Chart (2009–13)	Peak position
Australian Hitseeker Albums (ARIA)	2
Austrian Albums (Ö3 Austria)	63
Spanish Albums (PROMUSICAE)	15
US Billboard 200	62
US Kid Albums (Billboard)	2
US Top Soundtracks (Billboard)	8
