= List of T.U.F.F. Puppy episodes =

This is a list of episodes for Nickelodeon's animated television series, T.U.F.F. Puppy. The first two seasons consist of 26 episodes (50 segments each) and the third season consists of 8 episodes (15 segments), for a total of 60 episodes (115 segments).

== Series overview ==
| Season | Segments | Episodes | | Originally released | | |
| Season | Segments | Episodes | | First released | Last released | Network |
|---|---|---|---|---|---|---|
| 1 | 50 | 26 | | October 2, 2010 | May 13, 2012 | Nickelodeon |
| 2 | 17 | 26 (Note: 50 segments total) | 9 | May 27, 2012 | August 9, 2013 | Nickelodeon |
| 2 | 33 | 26 | 17 | October 20, 2013 | May 17, 2014 | Nicktoons |
| 3 | 15 | 8 | | July 26, 2014 | April 4, 2015 | Nicktoons |

== Episodes ==
=== Season 1 (2010–12) ===
This season contained 26 episodes. Episodes 20, 21 and 23 thru 26 and subsequent seasons were produced in high definition (HD).

| No. overall | No. in season | Title | Directed by | Written by | Storyboard by | Original release date | Prod. code | U.S. viewers (millions) |
|---|---|---|---|---|---|---|---|---|
| 1 | 1 | "Purr-fect Partners" | Butch Hartman | Butch Hartman & Scott Fellows | Butch Hartman | October 2, 2010 | 101 | 3.6 |
| 1 | 1 | "Doom-mates" | Butch Hartman & Gary Conrad | Butch Hartman, Scott Fellows, Ray DeLaurentis, Will Schifrin & Kevin Sullivan | Aaron Hammersley | October 2, 2010 | 101 | 3.6 |
"Purr-fect Partners": Dudley Puppy is now a recruited agent of the super-secret undercover organization Turbo Undercover Fighting Force (T.U.F.F.) and his reluctant new partner, Kitty Katswell. The heroic super agents team up to stop Verminious Snaptrap, D.O.O.M.'s ill-mannered supreme leader, from enslaving all of the rats in Petropolis, by using a powerful artifact called the Kruger Rat. Together Dudley and Kitty promise to be quite an imposing crime-fighting duo. "Doom-mates": When Kitty's life is in danger, it's up to Dudley to save his crime-fighting sidekick from the villainous Chameleon. Unfortunately one problem remains: who will protect Kitty from Dudley's unique brand of "protection?"
| 2 | 2 | "Cruisin' for a Bruisin'" | Michelle Bryan | Ray DeLaurentis, Will Schifrin & Kevin Sullivan | Brandon Kruse & Butch Hartman | October 9, 2010 | 104 | 4.2 |
| 2 | 2 | "Puppy Love" | Ken Bruce | Ray DeLaurentis, Will Schifrin & Kevin Sullivan | Greg Rankin, Dave Thomas & Butch Hartman | October 9, 2010 | 104 | 4.2 |
"Cruisin' for a Bruisin'": To distract Dudley from bothering her on T.U.F.F.'s vacation cruise, Kitty lies and tells him that they are on a stakeout. Little does she know, Snaptrap and his iceberg of D.O.O.M. are actually headed right for their cruise ship. "Puppy Love": Dudley gets a crush for the new temp at T.U.F.F., Fifi Oui Oui. Kitty and Keswick help him woo her before realizing it's the Chameleon in disguise bent on destroying T.U.F.F headquarters for good.
| 3 | 3 | "Mall Rat" | Ken Bruce | Butch Hartman, Scott Fellows, Ray DeLaurentis, Will Schifrin & Kevin Sullivan | Heather Martinez | October 16, 2010 | 102 | N/A |
| 3 | 3 | "Operation: Happy Birthday" | Michelle Bryan | Butch Hartman, Scott Fellows, Ray DeLaurentis, Will Schifrin & Kevin Sullivan | Fred Gonzales | October 16, 2010 | 102 | N/A |
"Mall Rat": After spending time in prison, Snaptrap convinces the T.U.F.F. agents that he wants to shed his acts of villainy. Kitty remains unconvinced even when Snaptrap goes on a "good deed" spree and gives out free goodies to the citizens of Petropolis. When Snaptrap reveals his true intentions and launches the crowded Petropolis mall into the sun, it's up to Kitty to save them from imminent danger. "Operation: Happy Birthday": Dudley is determined to give Kitty the best birthday of her life, so he plans a surprise party at T.U.F.F. HQ and give her what she's always wanted: to defeat a bad guy during her special day. But the festivities are threatened when the crime-busting duo's latest mission requires them to stop Snaptrap's plan to rid the world of cheese with a giant cheese magnet.
| 4 | 4 | "Toast of T.U.F.F." | Gary Conrad | Butch Hartman, Scott Fellows, Ray DeLaurentis, Will Schifrin & Kevin Sullivan | Aaron Hammersley | October 23, 2010 | 105 | 4.7 |
| 4 | 4 | "Share-A-Lair" | Michelle Bryan | Butch Hartman, Scott Fellows, Ray DeLaurentis, Will Schifrin & Kevin Sullivan | Fred Gonzales | October 23, 2010 | 105 | 4.7 |
"Toast of T.U.F.F": Keswick invents an artificial intelligence toaster capable of doing much more than making perfect toast. When R.I.T.A. malfunctions and goes out of control, it's up to Dudley and Kitty to save the citizens of Petropolis. "Share-A-Lair": In an ironic twist, T.U.F.F. and D.O.O.M. are forced to share their HQs after destroying each other's headquarters. Before completely obliterating each other, T.U.F.F. and D.O.O.M. realize it's the Chameleon who has turned them against each other in an effort to further his own ambitions of domination (and to also get revenge on D.O.O.M. for not inviting the Chameleon to their ice cream parties).
| 5 | 5 | "Snapnapped" | Michelle Bryan | Butch Hartman & Scott Fellows | Aaron Hammersley | November 6, 2010 | 103 | N/A |
| 5 | 5 | "Mom-A-Geddon" | Gary Conrad | Butch Hartman, Scott Fellows, Ray DeLaurentis, Will Schifrin & Kevin Sullivan | Brandon Kruse & Butch Hartman | November 6, 2010 | 103 | N/A |
"Snapnapped": Keswick is convinced by Snaptrap to build D.O.O.M. a new doomsday device, after he starts feeling unappreciated. "Mom-A-Geddon": Dudley hasn't told his overprotective mother, Peg Puppy, that he is a T.U.F.F. super spy. However, when the maniacal genius Bird Brain and his hummingbird henchman, Zippy take Peg prisoner, Dudley must save her and, in the process, reveal his career as a crime-fighting agent.
| 6 | 6 | "Dog Daze" | Ken Bruce | Ray DeLaurentis, Will Schifrin & Kevin Sullivan | Dave Thomas | November 27, 2010 | 106 | 3.9 |
| 6 | 6 | "Internal Affairs" | Gary Conrad | Ray DeLaurentis, Will Schifrin & Kevin Sullivan | Brandon Kruse & Butch Hartman | November 27, 2010 | 106 | 3.9 |
"Dog Daze": Snaptrap is convinced that he will never be able to reach his goal of supremacy over Petropolis as long as Dudley works for T.U.F.F. Snaptrap hatches a plan—to make Dudley act so crazy that Chief will be forced to fire him. After the Chief fires Dudley, it's up to Kitty to get Dudley back and help him stop Snaptrap and his henchmen from wreaking havoc. "Internal Affairs": When Dudley is accidentally shrunk to the size of a flea, he convinces Chief to be his partner on one last "tiny" super secret mission. However, he questions Chief's judgement when they are both devoured by Chameleon.
| 7 | 7 | "Chilly Dog" | Ken Bruce | Ray DeLaurentis, Will Schifrin & Kevin Sullivan | Aaron Hammersley | November 27, 2010 | 107 | 3.7 |
| 7 | 7 | "The Doomies" | Michelle Bryan | Ray DeLaurentis, Will Schifrin & Kevin Sullivan | Heather Martinez | November 27, 2010 | 107 | 3.7 |
"Chilly Dog": Things get frosty when Dudley and Kitty's latest secret mission requires that the crime-fighting duo go undercover as ice skaters after the world's greatest figure skaters are kidnapped. To get in it will involve some crossdressing... "The Doomies": Disguised as super villains, Dudley and Kitty attend the "Doomie Awards," an award show hosted by Snaptrap in which villains, like Bird Brain and the Chameleon show off some of their pesky and evil moves. Once again, it's up to the fearless heroes to foil each crime before their identities are discovered. Special Guest Stars: Mary Birdsong as Snowflake and Dave Boat as Slush.
| 8 | 8 | "Watch Dog" | Ken Bruce | Ray DeLaurentis, Will Schifrin & Kevin Sullivan | Dave Thomas | January 15, 2011 | 110 | N/A |
| 8 | 8 | "Dog Dish" | Michelle Bryan | Ray DeLaurentis, Will Schifrin & Kevin Sullivan | Aaron Hammersley | January 15, 2011 | 110 | N/A |
"Watch Dog": Using a time travel watch, Dudley tries to go back to the past to outwit Kitty for the last doughnut left in the T.U.F.F. snack room...or know every answer in second grade. However, Dudley somehow accidentally alters the course of time and creates Petropolis in which the malevolent Snaptrap rules and everyone at the agency works for him it is up to Dudley to save Petropolis. "Dog Dish": Dudley's forced to wear an amplified sound neck cone to keep from scratching his butt. When he finally stops sulking, Dudley discovers an ingenious way to use the cone to his advantage to save Kitty from an invisible Snaptrap's horde of dangerous villains.
| 9 | 9 | "Thunder Dog" | Gary Conrad | Ray DeLaurentis, Will Schifrin & Kevin Sullivan | Dave Thomas | February 12, 2011 | 108 | 4.2 |
| 9 | 9 | "Snap Dad" | Michelle Bryan | Ray DeLaurentis, Will Schifrin & Kevin Sullivan | Fred Gonzales | February 12, 2011 | 108 | 4.2 |
"Thunder Dog": Kitty helps Dudley to get rid of his fear of thunder in order to stop Bird Brain from using his thunder cannon, Thunderbird, to bury Petropolis in an avalanche by using a necklace. "Snap Dad": Snaptrap and Dudley's mother, Peg, have fallen in love. Things could not get any worse, or so Dudley thinks, until Snaptrap is inspired by his new girlfriend to turn a new leaf upside down and becomes the newest member of T.U.F.F.
| 10 | 10 | "Iron Mutt" | Ken Bruce | Butch Hartman | Brandon Kruse | February 26, 2011 | 109 | 4.0 |
| 10 | 10 | "The Wrong Stuff" | Gary Conrad | Ray DeLaurentis, Will Schifrin & Kevin Sullivan | Matt Whitlock & Butch Hartman | February 26, 2011 | 109 | 4.0 |
"Iron Mutt": Keswick builds a large body suit that Dudley wore, and refuse to take off, to make him Petropolis's most popular hero, but when all the fame gets to his head and is in danger, it's up to Kitty to save him from Snaptrap. "The Wrong Stuff": Kitty's old partner, Jack Rabbit, tries to recruit Kitty to work for him at his new secret agency S.T.U.F.F. Dudley doesn't trust Jack, and it's revealed that Snaptrap has teamed up with Jack, who plans to drain Kitty's brain. Dudley with Keswick's help saves Kitty from Snaptrap and Jack's clutches in the nick of time.
| 11 | 11 | "Forget Me Mutt" | Michelle Bryan | Ray DeLaurentis, Will Schifrin & Kevin Sullivan | Butch Hartman & Katie Rice | April 9, 2011 | 111 | N/A |
| 11 | 11 | "Mind Trap" | Gary Conrad | Ray DeLaurentis, Will Schifrin & Kevin Sullivan | Fred Gonzales | April 9, 2011 | 111 | N/A |
"Forget Me Mutt": Dudley is the only T.U.F.F. agent who overhears Snaptrap's latest diabolical plan. Unfortunately, he develops a form of amnesia which has him believing he's the Chief, Kitty, Keswick, and Snaptrap. Kitty is left to thwart D.O.O.M.'s latest evil plan: flooding the monorail with sewage. "Mind Trap": Dudley, Kitty, and Keswick try on a mind-reading helmet and are insulted by Chief's secret opinion of them. Snaptrap steals the mind-reading helmet, goes on a wild crime spree and kidnaps the Chief.
| 12 | 12 | "Frisky Business" | John McIntyre | Ray DeLaurentis, Will Schifrin & Kevin Sullivan | Dave Thomas | August 13, 2011 | 113 | 2.9 |
| 12 | 12 | "Hot Dog" | Michelle Bryan | Ray DeLaurentis, Will Schifrin & Kevin Sullivan | Aaron Hammersley | August 13, 2011 | 113 | 2.9 |
"Frisky Business": Peg goes out of town for a few days, leaving Dudley on his own for the first time in his whole life! Dudley can't wait – he'll get to do all the things he doesn't do. However, his immaturity causes him to fail to stop Snaptrap and Ollie from robbing people so he can pay others and the Chameleon from robbing a gas station. Things get worse when Dudley's house is a mess and Peg is coming home. Kitty, Keswick and The Chief must help Dudley (who is wearing his mom's wedding dress as it was the only clean clothes left) clean the house before his mom comes home. "Hot Dog" Dudley's entered the Petropolis Dog Show, but when his finely coiffed fur interferes with his ability to be a T.U.F.F. agent and gets Kitty once again in trouble with the Chameleon, he'll have to make an epic choice: save Kitty or win the coveted pageant prize – his own personal mailman.
| 13 | 13 | "Kid Stuff" | Ken Bruce | Ray DeLaurentis, Will Schifrin & Kevin Sullivan | Aaron Hammersley | August 13, 2011 | 112 | 2.8 |
| 13 | 13 | "Super Duper Crime Busters" | Gary Conrad | Ray DeLaurentis, Will Schifrin & Kevin Sullivan | Butch Hartman & Matt Whitlock | August 13, 2011 | 112 | 2.8 |
"Kid Stuff": After discovering a long-forgotten T.U.F.F. rule that prohibits agents from using their blasters in the presence of children, Snaptrap begins bringing kids to the scene of all of his crimes. By disguising Keswick as a beloved children's TV star, Dudley and Kitty are able to lure the kids to safety and foil Snaptrap's plan. "Super Duper Crime Busters": A documentary-style TV show spends a day profiling T.U.F.F. and its super-star agents, but much to the agents' embarrassment, the television crew arrives on the most boring day at T.U.F.F. Can the T.U.F.F. agents make the television crew impressed in T.U.F.F., or will the television crew consider T.U.F.F. the most boring agency?
| 14 | 14 | "Disobedience School" | Michelle Bryan | Ray DeLaurentis, Will Schifrin & Kevin Sullivan | Butch Hartman | August 16, 2011 | 115 | N/A |
| 14 | 14 | "The Dog Who Cried Fish" | Ken Bruce | Ray DeLaurentis, Will Schifrin & Kevin Sullivan | Fred Gonzales | August 16, 2011 | 115 | N/A |
"Disobedience School": The T.U.F.F. agents are excited to go to Lava Land, until they learn about Snaptrap's new school for criminals. Dudley must go undercover and infiltrate the new school – while the rest of the T.U.F.F. agents have a fun time at Lava Land. "The Dog Who Cried Fish": It's Dudley's turn to pick up the office lunch, but it goes horribly awry when he reels up from the water an insane fish named the Caped Cod, who not only wants to rule the "Above Water", but also destroy Dudley whom he thinks is the king. Special Guest Star: Chris Parnell as The Caped Cod
| 15 | 15 | "The Rat Pack" | Ken Bruce | Ray DeLaurentis, Will Schifrin & Kevin Sullivan | Aaron Hammersley | August 19, 2011 | 117 | N/A |
| 15 | 15 | "Booby Trap" | Michelle Bryan | Ray DeLaurentis, Will Schifrin & Kevin Sullivan | Dave Thomas | August 19, 2011 | 117 | N/A |
"The Rat Pack": When Keswick's cloning machine ends up in the wrong hands, Petropolis is overrun by Snaptraps looting and destroying everything in their path! Things look pretty desperate for T.U.F.F. when Snaptrap sends his clone army to destroy them, but Dudley has a few tricks up his sleeve, including a few extra Dudleys. "Booby Trap": Bird Brain's discovery that he is the last blue-bottomed booby in Petropolis lands him on the endangered species list and, unfortunately, off T.U.F.F.'s "Most Wanted" list as they are not allowed to touch him with his newly acquired status. Dudley and Kitty must stop Bird Brain and his henchmen from hatching a giant booby monster.
| 16 | 16 | "Snappy Campers" | Ken Bruce | Ray DeLaurentis, Will Schifrin & Kevin Sullivan | Aaron Hammersley | September 17, 2011 | 114 | 3.6 |
| 16 | 16 | "Lucky Duck" | Michelle Bryan | Ray DeLaurentis, Will Schifrin & Kevin Sullivan | Dave Thomas | September 17, 2011 | 114 | 3.6 |
"Snappy Campers": Determined to avenge his youth, Snaptrap has returned to Camp Itchy-Owie-Boo-Boo to win the coveted "Camp Champ" award by any means necessary and by cheating. Dudley and Kitty go undercover as campers, but foiling Snaptrap may just push him to do something even more diabolical! "Lucky Duck": Dudley's favorite TV host, Quacky the Duck, attempts to get rid of the chairman to avenge the cancellation of his show.
| 17 | 17 | "The Curse of King Mutt" | Michelle Bryan | Ray DeLaurentis, Joanna Lewis, Will Schifrin & Kevin Sullivan | Fred Gonzales | October 10, 2011 | 118 | N/A |
| 17 | 17 | "Bored of Education" | John McIntyre | Samantha Berger, Ray DeLaurentis, Will Schifrin & Kevin Sullivan | Butch Hartman | October 10, 2011 | 118 | N/A |
"The Curse of King Mutt": Protecting the King Mutt exhibit at the Natural History Museum from all the fiends who want to steal King Mutt's jewel encrusted bone scepter proves to be a lot more challenging than Dudley and Kitty expected. Especially because Dudley can't fight his uncontrollable urge to bury it. Snaptrap, Bird Brain and the Chameleon disguise themselves as King Mutt to trick Dudley into giving them the bone. "Bored of Education": Playing it safe at Career Day turns out to be the most dangerous thing Dudley and Kitty ever do. When the Chameleon entices an entire class of first graders into a life of crime, Dudley and Kitty must convince them that even though being a good guy means following the rules.
| 18 | 18 | "Guard Dog" | John McIntyre | Ray DeLaurentis, Will Schifrin & Kevin Sullivan | Fred Gonzales & Butch Hartman | October 10, 2011 | 119 | N/A |
| 18 | 18 | "Dog Save the Queen" | Ken Bruce | Ray DeLaurentis, Will Schifrin & Kevin Sullivan | Butch Hartman & Ed Baker | October 10, 2011 | 119 | N/A |
"Guard Dog": When the Chameleon witnesses Snaptrap committing a crime in a neighboring town, he agrees to testify against him. It's up to Dudley to keep the Chameleon safe from Snaptrap and D.O.O.M on the long train ride to Petsburgh. But who will keep Dudley safe from the Chameleon's weird habits? Absent: Keswick and the Chief (although he is mentioned) "Dog Save the Queen": When the Chameleon threatens to relieve the Queen of the United Kingdom of her Crown Jewels, Dudley and Kitty are called in to assist B.U.F.F. – the British Undercover Fighting Force. But rooting out the Chameleon in a strange land proves to be quite challenging, especially with the language barrier! Thus they must keep the Chameleon in England because they weren't assisted by S.C.U.F.F., R.U.F.F. or G.R.U.F.F. to go after him. Absent: Keswick and the Chief Special Guest Stars: James Arnold Taylor as Biff and Citizen and Candi Milo as the Queen
| 19 | 19 | "Doom and Gloom" | John McIntyre | Ray DeLaurentis, Will Schifrin & Kevin Sullivan | Fred Gonzales | November 26, 2011 | 116 | N/A |
| 19 | 19 | "Law and Order" | John McIntyre | Ray DeLaurentis, Will Schifrin & Kevin Sullivan | Ed Baker & Butch Hartman | November 26, 2011 | 116 | N/A |
"Doom and Gloom": Larry has finally snapped under Snaptrap's ruthless authority and forms his own evil agency, dubbed G.L.O.O.M. – Genius Larry's Order Of Mayhem. Much to Dudley and Kitty's chagrin, it turns out Larry is better than Snaptrap at being bad! "Law and Odor": Petropolis' worst smelling villain, the Stink Bug, has returned to make life odorous for T.U.F.F. Keswick has a cold and Dudley's super sensitive snout is rendering him helpless. T.U.F.F. needs a plan and fast, before the Stink Bug turns Petropolis into a cesspool of stench! Special Guest Star: Will Matthews as Percival.
| 20 | 20 | "A Doomed Christmas" | Ken Bruce & Michelle Bryan | Ray DeLaurentis, Will Schifrin & Kevin Sullivan | Fred Gonzales & Dave Thomas | December 10, 2011 | 121 | N/A |
Snaptrap, Bird Brain and The Chameleon team up to hijack Christmas. Dudley and Kitty need to stop them and save Santa and his elves before midnight or nobody can get presents this year. Note: This is the first half-hour special.
| 21 | 21 | "Big Dog on Campus" | John McIntyre | Ray DeLaurentis, Will Schifrin & Kevin Sullivan | Aaron Hammersley | January 16, 2012 | 122 | N/A |
| 21 | 21 | "Dog's Best Friend" | Ken Bruce | Ray DeLaurentis, Will Schifrin & Kevin Sullivan | Steve Daye & Butch Hartman | January 16, 2012 | 122 | N/A |
"Big Dog on Campus": Dudley and Kitty go undercover at Dudley's high school reunion to stop an unknown villain from blowing up the reunion. "Dog's Best Friend": Snaptrap sends a killer robot to destroy T.U.F.F., but Dudley finds it and befriends it. Special Guest Stars: Candi Milo as Lunch Ladybug, Female Teen, and Classmate #1
| 22 | 22 | "Mission: Really Big Mission" | Michelle Bryan & Ken Bruce | Ray DeLaurentis, Will Schifrin & Kevin Sullivan | Fred Gonzales & Dave Thomas | March 31, 2012 | 120 | N/A |
While in a mission in space, Dudley accidentally causes the new T.U.F.F-Turbo-Laser to break into 3 pieces. Snaptrap wants the laser for himself so he can heat up all the corn in the earth's "corn belt" and raise the prices for movie popcorn so that he D.O.O.M, and the Chameleon can get rich quick. However, Snaptrap does not know that using the laser to heat the corn belt will result in the earth's total destruction. The race is on as Dudley and Kitty travel to the ocean floor, into a volcano miles below the surface of the earth, and to a suburban house outside of Petropolis, in order to try to get all 3 pieces of the laser back before Snaptrap, D.O.O.M and The Chameleon do.
| 23 | 23 | "Monkey Business" | Michelle Bryan | Ray DeLaurentis, Will Schifrin & Kevin Sullivan | Dave Thomas | April 21, 2012 | 125 | N/A |
| 23 | 23 | "Diary of a Mad Cat" | Ken Bruce | Butch Hartman | Fred Gonzales | April 21, 2012 | 125 | N/A |
"Monkey Business": A popular boy band named the Hunkey Monkeys need T.U.F.F. to protect them, but Dudley is no fan of theirs. However, Bird Brain kidnaps the band and plans to use their singing to open a portal to another dimension. Dudley and Kitty must stop Bird Brain before the world is destroyed. "Diary of a Mad Cat": Dudley erroneously leaks out Kitty's diary in a mass e-mail, exposing her vulnerabilities to Bird Brain and the Chameleon. The two villains plan to use a weather machine to make it snow on Maui. Meanwhile, Keswick, the Chief, Snaptrap and Larry win a trip to Hawaii.
| 24 | 24 | "Dudley Do-Wrong" | John McIntyre | Ray DeLaurentis, Will Schifrin & Kevin Sullivan | Fred Gonzales | May 6, 2012 | 123 | N/A |
| 24 | 24 | "Puppy Unplugged" | Michelle Bryan | Ray DeLaurentis, Will Schifrin & Kevin Sullivan | Celia Kendrick & Butch Hartman | May 6, 2012 | 123 | N/A |
"Dudley Do-Wrong": The Chameleon poses as the mayor and shuts down T.U.F.F. "Puppy Unplugged": Bird Brain cuts out the power to Petropolis and eradicates technology.
| 25 | 25 | "Top Dog" | John McIntyre | Ray DeLaurentis, Will Schifrin & Kevin Sullivan | Steve Daye & Dave Thomas | May 20, 2012 | 124 | N/A |
| 25 | 25 | "Quack in the Box" | Ken Bruce | Ray DeLaurentis, Will Schifrin & Kevin Sullivan | Butch Hartman | May 20, 2012 | 124 | N/A |
"Top Dog": While Dudley overzealously takes over for a sick Chief, the Fiendish League of Potential Perpetrators, or F.L.O.P.P. for short, attempts to make their crime debut! "Quack in the Box": Quacky and the Sharing Moose are back to get revenge on Dudley for putting them in jail. They open a fast food chain and try to frame Dudley for taking out the competition!
| 26 | 26 | "Lie Like a Dog" | John McIntyre | Ray DeLaurentis, Will Schifrin & Kevin Sullivan | Butch Hartman | May 27, 2012 | 126 | 2.3 |
| 26 | 26 | "Cold Fish" | Michelle Bryan | Ray DeLaurentis, Will Schifrin & Kevin Sullivan | Celia Kendrick, Dave Thomas & Butch Hartman | May 27, 2012 | 126 | 2.3 |
"Lie Like A Dog": Dudley constantly lies about having a dentist appointment to get out of work at T.U.F.F., but he ends up stopping Snaptrap, D.O.O.M and The Chameleon while he is relaxing, and he has to conceal his identity when he is caught on camera, and he can't claim the rewards he is offered for fear of exposure. "Cold Fish": The deranged Caped Cod has escaped and vows to destroy Petropolis by melting the Rhode Island-sized Ice Bird Iceberg and flooding the city. Dudley's not sure who the real enemy is – the Caped Cod or the pants Dudley has to wear to stay warm enough to defeat him. Special Guest Star: Mick Wingert as The Caped Cod.

=== Season 2 (2012–14) ===
T.U.F.F. Puppy was picked up for a second season with 26 episodes. All episodes from May 27, 2012 to April 4, 2015 have been produced in high definition.

| No. overall | No. in season | Title | Directed by | Written by | Storyboard by | Original release date | Prod. code | U.S. viewers (millions) |
|---|---|---|---|---|---|---|---|---|
| 27 | 1 | "Freaky Spy Day" | John McIntyre | Ray DeLaurentis, Will Schifrin & Kevin Sullivan | Fred Gonzales | May 13, 2012 | 202 | N/A |
| 27 | 1 | "Dog Tired" | Ken Bruce | Ray DeLaurentis, Will Schifrin & Kevin Sullivan | Celia Kendrick & Dave Thomas | May 13, 2012 | 202 | N/A |
"Freaky Spy Day": Dudley overhears a voicemail message from Kitty's old partner, Jack Rabbit, asking her to meet up, but Dudley's convinced that he's up to no good. Using a brain switching device, Dudley switches brains with Kitty and spends the day with Jack in Kitty's body. However, Jack tricks Dudley (in Kitty's body) into helping him access T.U.F.F's secret computer room and download a list containing every undercover T.U.F.F agent as part of a deal with Snaptrap. "Dog Tired": When Snaptrap gets his hands on a Dream Destroyer, from The Evil Shopping Channel (hosted by the Chameleon) he plans on using it on to make Dudley's dreams so good he never wants to wake up.
| 28 | 2 | "Pup Daddy" | Ken Bruce | Ray DeLaurentis, Joanna Lewis, Will Schifrin & Kevin Sullivan | Dave Thomas | June 3, 2012 | 201 | 2.1 |
| 28 | 2 | "Candy Cane-ine" | Michelle Bryan | Ray DeLaurentis, Joanna Lewis, Will Schifrin & Kevin Sullivan | Steve Daye & Butch Hartman | June 3, 2012 | 201 | 2.1 |
"Pup Daddy": Dudley accidentally turns the T.U.F.F. agents and Snaptrap into teenagers, kids/toddlers, and babies with Keswick's Young Gun. Snaptrap steals the Young Gun and uses it on his henchmen to help him cause mischief. Dudley must get the Young Gun back before the T.U.F.F agents, Snaptrap and D.O.O.M cease to exist. "Candy Cane-ine": A candy maker named Willy Wombat (who is actually The Chameleon in disguise) enlists T.U.F.F.'s help to test his security system he's using to protect his new top secret candy, The Atomic Bomb Pop.
| 29 | 3 | "Bark to the Future" | John McIntyre | Ray DeLaurentis, Will Schifrin & Kevin Sullivan | Wolf-Rüdiger Bloss | October 13, 2012 | 205 | 1.8 |
| 29 | 3 | "Lights, Camera, Quacktion" | Ken Bruce | Ray DeLaurentis, Will Schifrin & Kevin Sullivan | Brandon Kruse | October 13, 2012 | 205 | 1.8 |
"Bark to the Future": Keswick is working on an invention that will allow the T.U.F.F. agents to see the Chameleon no matter what he turns into. In an effort to get his hands on the invention, the Chameleon turns into Dudley and convinces him that he's future Dudley. "Lights, Camera, Quacktion": Quacky the Duck and the Sharing Moose cast the T.U.F.F agents in their latest movie called "Not a Real Movie," in a genius plot to get the agents to steal gold and frame them.
| 30 | 4 | "Happy Howl-O-Ween" | Ken Bruce & Michelle Bryan | Ray DeLaurentis, Will Schifrin & Kevin Sullivan | Wolf-Rüdiger Bloss & Brandon Kruse | October 27, 2012 | 210 | 1.6 |
Dudley and Kitty try to stop Snaptrap, Bird Brain and The Chameleon from ruining Halloween. To make matters worse, they must also deal with some zombies.
| 31 | 5 | "Bark to Nature" | Michelle Bryan | Ray DeLaurentis, Will Schifrin & Kevin Sullivan | Dave Thomas | August 5, 2013 | 213 | 1.9 |
| 31 | 5 | "Mutts and Bolts" | Ken Bruce | Kevin Arrieta, Ray DeLaurentis, Will Schifrin & Kevin Sullivan | Brandon Kruse | August 5, 2013 | 213 | 1.9 |
"Bark to Nature": After getting information of Snaptrap stealing picnic baskets in Yellowbone Park, the T.U.F.F. agents use Keswick's new RV to drive to Yellowbone Park and stop Snaptrap. "Mutts and Bolts": After getting struck by lightning, Dudley can now predict the future. However, Snaptrap plans to also get struck by lightning so he can also predict the future. Note: This episode aired on Nickelodeon in Latin America, Italy and Poland before airing in the US. Special Guest Star: Joanna Lewis as Brooke.
| 32 | 6 | "Dog House" | John McIntyre | Ray DeLaurentis, Joanna Lewis, Will Schifrin & Kevin Sullivan | Dave Thomas | August 6, 2013 | 203 | 1.6 |
| 32 | 6 | "Time Waits for No Mutt" | Michelle Bryan | Ray DeLaurentis, Will Schifrin & Kevin Sullivan | Butch Hartman | August 6, 2013 | 203 | 1.6 |
"Dog House": Snaptrap tries to get close to Dudley under the disguise of a new roommate named Partpants, which is his name spelled backwards. "Time Waits for No Mutt": After always being constantly late, Dudley is warned by The Chief that if he's late one more time he is fired. So Dudley must try to get to work on time but Snaptrap, Bird Brain and the Chameleon plan to stop him at all costs. Note: This episode aired on Nickelodeon in Latin America, Germany, Southeast Asia, Russia, Spain, Italy, Greece and Poland before airing in the US.
| 33 | 7 | "Mud with Power" | Ken Bruce | Kevin Arrieta | Steve Daye | August 7, 2013 | 219 | 1.6 |
| 33 | 7 | "Legal Beagle" | Michelle Bryan | Kevin Arrieta, Ray DeLaurentis, Joanna Lewis, Will Schifrin, Kristine Songco & Kevin Sullivan | Fred Gonzales | August 7, 2013 | 219 | 1.6 |
"Mud With Power": Dudley wants to be in charge of something, so he orders creatures called Mudbuglets. Then they evolve and team up with Snaptrap to defeat Dudley. "Legal Beagle": Dudley decides to follow a book filled with stupid laws. Meanwhile, Snaptrap, Bird Brain and the Chameleon plan to blow up T.U.F.F. since it is legal. To stop the villains, Dudley, Kitty, Keswick and the Chief must find a descendent of the book's author to undo the book's laws.
| 34 | 8 | "Hush Puppy" | John McIntyre | Ray DeLaurentis, Will Schifrin & Kevin Sullivan | Fred Gonzales | August 8, 2013 | 209 | 1.8 |
| 34 | 8 | "Quacky Birthday" | Michelle Bryan | Ray DeLaurentis, Will Schifrin & Kevin Sullivan | Steve Daye | August 8, 2013 | 209 | 1.8 |
"Hush Puppy": Kitty, Keswick and The Chief can't support that Dudley yells all the time. Dudley's yelling has caused him and Kitty to fail in stopping Snaptrap from getting rid of yo-yos and Bird Brain from stealing wigs Keswick decides to put Dudley on a special collar that blocks his voice. However, The Caped Cod plans to flood the city by placing it under a giant glass dome. Kitty, Keswick and the Chief must find the right key fob that unlocks the collar so Dudley can talk again. "Quacky Birthday": Just a few days until Dudley's birthday, both Quacky the Duck and Sharing Moose come to offer a false place to celebrate his birthday. Note: This episode aired on Nickelodeon in Latin America, Italy, Greece and Poland before airing in the US. Special Guest Star: Mick Wingert as The Caped Cod.
| 35 | 9 | "Sheep Dog" | John McIntyre | Joanna Lewis & Kristine Songco | Brandon Kruse | August 9, 2013 | 223 | 1.4 |
| 35 | 9 | "Mom's Away" | Ken Bruce | Whitney Fox, Joanna Lewis & Kristine Songco | Wolf-Rüdiger Bloss & Butch Hartman | August 9, 2013 | 223 | 1.4 |
"Sheep Dog": Dudley goes undercover as a lady sheep to catch the Chameleon. "Mom's Away": T.U.F.F. gets information that Snaptrap has taken all the mothers, including Dudley's mother, Peg. Note: That was the last episode to premiere on Nickelodeon, future episode would instead start airing on Nicktoons.
| 36 | 10 | "Love Bird" | Ken Bruce | Ray DeLaurentis, Will Schifrin & Kevin Sullivan | Steve Daye | October 20, 2013 (Nicktoons) | 204 | 0.3 |
| 36 | 10 | "Bluff Puppy" | Michelle Bryan | Ray DeLaurentis, Will Schifrin & Kevin Sullivan | Fred Gonzales | October 20, 2013 (Nicktoons) | 204 | 0.3 |
"Love Bird": Bird Brain invents the "Lovey-Dovey-Kissy-Smoochy" gun, a device that makes his target fall madly in love with him, and give him whatever he wants. He tests it at the First Petropolis Bank, where he attempts to put the bank's loan manager Becky under his spell, but Dudley shields her from the blast and he winds up falling in love with Bird Brain instead. "Bluff Puppy": F.L.O.P.P. returns to commit crimes with the help of a buffalo named Bluffalo, who just lies about committing crimes, rather than committing them at all. Note: This episode aired on Nickelodeon in Latin America, Germany, Southeast Asia, Russia, Spain, Italy, Greece and Poland before airing in the US.
| 37 | 11 | "Rat Trap" | Ken Bruce | Ray DeLaurentis, Will Schifrin & Kevin Sullivan | Fred Gonzales | October 27, 2013 (Nicktoons) | 207 | 0.2 |
| 37 | 11 | "Agent of the Year" | Michelle Bryan | Ray DeLaurentis, Will Schifrin & Kevin Sullivan | Wolf-Rüdiger Bloss | October 27, 2013 (Nicktoons) | 207 | 0.2 |
"Rat Trap": Dudley and Kitty take pity on Snaptrap and plan a staged arrest at the Snaptrap family reunion. "Agent of the Year": Dudley and Kitty find out they've made the same number of arrests and are tied for the Agent of the Year award, so they both go on an arresting-spree to see who will win the award. Note: This episode was originally scheduled to air on October 20, 2012, but it was pulled due to a last minute scheduling change. However, it aired on Nickelodeon in Latin America, Italy, Greece and Poland before airing in the US.
| 38 | 12 | "Barking Tall" | Michelle Bryan | Kevin Arrieta, Ray DeLaurentis, Will Schifrin & Kevin Sullivan | Fred Gonzales | November 3, 2013 (Nicktoons) | 212 | 0.3 |
| 38 | 12 | "Bad Eggs" | John McIntyre | Joanna Lewis & Kristine Songco | Wolf-Rüdiger Bloss | November 3, 2013 (Nicktoons) | 212 | 0.3 |
"Barking Tall": Dudley wants to be taller, so he uses Keswick's growth spray, the Grow-Faster Blaster. After Dudley uses his giant size to defeat Bird Brain, he starts to grow taller. Bird Brain steals the Grow-Faster Blaster to make himself taller to destroy anything that flies. "Bad Eggs": Bird Brain steals eggs from the delivery ward of a hospital to hatch them with his evil incubator, thus getting a new army to replace his annoying henchmen. Note: This episode aired on Nickelodeon in Latin America, Russia, Italy and Poland before airing in the US. Special Guest Star: Joanna Lewis as Chicken Mom.
| 39 | 13 | "Carbon Copies" | John McIntyre | Ray DeLaurentis, Will Schifrin & Kevin Sullivan | Steve Daye | November 10, 2013 (Nicktoons) | 214 | 0.2 |
| 39 | 13 | "TUFF Cookies" | Ken Bruce | Ray DeLaurentis, Will Schifrin & Kevin Sullivan | Fred Gonzales | November 10, 2013 (Nicktoons) | 214 | 0.2 |
"Carbon Copies": Dudley is playing in Keswick's imagination station, but when he leaves the door open, his imaginations escape and cause havoc in Petropolis. "TUFF Cookies": Dudley is sad because he has never been a spokesman, he accepts to be in Quacky the Duck's commercial for his new cookie brand "Animal Quackers". Note: This episode aired on Nickelodeon in Latin America, Russia, Italy and Poland before airing in the US.
| 40 | 14 | "Subliminal Criminal" | John McIntyre | Ray DeLaurentis, Will Schifrin & Kevin Sullivan | Brandon Kruse | November 17, 2013 (Nicktoons) | 215 | 0.2 |
| 40 | 14 | "Acting T.U.F.F." | Michelle Bryan | Ray DeLaurentis, Will Schifrin & Kevin Sullivan | Wolf-Rüdiger Bloss | November 17, 2013 (Nicktoons) | 215 | 0.2 |
"Subliminal Criminal": Dudley drinks Keswick's formula to understand criminal minds. "Acting T.U.F.F.": Dudley's favorite actor Woodchuck Norris comes to make a movie at T.U.F.F. Special Guest Star: Joanna Lewis as Old Lady
| 41 | 15 | "Close Encounters of the Doomed Kind" | Michelle Bryan | Ray DeLaurentis, Will Schifrin & Kevin Sullivan | Dave Thomas | December 27, 2013 (Nicktoons) | 206 | 0.2 |
| 41 | 15 | "Golden Retriever" | John McIntyre | Ray DeLaurentis, Will Schifrin & Kevin Sullivan | Steve Daye | December 27, 2013 (Nicktoons) | 206 | 0.2 |
"Close Encounters of the Doomed Kind": Snaptrap steals an alien ship and uses its weapons to wreak havoc on Petropolis. "Golden Retriever": D.O.O.M. search for a gold nugget in a town from the Old West, and their actions could result in the town collapsing. Note: This episode was originally scheduled to air on December 8, 2012, but it was pulled due to a last minute scheduling change. However, it aired on Nickelodeon in Latin America, Russia, Italy, Greece and Poland before airing in the US.
| 42 | 16 | "'Til Doom Do Us Part" | John McIntyre & Ken Bruce | Ray DeLaurentis, Will Schifrin & Kevin Sullivan | Dave Thomas & Steve Daye | February 14, 2014 (Nicktoons) | 211 | N/A |
Snaptrap, D.O.O.M, and The Chameleon are stealing gifts at weddings. Dudley and Kitty must marry in an attempt to stop them. Note: This episode aired on Nickelodeon in Latin America, Italy, Russia and Poland before airing in the US.
| 43 | 17 | "Crime Takes a Holiday" | Michelle Bryan | Ray DeLaurentis, Will Schifrin & Kevin Sullivan | Wolf-Rüdiger Bloss | April 19, 2014 (Nicktoons) | 224 | TBA |
| 43 | 17 | "Flower Power" | John McIntyre | Joanna Lewis & Kristine Songco | Fred Gonzales | April 19, 2014 (Nicktoons) | 224 | TBA |
"Crime Takes a Holiday": The Chameleon and Bird Brain disguise themselves as the Easter Bunny and Santa Claus go on a crime spree in Petropolis. Dudley is iffy about stopping them because he thinks The Chameleon and Bird Brain are actually the Easter Bunny and Santa Claus. Meanwhile, Snaptrap becomes a new holiday icon named Toilet-Breath Terry. "Flower Power": Bird Brain finds a rare flower that makes him indestructible. Dudley and Kitty go to the rainforest to stop him. Note: This episode aired on Nickelodeon in Australia, New Zealand and Latin America before airing in the US.
| 44 | 18 | "The Spelling Bee" | Ken Bruce | Kevin Arrieta, Ray DeLaurentis, Joanna Lewis, Will Schifrin, Kristine Songco & Kevin Sullivan | Brandon Kruse | April 19, 2014 (Nicktoons) | 220 | TBA |
| 44 | 18 | "House Broken" | John McIntyre | Ray DeLaurentis, Will Schifrin & Kevin Sullivan | Wolf-Rüdiger Bloss | April 19, 2014 (Nicktoons) | 220 | TBA |
"The Spelling Bee": The Wanna-bee snatches all the kids at the spelling bee and challenges Dudley to a spelling competition. "House Broken": While T.U.F.F. is away travelling, Snaptrap breaks into Keswick's house to steal his latest invention, the head shrinker. However, the whole trip is just a fake. Note: This episode aired on Nickelodeon in Australia, New Zealand and Latin America before airing in the US.
| 45 | 19 | "T.U.F.F. Choices" | Ken Bruce | Ray DeLaurentis, Will Schifrin & Kevin Sullivan | Dave Thomas | April 26, 2014 (Nicktoons) | 208 | 0.1 |
| 45 | 19 | "Sob Story" | John McIntyre | Samantha Berger, Joanna Lewis, Ray DeLaurentis, Will Schifrin & Kevin Sullivan | Brandon Kruse | April 26, 2014 (Nicktoons) | 208 | 0.1 |
"T.U.F.F. Choices": Snaptrap uses an indecision ray on T.U.F.F. "Sob Story": Dudley uses fake tears to get whatever he wants, but his excessive crying soon leads to others questioning his ability to fight Snaptrap, D.O.O.M and the Chameleon. Note: This episode was originally scheduled to air on December 15, 2012, but it was pulled due to a last minute scheduling change. However, it aired on Nickelodeon in Latin America, Greece, Italy, Russia and Poland before airing in the US.
| 46 | 20 | "T.U.F.F. Sell" | Ken Bruce | Kevin Arrieta, Ray DeLaurentis, Joanna Lewis, Will Schifrin, Kristine Songco & Kevin Sullivan | Dave Thomas & Butch Hartman | April 26, 2014 (Nicktoons) | 216 | 0.1 |
| 46 | 20 | "Tattle Tale" | Michelle Bryan | Ray DeLaurentis, Will Schifrin & Kevin Sullivan | Steve Daye | April 26, 2014 (Nicktoons) | 216 | 0.1 |
"T.U.F.F. Sell": Snaptrap buys T.U.F.F. and Dudley continues to work there after Kitty, Keswick and the Chief quit. However, Snaptrap and his henchmen plan to use four keys to unlock T.U.F.F's missile system to destroy a toy factory. "Tattle Tale": F.L.O.P.P. sends Wanna-bee to go and rat out Dudley and Kitty when they get photos of them sleeping on the job. Note: This episode aired on Nickelodeon in Australia, New Zealand and Latin America before airing in the US.
| 47 | 21 | "True Spies" | John McIntyre | Kristine Songco | Butch Hartman | May 3, 2014 (Nicktoons) | 218 | 0.1 |
| 47 | 21 | "Bagel and the Beast" | Michelle Bryan | Ray DeLaurentis, Joanna Lewis, Will Schifrin & Kevin Sullivan | Brandon Kruse | May 3, 2014 (Nicktoons) | 218 | 0.1 |
"True Spies": Kitty and Dudley accidentally eat Keswick's truth syrup and can't stop telling the truth. Snaptrap and D.O.O.M take advantage of this by trying to activate a device that unravels fabric. "Bagel and the Beast": Everyone in Petropolis is convinced that Bigfoot is a robber, so Dudley tries to clear his childhood hero's name. However, Snaptap is disguised as Bigfoot. Note: This episode aired on Nickelodeon in Australia, New Zealand and Latin America before airing in the US.
| 48 | 22 | "Dancin' Machine" | Michelle Bryan | Joanna Lewis & Kristine Songco | Butch Hartman | May 3, 2014 (Nicktoons) | 221 | 0.1 |
| 48 | 22 | "The Good, the Bad and the Quacky" | John McIntyre | Joanna Lewis & Kristine Songco | Steve Daye | May 3, 2014 (Nicktoons) | 221 | 0.1 |
"Dancin' Machine": Dudley teams up with the Chameleon for Petropolis' dancing competition. Being a terrible dancer, Kitty asks Snaptrap for help and eventually helps Dudley stop the Chameleon. "The Good, The Bad and The Quacky": Quacky and the Sharing Moose stage a fake reality show and invite T.U.F.F. to compete against Snaptrap, Bird Brain and the Chameleon live on the show. But this reality show is part of Quacky's plan to eliminate T.U.F.F and their criminal competition. Note: This episode aired on Nickelodeon in Australia, New Zealand and Latin America before airing in the US.
| 49 | 23 | "Pup Goes the Weasel" | Michelle Bryan | Joanna Lewis & Kristine Songco | Wolf-Rüdiger Bloss | May 10, 2014 (Nicktoons) | 222 | 0.1 |
| 49 | 23 | "Puppy Pause" | Ken Bruce | Ray DeLaurentis, Will Schifrin & Kevin Sullivan | Fred Gonzales | May 10, 2014 (Nicktoons) | 222 | 0.1 |
"Pup Goes The Weasel": The Weasel, a super diabolical criminal, has broken out of prison and is after Dudley and Snaptrap. "Puppy Pause": Dudley finds time-stopping gloves that freeze time. Snaptrap steals them and T.U.F.F. must get them back before time stops forever. Note: This episode aired on Nickelodeon in Australia, New Zealand and Latin America before airing in the US.
| 50 | 24 | "Match Me If You Can" | Michelle Bryan | Joanna Lewis & Kristine Songco | Brandon Kruse | May 10, 2014 (Nicktoons) | 225 | 0.1 |
| 50 | 24 | "Organized Crime" | Ken Bruce | Joanna Lewis & Kristine Songco | Wolf-Rüdiger Bloss | May 10, 2014 (Nicktoons) | 225 | 0.1 |
"Match Me If You Can": An efficiency test reveals that Dudley and Kitty are not well suited as partners, thus they are reassigned. Kitty is paired with Keswick, while Dudley is paired with the Chief. However, Snaptrap, D.O.O.M, Bird Brain and the Chameleon plan to steal an orchestra, china and spaghetti for their bi-monthly dinner. "Organized Crime": T.U.F.F. secretary Tammy is kidnapped by F.L.O.P.P., so Dudley and Kitty must rescue her.
| 51 | 25 | "A Tale of Two Kitties" | John McIntyre | Ray DeLaurentis, Will Schifrin & Kevin Sullivan | Fred Gonzales | May 17, 2014 (Nicktoons) | 217 | N/A |
| 51 | 25 | "Pup in the Air" | Ken Bruce | Kevin Arrieta, Ray DeLaurentis, Joanna Lewis, Will Schifrin, Kristine Songco & Kevin Sullivan | Wolf-Rüdiger Bloss | May 17, 2014 (Nicktoons) | 217 | N/A |
"A Tale of Two Kitties": Kitty's evil twin sister Katty Katswell swaps places with Kitty to steal the golden fish bowl at the Petropolis Museum. "Pup in the Air": Bird Brain uses an anti-gravity device to fly, however, he cranks the device up and all of Petropolis is floating. Note: This episode aired on Nickelodeon in Australia, New Zealand and Latin America before airing in the US. "Pup in the Air" was released as a bonus episode on the Nicktoons website in the US.
| 52 | 26 | "Girlfriend or Foe?" | John McIntyre | Ray DeLaurentis, Joanna Lewis, Will Schifrin, Kristine Songco & Kevin Sullivan | Fred Gonzales & Butch Hartman | May 17, 2014 (Nicktoons) | 226 | N/A |
| 52 | 26 | "Scared Wit-Less" | Ken Bruce | Ray DeLaurentis, Joanna Lewis, Will Schifrin, Kristine Songco & Kevin Sullivan | Steve Daye | May 17, 2014 (Nicktoons) | 226 | N/A |
"Girlfriend or Foe?": Kitty grows suspicious of Dudley's new girlfriend, Daisy because she thinks she's spying for Snaptrap. However, it is revealed that Larry is the real spy and Snaptrap plans to blow up T.U.F.F with cheat-seeking missiles because Larry cheats at hide and seek. "Scared Wit-Less": Snaptrap poses as a safety instructor and scares Dudley out of being a secret agent.

=== Season 3 (2014–15) ===
T.U.F.F. Puppy was picked up for a third season with 8 episodes. All of season three aired on Nicktoons.

| No. overall | No. in season | Title | Directed by | Written by | Storyboard by | Original release date | Prod. code | U.S. viewers (millions) |
|---|---|---|---|---|---|---|---|---|
| 53 | 1 | "T.U.F.F. Break Up" | Ken Bruce & Kevin Petrilak | Ray DeLaurentis, Will Schifrin & Kevin Sullivan | Fred Gonzales, Butch Hartman & Christo Stamboliev | July 26, 2014 | 308 | N/A |
Dudley, Kitty & Keswick quit work because they feel unappreciated, but later they are needed when the Chief gets abducted by a new villain, the Overbear.
| 54 | 2 | "T.U.F.F. Love" | Kevin Petrilak | Ray DeLaurentis, Joanna Lewis, Will Schifrin, Kristine Songco & Kevin Sullivan | Butch Hartman & Christo Stamboliev | February 14, 2015 | 305 | 0.11 |
| 54 | 2 | "Soar Loser" | Ken Bruce | Whitney Fox, Joanna Lewis & Kristine Songco | Steve Daye | February 14, 2015 | 305 | 0.11 |
"T.U.F.F. Love": Keswick enlists the help of Dudley to woo his dream girl, Tammy. Dudley asks Snaptrap and Bird Brain for help, but they fail. The two villains end up in the hospital and decide to build a robotic version of Tammy to destroy T.U.F.F. "Soar Loser": Bird Brain steals the new Skatebird to get revenge on the Owl Force Academy for rejecting his application.
| 55 | 3 | "Dead or a Lie" | John McIntyre | Joanna Lewis | Fred Gonzales | February 28, 2015 | 306 | N/A |
| 55 | 3 | "Tourist Trap" | Ken Bruce | Joanna Lewis & Kristine Songco | Wolf-Rüdiger Bloss | February 28, 2015 | 306 | N/A |
"Dead or a Lie": Dudley pretends to have eaten poisonous cupcakes made by the Chameleon to save Kitty, so she tries to make his possibly last day his best ever. Meanwhile, The Chameleon uses the same lie to hang out with Snaptrap and Bird Brain. After Kitty ends up in the hospital, Dudley must save her from eating poisonous cupcakes given to her by the Chameleon. "Tourist Trap": Kitty and Dudley win a trip to Hawaii along with Snaptrap, but Kitty ends up being kidnapped by the Weasel. Absent: Keswick and the Chief
| 56 | 4 | "Hide and Ghost Seek" | John McIntyre | Whitney Fox, Joanna Lewis & Kristine Songco | Brandon Kruse | March 7, 2015 | 304 | N/A |
| 56 | 4 | "Cod Squad" | Kevin Petrilak | Ray DeLaurentis, Will Schifrin & Kevin Sullivan | Wolf-Rüdiger Bloss | March 7, 2015 | 304 | N/A |
"Hide and Ghost Seek": T.U.F.F. is hired to get rid of a ghost inside an old mansion, not knowing that The Chameleon tricked them into going inside the mansion, and teamed up with Snaptrap trap them inside. Kitty must save Dudley, Keswick and the Chief before the mansion is destroyed at sunrise. "Cod Squad": The Caped Cod puts a robotic shark in the lake to nab the fishermen in Petropolis. Special Guest Star: Mick Wingert as The Caped Cod
| 57 | 5 | "Barking Bad" | Michelle Bryan | Joanna Lewis & Kristine Songco | Fred Gonzales | March 14, 2015 | 301 | N/A |
| 57 | 5 | "Smarty Pants" | John McIntyre | Kristine Songco | Wolf-Rüdiger Bloss | March 14, 2015 | 301 | N/A |
"Barking Bad": After getting Bird Brain's newest invention, the "De-Good-Ifyer", Dudley accidentally turns Kitty, Keswick and the Chief evil. Dudley teams up with Snaptrap, Bird Brain and the Chameleon to turn Kitty, Keswick and the Chief back to normal before they turn the entire city evil. "Smarty Pants": Keswick has created a pair of pants that turn Dudley into a genius but make him care less for his friends. Meanwhile, Keswick becomes dumb as a side effect and Snaptrap, Bird Brain and the Chameleon team up to destroy a toy factory that stole their idea for stuffed animals filled with weapons.
| 58 | 6 | "Great Scott" | Ken Bruce | Ray DeLaurentis, Will Schifrin & Kevin Sullivan | Brandon Kruse | March 21, 2015 | 302 | N/A |
| 58 | 6 | "To Be or Not to Bee" | Kevin Petrilak | Kevin Sullivan | Steve Daye | March 21, 2015 | 302 | N/A |
"Great Scott": T.U.F.F. goes to Scotland because Dudley is a descendant of a legendary Scotland hero who defeated the Loch Ness Monster However, the Chameleon disguises himself as the Loch Ness Monster to help Snaptrap and Larry to destroy souvenir stands. "To Be or Not to Bee": Dudley and the Wanna Bee team up to defeat Wanna Bee's brother who got mutated by scientists and plans to rule the world by turning everyone into zombies. Special Guest Star: Mick Wingert as Angus, credited as Chief of S.C.U.F.F.
| 59 | 7 | "While the Cats Away" | John McIntyre | Ray DeLaurentis, Will Schifrin & Kevin Sullivan | Butch Hartman & Christo Stamboliev | March 28, 2015 | 303 | N/A |
| 59 | 7 | "Sweet Revenge" | Ken Bruce | Kristine Songco & Joanna Lewis | Fred Gonzales | March 28, 2015 | 303 | N/A |
"While the Cats Away": Kitty is having trouble taking a break from work so Dudley is assigned to teach her. However, Bird Brain and the Chameleon team up to flood T.U.F.F and drown everyone inside. "Sweet Revenge": In an attempt to sell his honey as a pancake topping the Wanna-bee tries to destroy Petropolis' supply of maple syrup.
| 60 | 8 | "Puff Puppy" | John McIntyre | Whitney Fox, Joanna Lewis & Kristine Songco | Butch Hartman & Mike Dougherty | April 4, 2015 | 307 | N/A |
| 60 | 8 | "Stressed to Kill" | Kevin Petrilak | Whitney Fox, Joanna Lewis & Kristine Songco | Brandon Kruse | April 4, 2015 | 307 | N/A |
"Puff Puppy": Dudley accidentally creates an interdimensional vortex, which makes everything that enters indestructible and "puffy", but on the downside also expand until explosion. When Snaptrap and Bird Brain go through the vortex and become indestructible, Dudley and Kitty must get them back through the vortex. "Stressed to Kill": The Chief is on the brink of a nervous breakdown because of Dudley, who is trying to help him relax. However, Snaptrap and D.O.O.M. disguise themselves as Swedish spa employees to annihilate the Chief.
