= The Greenberry Woods =

American power pop band

The Greenberry Woods is a power pop quartet formed in 1989 by songwriters Matt Huseman and Ira Katz while students at the University of Maryland. They were later joined by Huseman's twin brother Brandt Huseman on bass and drummer Miles Rosen. Named for a suburban Maryland housing development, the band released only two albums before disbanding in 1996. They reunited in 2018 and released an album, House, of material recorded between 1989 and 1995.

== History ==
Upon graduation, the band moved to Baltimore. They hired manager John Lay, whose previous clients included Squeeze and Robyn Hitchcock. The Greenberry Woods were signed by Seymour Stein to Sire Records in February 1993. Their debut album, Rapple Dapple, was released in 1994, with the single "Trampoline" receiving healthy radio airplay. Supporting tour slots with such acts as Squeeze, Debbie Harry, and the Proclaimers followed.

The Greenberry Woods performed at the 1994 HFStival, at RFK Stadium, Washington, DC.

When Sire merged with Elektra Records, the label's support for the band dwindled and tensions arose over Splitsville, the Husemans’ side project with Paul Krysiak. The individual ambitions of three songwriters took its toll on group harmony during the recording of their second album Big Money Item, and Sire released the band from its contract in 1996.

== Discography ==
- Rapple Dapple, 1994, Sire/Reprise
- Big Money Item, 1995, Sire
- House, 2018
- It's All Good, Sugar, 2026, Big Stir

== Music videos ==
- "Trampoline," 1994
- "Adieu," 1994
- "Whenever You Want Me Too", 2026
- "The One That Makes You Happy", 2026

== See also ==
- List of HFStival acts
