= Sire Records =

American record label

- Parent company: Warner Music Group
- Founded: 1966; 60 years ago
- Founder: Seymour Stein; Richard Gottehrer
- Distributors: Warner Records; (United States); Warner Music Group; (International); Rhino Entertainment Company; (Re-issues)
- Genre: Various
- Country of origin: United States
- Official website: sirerecords.com

Sire Records (formerly Sire Records Company) is an American record label owned by Warner Music Group and distributed by Warner Records.

== History ==
=== Beginnings ===
The label was founded in 1966 as Sire Productions by Seymour Stein and Richard Gottehrer, each investing ten thousand dollars into the new company. Its early releases, in 1968, were distributed in the US by London Records. From the beginning, Sire introduced underground, progressive British bands to the American market. Early releases included the Climax Blues Band, Barclay James Harvest, Tomorrow, Matthews Southern Comfort and proto-punks the Deviants.

When distribution by London ended after two years, US distribution was handled by various companies: Polydor Records in 1970 and 1971, during which time Sire's famous logo was introduced; by Famous Music from 1972 to 1974, during which time the progressive rock band Focus charted with their 1972 hit "Hocus Pocus"; and by ABC Records, which inherited Sire's distribution deal when it acquired Famous Music. Sire was distributed by Phonogram Inc. in Europe from 1974 to 1977.

In the 70s, Sire released a number of compilation albums, including the 3 volume "History Of British Rock" series, and acts such as the Flamin Groovies, Renaissance, the Turtles, Duane Eddy, the Small Faces, and Del Shannon. Sire had one of its biggest successes when Climax Blues Band reached number 3 on the US Billboard Hot 100 chart in 1977 with "Couldn't Get It Right". Also in 1977, Stein, who had previously worked with the Shangri-Las in the 1960s, convinced the group to reform and return to the studio. But the trio working together again proved to be short-lived and they asked to be let out of their contract; the new songs they had recorded were not released by the label.

=== Acquisition by Warner ===
In the mid-1970s, Sire transformed itself into a successful independent record label and went on to sign artists from the burgeoning punk rock and new wave scenes, including the Ramones, the Dead Boys, the Undertones, and Talking Heads. Sire returned to major label distribution in 1977 with a new deal with Warner Bros. Records. The following year Warner Bros. and Sire entered negotiations whereby Warner Bros. would purchase Sire Records outright, making Sire one of Warner Bros. subsidiary labels. Over the next several years, Sire saw success in the US and Canada with acts such as the Pretenders, Madonna (their biggest act), Soft Cell, the Cure, Depeche Mode, the Smiths, Martini Ranch and Echo & the Bunnymen. During the late 1980s and early 1990s, the label had continued success with a roster that included Ministry, k.d. lang, Ice-T, Seal, and Tommy Page.

In 1994, Sire switched distribution from Warner Bros. Records to sister label Elektra Records, also part of parent company Warner Music Group (WMG). Stein had been appointed president of Elektra Records under Elektra's newly appointed CEO Sylvia Rhone, so Stein would also be overseeing distribution of Sire releases by Elektra as well as running Elektra day-to-day. Sire left Elektra distribution in 1997 as it became a stand-alone label. But in 2000, Sire and the US division of London Records were merged to become one label, London-Sire Records. This partnership, however, was dissolved in April 2003, at which point the company went back to being called Sire Records, and it returned to distribution with Warner Bros. Records once again.

In 1998, Sire signed a deal with the band the Tragically Hip to distribute their music outside of Canada.

In 2009, official music videos displayed on the Sire Records website were taken down because of a copyright claim by parent Warner Music Group, after royalty negotiations between WMG and YouTube (which Sire had been using to host the videos) broke down in December 2008. In September 2009, both parties came to terms, with Warner Music restoring its music onto YouTube.

In July 2017, Rani Hancock was named the new president of Sire Records. Label co-founder Seymour Stein remained on as chairman. Hancock had previously been the executive vice president and head of A&R at Island Records. In July 2018, Stein departed from Sire Records after a total of 51 years involved at Sire or its parent WMG.

== See also ==
- List of Sire Records artists
- List of record labels
