= Duiker (disambiguation) =

A duiker /ˈdaɪkər/ is a small to medium-sized brown antelope native to sub-Saharan Africa.

Duiker may also refer to:

- Duiker (surname), a Dutch and Afrikaans surname
- Duiker Island, an island off Hout Bay near Cape Town South Africa
