= Dutch art =

The Night Watch by Rembrandt, 1642, Rijksmuseum, Amsterdam

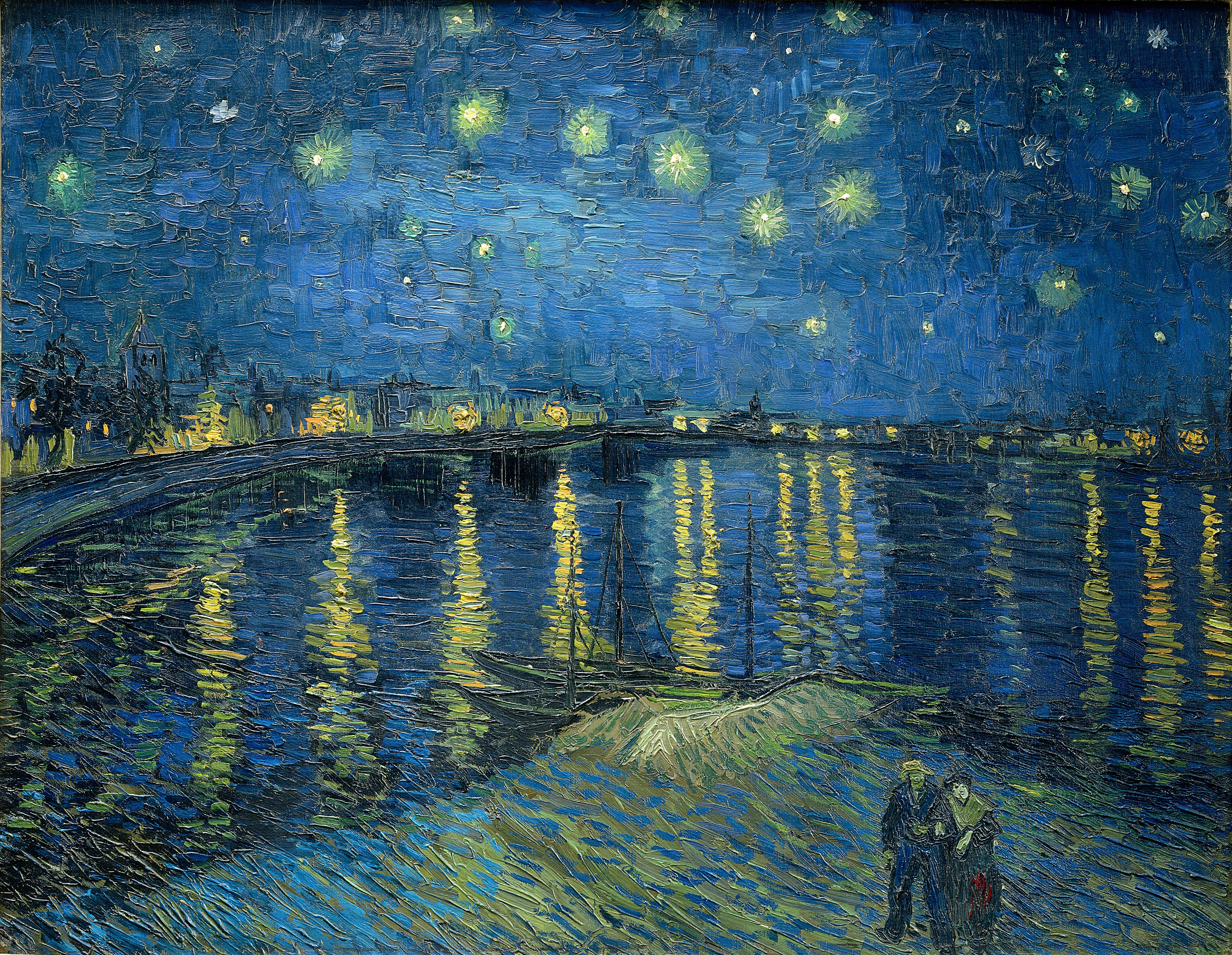
Starry Night Over the Rhône by Vincent van Gogh, 1888, Musée d'Orsay, Paris

Dutch art describes the history of visual arts in the Netherlands, after the United Provinces separated from Flanders. Earlier painting in the area is covered in Early Netherlandish painting and Dutch and Flemish Renaissance painting.

Dutch Golden Age painting, spanning from about 1620 to 1680, was a distinct style and movement that evolved out of the Flemish Baroque tradition. It was a period of great artistic achievement in the Netherlands. There was a healthy artistic climate in Dutch cities during the seventeenth century. For example, between 1605 and 1635, over 100,000 paintings were produced in Haarlem. At that time, art ownership in the city was 25%, a record high. After the end of the Golden Age, production of paintings remained high, but ceased to influence the rest of Europe as strongly.

Many painters, sculptors and architects of the seventeenth century are called "Dutch masters", while earlier artists are generally referred to as part of the "Netherlandish" tradition. When a work of art is labelled as 'Dutch School', it means that the specific artist who created it is unknown.

The Hague School of the 19th century re-interpreted the range of subjects of the Golden Age in contemporary terms, and made Dutch painting once again a European leader. In the successive movements of art since the 19th century, the Dutch contribution has been best known from the work of the individual figures of Vincent van Gogh and Piet Mondrian, though both did their best work outside the Netherlands, and took some time to be appreciated. Amsterdam Impressionism had a mainly local impact, but the De Stijl movement, of which Mondrian was a member, was influential abroad.

== Golden Age ==
Girl with a Pearl Earring by Johannes Vermeer is often considered to be the best known piece of Dutch art.

Dutch Golden Age painting was among the most acclaimed in the world at the time, during the seventeenth century. During the Dutch Golden Age, there was such a high output of paintings that prices for artwork declined. From the 1620s, Dutch painting broke decisively from the Baroque style typified by Rubens in neighboring Flanders into a more realistic style of depiction, very much concerned with the real world. Types of paintings included historical paintings, portraiture, landscapes and cityscapes, still lifes and genre paintings. In the last four of these categories, Dutch painters established styles upon which art in Europe depended for the next two centuries. Paintings often had a moralistic subtext. The Golden Age never really recovered from the French invasion of 1672, although there was a twilight period lasting until about 1710.

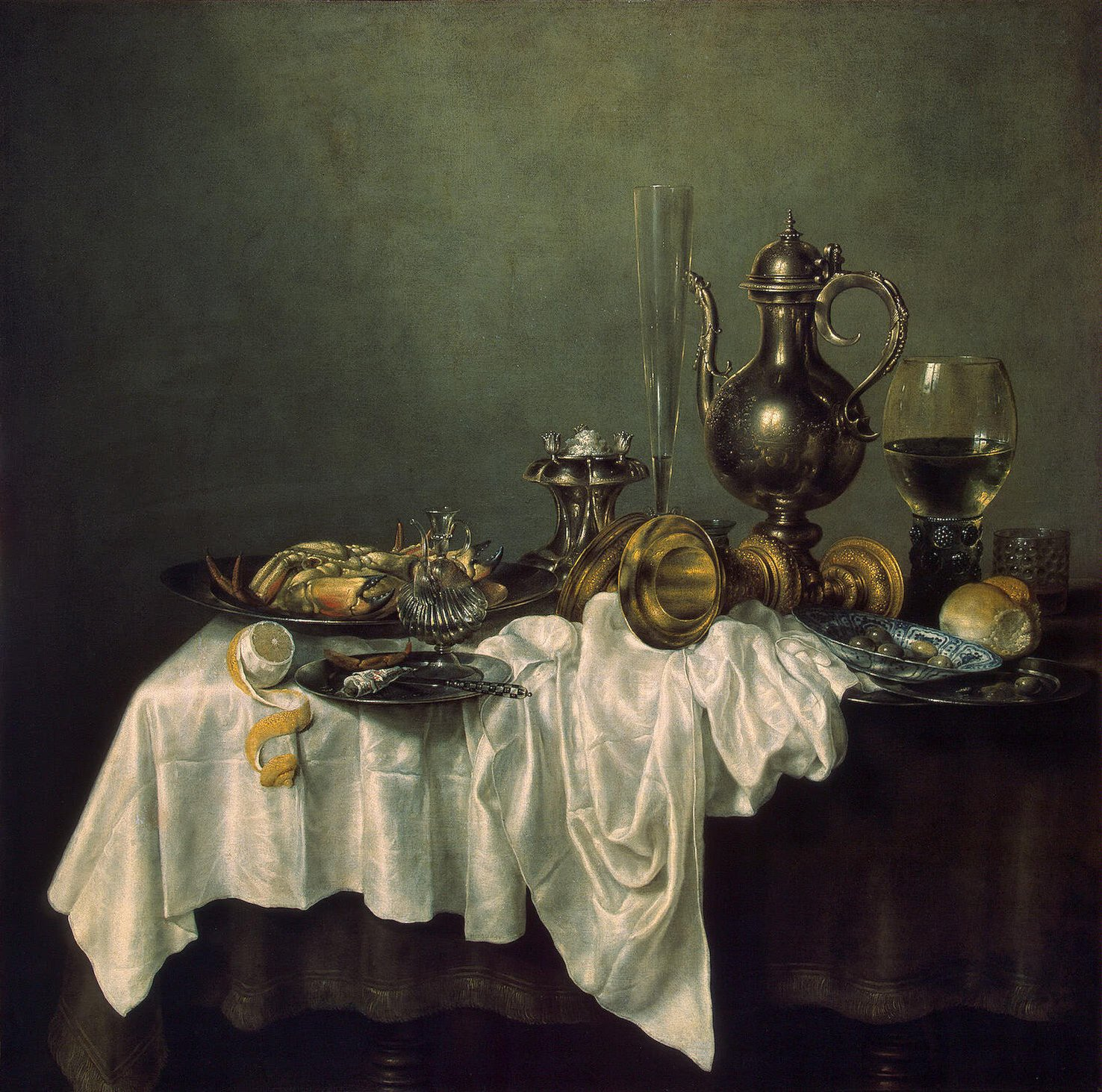
Willem Claeszoon Heda (17th century): Breakfast with a Crab

Dutch painters, especially in the northern provinces, tried to evoke emotions in the spectator by letting the person be a bystander to a scene of profound intimacy. Portrait painting thrived in the Netherlands in the seventeenth century. Many portraits were commissioned by wealthy individuals. Group portraits similarly were often ordered by prominent members of a city's civilian guard, by boards of trustees and regents, and the likes. Often, group portraits were paid for by each portrayed person individually. The amount paid determined each person's place in the picture, either head to toe in full regalia in the foreground or face only in the back of the group. Sometimes, all group members paid an equal sum, which was likely to lead to quarrels when some members gained a more prominent place in the picture than others. Allegories, in which painted objects conveyed symbolic meaning about the subject, were often applied. Dutch genre paintings often included hidden meanings or messages that were understood by viewers at the time, but may not be easily understood by modern viewers. Favourite topics in Dutch landscapes were the dunes along the western sea coast, rivers with their broad adjoining meadows where cattle grazed, often a silhouette of a city in the distance.

Rembrandt's reputation as a portrait artist had grown by 1631, and he began receiving several portrait commissions in Amsterdam. Around 1640, Rembrandt's work became more somber and reflective, perhaps influenced by personal tragedy and loss. Biblical scenes were now derived more often from the New Testament instead of the Old Testament. One of his most famous paintings is The Night Watch, which was completed in 1642, at the peak of Holland's golden age. The painting was commissioned to be hung in the banquet hall of the newly built Kloveniersdoelen (Musketeers' Meeting Hall) in Amsterdam.

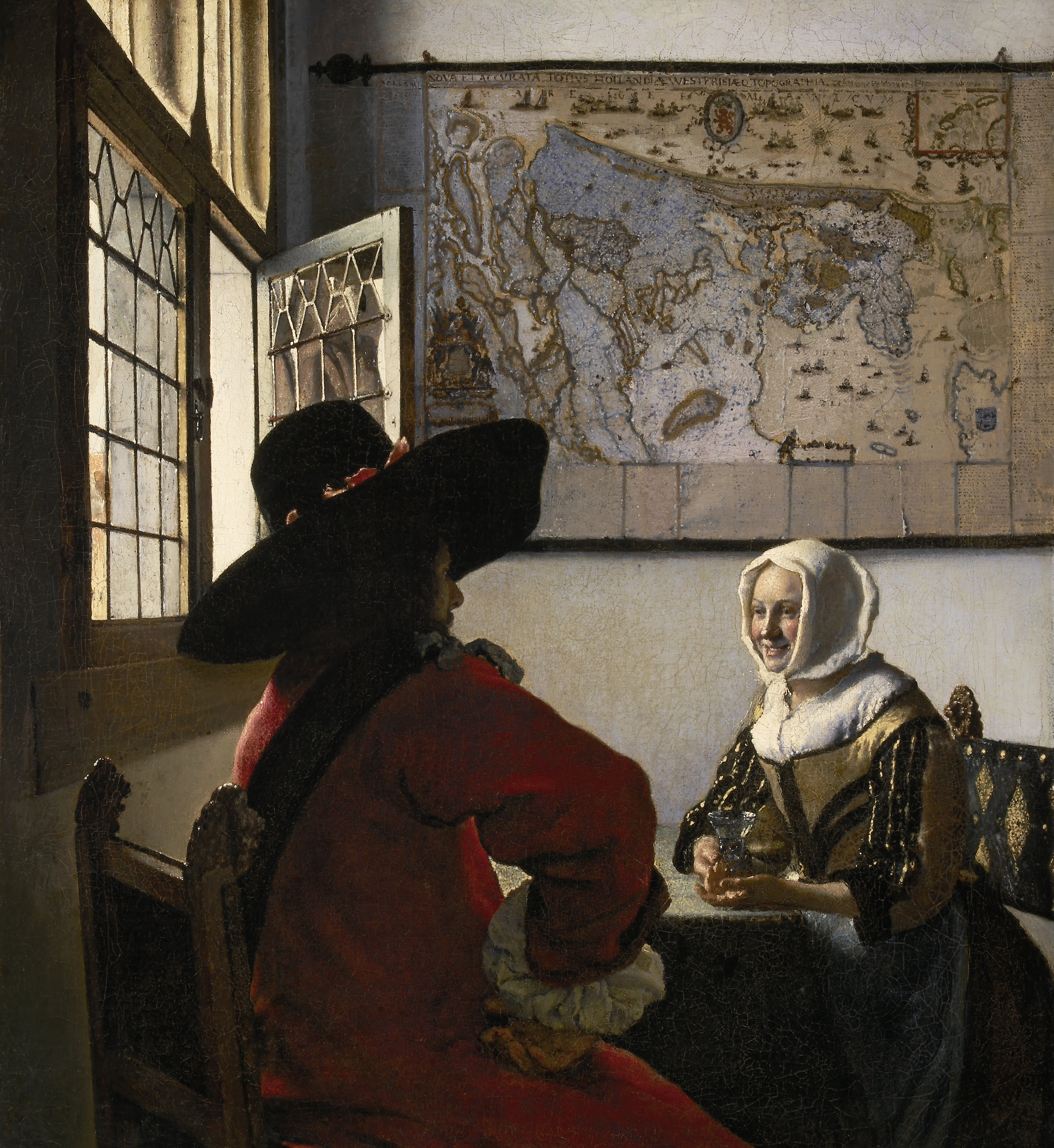
Vermeer's Officer and a Laughing Girl circa 1657,The Frick Collection, New York

Johannes Vermeer's works are admired for their transparent colors, careful composition, and brilliant use of light. Vermeer painted mostly domestic interior scenes, and even his two known landscapes are framed with a window. The interior scenes are usually genre pieces or portraits.

The Utrecht School is a term used to describe a group of painters working in the city of Utrecht in the 17th century. Their work is considered part of the Baroque period of art history. The Utrecht School painters were influenced by the work of Caravaggio, who had died shortly before their careers began. The Bamboccianti were a group of Dutch genre painters active in Rome from 1625 to 1700, during high and late Baroque. Their works were typically small parlor paintings or etchings of everyday life, including peasants in picturesque scenes.

== Nineteenth century ==
=== Hague School ===
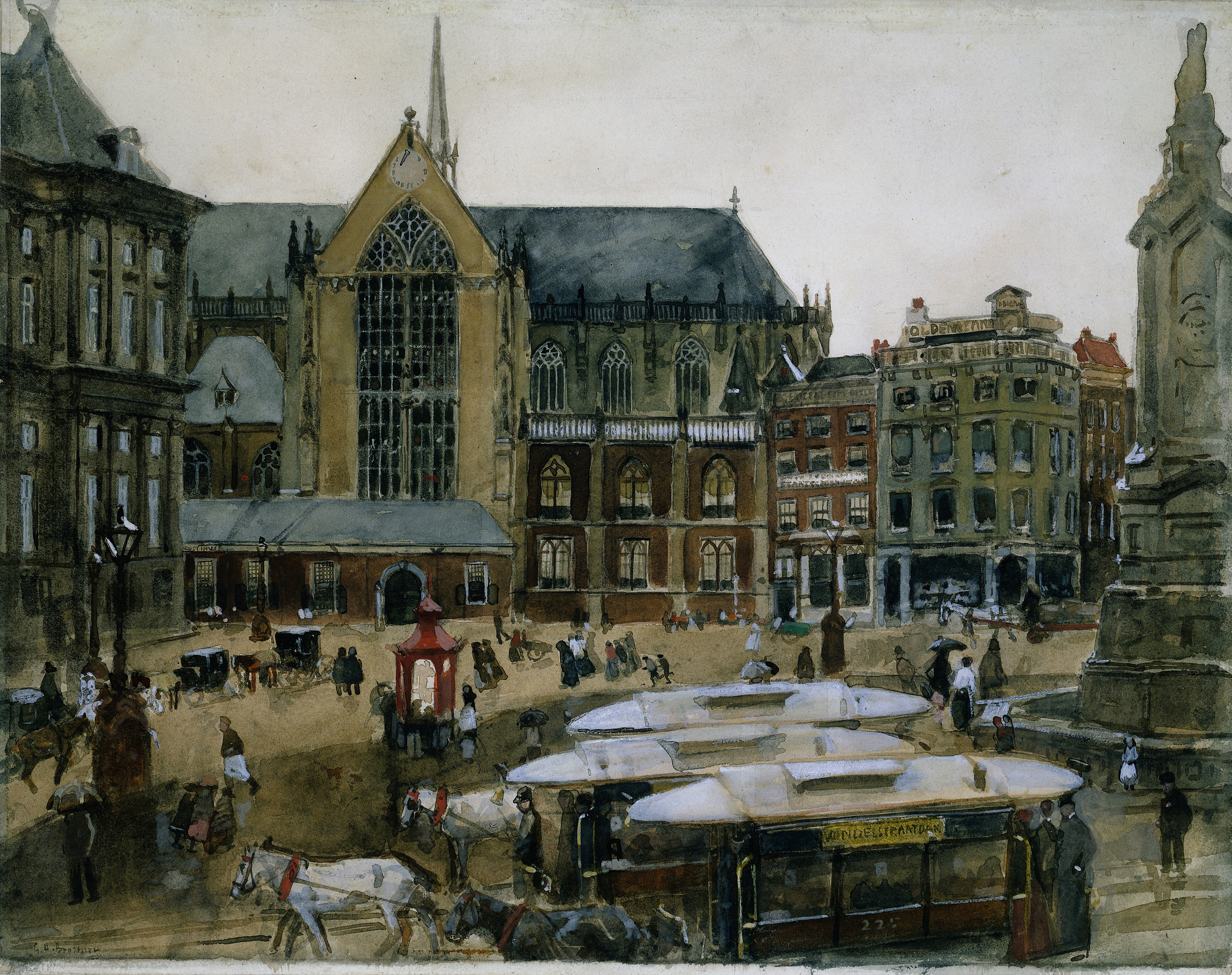
The Dam, Amsterdam (circa 1895) by George Hendrik Breitner

By the 19th century, the Netherlands were far behind the up-to-date art tendencies and schools. Possibly the best known Dutch painter in the first half of the 19th century, Johan Barthold Jongkind, after getting an art education in the country, moved over to France and spend most of his life in Paris.

At the same time, Dutch art responded to the realistic tendencies which were developing in France about the same time. The Hague School were around at the start of the nineteenth century. They included Jozef Israëls, Jacob Maris, Anton Mauve captured the many contrasting aspects of the Dutch landscape, from its deepest shadows to its brightest highlights, and from its hazy atmosphere to its clear, crisp air. "No painter," says M. Philippe Zilcken, "has so well expressed the ethereal effects, bathed in air and light through floating silvery mist, in which painters delight, and the characteristic remote horizons blurred by haze; or again, the grey yet luminous weather of Holland."

Amsterdam Impressionism was current during the middle of the nineteenth century at about the same time as French Impressionism. The painters put their impressions onto canvas with rapid, visible strokes of the brush. They focused on depicting the everyday life of the city. Late nineteenth-century Amsterdam was a bustling centre of art and literature. Famous painters among the Amsterdam Impressionists include George Hendrik Breitner, Willem de Zwart, Isaac Israëls, Simon Duiker and Jan Toorop. George Hendrik Breitner introduced a realism to the Netherlands that created shock waves similar to that of Courbet and Manet's in France. He was the painter of city views par excellence: wooden foundation piles by the harbour, demolition work and construction sites in the old centre, horse trams on the Dam, or canals in the rain. By the turn of the century, Breitner was a famous painter in the Netherlands, as demonstrated by a highly successful retrospective exhibition at Arti et Amicitiae in Amsterdam (1901). When the streets of Amsterdam are grey and rainy, people of Amsterdam whisper grimly "Echt Breitnerweer" (Typical Breitnerweather).

=== Vincent van Gogh ===
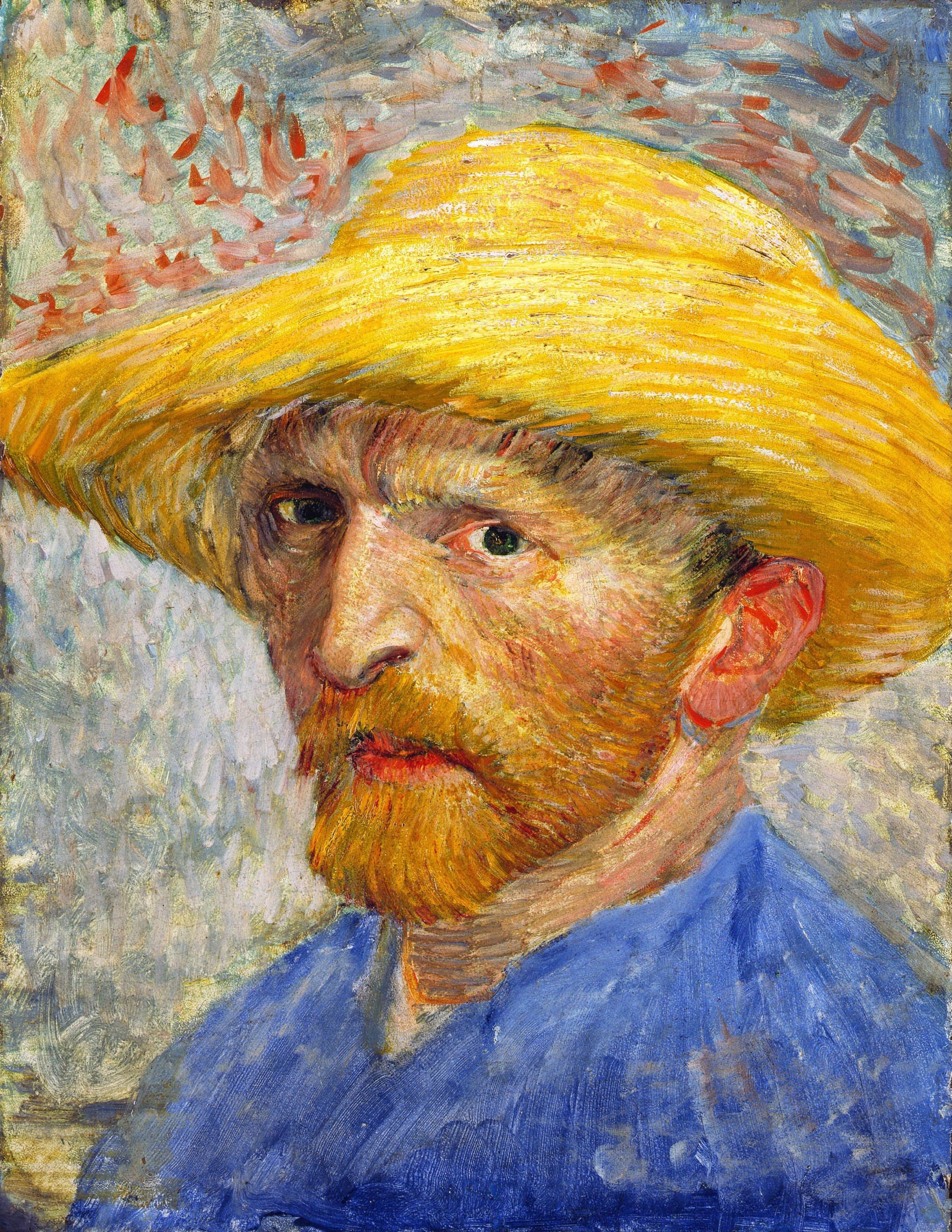
Self-Portrait with Straw Hat by Vincent van Gogh, summer 1887

Vincent van Gogh (30 March 1853 – 29 July 1890) was a post-Impressionist painter whose work, notable for its rough beauty, emotional honesty and bold color, had a far-reaching influence on 20th-century art. After years of painful anxiety and frequent bouts of mental illness, he died aged 37 from a gunshot wound, generally accepted to be self-inflicted (although no gun was ever found). His work was then known to only a handful of people and appreciated by fewer still.

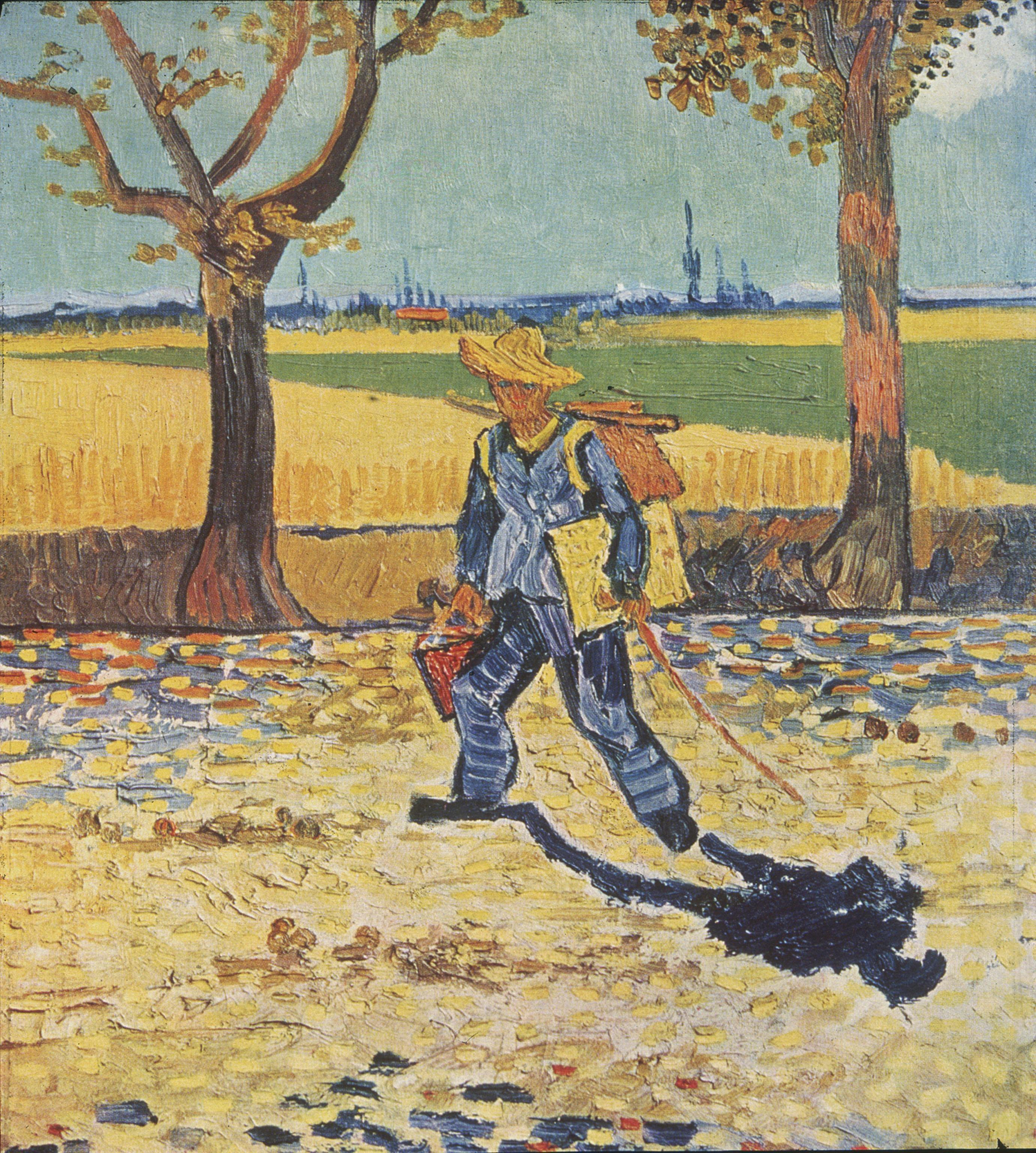
Painter on the Road to Tarascon, August 1888, believed to have been destroyed by fire during the Second World War

Following his first exhibitions in the late 1880s, van Gogh's fame grew steadily among colleagues, art critics, dealers and collectors. After his death, memorial exhibitions were mounted in Brussels, Paris, The Hague and Antwerp. In the early 20th century, there were retrospectives in Paris (1901 and 1905) and Amsterdam (Stedelijk Museum, 1905), and important group exhibitions in Cologne (Sonderbund westdeutscher Kunstfreunde und Künstler, 1912), New York (Armory Show, 1913) and Berlin (1914). These had a noticeable impact on later generations of artists. By the mid-20th century, van Gogh was seen as one of the greatest and most recognizable painters in history. In 2007, a group of Dutch historians compiled the "Canon of the Netherlands" to be taught in schools and included van Gogh as one of the fifty topics of the canon, alongside other national icons such as Rembrandt and De Stijl.

Together with those of Pablo Picasso, Van Gogh's works are among the world's most expensive paintings ever sold, as estimated from auctions and private sales. Those sold for over $100 million (today's equivalent) include Portrait of Dr. Gachet, Portrait of Joseph Roulin and Irises. A Wheatfield with Cypresses was sold in 1993 for $57 million, a spectacularly high price at the time, while his Self-Portrait with Bandaged Ear was sold privately in the late 1990s for an estimated $80 to $90 million.

== Twentieth century ==
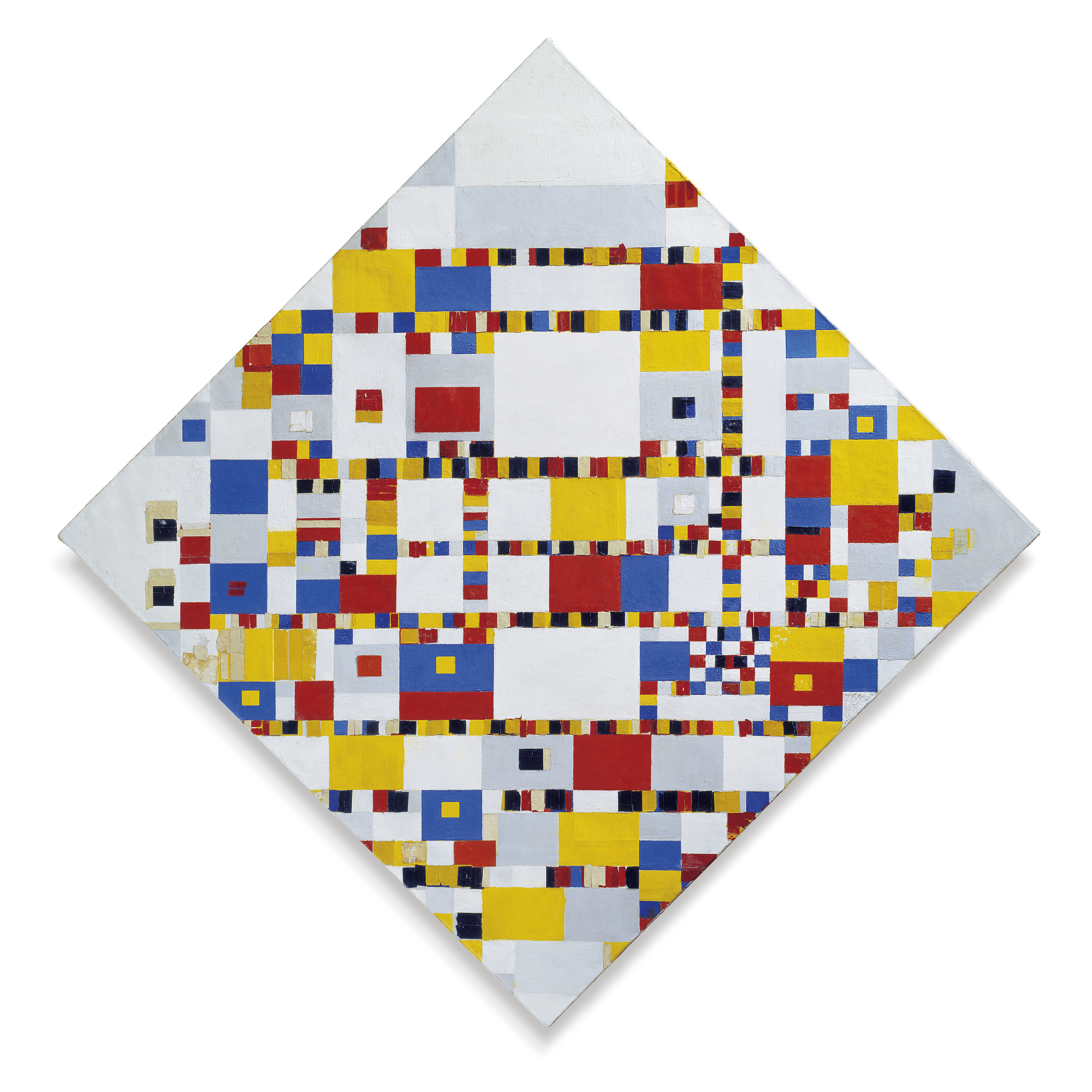
Piet Mondrian's Victory Boogie Woogie

Around 1905 and 1910, pointillism as practiced by Jan Sluyters, Piet Mondrian and Leo Gestel was flourishing. Between 1911 and 1914, all the latest art movements arrived in the Netherlands one after another including cubism, futurism and expressionism, with notable artists of this era including M. C. Escher. After World War I, De Stijl (the style) was led by Theo van Doesburg and Piet Mondrian and promoted a pure art, consisting only of vertical and horizontal lines, and the use of primary colours. The Design Academy was established in 1947.

Abstract art became famous in the Netherlands after the Second World War because of the memorable works of painters like Karel Appel and groups he was a part of such as COBRA.

== Museums ==
Most museums with collections of older paintings have many Dutch paintings, especially from the early and Golden Age periods, often more than they can display. Outstanding collections include:

- Alte Pinakothek in Munich
- Museum of Fine Arts in Boston
- Carnegie Museum of Art in Pittsburgh
- Gemäldegalerie in Berlin
- Frans Hals Museum
- Hermitage in Saint Petersburg, Russia
- Kunsthistorisches Museum in Vienna
- Louvre in Paris
- Mauritshuis in The Hague
- Metropolitan Museum of Art in New York City
- National Gallery in London
- National Gallery, Washington D.C.
- Rijksmuseum Amsterdam
