= The Art of Painting =

Painting by Johannes Vermeer

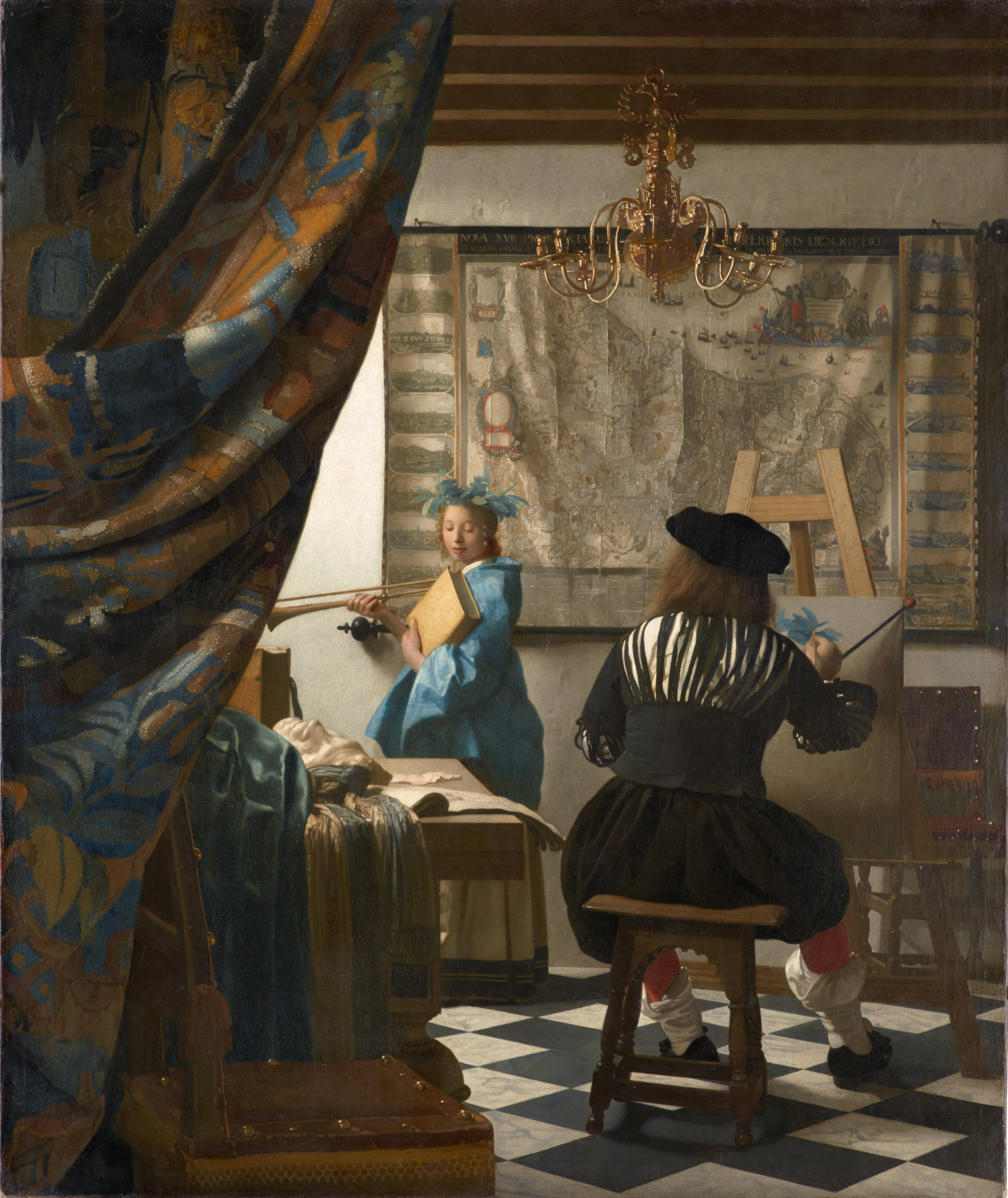
- Artist: Johannes Vermeer
- Year: c. 1666–1668
- Medium: Oil on canvas
- Movement: Baroque painting, Dutch Golden Age painting
- Dimensions: 120 cm × 100 cm (47 in × 39 in)
- Location: Kunsthistorisches Museum, Vienna

The Art of Painting, also known as The Allegory of Painting (Dutch: Allegorie op de schilderkunst), or Painter in his Studio, is a 17th-century oil on canvas painting by Dutch painter Johannes Vermeer. It is owned by the Austrian Republic and is on display in the Kunsthistorisches Museum in Vienna.

Many art historians think that it is an allegory of painting, hence the alternative title of the painting. Its composition and iconography make it Vermeer's most complex work. After Vermeer's Christ in the House of Martha and Mary and The Procuress, it is his largest work.

This illusionistic painting is one of Vermeer's most famous. In 1868 Théophile Thoré-Bürger, known today for his rediscovery of Vermeer, regarded this painting as his most interesting. Svetlana Alpers describes it as unique and ambitious; Walter Liedtke as "a virtuoso display of the artist's power of invention and execution, staged in an imaginary version of his studio...." According to Albert Blankert, "No other painting so flawlessly integrates naturalistic technique, brightly illuminated space, and a complexly integrated composition."

== Description ==
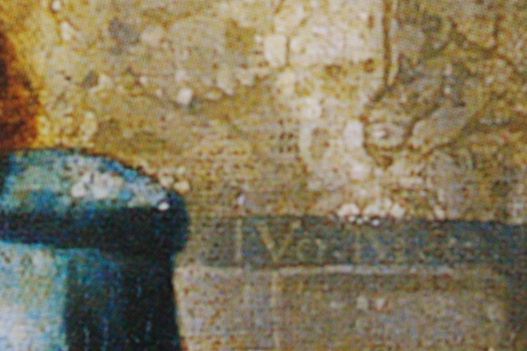
His signature

This canvas depicts an artist painting a woman dressed in blue posing as a model in his studio. The subject is standing by a window and a large map of the Low Countries hangs on the wall behind. It is signed to the right of the girl "I [Oannes] Ver. Meer", but not dated. Most experts assume it was executed sometime between 1665/1668, but some suggest the work could have been created as late as 1670–1675.

In 1663 Vermeer had been visited by Balthasar de Monconys, but had no painting to show, so it was possibly done "in order to have an outstanding specimen of his art in his studio." Vermeer obviously liked the painting; he never sold it during his lifetime. According to Alpers "it stands as a kind of summary and assessment of what has been done."

=== Elements ===
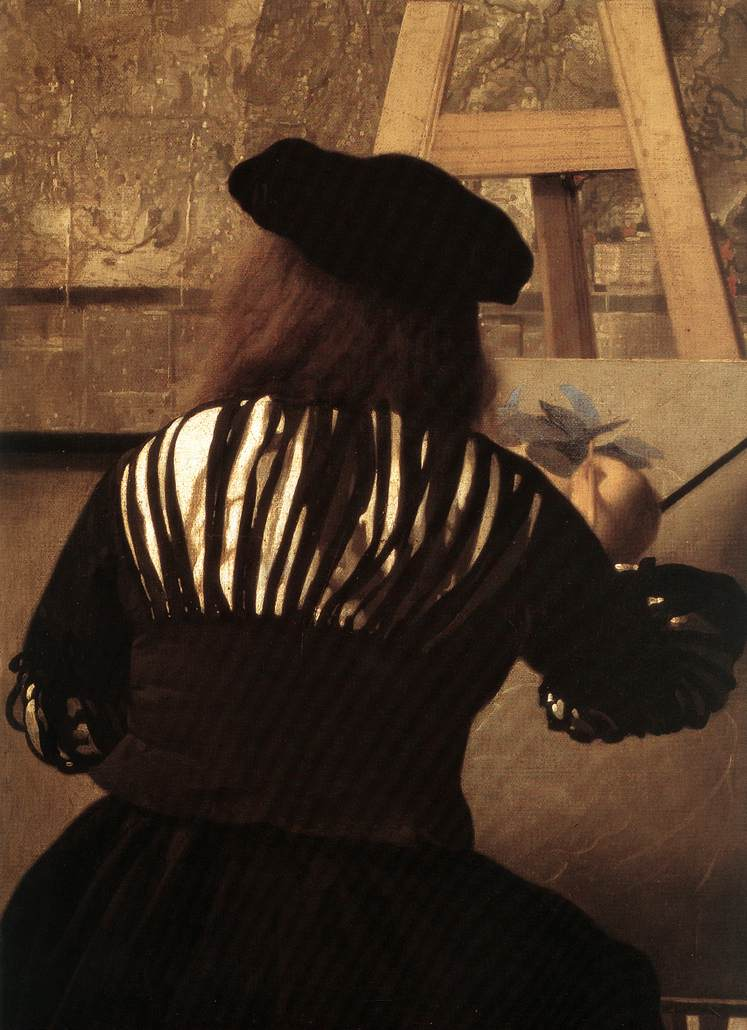
Detail of Vermeer's Art of Painting showing the painter at his easel using a maulstick.

The painting has only two figures, the painter and his subject, a woman with downcast eyes. The painter was thought to be a self-portrait of the artist; Jean-Louis Vaudoyer suggested the young woman could be his daughter. The painter sits in front of the painting on the easel, where you can see the sketch of the crown. He is dressed in an elegant black garment with cuts on the sleeves and on the back that offers a glimpse of the shirt underneath. He has short puffy breeches and orange stockings, an expensive and fashionable garment that is also found in other works of the time, as in a well-known self-portrait by Rubens.

The tapestry and the chair, both repoussoirs, lead the viewer into the painting. As in The Allegory of Faith, the ceiling can be seen.

Experts attribute symbols to various aspects of the painting. A number of the items, a plaster mask, perhaps representing the debate on paragone, the presence of a piece of cloth, a folio, and some leather on the table have been linked to the symbols of Liberal Arts. The representation of the marble tiled floor and the splendid golden chandelier are examples of Vermeer's craftsmanship and show his knowledge of perspective. Each object reflects or absorbs light differently, getting the most accurate rendering of material effects.

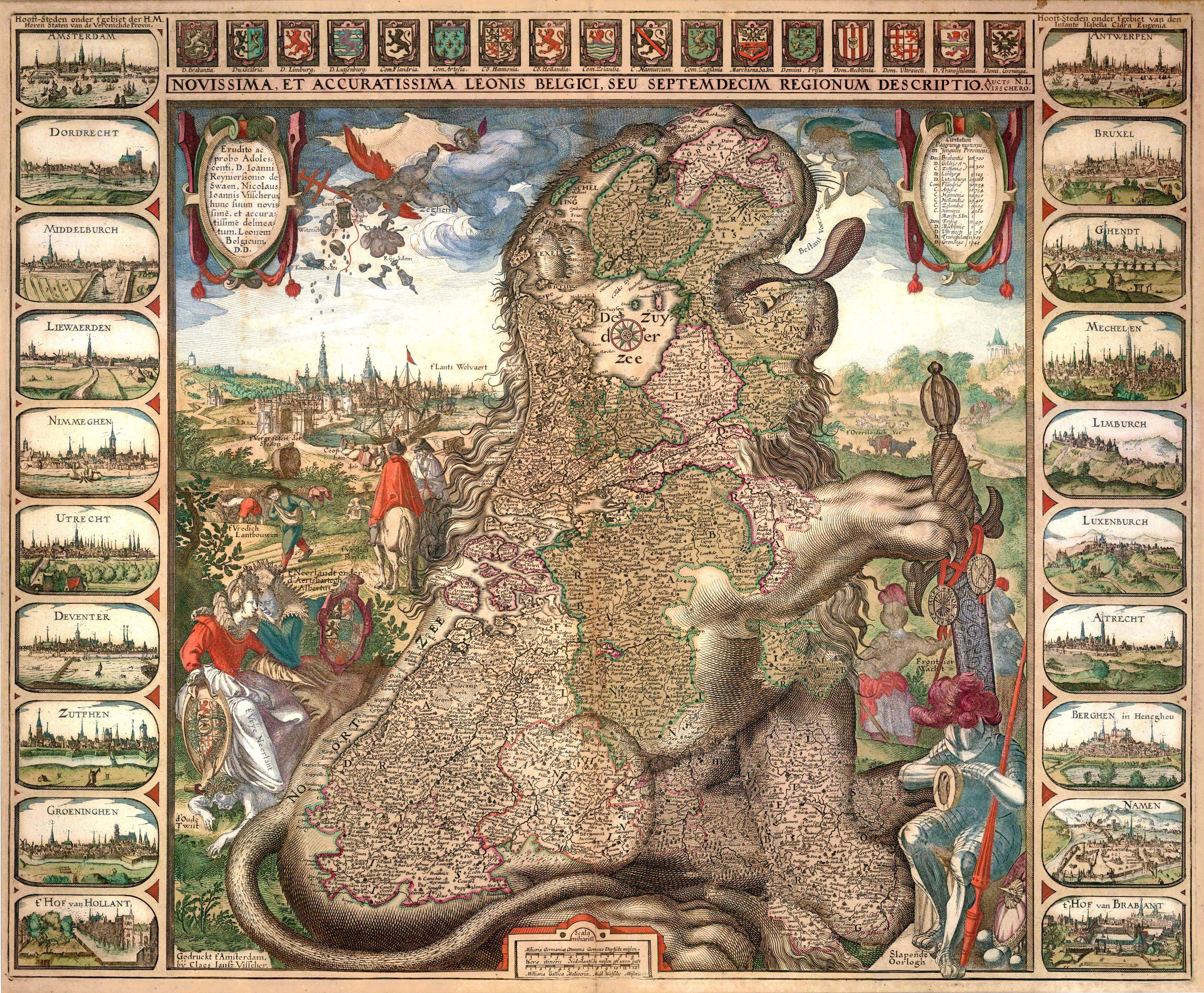
Leo Belgicus by Visscher (1611)

The map, remarkable for the representation of light on it, shows the Seventeen Provinces of the Netherlands, flanked by 20 views of prominent Dutch cities. It was published by Claes Janszoon Visscher in 1636. This map, but without the city views on the left and right can be seen on paintings by Jacob Ochtervelt and Nicolaes Maes. Similar maps were found in the Bibliothèque Nationale in Paris and in the Swedish Skokloster. In the top left of the map two women can be seen; one bearing a cross-staff and compasses, while the other has a palette, brush, and a city view in the hand.

=== Symbolism and allegory ===
Vermeer had a theoretical interest for painting. The subject is presumed to be Fama, Pictura, or Clio, the Muse of History, evidenced by her wearing a laurel wreath, holding a trumpet, possibly carrying a book by Herodotus or Thucydides, which matches the description in Cesare Ripa's 16th century book on emblems and personifications entitled Iconologia. However, according to Ripa History should look back and not down as in this painting. Following Vermeer's contemporary Gerard de Lairesse, interested in French Classicism and Ripa, there is another explanation; he mentions history and poetry as the main resources of a painter. The woman in blue could be representing poetry, pointing to Plutarch who observed that "Simonides calls painting silent poetry and poetry painting that speaks", later paraphrased by the Latin poet Horace as ut pictura poesis. If so, the map is representing history.

The double-headed eagle, symbol of the Habsburg Holy Roman Empire, which possibly adorns the central golden chandelier, may represent the former rulers of the Low Countries. The large map on the back wall has a prominent crease that divides the Seventeen Provinces into the north and south. (West is at the top of the map.) The crease may symbolize the division between the Dutch Republic to the north and southern provinces under Habsburg rule. The map shows the earlier political division between the Union of Utrecht to the north, and the loyal provinces to the south. This interpretation might have appealed to Hitler who owned the painting during the war. According to Liedtke a political interpretation of the map and the Habsburg eagle is unconvincing; they overlook other motives. The map could suggest though that painting has brought fame to the Netherlands; ships sailing over the folds suggest that.

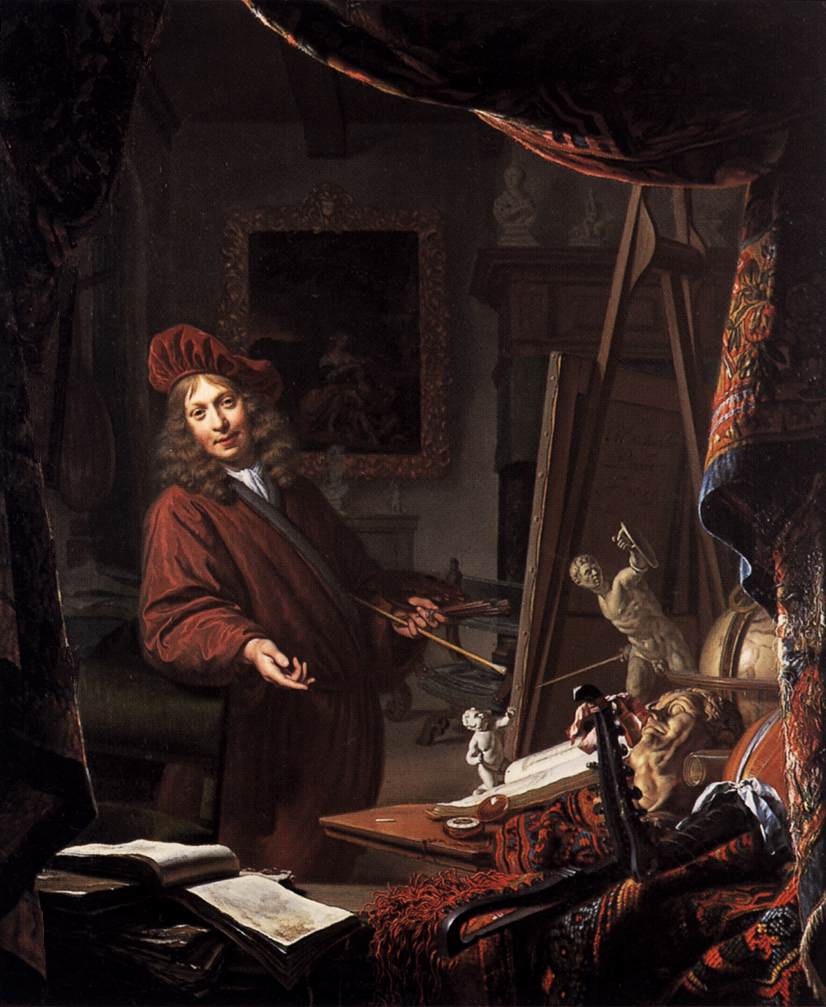
The Painter's Studio by Michiel van Musscher, 1679

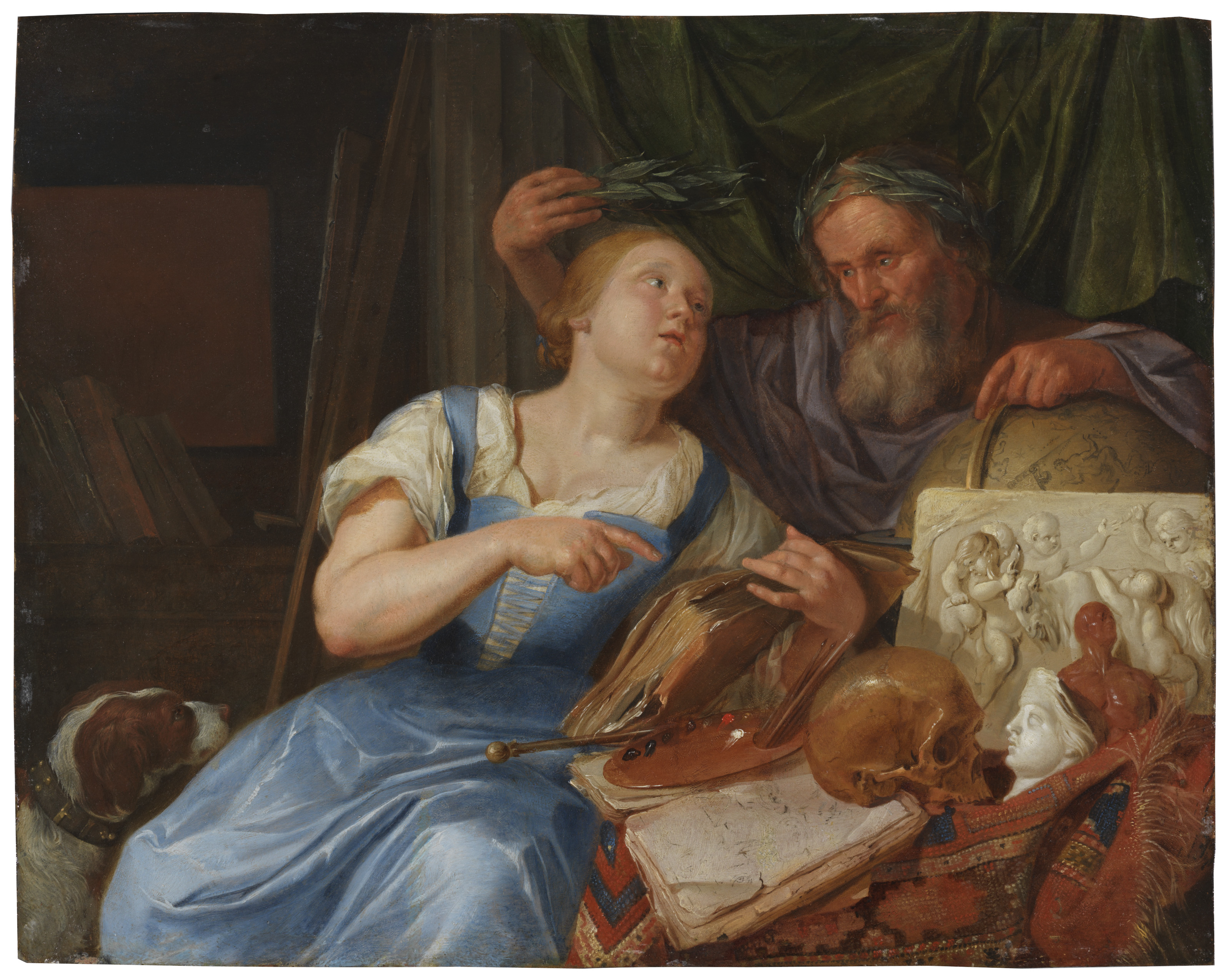
Allegory of Painting by Jacob Toorenvliet; Leiden Collection.

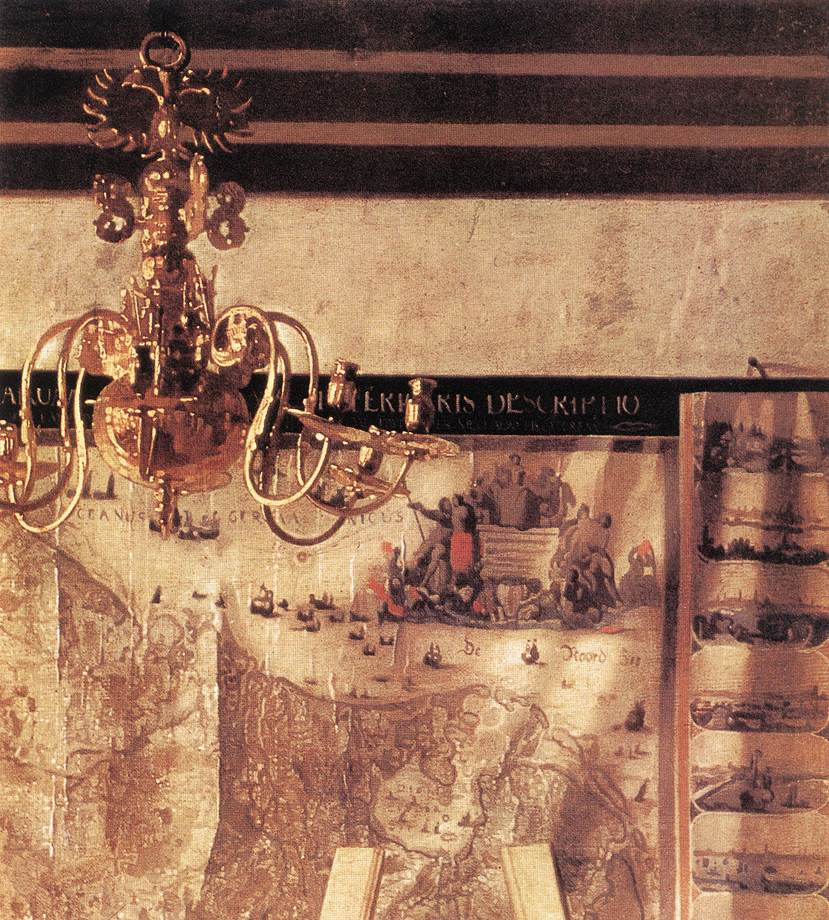
A theorized double eagle on top the chandelier

== Provenance ==
External videos
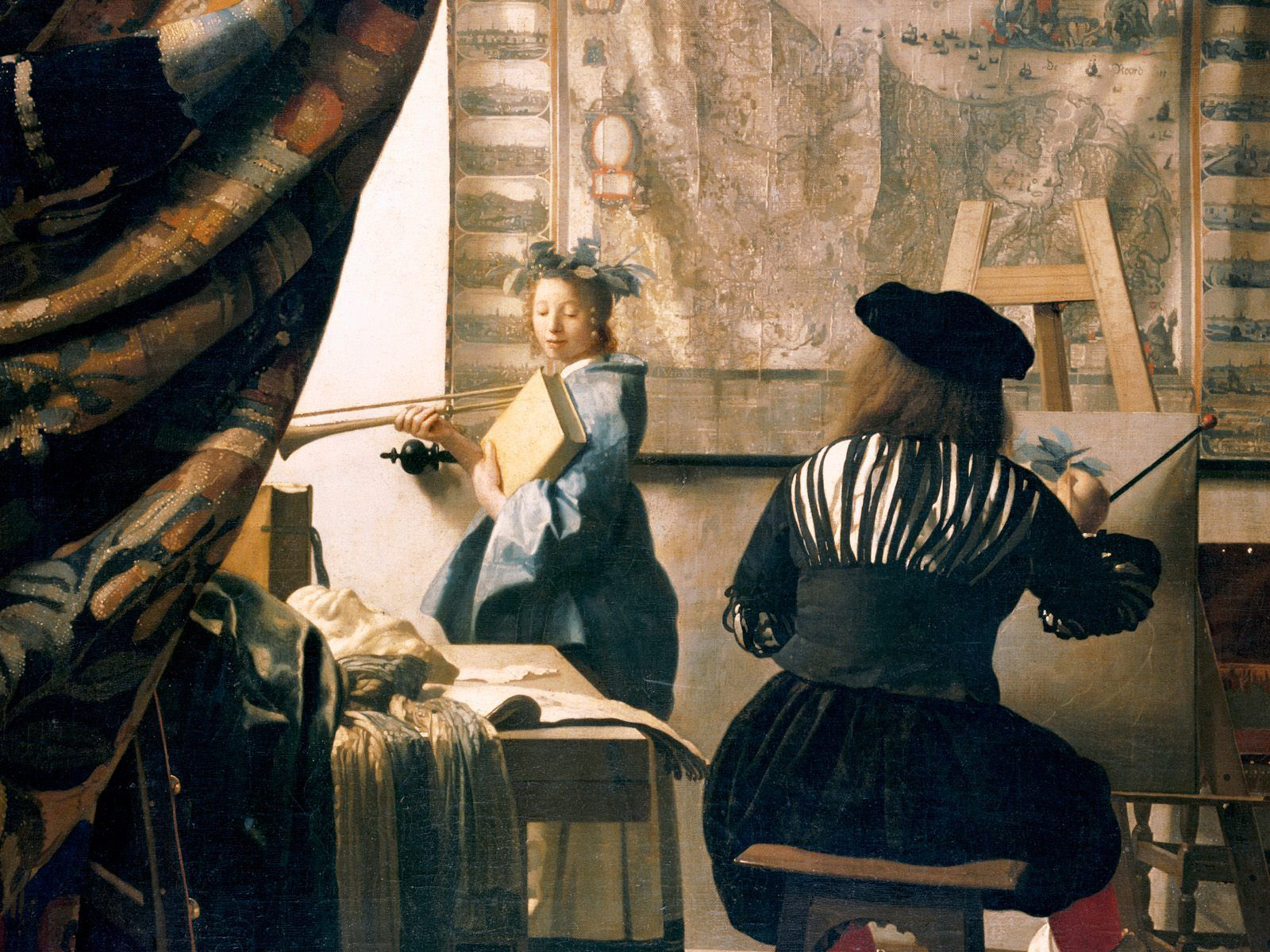
- Johannes Vermeer's The Art of Painting, (4:55), Smarthistory

The painting is considered a work with significance for Vermeer because he did not part with it or sell it, even when he was in debt. On 24 February 1676, his widow Catharina bequeathed it to her mother, Maria Thins, in an attempt to avoid the sale of the painting to satisfy creditors. The executor of Vermeer's estate, the famous Delft microscopist Antonie van Leeuwenhoek, determined that the transferral of the work to the late painter's mother-in-law was illegal and, according to John Michael Montias, at least a curious transaction. On 15 March 1677 most of his paintings were sold in an auction at the Guild in Delft. It is not known who bought The Art of Painting; perhaps it was Jacob Dissius. It can not be determined with certainty whether the painting is quoted in the auction Dissius of 1696 as "Portrait of Vermeer in a room with various accessories." The painting was owned by Gerard van Swieten, and passed into the hands of Gottfried van Swieten. In 1813, it was purchased for 50 florins by the Bohemian-Austrian Count Rudolf Czernin. It was placed on public display in the Czernin Museum in Vienna.

Until 1860, the painting was considered to have been painted by Vermeer's contemporary, Pieter de Hooch; Vermeer was little-known until the late 19th century. Hooch's signature was even forged on the painting. It was at the intervention of the German art historian Gustav Friedrich Waagen that it was recognised as a Vermeer original.

=== Nazi interest ===
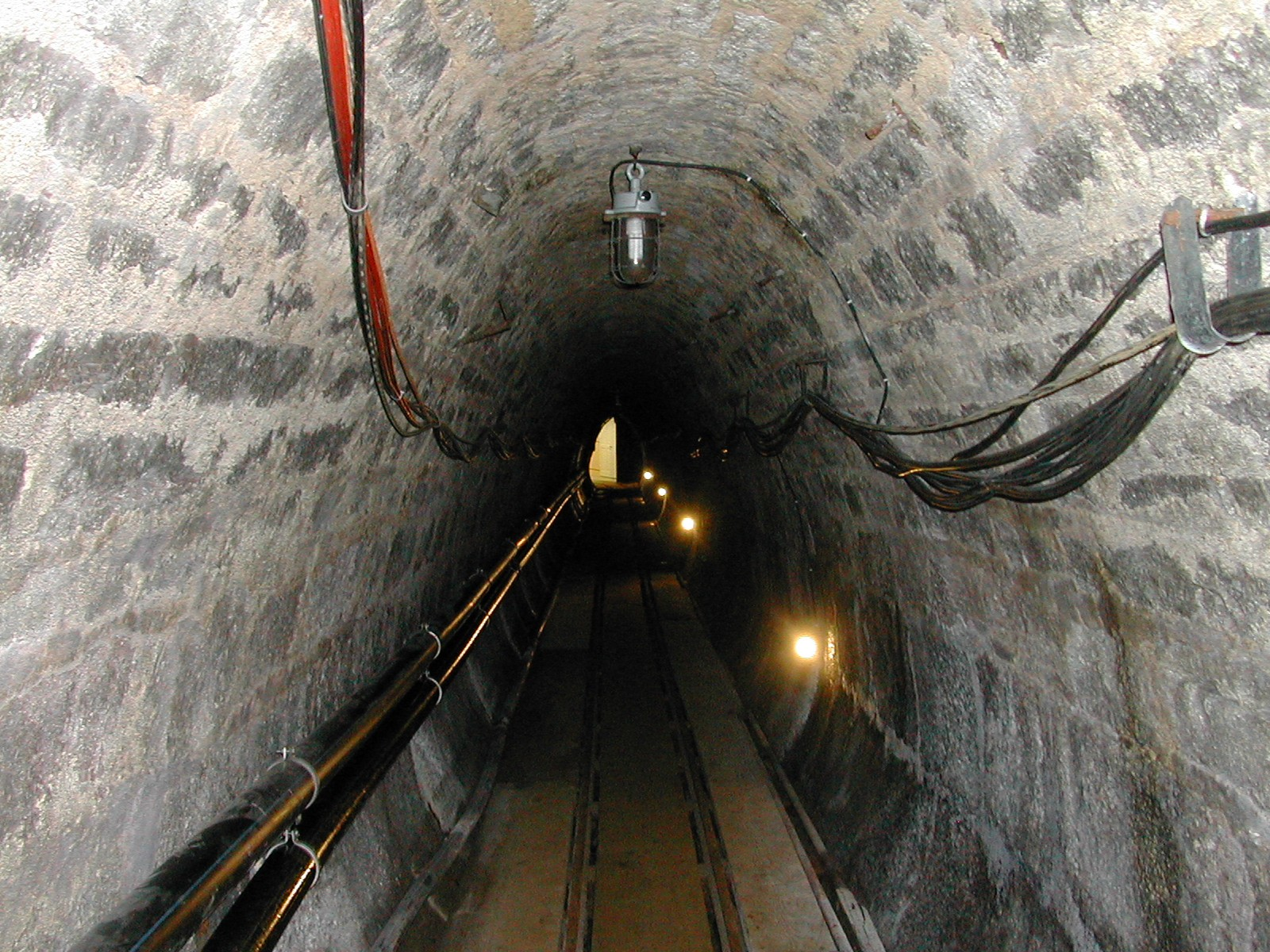
A tunnel in the Altaussee salt mine

In 1935, Count Jaromir Czernin had tried to sell the painting to Andrew W. Mellon, but the Austrian government prohibited the export of the painting. After the annexation of Austria, Philipp Reemtsma with the help of Reichsmarschall Hermann Göring attempted to acquire the painting. The transaction to a private person was refused being cultural heritage. It was finally acquired by Adolf Hitler for the collection of the Linzer Museum at a price of 1.82 million Reichsmark through his agent, Hans Posse on 20 November 1940. The painting was rescued from a salt mine near Altaussee at the end of World War II in 1945, where it was preserved from Allied bombing raids, with other works of art. The painting was escorted to Vienna from Munich by Andrew Ritchie, chief of the Monuments, Fine Arts, and Archives program (MFA&A) for Austria, who transported it by locking himself and the painting in a train compartment.

The Americans presented the painting to the Austrian Government in late 1945 since the Czernin family were deemed to have sold it voluntarily, without undue force from Hitler. The Czernin family made several attempts to claim restitution, each time being rejected, although this played a role in securing an official certification of Hitler's death in 1956. In 1958, Vermeer's The Art of Painting was finally moved from temporary status into the permanent collection of the Kunsthistorisches Museum in Vienna. A 1998 restitution law, which pertains to public institutions, bolstered the family's legal position, but the case was rejected again by the Austrian government in 2011.

== See also ==
- List of paintings by Johannes Vermeer
- * 100 Great Paintings, 1980 BBC series
- Salvador Dalí refers to The Art of Painting in his own surrealistic painting The Ghost of Vermeer of Delft Which Can Be Used as a Table (1934). In Dalí's painting the image of Vermeer from The Art of Painting, although not true to the representation regarding Vermeer's clothes, is viewed from behind, re-created as a strange kind of table.
- In 1968, British artist Malcolm Morley painted an acrylic copy of The Art of Painting in his signature "super-realistic" style, using a gridding technique to scale it up to 105 × 87 inches (266.7 × 220.98 cm) raising questions of appropriation that influenced mid- to late-20th century art discourse.
