= Revolution Summer =

Revolution Summer may refer to:

- Revolution Summer (album), a soundtrack album by Jonathan Richman
- Revolution Summer (music), a punk rock music movement related to the genres of post-hardcore and emo
- "Revolution Summer", a song by Pussy Galore (band)
