= Duiker (surname) =

Duiker (pronounced [ˈdœykər]) is a Dutch and Afrikaans surname which in both languages means "diver".
Notable people with this name include:

- Itumeleng Duiker (born 1972), Botswana former footballer
- Jan Duiker (1890–1935), Dutch architect
- K. Sello Duiker (1974–2005), South African novelist
- Simon Duiker (1874–1941), Dutch painter
- William J. Duiker (born 1932), former United States Foreign Service officer
