= Because Her Beauty Is Raw and Wild =

Studio album by Jonathan Richman
- Released: April 8, 2008
- Genres: Acoustic, pop rock
- Label: Vapor

Jonathan Richman chronology
Revolution Summer (2007)	Because Her Beauty Is Raw and Wild (2008)	¿A Qué Venimos Sino a Caer? (2010)

Professional ratings
Review scores
Source	Rating
AllMusic	4/5 stars
Pitchfork	6.7/10

Because Her Beauty Is Raw and Wild is an album by Jonathan Richman. Released in 2008 on Vapor Records on the heels of Richman’s instrumental soundtrack album for the 2007 film Revolution Summer, Because Her Beauty Is Raw and Wild is Richman's first song-oriented LP since 2004's Not So Much to Be Loved as to Love. Early pressings came with the bonus 7-inch single, "You Can Have A Cell Phone That's OK But Not Me" (Vapor 7-482364).

== Track listing ==
All tracks composed by Jonathan Richman; except where indicated

1. "Because Her Beauty Is Raw and Wild" – 2:29
2. "No One Was Like Vermeer" – 3:00
3. "Time Has Been Going By So Fast" – 2:45
4. "Es Como El Pan" – 2:59
5. "Our Drab Ways" – 3:19
6. "The Lovers Are Here and They're Full of Sweat" – 2:59
7. "Le Printemps Des Amoreux Est Venue" – 2:35
8. "When We Refuse to Suffer" – 2:15
9. "This Romance Will Be Different for Me" – 3:21
10. "Old World" – 3:22
11. "Our Party Will Be On The Beach Tonight" – 4:03
12. "When We Refuse to Suffer" [Second Version] – 3:59
13. "Here It Is" – 4:27 (Leonard Cohen)
14. "As My Mother Lay Lying" – 3:05

== Personnel ==
- Jonathan Richman – vocals, guitar, percussion
- Tommy Larkins – drums, percussion
- Greg Keranen – bass on "Old World"
- Roger Montalbano – vocals on "When We Refuse To Suffer"
- Miles Montalbano – vocals, bass on "When We Refuse To Suffer"
- Suzanne Pieskar – piano on "Our Party Will Be On The Beach Tonight"

Technical

- Miles Montalbano, Rory Earnshaw – photography
