= The Ghost of Vermeer of Delft Which Can Be Used as a Table =

1934 painting by Salvador Dalí

- Artist: Salvador Dalí
- Year: 1934
- Medium: Oil on panel
- Dimensions: 18.1 cm × 13.97 cm (7.13 in × 5.5 in)
- Location: Salvador Dalí Museum; St. Petersburg, Florida

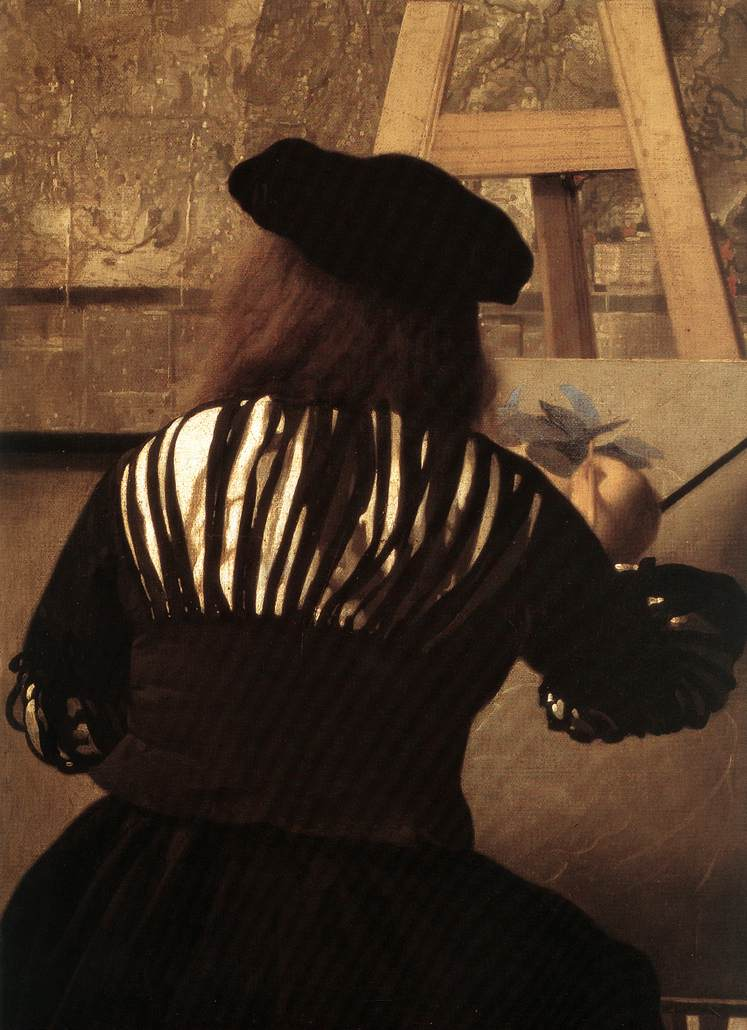
Detail of Vermeer's The Art of Painting showing the painter at his easel using a maulstick.

The Ghost of Vermeer of Delft Which Can Be Used as a Table is a small Surrealist oil painting by Salvador Dalí. Its full title is The Ghost of Vermeer of Delft Which Can Be Used as a Table (Phenomenologic Theory of Furniture-Nutrition). It makes reference to The Art of Painting by Johannes Vermeer, a famous seventeenth-century work in which a painter, thought to be a self-portrait of Vermeer, is depicted with his back to the viewer, in distinctive costume. It is one of a number of paintings expressive of Dalí's enormous admiration for Vermeer.

Vermeer is represented as a dark spindly figure in a kneeling position. The figure's outstretched leg serves as a tabletop surface, on which sits a bottle and a small glass. This leg tapers to a baluster-like stub; there is a shoe nearby. The walls and the distant views of the mountains are based on real views near Dalí's home in Port Lligat. In Vermeer's painting the artist leans on a maulstick, and his hand is painted with an unusual blurriness, perhaps to indicate movement. In Dalí's painting Vermeer rests the same arm on a crutch.

It is unsigned and undated but known to have been completed c.1934. It is currently on display at the Salvador Dalí Museum in St. Petersburg, Florida, on loan from the E. and A. Reynolds Morse collection.

== Related works ==
Around 1934, Dalí produced several other works inspired by Vermeer's The Art of Painting:

- Masquerader, Intoxicated by the Limpid Atmosphere (private collection)
- The Ghost of Vermeer of Delft (private collection, Switzerland)
- Enigmatic Elements in a Landscape (Fundació Gala-Salvador Dalí, Figueres)
- Spectre of Vermeer's Chair (private collection)

Dalí revered Vermeer, and also drew several times on his The Lacemaker, for instance in Paranoiac-Critical Study of Vermeer's Lacemaker. Dalí also painted a copy of The Lacemaker on commission from collector Robert Lehman. The Ghost of Vermeer should also be seen in the context of his other reworkings of historic paintings, such as several works inspired by Jean-François Millet's The Angelus. Images of anthropomorphic furniture as well as crutch-like objects are common in this period of his career.

== See also ==
- List of works by Salvador Dalí
