= Ut pictura poesis =

Latin phrase from Horace's Ars Poetica

Ut Pictura Poesis, by Charles François Hutin

Ut pictura poesis is an often-repeated Latin phrase, literally "as is painting so is poetry," which occurs most famously near the end of Horace's Ars Poetica. Horace meant that poetry (in its widest sense, "imaginative texts") merited the same careful interpretation that was, in Horace's day, reserved for painting.

Some centuries before, Simonides of Ceos (c. 556 – 468 BC) had stated, "Poema pictura loquens, pictura poema silens," meaning "Poetry is a speaking picture, painting a silent poetry." Throughout history, this claim has attracted spirited dispute. Plato found painting and writing to be unreliable sources of understanding since they simulated a false reality, and thus disregarded these practices entirely. In the Renaissance, a controversy arose over which of the two forms was superior, and it was concluded that painting took precedence because sight outranked hearing in the hierarchy of the senses. This resembles another heated debate at the time, the paragone, which opposed painting to sculpture.

Gotthold Ephraim Lessing opens his Laocoön: An Essay on the Limits of Painting and Poetry (1766) by observing that "the first who compared painting with poetry [Simonides of Ceos] was a man of fine feeling," though, Lessing makes it clear, not a critic or philosopher. Lessing argues that painting is a synchronic, visual phenomenon, one of space that is immediately in its entirety understood and appreciated, while poetry (again, in its widest sense) is a diachronic art of the ear, one that depends on time to unfold itself for the reader's appreciation. He recommends that poetry and painting should not be confused, and that they are best practiced and appreciated "As two equitable friendly neighbouring states."

Commenting on the significance of the phrase "ut pictura poesis", Leon Golden states:

Poetry resembles painting. Some works will captivate you when you stand very close to them and others if you are at a greater distance. This one prefers a darker vantage point, that one wants to be seen in the light since it feels no terror before the penetrating judgment of the critic. This pleases only once, that will give pleasure even if we go back to it ten times over.

W. J. T. Mitchell trenchantly observed that "We tend to think that to compare poetry with painting is to make a metaphor, while to differentiate poetry from painting is to state a literal truth."

In Horace's Ars Poetica, the phrase "ut pictura poesis" comes immediately after another famous quotation "bonus dormitat Homerus", literally "even Homer nods", an indication that even the most skilled poet can compose inferior verse.

== Alexander Pope ==
18th-century British poet Alexander Pope was partial to ut pictura poesis. He considered both painting and poetry to be equals, and "it can easily be seen that he held that there was a close relationship between the art of poetry and the art of painting, especially perhaps since such a relationship combined the two arts of which he was a practitioner." There is a note of Pope finding himself "in a larger context of a continuous line of poetic pictorialism". Ut pictura poesis surfaces in regards to Pope's "Rape of the Lock" through his in-depth descriptions of the characters and plot. Rebecca Ferguson, in her essay "'Quick as her Eyes, and as unfix'd as those': objectification and seeing in Pope's 'Rape of the Lock'", draws attention to these details, specifically with Belinda's character. Ferguson explains an aspect of how Pope was painting a character and a plot: "Pope's construction of Belinda seems to render her just such a 'frontier' between a constructive and a destructive chaos, between qualities which are 'neither inside nor outside', neither invested in her 'essential' self nor in her body," and

The belle is identified in many ways with the display of vessels and treasures around her, both as a consumer and as a figure who takes on some of the properties of those riches, yet her attractions are in the end not so much displayed as set in motion; she 'rises in her charms', 'awakens' and 'calls forth' her wonders and graces, culminating in the dispersal of both her body and her allure in the reader's eye.

There is an emphasis on the reader's eye and the imagery that contributed to audience members being able to so vividly 'watch' the plot of this poem unfold.
