= Not So Much to Be Loved as to Love =

Studio album by Jonathan Richman
- Released: June 22, 2004
- Recorded: Mobius, San Francisco
- Length: 38:35
- Labels: Vapor; Sanctuary

Jonathan Richman chronology
Action Packed: The Best of Jonathan Richman (2002)	Not So Much to Be Loved as to Love (2004)	Revolution Summer (2007)

Professional ratings
Review scores
Source	Rating
AllMusic	3.5/5 stars
The Encyclopedia of Popular Music	2/5 stars
Pitchfork	8.1/10

Not So Much to Be Loved as to Love is an album by Jonathan Richman, released in 2004. The title is excerpted from Make Me an Instrument of Your Peace, "O Divine Master, grant that I may not so much seek ... to be loved, as to love."

The album contains two unlisted bonus tracks: "The Sea Was Calling Me Home" and an alternate version of the title track.

== Track listing ==
All tracks composed by Jonathan Richman

1. "Not So Much to Be Loved as to Love" Version 1 – 2:53
2. "Sunday Afternoon" – 1:18
3. "Vincent Van Gogh" – 3:05
4. "Cosi Veloce" – 3:31
5. "He Gave Us the Wine to Taste" – 2:41
6. "Salvador Dali" – 2:22
7. "My Baby Love Love Loves Me" – 3:11
8. "In che mondo viviamo" – 2:26
9. "Behold the Lilies of the Field" – 3:07
10. "Les etoiles" – 2:14
11. "The World Is Showing Its Hand" – 2:24
12. "Abu Jamal" – 2:18
13. "On a du soleil" – 2:13
14. "I Had a Dream That the Sea" – 2:06
15. "Not So Much to Be Loved as to Love" Version 2 – 2:46

== Personnel ==
- Jonathan Richman - vocals, guitar
- Greg Keranen, Miles Montalbano - bass
- Tommy Larkins - drums
- Ralph Carney - brass, woodwind, percussion
- Alison Faith-Levy, Chuck Prophet, Dave Sorrenson, Jenny Rae Richman, Liz Zoria, Nicole Montalbano, Roger Montalbano, Stephanie Finch, Susan Hertzfeld - backing vocals

Technical

- Oliver Dicicco - engineer
- Miles Montalbano - layout, design
- Marty Crosley - cover photography
