= Maulstick =

Painter's stick used to support working hand

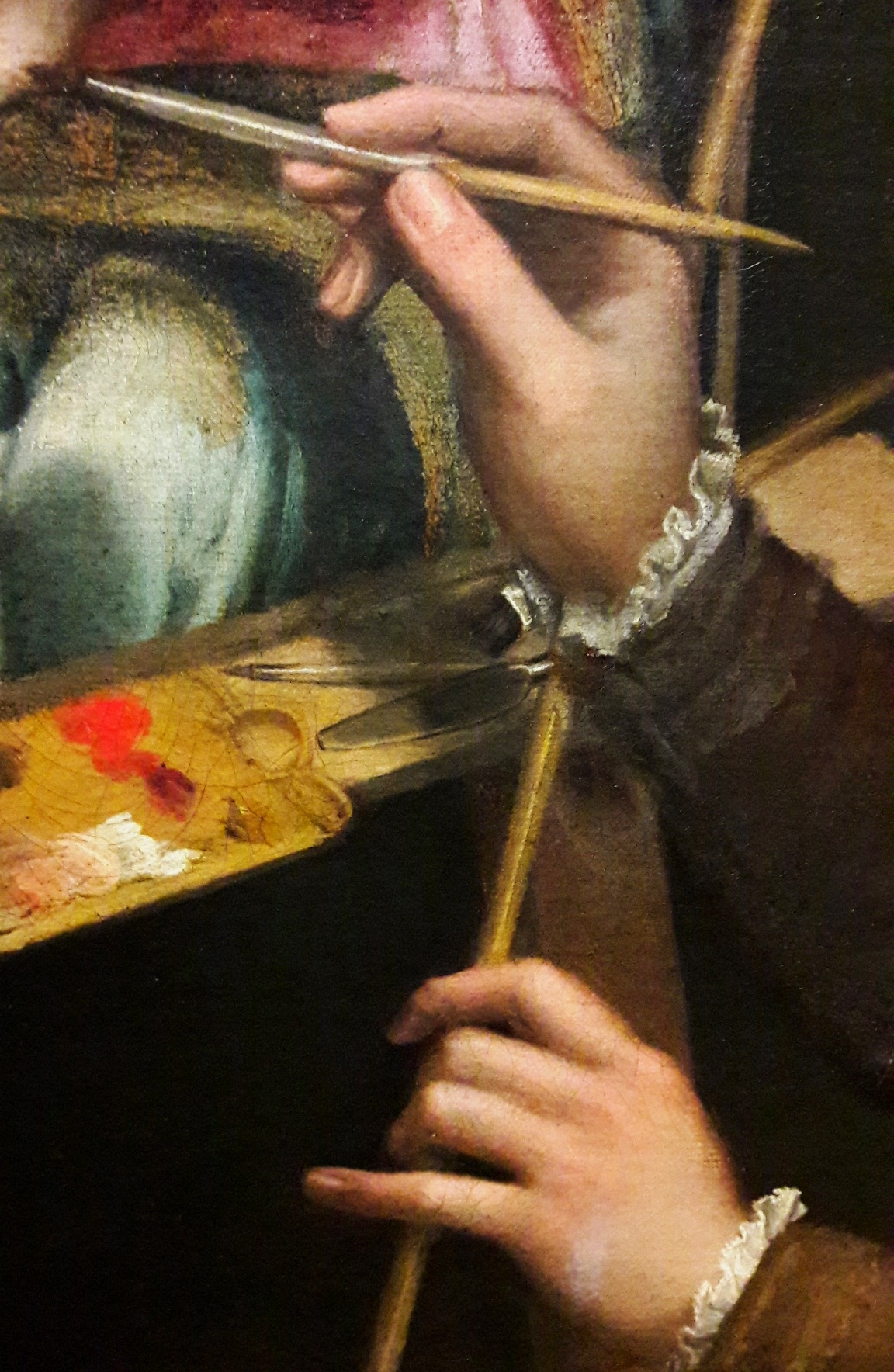
Closeup image of maulstick being used by painter

A maulstick or mahlstick /ˈmɔːlstɪk/ MAWL-stik is a stick with a soft leather or padded head used by painters to support the working hand with a paintbrush or pen. The word derives from the German and Dutch Malstock or maalstok 'painting stick', from malen which means 'to paint' in German and Middle Dutch. In contemporary Dutch it only means 'to grind'.

In 16th- through 19th-century paintings of artists, including self-portraits, the maulstick is often depicted as part of the painter's equipment.

== Gallery ==
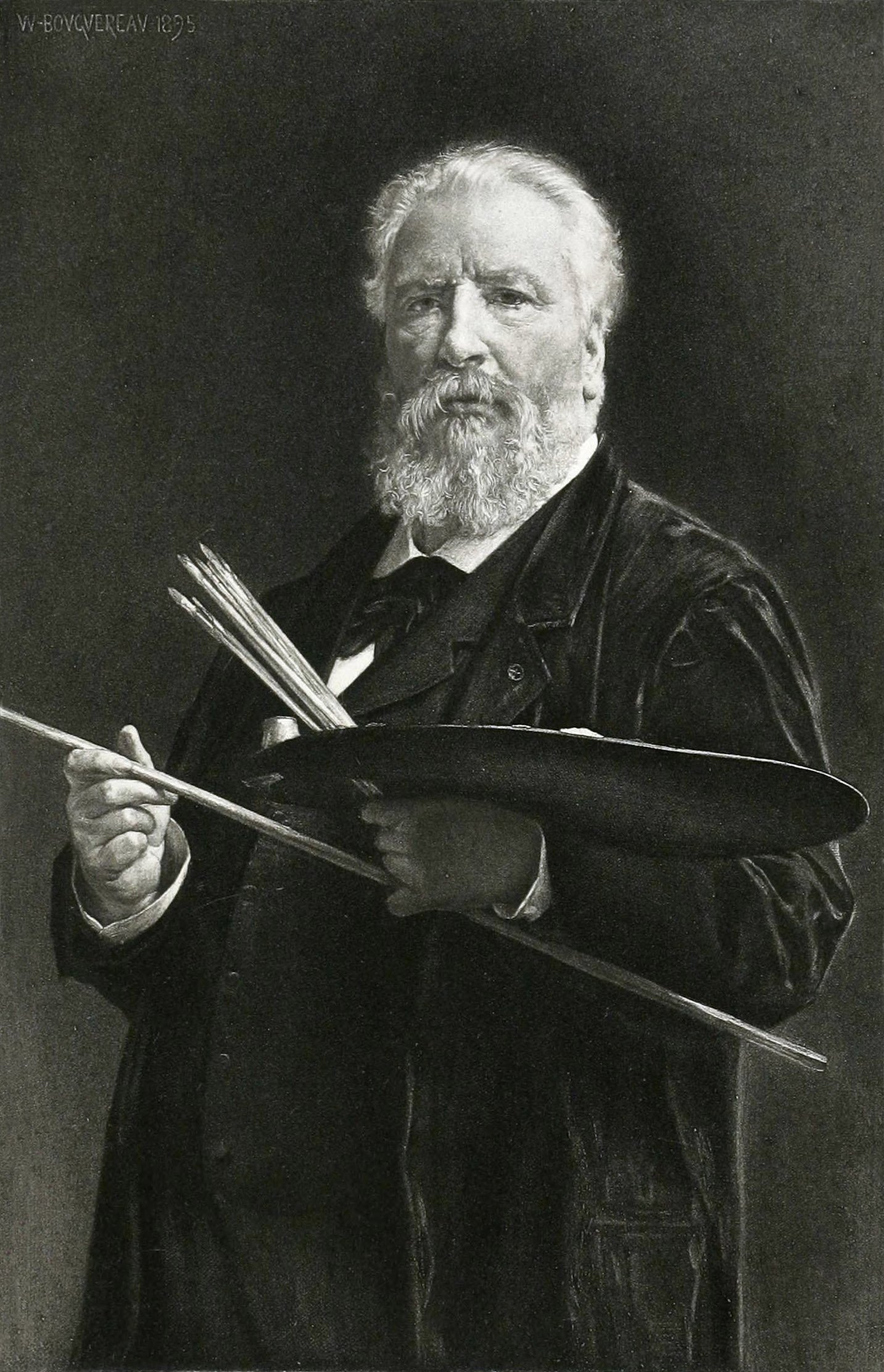
William-Adolphe Bouguereau holding painting implements

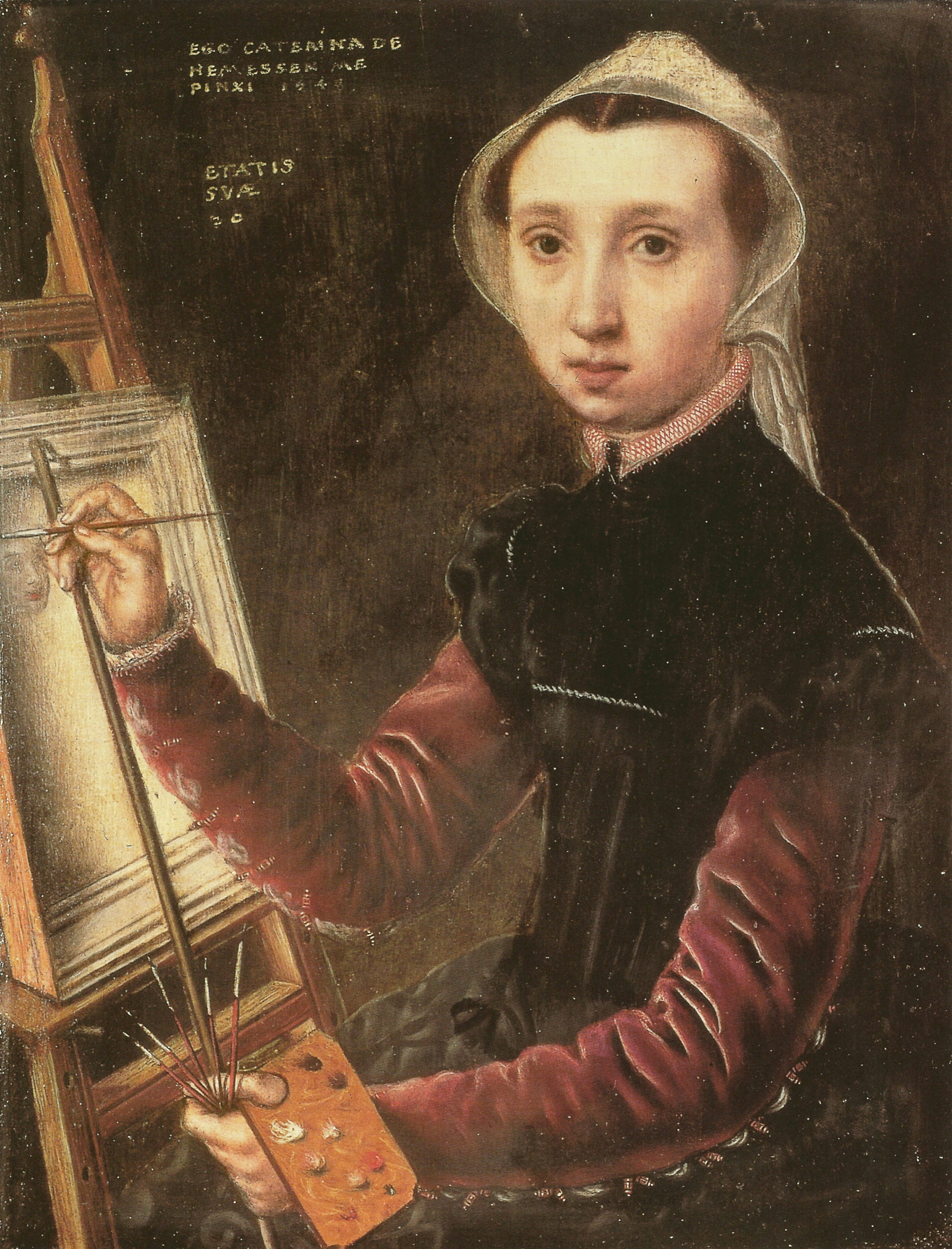
Self portrait of Caterina van Hemessen

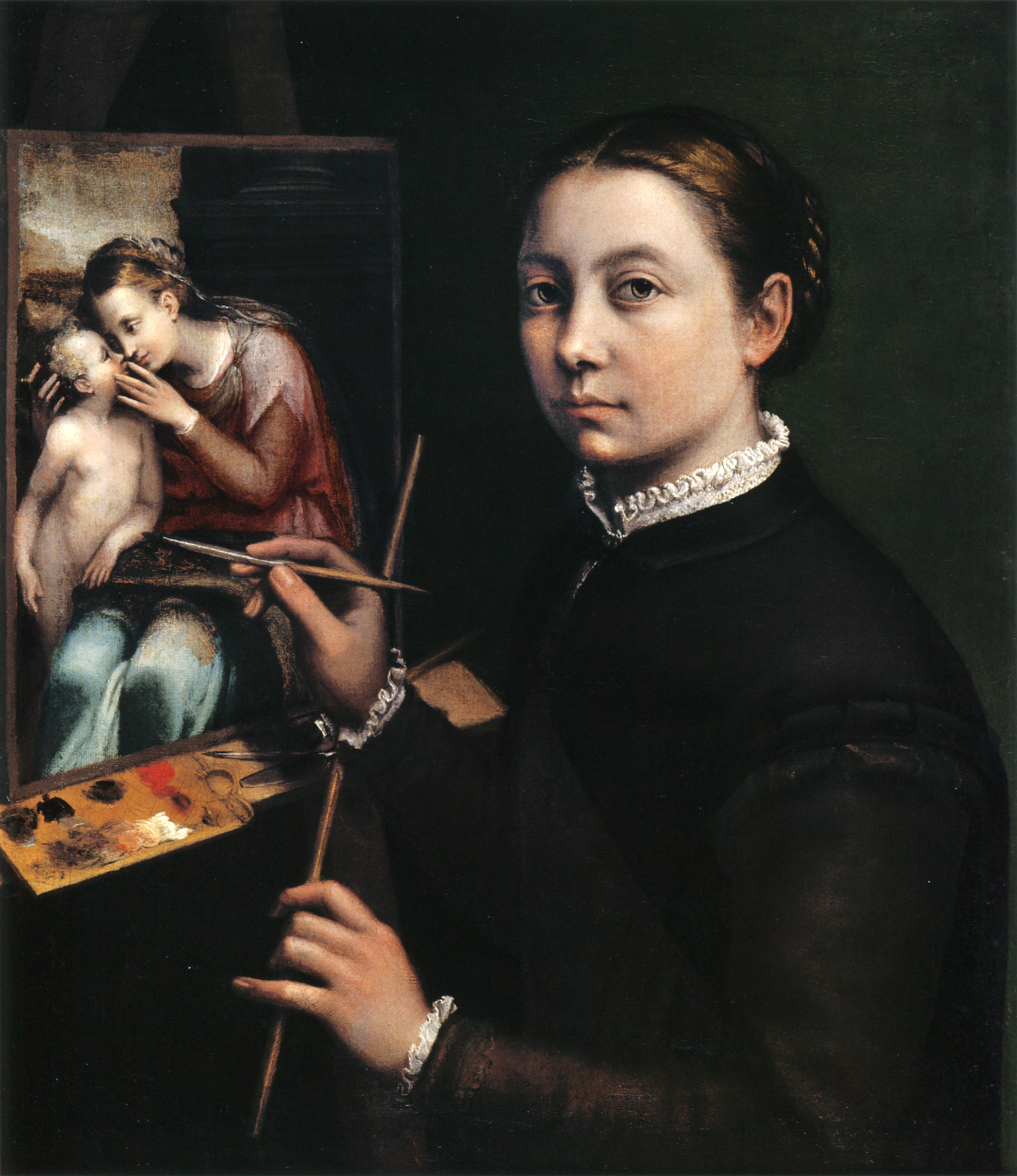
Self-portrait by Sofonisba Anguissola

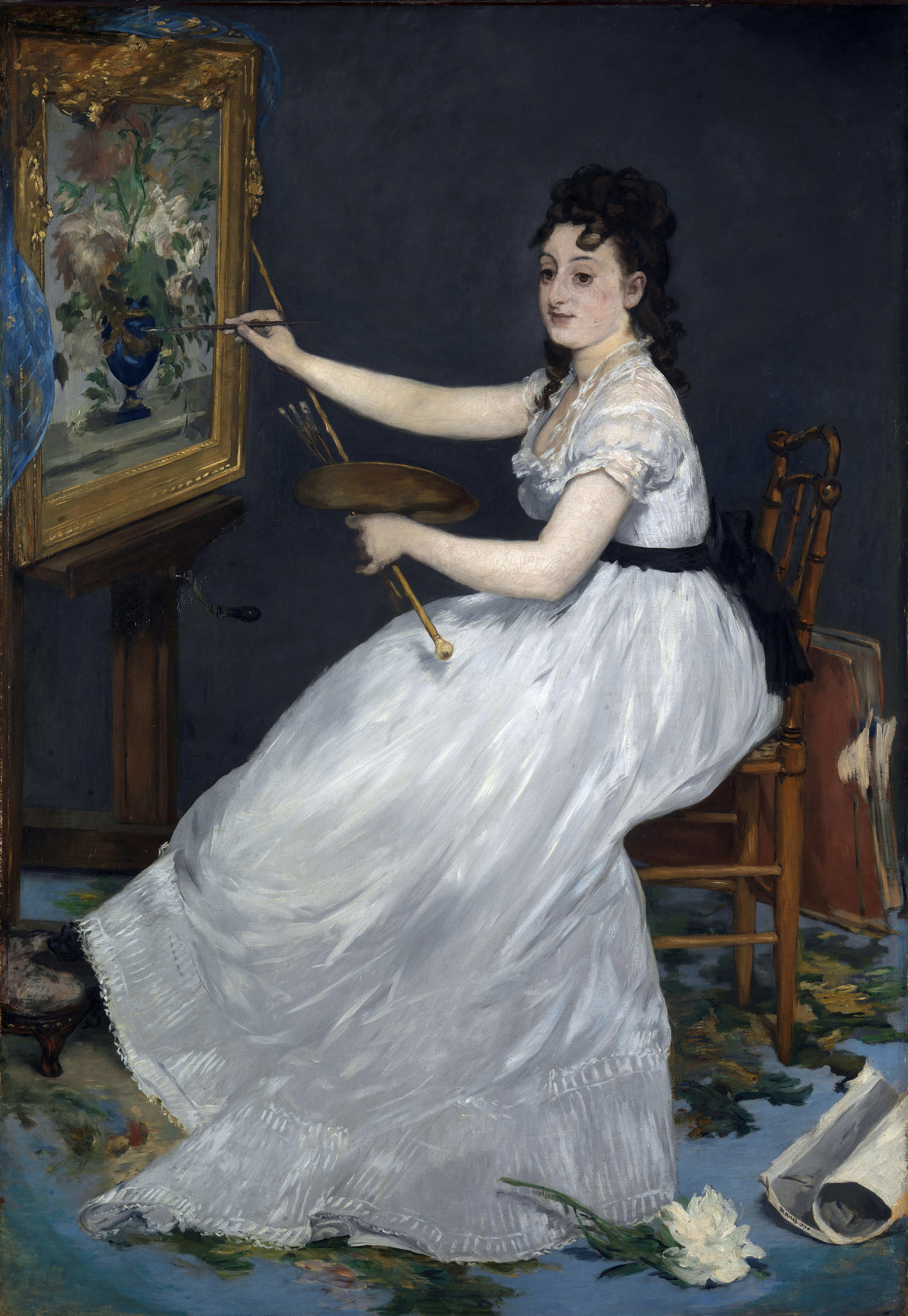
Portrait of Eva Gonzalès, by Édouard Manet

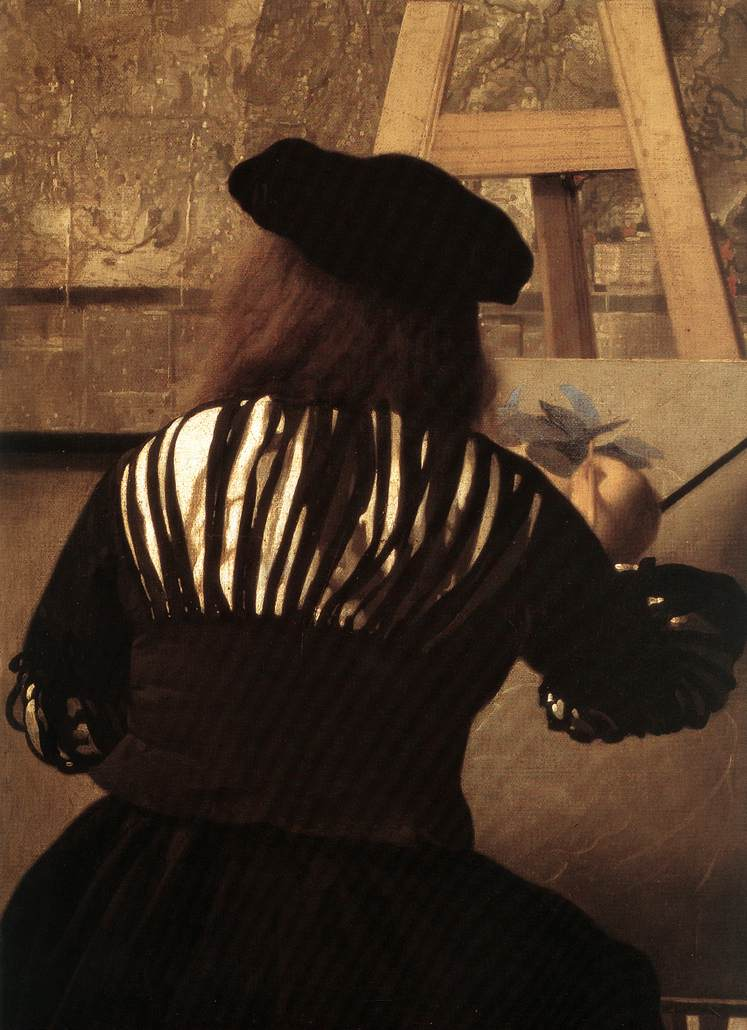
Detail of Vermeer's The Art of Painting with artist using mahlstick
