= Revolution Summer (album) =

Soundtrack album by Jonathan Richman
- Released: 2007
- Recorded: at SF Soundworks, San Francisco, California
- Genre: Rock 'n' roll, soundtrack, Americana
- Length: 28:10
- Label: Vapor Records

Jonathan Richman chronology
Not So Much to Be Loved as to Love (2004)	Revolution Summer (2007)	Because Her Beauty Is Raw and Wild (2008)

Revolution Summer is a soundtrack album by Jonathan Richman, released by the Vapor Records label in 2007. The music was composed for the film Revolution Summer, directed by Miles Matthew Montalbano.

While Richman had previously contributed songs to the 1998 film, There's Something About Mary, and appeared in that film, along with drummer Tommy Larkins, Revolution Summer is Richman's first complete soundtrack album. It is entirely instrumental, another first for Richman.

== Track listing ==
All music composed by Jonathan Richman

1. "Weeds Breaking Through The Concrete" (1:02)
2. "Revolution Summer Theme" (2:01)
3. "Francine's Theme" (1:31)
4. "A Chill in the Night Air' (1.21)
5. "Music for Next Year's Jukebox" (3:22)
6. "Hipster Cafe" (1:10)
7. "Vacant Lot" (5:16)
8. "Hope's Theme" (1:35)
9. "Francine's Theme (Reprise)" (3:43)
10. "Hope's Theme (Reprise)" (0:41)
11. "Weeds Breaking Through The Concrete (Reprise)" (4:03)
12. "Now What?" (2:33)

== Personnel ==
- Jonathan Richman - guitars, bass, pump organ
- Tommy Larkins - drums and percussion
- Ralph Carney - woodwinds, violin, pedal steel
- Charles Gonzalez - keyboards, bass on Music For Next Year's Jukebox
