= Paragone =

Debate during the Italian Renaissance

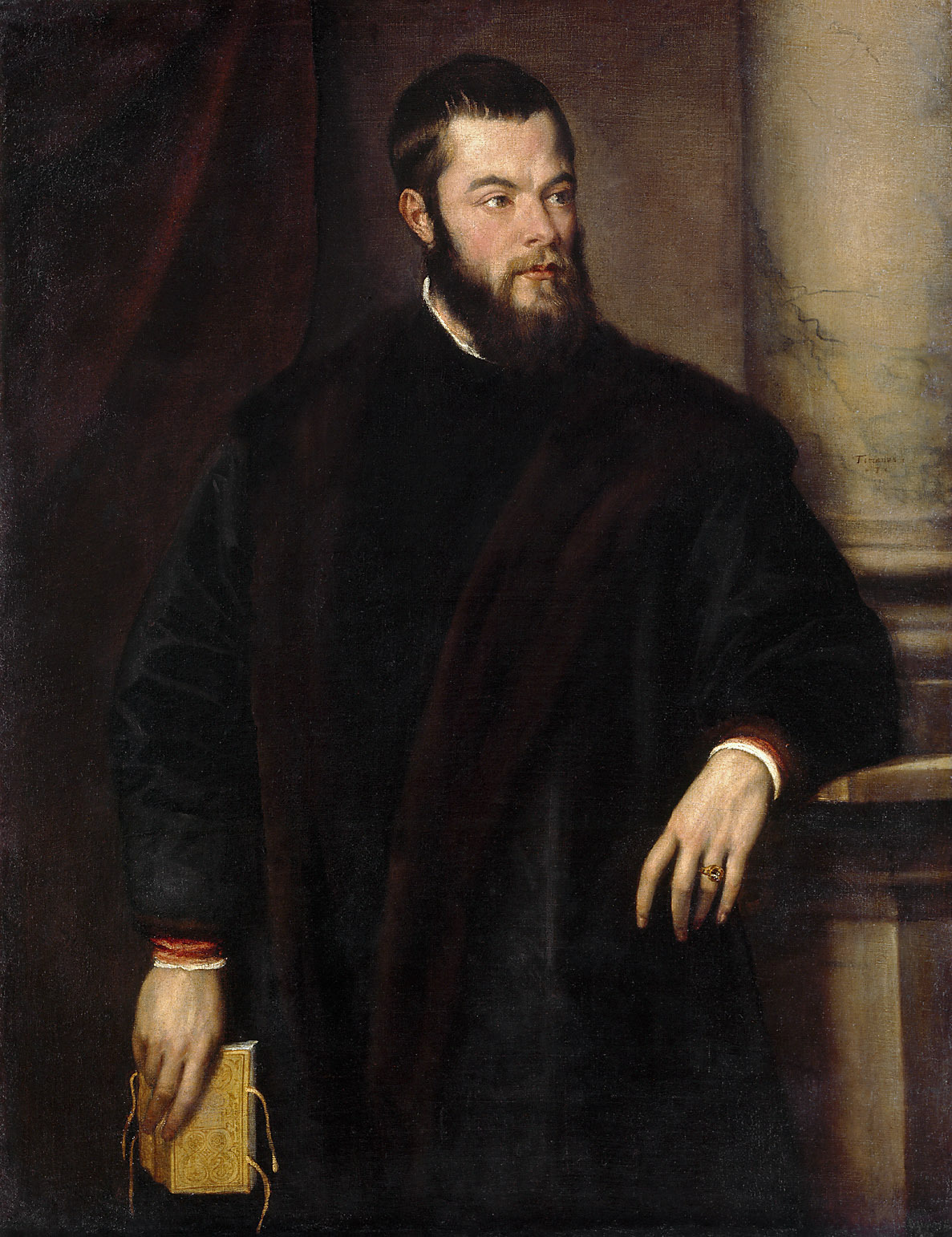
Benedetto Varchi, by Titian

Paragone (Italian: paragone, meaning comparison), was a debate during the Italian Renaissance in which painting and sculpture (and to a degree, architecture) were each championed as forms of art superior and distinct to each other. While other art forms, such as architecture and poetry, existed in the context of the debate, painting and sculpture were the primary focus of the debate.

The debate extended beyond the fifteenth century and even influences the discussion and interpretation of artworks that may or may not have been influenced by the debate itself.

A comparable question, generally posed less competitively, was known as ut pictura poesis (a quote from Horace), comparing the qualities of painting and poetry.

== The debate ==
The debate began around the 15th century. Leonardo da Vinci's treatise on painting, observing the difficulty of painting and supremacy of sight, is a notable example of literature on the subject.

Bendetto Varchi further sparked the conversation between artists in 1546 by sending out letters inviting opinions. Painters and sculptors each vied for their respective side in the debate. Michelangelo was the only artist who offered support for both mediums. However, he was also found to be less invested in the discussion despite his contributions.

The essence of the debate had many facets. Comparisons of the two mediums ranged from conceptual themes to practices, underscoring the intellectual role of the artist in the era.

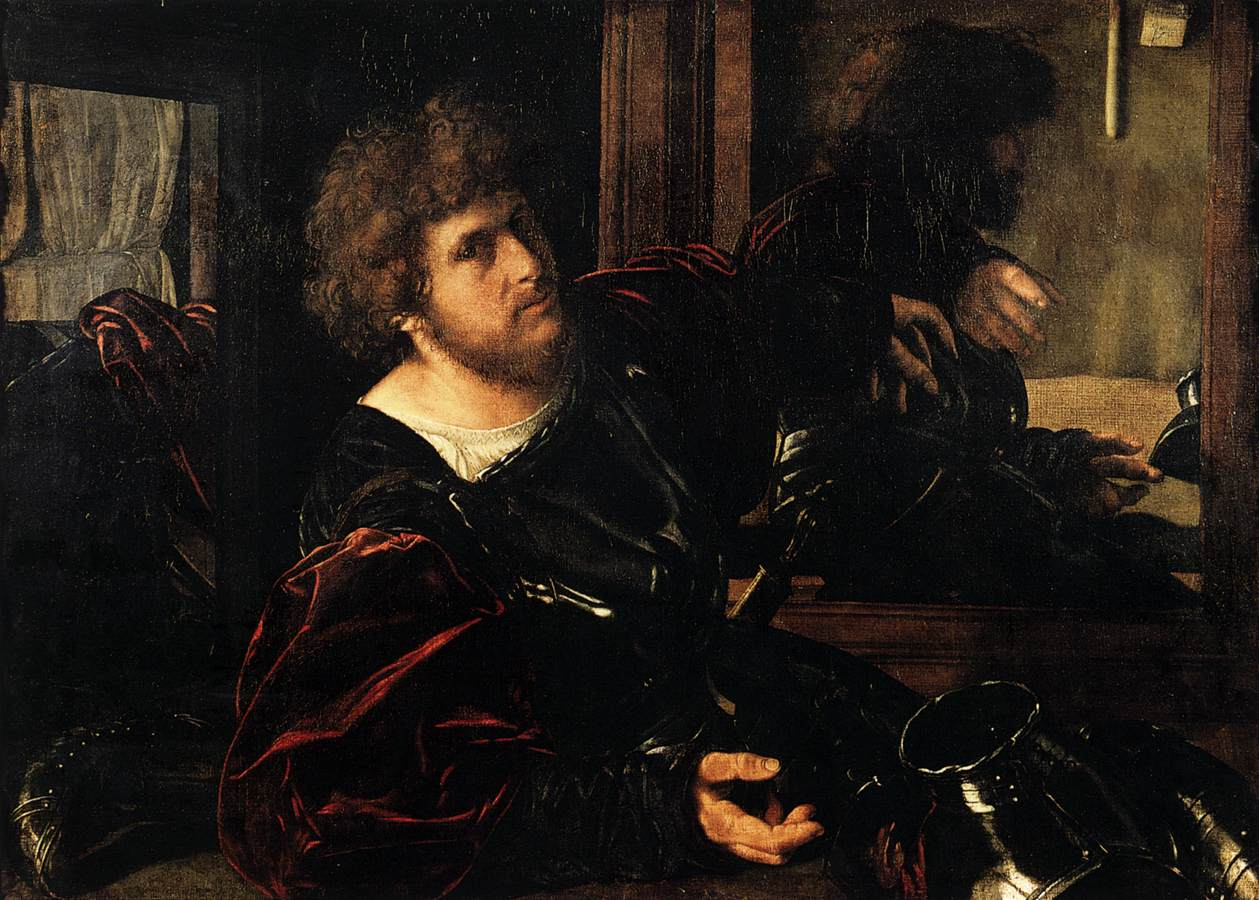
Geralamo Salvado's Gaston de la Foix

Each medium had multiple points in support of it. Much of the debate lacked specific examples of supporting work, though the ideas were extensively discussed. Giorgio Vasari argued that drawing is the father of all arts, and as such, the most important one. Sculpture was typically claimed to be the only method of having several different and faithful views of the same figure by those who found it to be the superior medium. A counterpoint to this argument was made in paintings which feature reflective objects or surfaces, such as the Portrait of Gaston de la Foix by Gerolamo Savoldo, which featured mirrors surrounding the key figure. This allowed figures not only to be viewed at multiple angles, but for these to be seen at the same time, which is an ability that sculpture is incapable of providing. Many paintings with this concept are brought into the discussion of paragone, but it is unclear how many were actually made as a response to the debate itself.

A large portion of the discussion was centered on the idea of imitation of the natural world. Painting was seen to create an inferior imitation because it lacked form. This argument was later championed by the example of a blind man experiencing art. Theoretically, he could gather how a sculpture was structured through touch, but were he to touch a painting he would not be able to construct an image of the work, thus rendering painting an illusionary form of art.

Another side of the debate that arose is one of technical skill. Michelangelo did not take a clear side in the debates, but did underscore a component which he believed to be essential to both painting and sculpture, called disegno. Disegno in Renaissance times largely referred to "the conception of a work." The understanding and use of the term was also, however, influenced by the idea of drawing as the foundation of art. Vasari and with him Benvenuto Cellini, also asserted that the ability to render an accurate contour line was technical skills that benefited both painting and sculpture.

=== Modeling vs. carving ===
The debate was ongoing between the sculptors as well, with many identifying two different methods, additive modeling from clay or plaster and subtractive carving of hard materials like marble. Group around Michelangelo, thought that modeling was closer to painting, with Michelangelo himself declaring, "By sculpture I mean that which is fashioned by the effort of taking away, that which is made by way of building up is like painting." His opponents, Raffaello Borghini, pointed that God himself had made humans from clay and thus practiced modeling.

== Notable contributors ==
Many notable artists and other public figures during the fifteenth century and onward contributed to the discussion of paragone, such as:

- Benvenuto Cellini
- Leonardo da Vinci
- Michelangelo
- Pontormo
- Bendetto Varchi
- Giorgio Vasari
