= Simon Duiker =

Dutch painter

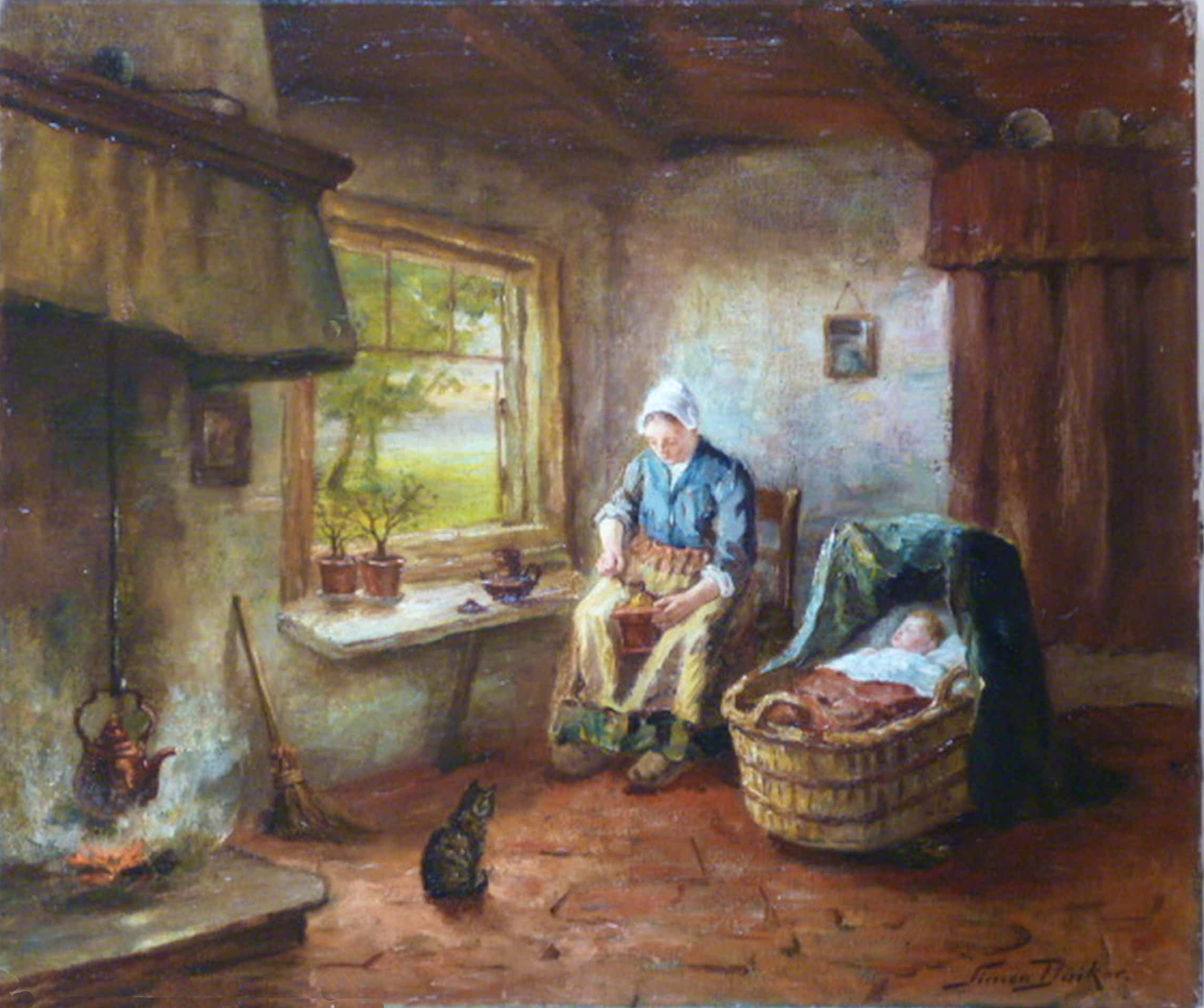
Farmhouse interior, c. 1900

Simon Liekele Eeltje Duiker (16 April 1874, Amsterdam – 6 March 1941, Amsterdam) was a Dutch painter.

Duiker lived and worked in Amsterdam while studying at its National Academy. He painted interior scenes and still life paintings. His work depicts middle class Dutch life, particularly men and women at work in the home.

Duiker was greatly influenced by the work of Jan Vermeer. Duiker, along with Jacques Snoeck and Gijbertus Jan Sijhoff, is considered one of the last great Dutch interior scene painters. Duiker's paintings are part of the Dutch National Collection (Rijkscollectie).
