= List of Santana band members =

Band members of Santana

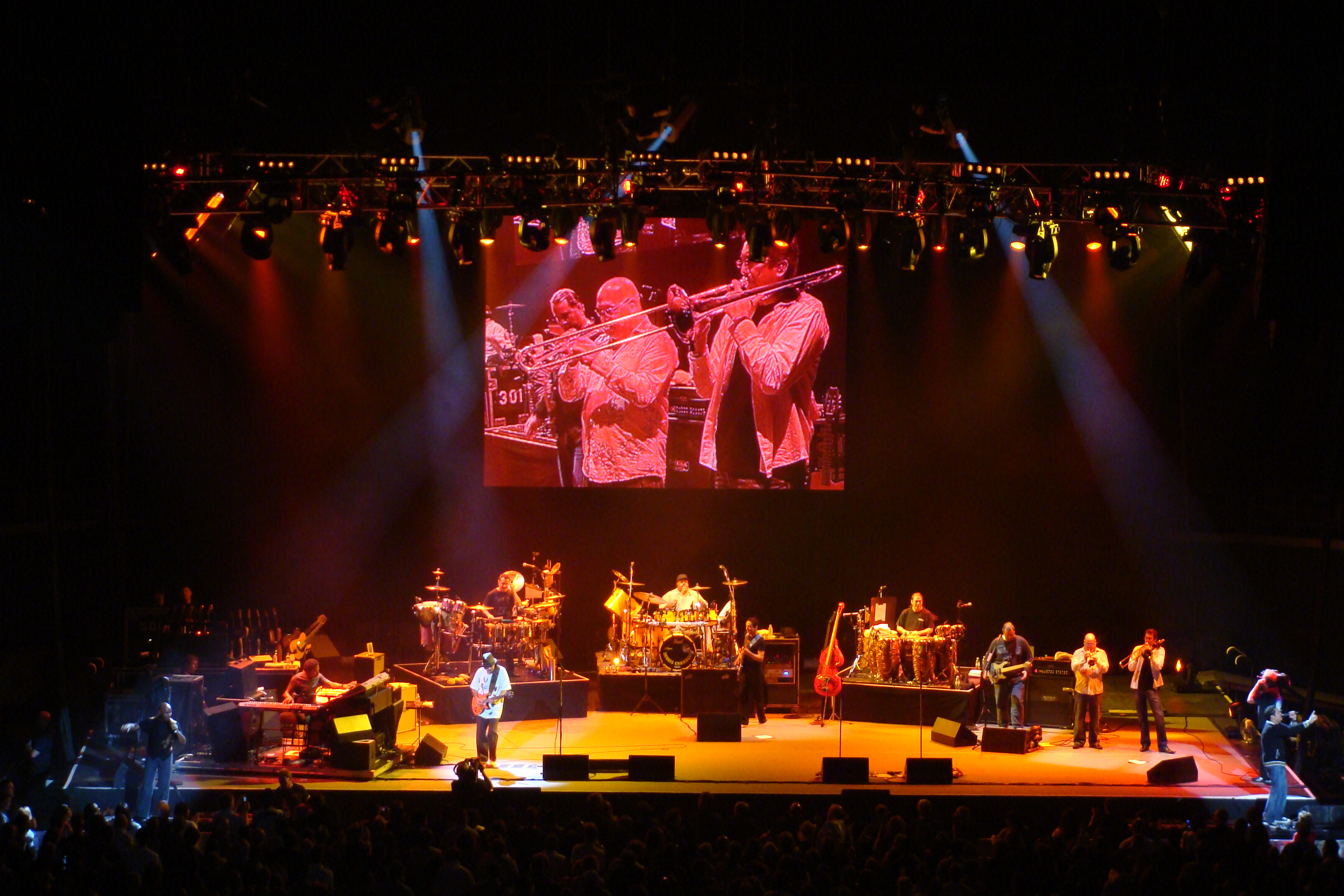
Santana performing in 2008

Santana is an American rock band formed in San Francisco in 1966 by Mexican-born guitarist Carlos Santana. The band has undergone various recording and performing line-ups in its history, with Santana being the only consistent member. In 1998, the lineup of Santana, Rolie, Carabello, Shrieve, Brown and Areas was inducted into the Rock and Roll Hall of Fame.

Santana is one of the best-selling groups of all time with an estimated 100 million albums sold worldwide.

== History ==
Santana was founded by eponymous guitarist Carlos Santana in late 1966, the band's first line-up included Sergio "Gus" Rodriguez on bass, Danny Haro on drums, and Michael Carabello on percussion. By February 1967, the band were joined by Tom Fraser on guitar and vocals, who also brought in Gregg Rolie on organ and vocals. After losing out on a residency in June 1967, due to members not being committed, Santana and Rolie brought in new musicians.

== Members ==
Bold denotes members of the classic line-up.

=== Current members ===
Image	Name	Years active	Instruments	Release contributions
	**Carlos Santana**	1966–present	lead guitar; vocals; percussion	all releases
	Benny Rietveld	1990–1992; 1997–present	bass	Spirits Dancing in the Flesh (1990); Milagro (1992); all releases from Supernatural (1999) onwards, except Live at the Fillmore 1968 (1997), The Very Best of Santana – Live in 1968 (2007) and The Woodstock Experience (2009)
	Karl Perazzo	1991–present	timbales; congas; percussion; vocals	all release from Milagro (1992) onwards, except Live at the Fillmore 1968 (1997), The Very Best of Santana – Live in 1968 (2007) and The Woodstock Experience (2009)
	Andy Vargas	2000–present	vocals; percussion	all releases from All That I Am (2005) onwards, except The Very Best of Santana – Live in 1968 (2007) and The Woodstock Experience (2009)
	Tommy Anthony	2005–present	rhythm guitar; vocals	all releases from Guitar Heaven (2010) onwards
	David K. Matthews	2011–present	keyboards	all releases from Corazón (2014) onwards
	Paoli Mejías	2013–present	congas; percussion	Corazón (2014); Corazón: Live from México - Live It to Believe It (2014)
	Cindy Blackman Santana	2015–present	drums	Corazón (2014); Corazón: Live from México - Live It to Believe It (2014); In Search of Mona Lisa (2019); Africa Speaks (2019)
	Ray Greene	2016–present	vocals; percussion; trombone	In Search of Mona Lisa (2019); Africa Speaks (2019)
	Salvador Santana	2025–present	keyboards; vocals	none to date

=== Former members ===
Image	Name	Years active	Instruments	Release contributions
	**Gregg Rolie**	1966–1972; 2014–2016	organ; piano; keyboards; lead vocals	all releases from Santana (1969) to Caravanserai (1972); Santana's Greatest Hits (1974); Shangó (1982); Freedom (1987); Live at the Fillmore 1968 (1997); The Very Best of Santana – Live in 1968 (2007); The Woodstock Experience (2009); Santana IV (2016); Santana IV: Live at the House of Blues, Las Vegas (2016)
	Tom Fraser	1966–1967	guitars	none
	Sergio "Gus" Rodriguez	1966–1967	bass	none
	Danny Haro	1966–1967	drums	none
	**Michael Carabello**	1966–1967; 1968–1971; 2014–2016	congas; percussion; possible keyboards; vocals	Santana (1969); Abraxas (1970); Santana III (1971); Santana's Greatest Hits (1974); The Woodstock Experience (2009); Santana IV (2016); Santana IV: Live at the House of Blues, Las Vegas (2016)
	**David Brown**	1967–1971; 1974–1976 (died 2000)	bass	Santana (1969); Abraxas (1970); Santana III (1971); Santana's Greatest Hits (1974); Borboletta (1974); Amigos (1976); Live at the Fillmore 1968 (1997); The Very Best of Santana – Live in 1968 (2007); The Woodstock Experience (2009)
	Marcus Malone	1967–1969 (died 2021)	congas; percussion	Live at the Fillmore 1968 (1997); The Very Best of Santana – Live in 1968 (2007)
	Don Wehr	1967	drums	none
	Rod Harper	1967	drums	none
	Bob Livingston	1967–1969	drums	Live at the Fillmore 1968 (1997); The Very Best of Santana – Live in 1968 (2007)
	Johnny Rae	1969	drums	none
	**José "Chepito" Areas**	1969–1974; 1976–1977; 1988–1989	timbales; congas; percussion; drums; trumpet	Santana (1969); Abraxas (1970); Santana III (1971); Caravanserai (1972); Welcome (1973); Lotus (1974); Santana's Greatest Hits (1974); Festivál (1977); Moonflower (1977); The Woodstock Experience (2009)
	**Michael "Mike" Shrieve**	1969–1974; 2014–2016	drums; percussion; occasional vocals	all releases from Santana to Borboletta (1974); The Woodstock Experience (2009); Santana IV (2016); Santana IV: Live at the House of Blues, Las Vegas (2016)
	Neal Schon	1971–1972; 2014–2016	lead and rhythm guitar; vocals	Santana III (1971); Caravanserai (1972); Santana IV (2016); Santana IV: Live at the House of Blues, Las Vegas (2016)
	Buddy Miles	1971; 1972; 1986; 1987 (died 2008)	drums and percussion (1971, 1972); vocals and guitar (1986, 1987)	Freedom (1987)
	Pete Escovedo	1971; 1977–1979	timbales; percussion	Moonflower (1977); Inner Secrets (1978)
	Coke Escovedo	1971–1972 (died 1986)	timbales; percussion	Santana III (1971); Santana's Greatest Hits (1974)
	Rico Reyes	1971–1972	percussion; vocals	Abraxas (1970); Santana III (1971); Caravanserai (1972)
	Tom Rutley	1971–1972	bass; acoustic bass	Caravanserai (1972)
	James "Mingo" Lewis	1971–1973 (died 2026)	congas; percussion	Caravanserai (1972)
	Victor Pantoja	1971	congas; percussion	none
	Armando Peraza	1972–1976; 1977–1990; (died 2014)	congas; bongos; percussion; vocals	all releases from Caravanserai (1972) to Spirits Dancing in the Flesh (1990)
	Tom Coster	1972–1978; 1983–1984	keyboards; backing vocals	all releases from Caravanserai (1972) to Moonflower (1977)
	Richard Kermode	1972–1973 (died 1996)	keyboards	Welcome (1973); Lotus (1974)
	Doug Rauch	1972–1974 (died 1979)	bass; guitar	Caravanserai (1972); Welcome (1973); Lotus (1974)
	Leon Thomas	1973 (died 1999)	vocals	Welcome (1973); Lotus (1974)
	Leon "Ndugu" Chancler	1974–1976; 1988 (died 2018)	drums	Borboletta (1974); Amigos (1976)
	Leon Patillo	1974–1975; 1976	vocals; keyboards; piano; percussion	Borboletta (1974); Festivál (1977)
	Jules Broussard	1974–1975	saxophone	Welcome (1973); Borboletta (1974)
	Greg Walker	1975–1976; 1976–1979; 1983–1985	vocals	Amigos (1976); Moonflower (1977); Inner Secrets (1978); Beyond Appearances (1985)
	Raul Rekow	1976–2013 (died 2015)	congas; bongos; percussion; vocals	all releases from Festivál (1977) to Shape Shifter (2012), except Live at the Fillmore 1968 (1997), The Very Best of Santana – Live in 1968 (2007) and The Woodstock Experience (2009)
	Gaylord Birch	1976; 1991 (died 1996)	drums; percussion	Festivál (1977)
	Graham Lear	1976–1983; 1985–1987	drums	Moonflower (1977); Inner Secrets (1978); Marathon (1979); Zebop! (1981); Shangó (1982)
	Luther Rabb	1976 (died 2006)	vocals	none
	Joel Badie	1976	vocals	Festivál (1977)
	Byron Miller	1976	bass	none
	Pablo Tellez	1976–1977	bass	Festivál (1977); Moonflower (1977)
	David Margen	1977–1982	bass	Moonflower (1977); Inner Secrets (1978); Marathon (1979); Zebop! (1981); Shangó (1982)
	Chris Solberg	1978–1980	guitars; keyboards; vocals	Inner Secrets (1978); Marathon (1979); Zebop! (1981)
	Chris Rhyne	1978–1979	keyboards	Inner Secrets (1978)
	Russell Tubbs	1978	flute	none
	Alex Ligertwood	1979–1983; 1984–1985; 1987; 1989–1991; 1992–1994 (died 2026)	vocals; rhythm guitar	Marathon (1979); Zebop! (1981); Shangó (1982); Beyond Appearances (1985); Spirits Dancing in the Flesh (1990); Milagro (1992); Sacred Fire: Live in South America (1993)
	Alan Pasqua	1979–1980	keyboards; vocals	Marathon (1979); Zebop! (1981)
	Orestes Vilató	1980–1987	timbales; percussion; vocals	Zebop! (1981); Shangó (1982); Beyond Appearances (1985); Freedom (1987); Spirits Dancing in the Flesh (1990)
	Richard Baker	1980–1982	keyboards	Zebop! (1981); Shangó (1982)
	Chester D. Thompson	1983–2009	keyboards; arrangements; vocals	all releases from Beyond Appearances (1985) to Shape Shifter (2012), except Live at the Fillmore 1968 (1997), The Very Best of Santana – Live in 1968 (2007), The Woodstock Experience (2009) and Guitar Heaven (2010)
	Keith Jones	1983–1984; 1989	bass	none
	David Sancious	1984	rhythm guitar; keyboards	Beyond Appearances (1985)
	Chester C. Thompson	1984	drums	Beyond Appearances (1985)
	Alphonso Johnson	1984; 1985–1989; 1992	bass	Beyond Appearances (1985); Freedom (1987); Spirits Dancing in the Flesh (1990)
	Sterling Crew	1985–1986	keyboards	Freedom (1987)
	Walfredo Reyes Jr.	1989–1991; 1992–1993	drums	Spirits Dancing in the Flesh (1990); Milagro (1992); Sacred Fire: Live in South America (1993)
	Billy Johnson	1991; 1994; 2000–2001	drums	Milagro (1992); Supernatural (1999); Shaman (2002)
	Tony Lindsay	1991; 1995–2004; 2007–2015	vocals	Milagro (1992); Supernatural (1999); Shaman (2002); Shape Shifter (2012); Corazón (2014); Corazón: Live from México - Live It to Believe It (2014)
	Myron Dove	1992–1996; 2003–2005	bass; rhythm guitar	Sacred Fire: Live in South America (1993)
	Vorriece Cooper	1992–1993	vocals	Sacred Fire: Live in South America (1993)
	Oran Coltrane	1992	saxophone	none
	Rodney Holmes	1993–1994; 1997–2000; (died 2026)	drums	none
	Tommie Bradford	1994	drums	none
	Curtis Salgado	1995	vocals; harmonica	none
	Horacio "El Negro" Hernandez	1997	drums	Supernatural (1999)
	Ricky Wellman	1997	drums	none
	William "Bill" Ortiz	1999–2016	trumpet	Milagro (1992); all releases from Supernatural (1999) to Corazón: Live from México - Live It to Believe It (2014)
	Jeff Cressman	1999–2016	trombone	all releases from Supernatural (1999) to Corazón: Live from México - Live It to Believe It (2014)
	Dennis Chambers	2002–2013	drums	All That I Am (2005); Guitar Heaven (2010); Shape Shifter (2012); Corazón (2014)
	Christopher A. Scott	2002–2005	bass; vocals	none
	Freddie Ravel	2009–2010	keyboards	Guitar Heaven (2010)
	José "Pepe" Jimenez	2013–2015	drums	none
