= Santana's Greatest Hits =

Greatest hits album by Santana
- Released: July 1974
- Recorded: May 1969 – July 1971
- Genres: Blues rock; jazz fusion
- Length: 34:31
- Label: Columbia/CBS
- Producer: Santana

Santana chronology
Lotus (1974)	Santana's Greatest Hits (1974)	Borboletta (1974)

Professional ratings
Review scores
Source	Rating
AllMusic	4.5/5 stars
Christgau's Record Guide	B−
Rolling Stone	(not rated)
The Rolling Stone Album Guide	5/5 stars

Santana's Greatest Hits is a 1974 compilation album by Santana. It offers highlights from the group's first three albums. It is the band's best-selling compilation album, selling over 7 million copies in the United States.

Three of the tracks are the edited single versions, as annotated below.

== Track listing ==
1. "Evil Ways" (Single version) (Clarence "Sonny" Henry) (from Santana, 1969) - 3:00
2. "Jin-go-lo-ba" (Babatunde Olatunji) from Santana - 2:44
3. "Hope You're Feeling Better" (Gregg Rolie) (from Abraxas, 1970) - 4:11
4. "Samba Pa Ti" (Carlos Santana) (from Abraxas) - 4:47
5. "Persuasion" (Single version) (Santana, Rolie, José Areas, David Brown, Michael Shrieve, Michael Carabello) (from Santana) - 2:34
6. "Black Magic Woman" (Single version) (Peter Green) (from Abraxas) - 3:17
7. "Oye Como Va" (Tito Puente) (from Abraxas) - 4:19
8. "Everything's Coming Our Way" (Santana) (from Santana III, 1971) - 3:16
9. "Se a Cabó" (Areas) (from Abraxas) - 2:51
10. "Everybody's Everything" (Santana, Tyrone Moss, Brown) (from Santana III) - 3:31

The Mexican edition of this album (Los Grandes Exitos de Santana - CBS CLS-5453) has the following variations:

1. "Sin Depender de Nadie" ("No One to Depend On") as the fifth track on side one (replacing "Persuasion")
2. "Sacrificio del Alma" ("Soul Sacrifice") as the third track on side two (replacing "Everything's Coming Our Way")

In addition, the last two tracks on side two are reversed.

== Charts ==
=== Weekly charts ===
Chart (1974–1975)	Peak position
Australian Albums (Kent Music Report)	50
Austrian Albums (Ö3 Austria)	4
Canada Top Albums/CDs (RPM)	10
German Albums (Offizielle Top 100)	11
UK Albums (Official Charts)	14
US Billboard Top LPs & Tape	17
US Soul LPs (Billboard)	27

=== Year-end charts ===
Chart (1975)	Position
German Albums (Offizielle Top 100)	7

Chart (1976)	Position
(Offizielle Top 100)	5

Chart (1977)	Position
German Albums (Offizielle Top 100)	16

== Certifications and sales ==
Region	Certification	Certified units/sales
Canada (Music Canada)	Platinum	100,000^{^}
France (SNEP)	2× Gold	200,000^{*}
Germany (BVMI)	Platinum	500,000^{^}
United Kingdom (BPI)	Gold	170,000
United States (RIAA)	7× Platinum	7,000,000^{^}
Summaries
Europe	—	1,000,000
^{*} Sales figures based on certification alone.^{^} Shipments figures based on certification alone.
