= The Woodstock Experience =

2009 album box set featuring musicians from the 1969 Woodstock Festival

Live album by Santana, Janis Joplin, Sly and the Family Stone, Jefferson Airplane, Johnny Winter
- Released: June 30, 2009
- Recorded: August 15, 16 & 17, 1969 at Woodstock Festival, Bethel, NY
- Genres: Psychedelic rock; blues rock; soul
- Label: Sony BMG / Legacy
- Producer: Bob Irwin

Woodstock albums chronology
Woodstock 1999 (1999)	The Woodstock Experience (2009)	Woodstock 40 Years On: Back to Yasgur's Farm (2009)

Santana chronology
The Very Best of Santana – Live in 1968 (2007)	The Woodstock Experience (2009)	Guitar Heaven: The Greatest Guitar Classics of All Time (2010)

Janis Joplin chronology
The Lost Tapes (2008)	The Woodstock Experience (2009)	Playlist: The Very Best of Janis Joplin (2010)

Sly and the Family Stone chronology
Ain't But the One Way (1983)	The Woodstock Experience (2009)	Higher! (2013)

Jefferson Airplane chronology
Sweeping Up the Spotlight (2007)	The Woodstock Experience (2009)	Live at the Fillmore Auditorium 10/15/66 (2010)

Johnny Winter chronology
The Johnny Winter Anthology (2009)	The Woodstock Experience (2009)	Live Bootleg Series Vol. 5 (2009)

Professional ratings
Review scores
Source	Rating
Allmusic	3.5/5 stars
Allmusic (Santana)	4.5/5 stars
Allmusic (Janis Joplin)	3.5/5 stars
Allmusic (Sly & the Family Stone)	4/5 stars
Allmusic (Jefferson Airplane)	3.5/5 stars
Allmusic (Johnny Winter)	4.5/5 stars

The Woodstock Experience is a box consisting of a set of studio albums and live performances from the 1969 Woodstock Festival by the artists Santana, Janis Joplin, Sly and the Family Stone, Jefferson Airplane, and Johnny Winter. Each set consists of the 1969 studio album by the artist as well as each artist's entire Woodstock performance. The set was released as both a box containing all five artists (10-CD box set), and also as individual releases separated by artist, each containing the studio album and live performance of that artist (2 CDs per artist).

== Track listing ==
=== CD#1: Santana Studio ===
- Santana, Santana's debut studio album.

=== CD#2: Santana Live ===
All songs by Santana Band except where noted

1. "Waiting" – 4:49
2. "Evil Ways" (Sonny Henry, Jimmy Zack) – 4:00
3. "You Just Don't Care" – 4:46
4. "Savor" – 5:23
5. "Jingo" (Babatunde Olatunji) – 5:31
6. "Persuasion" – 2:52
7. "Soul Sacrifice" – 11:35
8. "Fried Neckbones and Some Home Fries" (Willie Bobo, Melvin Lastie) – 6:41

=== CD#3: Janis Joplin Studio ===
- I Got Dem Ol' Kozmic Blues Again Mama!, Janis Joplin's first solo studio album recorded after leaving her former band, Big Brother and the Holding Company.

=== CD#4: Janis Joplin Live ===
1. "Raise Your Hand" (Eddie Floyd, Steve Cropper, Alvertis Isbell) – 5:31
2. "As Good as You've Been to This World" (Nick Gravenites) – 6:25
3. "To Love Somebody" (Barry Gibb, Robin Gibb) – 5:16
4. "Summertime" (George Gershwin, Ira Gershwin, Dubose Heyward) – 5:05
5. "Try (Just a Little Bit Harder)" (Jerry Ragovoy, Chip Taylor) – 5:13
6. "Kozmic Blues" (Janis Joplin, Gabriel Mekler) – 4:56
7. "Can't Turn You Loose" (Otis Redding) – 4:25
8. "Work Me, Lord" (Gravenites) – 8:42
9. "Piece of My Heart" (Ragovoy, Bert Berns) – 4:57
10. "Ball and Chain" (Big Mama Thornton) – 7:42

=== CD#5: Sly & the Family Stone Studio ===
- Stand!, Sly & the Family Stone's fourth studio album.

=== CD#6: Sly & the Family Stone Live ===
All songs by Sylvester Stewart.

1. "M'Lady" – 7:46
2. "Sing a Simple Song" – 5:13
3. "You Can Make It If You Try" – 5:36
4. "Everyday People" – 3:15
5. "Dance to the Music" – 4:28
6. "Music Lover" / "Higher" – 7:50
7. "I Want to Take You Higher" – 6:43
8. "Love City" – 6:04
9. "Stand!" – 3:20

=== CD#7: Jefferson Airplane Studio ===
- Volunteers, Jefferson Airplane's 1969 studio album.

=== CD#8: Jefferson Airplane Live ===
1. "Introduction" – 0:23
2. "The Other Side of This Life" (Fred Neil) – 8:18
3. "Somebody to Love" (Darby Slick) – 4:31
4. "3/5 of a Mile in 10 Seconds" (Marty Balin) – 5:30
5. "Won't You Try / Saturday Afternoon" (Paul Kantner) – 5:06
6. "Eskimo Blue Day" (Grace Slick, Kantner) – 6:55
7. "Plastic Fantastic Lover" (Balin) – 4:35
8. "Wooden Ships" (David Crosby, Kantner, Stephen Stills) – 21:25
9. "Uncle Sam Blues" (Traditional, arranged by Jorma Kaukonen, Jack Casady) – 6:12
10. "Volunteers" (Balin, Kantner) – 3:16
11. "The Ballad of You & Me & Pooneil" (Kantner) – 15:29
12. "Come Back Baby" (Traditional, arranged by Kaukonen) – 6:05
13. "White Rabbit" (G. Slick) – 2:27
14. "The House at Pooneil Corners" (Balin, Kantner) – 9:17

=== CD#9: Johnny Winter Studio ===
- Johnny Winter, Johnny Winter's second studio album.

=== CD#10: Johnny Winter Live ===
1. "Mama, Talk to Your Daughter" (J. B. Lenoir) – 5:05
2. "Leland Mississippi Blues" (Johnny Winter) – 4:58
3. "Mean Town Blues" (Winter) – 10:54
4. "You Done Lost Your Good Thing Now" (B. B. King) – 14:45
5. "I Can't Stand It" (Bo Diddley) – 6:09
6. "Tobacco Road" (John D. Loudermilk) – 10:40
7. "Tell the Truth" (Lowman Pauling) – 6:51
8. "Johnny B. Goode" (Chuck Berry) – 5:36

== Personnel ==
=== Santana ===
- Carlos Santana – guitar, vocals
- Gregg Rolie – keyboards, vocals
- Dave Brown – bass
- Mike Carabello – percussion
- José "Chepitó" Areas – percussion, trumpet on "Fried Neckbones and Some Home Fries"
- Michael Shrieve – drums

=== Janis Joplin ===
- Janis Joplin – vocals
- John Till – guitar
- Richard Kermode – keyboards
- Brad Campbell – bass
- Maury Baker – drums
- Terry Clements – tenor saxophone
- Cornelius "Snooky" Flowers – baritone saxophone, vocals
- Luis Gasca – trumpet

=== Sly & the Family Stone ===
- Sly Stone – vocals, keyboards
- Freddie Stone – guitar, vocals
- Larry Graham – bass, vocals
- Rose Stone – keyboards, vocals
- Cynthia Robinson – trumpet, vocals
- Jerry Martini – saxophone
- Greg Errico – drums

=== Jefferson Airplane ===
- Marty Balin – percussion, vocals
- Grace Slick – vocals
- Jorma Kaukonen – lead guitar, vocals
- Paul Kantner – rhythm guitar, vocals
- Jack Casady – bass
- Spencer Dryden – drums
- Nicky Hopkins – piano

=== Johnny Winter ===
- Johnny Winter – guitar, vocals
- Tommy Shannon – bass
- Uncle John Turner – drums
- Edgar Winter – keyboards, saxophone, vocals
