= Live at the Fillmore 1968 =

Live album by Santana
- Released: March 11, 1997
- Recorded: December 19–22, 1968
- Venue: Fillmore West (San Francisco, CA)
- Length: 103:40
- Label: Columbia
- Producer: Bob Irwin, David Rubinson

Santana chronology
| Sacred Fire: Live in South America (1993) | Live at the Fillmore 1968 (1997) | Supernatural (1999) |

Live at the Fillmore 1968 is a two-CD live album by the rock band Santana. It was recorded at the Fillmore West in San Francisco from December 19 to 22, 1968 – eight months before their first album came out – and released in 1997.

== Critical reception ==
Professional ratings
Review scores
| Source | Rating |
|---|---|
| Allmusic | 4/5 stars |
| The Music Box | 5/5 stars |
| Uncut | 2/5 stars |

Live at the Fillmore 1968 received positive reviews.

Richie Unterberger wrote on AllMusic, "The band sound only a bit more tentative here than they would in their Woodstock-era incarnation... More interesting to collectors will be the five songs that have not previously appeared on any Santana recording... The sound is excellent and the arrangements a bit more improv-oriented than what ended up on the early studio records.... On its own terms it's a fine release, highlighted by some burning organ-guitar interplay in particular."

Douglas Payne said on All About Jazz, "Live at the Fillmore '68 is an outstanding and welcome glimpse into the exciting musical invention of one of rock's most musically creative groups, Santana. It also offers much for jazz listeners to appreciate.... But these are looser, less polished – and juicier – versions than Santana's better-known later performances of the same tunes.... This music is electric, exciting and exploratory."

John Metzger wrote in The Music Box, "It's full of the spiritual bliss and driving rhythms that faithful fans have come to expect from Santana's concerts....Throughout the nine tracks on Live at the Fillmore 1968, Santana churns out rhythms that melt into a symbiotic whole. The grooves coalesce into a wriggling mass of spiritual energy, upon which the guitarist works his divine powers.... It's an enchanting set that is a true testament to Santana's talent."

== Track listing ==
Disc one

1. "Jingo" (Babatunde Olatunji) – 9:38
2. "Persuasion" (Gregg Rolie) – 7:06
3. "Treat" (Carlos Santana, Rolie, Dave Brown) – 9:37
4. "Chunk a Funk" * (Santana, Rolie) – 5:58
5. "Fried Neckbones and Some Homefries" (Willie Bobo, Melvin Lastie) – 10:10
6. "Conquistadore Rides Again" * (Chico Hamilton) – 8:40

Disc two

1. "Soul Sacrifice" (Santana, Rolie, Marcus Malone, Brown) – 14:30
2. "As the Years Go Passing By" * (Deadric Malone) – 7:49
3. "Freeway" * (Santana, Rolie) – 30:15

The four tracks indicated with an asterisk have never been released as studio tracks.

== Personnel ==
Musicians

- Carlos Santana – guitar, vocals
- Gregg Rolie – organ, piano, vocals
- David Brown – bass
- Bob "Doc" Livingstone – drums
- Marcus Malone – congas

Production

- Produced for compact disc by Bob Irwin
- Recordings produced by David Rubinson
- Mixing, mastering: Vic Anesini
- Art direction: Cozbi Sanchez-Cabrera
- Graphic design: Rudy T. Zasloff
- Photography: Jim Marshall, Coni Night Loon Beeson
- Liner notes: Alan di Perna
- Album cover adapted from a concert poster by Wes Wilson
