= Drums of Passion =

Studio album by Babatunde Olatunji
- Released: February 15, 1960
- Recorded: New York City, August 14 and October 1, 1959
- Length: 39:11
- Label: Columbia
- Producer: Al Ham

Professional ratings
Review scores
Source	Rating
AllMusic	5/5 stars
Pitchfork	(8.2/10)

Drums of Passion is an album produced by Babatunde Olatunji, a percussionist from Nigeria, in 1960. It was the first recording to popularize African music in the West, becoming immensely successful and selling over five million copies. In 2002, it was released as a single layer stereo and 5.1 SACD by Columbia Records. In 2004 the album was added to the National Recording Registry.

== "Jin-go-lo-ba" ==
This was the most popular song on the album, and it sold millions of copies as a single. This simple exchange between the mother drum (iya ilu) and the baby drum omele became Babatunde's signature song.

"Jin-go-lo-ba" (or "Jingo") has been covered by Serge Gainsbourg, under the title "Marabout" and with no credit given to Olatunji, on his album Gainsbourg percussions (1964); by Santana on their first album Santana, (1969); by James Last on his album Voodoo-Party (1971); by Pierre Moerlen's Gong on the album Downwind (1979); by Candido Camero on his 1979 album Dancin' & Prancin' and by Fatboy Slim on his album Palookaville (2004).

== Track listing ==
1. "Akiwowo (Chant of the Trainman)" – 4:42
2. "Oya (Primitive Fire)" – 5:37
3. "Odun De! Odun De! (Happy New Year!)" – 4:59
4. "Jin-go-lo-ba (Drums of Passion)" – 3:25
5. "Kiyakiya (Why Do You Run Away?)" – 4:17
6. "Baba Jinde (Flirtation Dance)" – 5:33
7. "Oyin Momo Ado (Sweet as Honey)" – 5:27
8. "Shango (Chant to the God of Thunder)" – 7:06

The 2002 CD re-release of the album included a bonus track.

9. "Menu Di Ye Jewe (Who Is This?)" – 3:22

== Personnel ==
Credits are adapted from the album's liner notes.

Although the album featured songs and rhythms from Africa, all of the musicians, except Olatunji himself, were born and raised in the Americas. The Derby sisters, who formed the core of the group of dancers and drummers, were responsible for recruiting many of the original members of the group and thus played a key role in picking the personnel for this album.

- Baba Hawthorne Bey – drums
- Roger "Montego Joe" Sanders – drums
- Taiwo DuVall – drums
- Chinyelu Ajuluchuku – vocals and dance
- Ida Beebee Capps – vocals and dance
- Afuavi Derby – vocals and dance
- Akwasiba Derby – vocals and dance
- Helen Haynes – vocals and dance
- Dolores Oyinka Parker – vocals and dance
- Delzora Pearson – vocals and dance
- Ruby Wuraola Pryor – vocals and dance
- Barbara Gordon – vocals and dance
- Helena Walker – vocals and dance
- Louise Young – vocals and dance
- Al Ham – engineer
- Akin Akiwowo & Babatunde Olatunji – liner notes
