= The Very Best of Santana – Live in 1968 =

Live album by Santana
- Released: March 3 or 5, 2007
- Recorded: 1968
- Label: Mastersong

Santana chronology
All That I Am (2005)	The Very Best of Santana – Live in 1968 (2007)	The Woodstock Experience (2009)

Professional ratings
Review scores
Source	Rating

The Very Best of Santana – Live in 1968 is a (double CD) live album by Santana, recorded in 1968 and released in 2007 on the Mastersong (Australian) label.

== Track listing ==
=== Disc one ===
1. "Jingo" – (Babatunde Olatunji)
2. "Everyday I Have the Blues"
3. "La Puesta Del Sol"
4. "Hot Tamales"
5. "Acapulco Sunrise"
6. "Soul Sacrifice"
7. "With a Little Help from My Friends"
8. "Latin Tropical"
9. "Let's Get Ourselves Together"

=== Disc two ===
1. "Evil Ways"
2. "Persuasion" – (Gregg Rolie)
3. "As the Years Go By"
4. "Jam in E"
5. "Santana Jam"
6. "Travellin' Blues"
7. "El Corazón Manda"
8. "We've Got to Get Together/Jingo (Medley)"
9. "Rock Me"

== Personnel ==
- Carlos Santana – guitar, vocals
- Gregg Rolie : Keyboards, lead vocals
- David Brown : Bass
- Marcus Malone : Congas, percussion
- Bob ‘Doc’ Livingstone : Drums
