= Marcus Malone =

American percussionist (1944–2021)

- Born: July 29, 1944; Memphis, Tennessee, U.S.
- Died: October 12, 2021 (aged 77) Oakland, California, U.S.
- Genres: Latin rock, Chicano rock, psychedelic rock
- Instruments: Latin percussion and congas
- Years active: 1966–1969
- Label: Columbia

Marcus "The Magnificent" Malone (July 29, 1944 – October 12, 2021) was an American percussionist and a founding member of the Latin rock band Santana.

== Life and career ==
Malone was born in Memphis, Tennessee. The band Santana - originally known as the Santana Blues Band - was formed in 1966 in San Francisco with Malone as a percussionist specializing in Latin instruments. Guitarist Carlos Santana and bassist David Brown credited Malone with inspiring the band's early improvisational approach on tracks like "Jingo".

The group found little success in the music scene until it was slated to perform at the August 1969 Woodstock Music Festival and began work on its debut album, Santana. Malone is credited as co-writer of "Soul Sacrifice", which featured on the album and which the band performed at Woodstock. (This credit is obscured on the original album, which simply credits all the original songs as written by "Santana Band" and does not mention Malone's name anywhere.) By the time of the band's appearance, Malone had been convicted of manslaughter for stabbing a man, and was serving his sentence in San Quentin State Prison.

After his release from prison in 1973, Malone had been living on the streets of Oakland, where he was accidentally discovered by KRON-TV field reporter Stanley Roberts in December 2013. Malone and Carlos Santana subsequently had an emotional reunion and Malone was set to play as a percussionist on the band's upcoming album Santana IV. Though they did meet to rehearse, Malone did not appear on the album. Santana said, "I could tell he hadn't played in years. He didn't have the strength or stamina."

On June 18, 2016, Malone was critically injured by an unsecured tire that flew off a passing car in Oakland and knocked him backwards onto the sidewalk. He was placed on life support at Oakland's Highland Hospital. A crowdfunding GoFundMe page for his medical expenses was set up by his personal manager and nephew, Carl Jacobs. Malone was transferred to a skilled nursing facility in Alameda, California.

Malone died on October 12, 2021, at the age of 77.

== Albums ==
=== With Santana ===
- Live at the Fillmore 1968 (1997) (Label : Columbia)
- The Very Best of Santana – Live in 1968 (2007) (Label : Mastersong – Australian import)
