= Abraxas Pool =

Studio album by Abraxas Pool
- Released: March 25, 1997
- Recorded: Gush Studios, Oakland, California
- Length: 56:13
- Label: Miramar
- Producer: Abraxas Pool

Professional ratings
Review scores
Source	Rating
Allmusic	3/5 stars

Abraxas Pool is a 1997 album by ex-Santana members Mike Shrieve, Neal Schon, Gregg Rolie, José "Chepito" Areas, Alphonso Johnson, and Mike Carabello.

== Track listing ==
1. "Boom Ba Ya Ya" (Michael Shrieve, Gregg Rolie, Neal Schon, Michael Carabello) - 6:44
2. "A Million Miles Away" (Shrieve, Rolie, Schon) - 3:49
3. "Baila Mi Cha-Cha" (José Areas) - 5:07
4. "Waiting for You" (Rolie, Shrieve) - 5:08
5. "Going Home" (Rolie) - 3:25
6. "Szabo" (Schon, Shrieve) - 7:54
7. "Guajirona" (J. Areas) - 3:05
8. "Cruzin'" (Rolie) - 3:52
9. "Don't Give Up" (Rolie, Schon, Shrieve) - 7:12
10. "Ya Llego" (J. Areas, Carabello, Adrian Areas) - 2:48
11. "Jingo" (Michael Olatunji) - 7:09

== Personnel ==
Band members

- Gregg Rolie - vocals and keyboards
- Neal Schon - guitars
- Alphonso Johnson - bass
- Michael Shrieve - drums
- Michael Carabello - congas
- José Areas - timbales

Additional musicians

- Carlos E. Franco, Necia Dallas, Davona Bundy - vocals on "Ya Llego"
- Wole Alade, Ronald Marshall - additional drums on "Jingo"

Production

- Scott Boorey, Michael Rosen - engineers
- Robert Alan Craft - assistant engineer
- Tom Size - mixing
- Robb Davidson - editing
- Mark Guenther - mastering
