= Sacred Fire: Live in South America =

Live album by Santana
- Released: November 2, 1993
- Recorded: May 22–23, 1993
- Venue: Palacio de los Deportes (Mexico City, Mexico)
- Genre: Latin rock; Chicano rock; jazz rock
- Length: 77:19
- Label: Polydor
- Producer: Carlos Santana, Chester Thompson

Santana chronology
Milagro (1992)	Sacred Fire: Live in South America (1993)	Live at the Fillmore 1968 (1997)

Professional ratings
Review scores
Source	Rating
AllMusic	2/5 stars

Sacred Fire: Live in South America is an album by Santana, released in 1993. This album is dedicated to the life of Cesar Chavez. The title, "Live in South America", is not correct, as the location of the concert production, Mexico City, is not located on the continent of South America.

There is also a video of this album, by the similar name of Sacred Fire: Live in Mexico, featuring additional songs not featured on the album. Produced by Paul Flattery and directed by Peter Nydrle. As well as the concert, the video features shots of Carlos playing guitar at various historic sites around Mexico City.

The album peaked at 181 on the Billboard 200.

== Track listing ==
1. "Angels All Around Us" (Sanders) – 1:57
2. "Vive la Vida (Life Is for Living)" (Sefolosha) – 4:18
3. "Esperando" (Santana, Thompson, Perazzo, Charles) – 5:58
4. "No One to Depend On" (Carabello, Escovedo, Rolie) – 4:38
5. "Black Magic Woman / Gypsy Queen" (Green/Szabo) – 8:53
6. "Oye Como Va" (Puente) – 5:07
7. "Samba Pa Ti" (Santana) – 6:49
8. "Guajira" (Brown, Areas, Reyes) – 6:13
9. "Make Somebody Happy" (Santana, Ligertwood) – 7:14
10. "Toussaint l'Overture" (Santana, Areas, Brown, Carabello, Rolie, Schon, Shrieve) – 6:52
11. "Soul Sacrifice / Don't Try This at Home" (Santana, Areas, Brown, Carabello, Rolie, Schon, Shrieve/Perazzo, Rekow) – 7:26
12. "Europa (Earth's Cry Heaven's Smile)" (Santana, Coster) – 6:11
13. "Jin-Go-Lo-Ba" (Olatunji) – 5:43

A bonus disc with 3 additional tracks ("Spirits Dancing in the Flesh", "Wings of Grace", "Get It in Your Soul") were included in a limited edition Japanese re-release.

== Personnel ==
- Alex Ligertwood – vocals
- Vorriece Cooper – vocals, percussion
- Carlos Santana – guitars, vocals
- Jorge Santana – guitars, vocals
- Chester Thompson – organ, keyboards, vocals
- Myron Dove – bass guitar, vocals
- Walfredo Reyes Jr. – drums
- Karl Perazzo – percussion, conga, timbales, vocals
- Raul Rekow – percussion, conga, vocals

== Charts ==
Chart (1993)	Peak position
Australian Albums (ARIA)	142
French Albums (SNEP)	23
US Billboard 200	181

== Certifications ==
CD

Region	Certification	Certified units/sales
Argentina (CAPIF)	Gold	30,000^{^}
^{^} Shipments figures based on certification alone.

DVD

Region	Certification	Certified units/sales
Argentina (CAPIF)	Platinum	8,000^{^}
United States (RIAA)	Platinum	100,000^{^}
^{^} Shipments figures based on certification alone.
