= Samba Pa Ti =

Instrumental track by Santana

"Samba pa ti"

Single by Santana

from the album Abraxas
- B-side: "Se Acabó"
- Released: 1973 (single)
- Recorded: 1970
- Studio: Wally Heider Studios (San Francisco, California)
- Genre: Latin rock; instrumental rock; jazz rock
- Length: 4:45
- Label: Columbia
- Songwriter: Carlos Santana
- Producers: Fred Catero; Carlos Santana

Santana singles chronology
"No One to Depend On" (1972)	"Samba pa ti" (1973)	"Song of the Wind" (1974)

"Samba Pa Ti" is an instrumental by Latin rock band Santana, from their 1970 album, Abraxas. In English, the title means "Samba for you". It was released as a single in 1973. The song charted at No. 11 in the Netherlands, No. 43 on the German charts, and No. 27 on the UK Singles Chart, Santana's first single to chart in the United Kingdom.

The song was written by Carlos Santana after he witnessed a jazz saxophonist playing in the street outside his apartment. In 2008, Santana told Mojo that "Samba Pa Ti" was the first song he felt he could call his own.

""Samba Pa Ti" was conceived in New York City on a Sunday afternoon,"..."I opened the window I saw this man in the street, he was drunk and he had a saxophone and a bottle of booze in his back pocket. And I kept looking at him because he kept struggling with himself. He couldn’t make up his mind which one to put in his mouth first, the saxophone or the bottle and I immediately heard a song"..."I wrote the whole thing right there"—Carlos Santana

"Samba Pa Ti" is one of the group's most popular and acclaimed songs, and it is still in the band's tour set lists.

In 1974 the song was covered by Bruno Battisti D'Amario and Edda Dell'Orso for the album Samba para ti. Japanese guitarist Masayoshi Takanaka covered the song on his 1978 release, "On Guitar." It was later covered by José Feliciano with added lyrics on his 1982 album Escenas de Amor, by Ottmar Liebert on his 1992 album Solo para ti, by Gato Barbieri on the Fania All Stars 1981 album Social Change, and also by Angélique Kidjo, who put lyrics in Yoruba on her album Õÿö. It is also one of the tracks featured in Nick Hornby's book, Songbook.

== Personnel ==
- Carlos Santana – electric guitar, composer, producer
- David Brown – bass guitar
- Gregg Rolie – Hammond organ
- Michael Carabello – congas
- José Areas – timbales
- Michael Shrieve – drums

== Charts ==
Chart (1973–1974)	Peak position
Netherlands (Dutch Top 40)	11
Netherlands (Single Top 100)	11
UK Singles (OCC)	27
West Germany (GfK)	43
