= Lee Conklin =

Lee Conklin is an artist best known for his psychedelic poster art of the late 1960s, and his iconic album cover for Santana's debut album.

Conklin was born in Englewood Cliffs, New Jersey in 1941 and graduated from Spring Valley High School in New York in 1959. He attended Calvin College in Grand Rapids, Michigan. He worked as a cartoonist for the college newspaper. He was married in 1965. He served in the United States Army and was stationed in South Korea as a cook, where he painted murals on mess halls. He was discharged from the Army in May 1967. He moved to San Francisco began creating concert posters for the growing music scene from 1968 to 1970. He moved to New York in 1972, working at various jobs to support his family. Conklin returned to creating art full-time in 1990. He currently lives in Central California with his wife.

== Works ==
He has created numerous posters for the band Moonalice.
