= David Brown (American musician) =

American bassist (1947–2000)

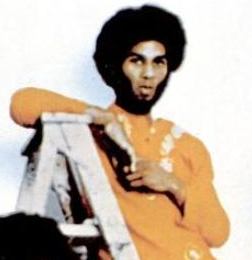
- Brown in 1971

Background information
- Born: February 15, 1947; New York City, U.S.
- Origin: San Francisco, California, U.S.
- Died: September 4, 2000 (aged 53)
- Genres: Rock, jazz fusion
- Occupations: Bassist
- Years active: 1966–2000
- Formerly of: Santana, Boz Scaggs

David Brown (February 15, 1947 – September 4, 2000) was an American musician. He was the bass player for the band Santana from 1967 until 1971, then again from 1974 until 1976. Brown played in Santana at Woodstock and at Altamont in 1969 and on the band's first three studio albums before leaving after the "Closing of the Fillmore West" gig on July 4, 1971. In 1974, he rejoined for the album Borboletta and remained with the band for the follow-up Amigos before leaving again in the spring of 1976. In 1998, Brown was inducted into the Rock and Roll Hall of Fame as a member of Santana.

== Early life ==
Brown was born February 15, 1947 to an African-American family in New York City. His father was a Baptist preacher. The family moved to Bayview–Hunters Point, San Francisco, where Brown was raised with Sly Stone as his neighbor. He sang and played bass in church. Rock organist Billy Preston was his second cousin. Brown formed a doo-wop group when he was 14, and played bass with touring bands such as the Four Tops when they gigged in San Francisco.

Brown was athletic: he was a high jump champion in high school, he was an archer, and he earned a second-degree black belt in karate. He enjoyed riding his Harley-Davidson motorcycle, and participated in Hells Angels rides in the San Francisco Bay Area.

== Santana ==
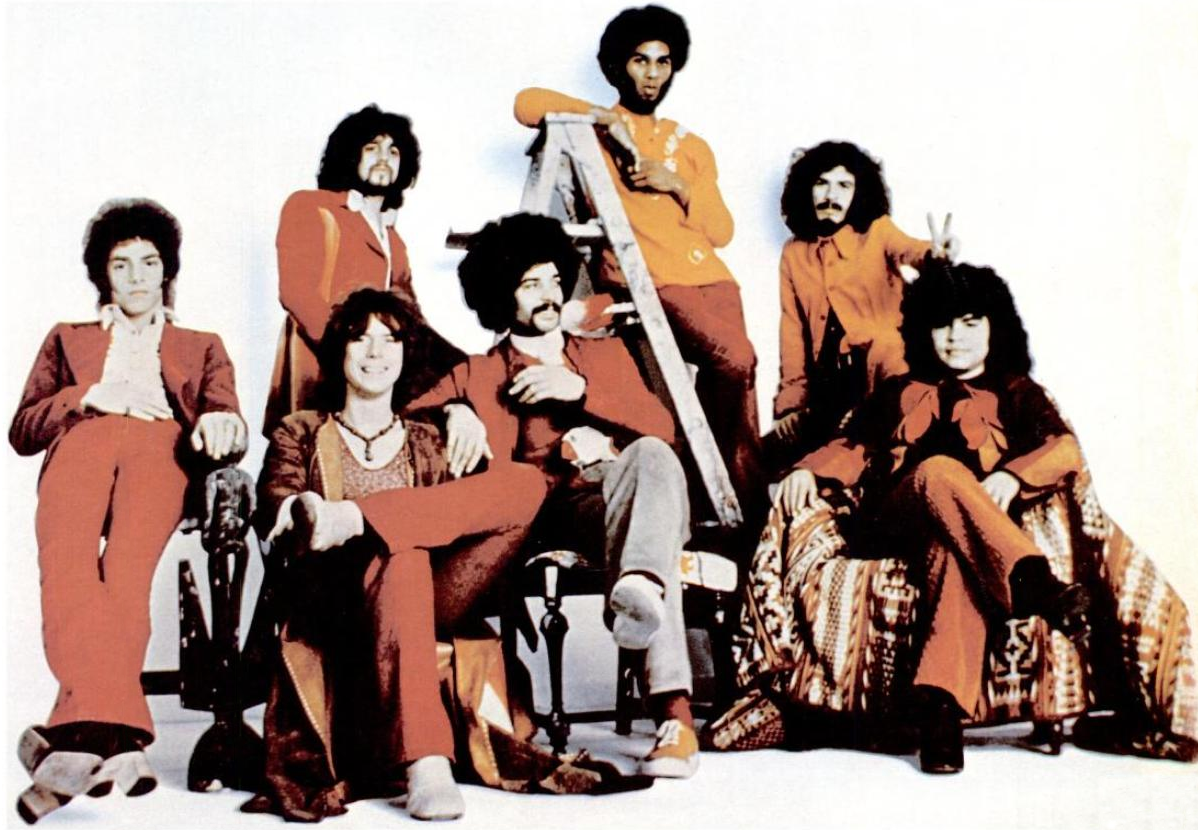
Santana in 1971. Left to right: Neal Schon, Gregg Rolie, Michael Shrieve, Michael Carabello, David Brown, Carlos Santana, José "Chepito" Areas

Brown was discovered in San Francisco by Santana's manager, Stan Marcum, who invited him to join the band in late '66 or '67. Brown was not the first bass player but was an early member of the band, and helped expand Santana's musical style in the direction of Latin jazz fusion that bandleader Carlos Santana wished to go. Brown later said, "We didn't like the music too repetitious, the way Butterfield and other blues bands were playing... So we got into improvisation and we'd find the drums in there more of the time. Eventually we just sat back and decided to let them do their thing." Musicologist Maury Dean praised Brown's bass playing on the band's hit single "Black Magic Woman": "David Brown cushions the low rhythms on a jazz-riff bass; he circles the beat like Ella Fitzgerald, rather than pounce on it."

After the band played larger concerts in 1970, Brown became less reliable because of his growing drug habit. He was arrested several times on drug charges and served short jail sentences. In early 1971, Santana brought bassist Doug Rauch on tour in Europe as an understudy for the increasingly erratic Brown, and by the end of the year Rauch had replaced him. After Santana, Brown played as an occasional session musician. He died September 4, 2000 of liver and kidney failure.

== Discography ==
=== With Santana ===
==== Studio albums ====
Album	Album details
Santana	Released: August 30, 1969; Label: Columbia; Format: LP, CD
Abraxas	Released: September 23, 1970; Label: Columbia; Format: LP, CD, CC
Santana III	Released: September 1971; Label: Columbia; Format: LP, CD
Borboletta	Released: October 1974; Label: CBS; Format: LP, CD
Amigos	Released: March 26, 1976; Label: Columbia; Format: LP, CD

==== Singles ====
Single	Year
"Jingo"	1969
"Evil Ways"	1969
"Soul Sacrifice"	1970
"Black Magic Woman"	1970
"Oye Cómo Va"	1971
"Hope You're Feeling Better"	1971
"Everybody's Everything"	1971
