= Guitar Heaven: The Greatest Guitar Classics of All Time =

Studio album by Santana
- Released: September 21, 2010
- Genre: Hard rock; blues rock; heavy metal; alternative rock; latin rock; psychedelic rock
- Length: 54:54; 1:04:08 (deluxe edition)
- Label: Arista
- Producer: Carlos Santana, Clive Davis, Matt Serletic and Howard Benson

Santana chronology
| The Woodstock Experience (2009) | Guitar Heaven: The Greatest Guitar Classics of All Time (2010) | Shape Shifter (2012) |

Singles from Guitar Heaven
- 1. "While My Guitar Gently Weeps" Released: August 24, 2010; 2. "Photograph" Released: September 21, 2010; 3. "Fortunate Son" Released: October 30, 2010; 4. "Under the Bridge" Released: November 18, 2010; 5. "Dance the Night Away" Released: December 24, 2010; 6. "Sunshine of Your Love" Released: January 23, 2011; 7. "Smoke On the Water" Released: 2011

Professional ratings
Aggregate scores
| Source | Rating |
|---|---|
| Metacritic | 45/100 |
Review scores
| Source | Rating |
| AllMusic | 1.5/5 stars |
| American Songwriter | 2.5/5 stars |
| BBC Music | (mixed) |
| musicOMH | 2/5 stars |
| The New York Times | (mixed) |
| PopMatters | 7/10 stars |
| Rolling Stone | 3/5 stars |
| Uncut | 2/5 stars |
| USA Today | 1/4 stars |

Guitar Heaven: The Greatest Guitar Classics of All Time, referred to as simply Guitar Heaven, is the twenty-first studio album by Santana, released on September 21, 2010. It is a classic rock covers album and features guest performances by several popular vocalists, including India.Arie, Joe Cocker, Chris Cornell of Soundgarden and Audioslave, Scott Stapp of Creed and Art of Anarchy, Scott Weiland of Stone Temple Pilots, Velvet Revolver and Art of Anarchy, Chris Daughtry of Daughtry, Jacoby Shaddix of Papa Roach, Chester Bennington of Linkin Park, Dead By Sunrise and Stone Temple Pilots, Rob Thomas of Matchbox Twenty, Pat Monahan of Train and rapper Nas.

The album was certified gold by the Federation of the Italian Music Industry.

== Singles ==
The first single released from the album is the cover of Def Leppard's "Photograph" which featured Chris Daughtry peaked at number 14 on the US Bubbling Under Hot 100. The last single released from the album was the cover of The Beatles' "While My Guitar Gently Weeps" which featured India.Arie and Yo-Yo Ma and "Fortunate Son" with Scott Stapp, "Under the Bridge" with Andy Vargas, "Dance the Night Away" with Pat Monahan, "Sunshine of Your Love" with Rob Thomas and "Smoke On the Water" with Jacoby Shaddix was released as a Promotional Singles.

== Commercial performance ==
In his home country of United States, the album debuted at number 5 on the Billboard 200, selling 66,000 copies in its first week.

== Track listing ==
| No. | Title | Writer(s) | Original Artist | Length |
|---|---|---|---|---|
| 1. | "Whole Lotta Love" (feat. Chris Cornell) | John Bonham, John Paul Jones, Jimmy Page, Robert Plant, Willie Dixon | Led Zeppelin | 3:51 |
| 2. | "Can't You Hear Me Knocking" (feat. Scott Weiland) | Mick Jagger, Keith Richards | The Rolling Stones | 5:38 |
| 3. | "Sunshine of Your Love" (feat. Rob Thomas) | Pete Brown, Jack Bruce, Eric Clapton | Cream | 4:43 |
| 4. | "While My Guitar Gently Weeps" (feat. India Arie & Yo-Yo Ma) | George Harrison | The Beatles | 6:02 |
| 5. | "Photograph" (feat. Chris Daughtry) | Joe Elliott, Pete Willis, Steve Clark, Rick Savage, Robert John "Mutt" Lange | Def Leppard | 4:04 |
| 6. | "Back in Black" (feat. Nas) | Angus Young, Malcolm Young, Brian Johnson | AC/DC | 4:20 |
| 7. | "Riders on the Storm" (feat. Chester Bennington & Ray Manzarek) | Jim Morrison, Robby Krieger, Ray Manzarek, John Densmore | The Doors | 5:23 |
| 8. | "Smoke on the Water" (feat. Jacoby Shaddix) | Ritchie Blackmore, Ian Gillan, Roger Glover, Jon Lord, Ian Paice | Deep Purple | 5:06 |
| 9. | "Dance the Night Away" (feat. Pat Monahan) | Edward Van Halen, Alex Van Halen, Michael Anthony, David Lee Roth | Van Halen | 3:23 |
| 10. | "Bang a Gong (Get It On)" (feat. Gavin Rossdale) | Marc Bolan | T. Rex | 3:41 |
| 11. | "Little Wing" (feat. Joe Cocker) | Jimi Hendrix | The Jimi Hendrix Experience | 4:52 |
| 12. | "I Ain't Superstitious" (feat. Jonny Lang) | Willie Dixon | Howlin' Wolf | 3:56 |
| Total length: | | | | 54:54 |

Deluxe Edition
| No. | Title | Writer(s) | Original Artist | Length |
|---|---|---|---|---|
| 13. | "Fortunate Son" (feat. Scott Stapp) | John Fogerty | Creedence Clearwater Revival | 3:45 |
| 14. | "Under the Bridge" (feat. Andy Vargas) | Michael Balzary, John Frusciante, Anthony Kiedis, Chad Smith | Red Hot Chili Peppers | 5:09 |
| Total length: | | | | 1:04:08 |

Europe Deluxe Edition
| No. | Title | Writer(s) | Original Artist | Length |
|---|---|---|---|---|
| 14. | "Under the Bridge" (feat. Roch Voisine) | Balzary, Frusciante, Kiedis, Smith | Red Hot Chili Peppers | 5:09 |

Japan Edition
| No. | Title | Writer(s) | Original Artist | Length |
|---|---|---|---|---|
| 14. | "La Grange" (feat. Kenichi Asai) | Billy Gibbons, Dusty Hill, Frank Beard | ZZ Top |

== Personnel ==
- Carlos Santana – lead guitar
- Tommy Anthony – rhythm guitar
- Benny Rietveld – bass guitar
- Freddie Ravel – keyboards
- Bill Ortiz – trumpet
- Jeff Cressman – trombone
- Dennis Chambers – drums
- Karl Perazzo – timbales
- Raul Rekow – congas
- Andy Vargas – background vocals
- Marc VanGool – rhythm guitar

Production

- Produced by Carlos Santana and Clive Davis
- Tracks produced by Matt Serletic and Howard Benson

== Charts ==
=== Weekly charts ===
| Chart (2010) | Peak position |
|---|---|
| Australian Albums (ARIA) | 5 |
| Austrian Albums (Ö3 Austria) | 5 |
| Belgian Albums (Ultratop Flanders) | 17 |
| Belgian Albums (Ultratop Wallonia) | 7 |
| Canadian Albums (Billboard) | 3 |
| Danish Albums (Hitlisten) | 27 |
| Dutch Albums (Album Top 100) | 24 |
| Finnish Albums (Suomen virallinen lista) | 12 |
| French Albums (SNEP) | 9 |
| German Albums (Offizielle Top 100) | 10 |
| Hungarian Albums (MAHASZ) | 2 |
| Irish Albums (IRMA) | 29 |
| Italian Albums (FIMI) | 3 |
| Japanese Albums (Oricon) | 11 |
| Mexican Albums (Top 100 Mexico) | 8 |
| New Zealand Albums (RMNZ) | 2 |
| Norwegian Albums (VG-lista) | 9 |
| Polish Albums (ZPAV) | 1 |
| Portuguese Albums (AFP) | 3 |
| Scottish Albums (OCC) | 16 |
| Spanish Albums (Promusicae) | 12 |
| Swedish Albums (Sverigetopplistan) | 17 |
| Swiss Albums (Schweizer Hitparade) | 5 |
| UK Albums (OCC) | 15 |
| US Billboard 200 | 5 |
| US Digital Albums (Billboard) | 4 |
| US Top Rock Albums (Billboard) | 2 |
| US Indie Store Album Sales (Billboard) | 2 |

=== Year-end charts ===
| Chart (2010) | Peak position |
|---|---|
| Australian Albums (ARIA) | 73 |
| Hungarian Albums (MAHASZ) | 65 |
| US Billboard 200 | 187 |

== Certifications ==
| Region | Certification | Certified units/sales |
|---|---|---|
| Australia (ARIA) | Gold | 35,000^{^} |
| Croatia (HDU) | Gold | |
| France (SNEP) | Gold | 50,000^{*} |
| Hungary (MAHASZ) | Gold | 3,000^{^} |
| Italy (FIMI) | Gold | 30,000^{*} |
| Mexico (AMPROFON) | Gold | 30,000^{^} |
| Poland (ZPAV) | Platinum | 20,000^{*} |
| Portugal (AFP) | Platinum | 20,000^{^} |
| Sweden (GLF) | Gold | 20,000^{‡} |
^{*} Sales figures based on certification alone.^{^} Shipments figures based on certification alone.^{‡} Sales+streaming figures based on certification alone.
