= Shape Shifter (album) =

- Cover art by Rance Hood

Studio album by Santana
- Released: May 14, 2012
- Genre: Latin rock
- Length: 57:22
- Labels: Starfaith, Sony Music
- Producers: Carlos Santana, Eric Bazilian, Walter Afanasieff

Santana chronology
| Guitar Heaven: The Greatest Guitar Classics of All Time (2010) | Shape Shifter (2012) | Corazón (2014) |

Professional ratings
Aggregate scores
| Source | Rating |
|---|---|
| Metacritic | 45/100 |
Review scores
| Source | Rating |
| All About Jazz | 3.5/5 stars |
| AllMusic | 3/5 stars |
| American Songwriter | 2.5/5 stars |
| Classic Rock | 6/10 |
| Mojo | 3/5 stars |
| PopMatters | 2/10 |
| Record Collector | 3/5 stars |
| Rolling Stone | 2.5/5 stars |
| Sputnikmusic | 3.5/5 |
| Uncut | 4/10 |

Shape Shifter is the twenty-second studio album (thirty-sixth album overall) by Santana. It was released on May 14, 2012. This album is the first from his new record label Starfaith Records, which is distributed by Sony Music Entertainment, the owners of all of Santana's albums (except those recorded for Polydor Records, which are owned by Universal Music Group). It is also the first album since 1992's Milagro that does not feature guest singers in any of the songs, a style that characterized Santana's albums since Supernatural. The album contains only one song with vocals ("Eres La Luz"). The track "Mr. Szabo" is an homage to the Hungarian guitarist Gábor Szabó, one of Carlos Santana's early idols, who released a series of 8 albums for Impulse Records between 1966 and 1967; the track features a similar rhythmical and harmonic structure to "Gypsy Queen", a Szabó recording from 1966 covered by Santana in 1970 as a medley with Fleetwood Mac's "Black Magic Woman".

== Track listing ==
All tracks were written by Carlos Santana, except where noted.

| No. | Title | Writer(s) | Length |
|---|---|---|---|
| 1. | "Shape Shifter" | | 6:16 |
| 2. | "Dom" | Hamidou Touré, Ousmane Touré, Ismaila Touré, Tidiane Sixu Touré | 3:51 |
| 3. | "Nomad" | | 4:49 |
| 4. | "Metatron" | | 2:39 |
| 5. | "Angelica Faith" | C. Santana, Chester Thompson | 5:03 |
| 6. | "Never the Same Again" | C. Santana, Eric Bazilian | 5:01 |
| 7. | "In the Light of a New Day" | C. Santana, Narada Michael Walden | 5:06 |
| 8. | "Spark of the Divine" | | 1:03 |
| 9. | "Macumba in Budapest" | C. Santana, Walter Afanasieff | 4:01 |
| 10. | "Mr. Szabo" | | 6:20 |
| 11. | "Eres La Luz" | C. Santana, Afanasieff, Andy Vargas, Karl Perazzo | 4:51 |
| 12. | "Canela" | C. Santana, Salvador Santana | 5:22 |
| 13. | "Ah, Sweet Dancer" | Micheal O Suilleabhain | 3:08 |
| Total length: | | | 57:22 |

== Personnel ==
- Andy Vargas and Tony Lindsay – vocals (track 11)
- Carlos Santana – guitar
- Chester Thompson – keyboards
- Salvador Santana – keyboards
- Benny Rietveld – bass
- Dennis Chambers – drums
- Karl Perazzo – timbales, percussion
- Raul Rekow – congas, bongos, percussion
- Carlos Hernandez & Jorge Santana – additional guitars on track 3 "Nomad"

== Charts ==
=== Weekly charts ===
| Chart (2012) | Peak position |
|---|---|
| Austrian Albums (Ö3 Austria) | 29 |
| Belgian Albums (Ultratop Flanders) | 82 |
| Belgian Albums (Ultratop Wallonia) | 27 |
| Dutch Albums (Album Top 100) | 63 |
| French Albums (SNEP) | 71 |
| German Albums (Offizielle Top 100) | 19 |
| Hungarian Albums (MAHASZ) | 2 |
| Italian Albums (FIMI) | 19 |
| Japanese Albums (Oricon) | 48 |
| Scottish Albums (Official Charts) | 49 |
| Spanish Albums (Promusicae) | 75 |
| Swiss Albums (Schweizer Hitparade) | 8 |
| UK Albums (Official Charts) | 49 |
| US Billboard 200 | 16 |
| US Independent Albums (Billboard) | 2 |
| US Top Rock Albums (Billboard) | 6 |
| US Indie Store Album Sales (Billboard) | 5 |

=== Year-end charts ===
| Chart (2012) | Position |
|---|---|
| Hungarian Albums (MAHASZ) | 69 |
