= Santana (1971 album) =

Santana III

Studio album by Santana
- Released: September 24, 1971
- Recorded: January – July 4, 1971
- Studios: Columbia Studios, San Francisco
- Genres: Latin rock; Chicano rock; psychedelic rock; jazz fusion
- Length: 41:27
- Labels: Columbia; Legacy (2006 edition)
- Producer: Santana

Santana chronology
Abraxas (1970)	Santana III (1971)	Caravanserai (1972)

Singles from Santana III
- 1. "Everybody's Everything" Released: September 27, 1971; 2. "No One to Depend On" Released: January 12, 1972

Santana is the third studio album by the American rock band Santana, released on September 24, 1971, by Columbia Records. The band's second self-titled album, it is often referred to as III or Santana III to distinguish it from the band's 1969 debut album. The album is also known as Man with an Outstretched Hand after its album cover image, a reverse variation of an Arthur Lidov painting which was featured in the 28 June 1963 issue of LIFE. It was the third and last album by the Woodstock-era lineup, until their reunion on Santana IV in 2016. It was also considered by many to be the band's peak commercially and musically, as subsequent releases aimed towards more experimental jazz fusion and Latin music. The album also marked the addition of 16-year-old guitarist Neal Schon to the group.

== Release and reception ==
The original album was recorded at Columbia Studios, San Francisco, and released in both stereo and quadraphonic.

The album featured two singles that charted in the United States. "Everybody's Everything" peaked at No. 12 in October 1971, while "No One to Depend On", an uncredited adaptation of Willie Bobo's boogaloo standard "Spanish Grease", received significant airplay on FM radio and peaked at No. 36 in March 1972. Santana III was also the last Santana album to hit #1 on the charts until Supernatural in 1999. The 2005 edition of Guinness World Records stated that was the longest gap between #1 albums ever occurring (a record which is now held by Paul McCartney since his seventeenth solo studio album, Egypt Station, topped the Billboard 200 chart on 2018, his first since his 1982's Tug of War). Santana III was re-released in 1998 with live versions of "Batuka", "Jungle Strut" and a previously unreleased song, "Gumbo", recorded at Fillmore West in 1971 which features lead guitar solos by both Santana and Schon.

As was done with the band's debut album, released two years earlier, in 2006 Sony released the "Legacy Edition" of the album, featuring the original album in re-mastered sound, and bonus material:

- Three other songs recorded in the sessions for the album
- The single version of "No One to Depend On"
- The complete 1971 Fillmore West concert (from which the 1998 bonus tracks were taken)

The original Quadraphonic mix of the album was remastered and released on multichannel SACD by Sony Japan in 2021.

Professional ratings
Review scores
Source	Rating
AllMusic	4.5/5 stars
Christgau's Record Guide	B
Rolling Stone	(favorable)
The Rolling Stone Album Guide	4/5 stars
The Daily Vault	B+
Encyclopedia of Popular Music	4/5 stars

== Track listing ==
=== Standard edition ===
Side one
No.	Title	Writer(s)	Length
1.	"Batuka"	José Areas, David Brown, Michael Carabello, Gregg Rolie, Michael Shrieve	3:35
2.	"No One to Depend On"	Carabello, Rolie, Coke Escovedo	5:31
3.	"Taboo"	Areas, Rolie	5:34
4.	"Toussaint L'Overture"	Areas, D. Brown, Carabello, Rolie, Shrieve, Carlos Santana	5:56

Side two
No.	Title	Writer(s)	Length
5.	"Everybody's Everything"	Santana, Milton Brown, Tyrone Moss	3:31
6.	"Guajira"	Areas, D. Brown, Rico Reyes	5:43
7.	"Jungle Strut"	Gene Ammons	5:20
8.	"Everything's Coming Our Way"	Carlos Santana	3:15
9.	"Para los Rumberos"	Tito Puente	2:47
Total length:			41:27

1998 reissue bonus tracks – live at the Fillmore West, San Francisco, California, July 4, 1971
No.	Title	Writer(s)	Length
10.	"Batuka"		3:41
11.	"Jungle Strut"		5:59
12.	"Gumbo"	Santana, Rolie	5:26

=== 2006 Legacy Edition ===
Disc one – Original Santana III
No.	Title	Length
1.	"Batuka"	3:35
2.	"No One to Depend On"	5:31
3.	"Taboo"	5:34
4.	"Toussaint L'Overture"	5:56
5.	"Everybody's Everything"	3:31
6.	"Guajira"	5:43
7.	"Jungle Strut"	5:20
8.	"Everything's Coming Our Way"	3:15
9.	"Para los Rumberos"	2:47

Bonus tracks
No.	Title	Length
10.	"Gumbo" (previously unissued studio recording)	4:24
11.	"Folsom Street – One" (previously unissued studio recording)	7:08
12.	"Banbeye" (previously unissued studio recording)	10:21
13.	"No One to Depend On" (single version)	3:13

Disc two – Live at the Fillmore West, San Francisco, California, July 4, 1971
No.	Title	Writer(s)	Length
1.	"Batuka"		3:47
2.	"No One to Depend On"		5:29
3.	"Toussaint L'Overture"		6:10
4.	"Taboo"		5:10
5.	"Jungle Strut"		5:49
6.	"Black Magic Woman / Gypsy Queen"	Peter Green, Gábor Szabó	6:15
7.	"Incident at Neshabur"		5:28
8.	"In a Silent Way"	Joe Zawinul, Miles Davis	6:55
9.	"Savor"		3:35
10.	"Para los Rumberos"		3:41
11.	"Gumbo"		5:26

- Tracks 2–4, 6, 9, 10: previously unissued
- Tracks 1, 5, 11: from the 1998 reissue of Santana III (see above)
- Tracks 7–8: previously released on the album Fillmore: The Last Days (recorded June 29 – July 4, 1971, released in 1972, containing performances by 14 different bands)

== Singles ==
- 1971 - "Everybody's Everything" (#3 Canada)
- 1972 - "No One to Depend On" (#17 Canada)

== Personnel ==
- Gregg Rolie – lead vocals, keyboards, piano, producer
- Carlos Santana – guitar, backing vocals, lead vocals on "Everything's Coming Our Way", producer
- Neal Schon – guitar, producer
- David Brown – bass, producer, engineer
- Michael Shrieve – drums, percussion, producer
- José "Chepito" Areas – percussion, conga, timbales, drums, producer
- Mike Carabello – percussion, conga, tambourine, vocals, producer

=== Additional personnel ===
- Rico Reyes – percussion, backing vocals, lead vocals on "Guajira"
- Thomas "Coke" Escovedo – percussion, backing vocals
- Luis Gasca – trumpet on "Para los Rumberos"
- Mario Ochoa – piano solo on "Guajira"
- The Tower of Power Horns – horn section on "Everybody's Everything"
- Linda Tillery – backing vocals
- Greg Errico – tambourine
- John Fiore – engineer

== Charts ==
=== Weekly charts ===
Chart (1971–1972)	Peak position
Australian Albums (Kent Music Report)	4
Canada Top Albums/CDs (RPM)	1
Dutch Albums (Album Top 100)	3
Finnish Albums (The Official Finnish Charts)	2
German Albums (Offizielle Top 100)	6
Italian Albums (HitParadeItalia)	1
Japanese Albums (Oricon)	4
Norwegian Albums (VG-lista)	3
Spanish Albums (AFE)	1
UK Albums (Official Charts)	6
US Billboard Top LPs	1
US Best Selling Soul LP's (Billboard)	5

=== Year-end charts ===
Chart (1972)	Position
German Albums (Offizielle Top 100)	16

== Certifications ==
Region	Certification	Certified units/sales
United States (RIAA)	2× Platinum	2,000,000^{^}
^{^} Shipments figures based on certification alone.
