= Soul Sacrifice (song) =

Instrumental first recorded by Santana in 1969

- Picture sleeve (1970 CBS Europe single)

Instrumental by Santana

from the album Santana
- Released: August 1969
- Recorded: May 1969
- Studio: Pacific Recording, San Mateo, California
- Genre: Latin rock; psychedelic rock
- Length: 6:37
- Label: Columbia
- Composers: David Brown; Marcus Malone; Gregg Rolie; Carlos Santana
- Producers: Brent Dangerfield; Santana

"Soul Sacrifice" is an instrumental composed and recorded by the American rock group Santana. Identified as one of the highlights of the 1969 Woodstock festival and documentary film, "Soul Sacrifice" features extended guitar passages by Carlos Santana and a percussion section with a solo by drummer Michael Shrieve.

"Soul Sacrifice" is included as the final track on their 1969 debut album, Santana, and on several live and compilation albums. The studio and Woodstock versions as well as an alternate take are included on the 2004 35th anniversary of Santana.

== Background ==
"Soul Sacrifice" was one of Santana's earliest compositions. Carlos Santana recalled the group wrote it when bassist David Brown joined. Though the album Santana credits the composition to the whole group, BMI records (see BMI work #1388437) attribute it more specifically to four of the members: Brown, Marcus Malone (who had left Santana by the time the album was recorded), Gregg Rolie, and Carlos Santana. It has been described as "a perfect example of the amalgam of old-world guaguanco rhythms and strictly American licks" and includes "interplay between Santana and [Gregg] Rolie ... hammered home by [Mike] Carabello's and [Jose 'Chepito'] Areas' congas and the sinuous drums and bass of [Mike] Shrieve and Brown".

Before its release on their album, Santana, then a largely unknown band, performed "Soul Sacrifice" as their closing number at Woodstock. "They were the only act to play without a record; it was unparalleled. Santana went from Woodstock to being in global demand almost overnight". In several interviews, Santana recalled experiencing the effects of psychedelics during the performance, but got it together for the finale. "By the time we got to 'Soul Sacrifice', I had come back from a pretty intense journey. Ultimately, I felt we had plugged in to a whole lot of hearts at Woodstock".

The Woodstock soundtrack album reached number one in the Billboard Top LPs album chart; helped by the publicity generated by their Woodstock performance of "Soul Sacrifice", Santana's debut album reached number four.

== Charts ==
Chart (1970)	Peak position
Belgium (Ultratop 50 Wallonia)	33
Netherlands (Dutch Top 40)	24
Netherlands (Single Top 100)	16
