= Abraxas (album) =

- Album cover from Annunciation by Mati Klarwein

Studio album by Santana
- Released: September 23, 1970
- Recorded: April 17 – May 2, 1970
- Studios: Wally Heider Studios, San Francisco; Pacific Recorders, San Mateo, California
- Genres: Latin rock; Chicano rock; jazz fusion; psychedelic rock; blues rock
- Length: 37:36
- Languages: English; Spanish
- Label: Columbia
- Producers: Fred Catero; Carlos Santana

Santana chronology
Santana (1969)	Abraxas (1970)	Santana III (1971)

Singles from Abraxas
- 1. "Black Magic Woman" Released: 1970; 2. "Oye Cómo Va" Released: 1971; 3. "Hope You're Feeling Better" Released: 1971; 4. "Samba Pa Ti" Released: 1973

Abraxas is the second studio album by the American rock band Santana. It was released on September 23, 1970, by Columbia Records and became the band's first album to top the Billboard 200 in the United States. In 2020, Rolling Stone magazine ranked the album number 334 on its list of the "500 Greatest Albums of All Time".

== Title ==
The title of the album originates from a line in Hermann Hesse's 1919 book Demian, quoted on the album's back cover: "We stood before it and began to freeze inside from the exertion. We questioned the painting, berated it, made love to it, prayed to it: We called it mother, called it whore and slut, called it our beloved, called it Abraxas..."

== Songs ==
Carlos Santana had been interested in Fleetwood Mac's leader and songwriter Peter Green, having seen him perform at the Fillmore West in San Francisco, and decided to cover the band's song "Black Magic Woman" (both had also been influenced as guitarists by B.B. King). The band added a cover of Gábor Szabó's instrumental "Gypsy Queen" to the end. "Oye Como Va" was a hit by Tito Puente in the early 1960s and the group played it live regularly, as they realized it was good for audiences to dance to.

"Incident at Neshabur" was co-written by Santana and his friend Alberto Gianquinto, who played piano on the track. Gregg Rolie played the other keyboards, contrasting with Gianquinto's jazz-influenced style. It ran through various time and key signatures.

The instrumental, "Samba Pa Ti" ("Samba for You"), was written by Santana when he saw a jazz saxophonist performing in the street outside his apartment. It was later covered by José Feliciano, who added lyrics, and also by Angélique Kidjo, who put lyrics in Yoruba, on her album Oyo. It is also one of the tracks featured in Nick Hornby's book 31 Songs.

== Cover art ==
The album cover features the 1961 painting Annunciation by German-French painter Mati Klarwein. According to the artist, it was one of the first paintings he did after relocating to New York City. Carlos Santana reportedly noticed it in a magazine and asked that it be on the cover of the band's upcoming album. On the back of the record sleeve the cover art is just credited to 'MATI'. It is now considered a classic of rock album covers. Klarwein went on to design album artwork for many notable artists, including Miles Davis, Herbie Hancock, Gregg Allman, and Earth, Wind & Fire.

== Critical reception ==
Professional ratings
Review scores
Source	Rating
AllMusic	5/5 stars
Christgau's Record Guide	C+
Rolling Stone	(favorable)
The Rolling Stone Album Guide	5/5 stars
The Encyclopedia of Popular Music	5/5 stars

In 2003, the album was ranked No. 205 on Rolling Stone magazine's list of the 500 greatest albums of all time, at No. 207 on the 2012 revision of the list, and then again at No. 334 in its 2020 release. In 2000, it appeared at No. 202 in Colin Larkin's All Time Top 1000 Albums. The album was also included in the book 1001 Albums You Must Hear Before You Die. In 2015, the album was listed among Billboard's 50 Essential Latin Albums of the 50 Past Years.

Rock critic Robert Christgau, in one of his capsule reviews in The Village Voice, at the time of the album's release, gave it a rating of only C+, which denotes "a not disreputable performance, most likely a failed experiment or a pleasant piece of hackwork".

== Legacy ==
Abraxas was deemed "culturally, historically, or aesthetically significant" by the Library of Congress and was selected for preservation in their National Recording Registry in 2015.

== Track listing ==
=== Original release ===
Side one
No.	Title	Writer(s)	Length
1.	"Singing Winds, Crying Beasts"	Michael Carabello	4:51
2.	"Black Magic Woman/Gypsy Queen"	Peter Green/Gábor Szabó	5:24
3.	"Oye Cómo Va"	Tito Puente	4:17
4.	"Incident at Neshabur"	Alberto Gianquinto; Carlos Santana	4:58

Side two
No.	Title	Writer(s)	Length
1.	"Se a Cabó"	José Areas	2:50
2.	"Mother's Daughter"	Gregg Rolie	4:25
3.	"Samba Pa Ti"	Santana	4:45
4.	"Hope You're Feeling Better"	Rolie	4:10
5.	"El Nicoya"	Areas	1:30

=== 1998 bonus tracks ===
1998 remastered edition
No.	Title	Length
10.	"Se a Cabó" (Live at the Royal Albert Hall, London, England, April 18, 1970) (1998 edition)	3:47
11.	"Toussaint L'Overture" (Live at the Royal Albert Hall, London, England, April 18, 1970) (1998 edition)	4:52
12.	"Black Magic Woman/Gypsy Queen" (Live at the Royal Albert Hall, London, England, April 18, 1970) (1998 edition)	4:57

== Personnel ==
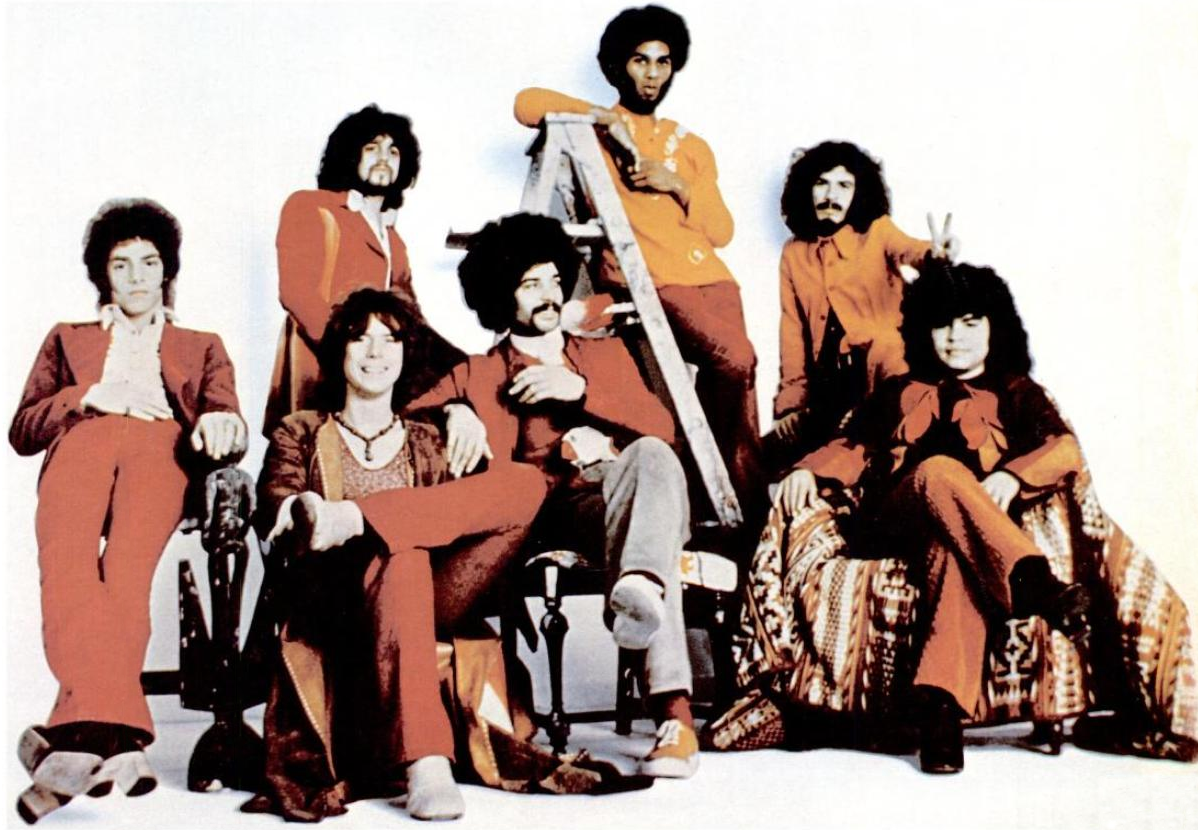
Santana in 1971

=== Santana ===
- Carlos Santana – lead guitar, backing vocals, producer
- Gregg Rolie – keyboards, lead vocals
- David Brown – bass
- Michael Shrieve – drums
- José "Chepito" Areas – percussion, congas, timbales
- Michael Carabello – percussion, congas, possibly keyboards on "Singing Winds, Crying Beasts" (the latter disputed by Santana)

=== Additional personnel ===
- Rico Reyes – backing vocals on "Oye Como Va" and “El Nicoya”, percussion on "El Nicoya"
- Alberto Gianquinto – piano on "Incident at Neshabur"
- Fred Catero – producer
- John Fiore, David Brown – engineer
- Bob Venosa – graphics
- MATI – illustrations
- Marian Schmidt, Joan Chase – photography

== Release history ==
- In 1990, CBS/Sony published a remastered edition on Audio CD (UPC: 7464301302).
- In 1991, Mobile Fidelity Sound Lab released a remastered version on their Ultradisc (24K) Gold CD (UDCD 552).
- In 1997, ARS (Audiophile record service Joerg Kessler) of Germany, released a 180 gram 100% virgin vinyl pressing mastered from the original analog tape. It is (Pallas) Germany pressed. Catalog # Ars 32032.
- In 1998, Sony published a remastered version, which included three previously unreleased live tracks: "Se a Cabó", "Toussaint L'Overture" and "Black Magic Woman/Gypsy Queen", recorded at the Royal Albert Hall on April 18, 1970.
- In 1998, SME records in Japan, part of Sony Music, also released the remastered version as an SACD. This disc is stereo only, and furthermore, it is a single layer SACD, which means that ordinary CD players will not play it. This disc contains the same bonus tracks as the ordinary 1998 remastered CD.
- In 2008, Mobile Fidelity Sound Lab released a remastered version on their Ultradisc II (24K) Gold CD (UDCD 775) & GAIN 2 Ultra Analog LP 180g Series (MFSL305).
- In 2016 Mobile Fidelity Sound Lab released a new, limited edition, 45 rpm 2-LP box set of Abraxas called the 1 step (UD1S). The set was limited to 2500 copies worldwide and involved a process where several of the traditional steps in making a vinyl record were bypassed in order to get a more original sound. It is mastered using a 1/4" / 15 IPS analog master to DSD 256 to analog console to lathe.

== Charts ==
Chart (1970–1974)	Peak position
Australian Albums (Kent Music Report)	1
Canada Top Albums/CDs (RPM)	3
Dutch Albums (Album Top 100)	7
Finnish Albums (The Official Finnish Charts)	2
French Albums (SNEP)	7
German Albums (Offizielle Top 100)	4
Italian Albums (Musica e Dischi)	4
Japanese Albums (Oricon)	7
Norwegian Albums (VG-lista)	3
UK Albums (Official Charts)	7
US Billboard Top LPs	1
US Best Selling Soul LP's (Billboard)	3

Chart (2013)	Peak position
UK Rock & Metal Albums (Official Charts)	25

== Certifications ==
Region	Certification	Certified units/sales
Canada (Music Canada)	3× Platinum	300,000^{^}
France (SNEP)	Platinum	300,000^{*}
Italy (FIMI) sales since 2009	Gold	25,000^{‡}
United Kingdom (BPI)	Gold	100,000^{^}
United States (RIAA)	5× Platinum	5,000,000^{^}
^{*} Sales figures based on certification alone.^{^} Shipments figures based on certification alone.^{‡} Sales+streaming figures based on certification alone.

== See also ==
- 1970s in Latin music
- List of best-selling Latin albums
