= Oye Cómo Va =

1962 Tito Puente song

Song by Tito Puente

from the album El Rey Bravo
- Language: Spanish
- Released: 1962
- Recorded: 1961
- Genre: Cha-cha-chá
- Length: 4:26
- Label: Tico
- Songwriter: Ernest Puente Jr.

"Oye Cómo Va" is a 1962 cha-cha-chá song by Tito Puente, originally released on El Rey Bravo (Tico Records). The song achieved worldwide popularity when it was covered by American rock group Santana for their 1970 album Abraxas. This version was released as a single in 1971, reaching number 13 on the Billboard Hot 100, number 11 on the Billboard Easy Listening survey, and number 32 on the R&B chart. The block chord ostinato pattern that repeats throughout the song was most likely borrowed by Puente from Cachao's 1957 mambo "Chanchullo", which was recorded by Puente in 1959.

The song has been praised by critics and inducted into the Latin Grammy Hall of Fame in 2001 and the Grammy Hall of Fame in 2002. Due to its multinational origins–Cuban, Puerto Rican and American–and its many versions by artists from all over the world, "Oye Cómo Va" has come to represent "the interconnectedness, hybridity and transnationality" of Latin music in the United States.

== Original version ==
"Oye Cómo Va" was written and recorded by Tito Puente and his orchestra in 1962 for Tico Records. The name of the song is taken from its refrain: "Oye cómo va, mi ritmo..." (Listen how it goes, my rhythm). The song was arranged as a cha-cha-chá with a repeated piano tumbao consisting of block chords and a vocal refrain sung by a chorus, typical of cha-cha-chá. The song's introduction and piano vamp which are highly similar to the 1957 mambo "Chanchullo" by Israel "Cachao" López. According to Max Salazar, it is likely that Puente was inspired by Cachao's tune when composing "Oye Cómo Va", given the clear similarities. In fact, Puente recorded the song in 1959 for his album Mucho cha cha (RCA Victor). The second section of the song resembles the introduction to "Te Enseñaré", written by Sergio Calzado and recorded by Estrellas Cubanas in 1960. Sergio Calzado's brother, Rudy, is the lead singer in Puente's recording.

Puente himself recorded "Oye Cómo Va" live on many occasions, including his 1980 Montreux Jazz Festival appearance with the Latin Percussion Jazz Ensemble.

The lineup in the original recording was the following:

- Tito Puente: timbales, chorus, leader
- Jimmy Frisaura: trumpet
- Pedro "Puchi" Boulong: trumpet
- Pat Russo: trumpet
- Barry Rogers: trombone
- Shep Pullman: baritone saxophone
- Rafael "Tata" Palau: tenor saxophone
- Jesús Caunedo: tenor saxophone
- Al Abreu: tenor saxophone
- Pete Fanelli: alto saxophone
- Johnny Pacheco: flute
- Gil López: piano
- Pupi Legarreta: violin
- Bobby Rodríguez: bass
- Juan "Papi" Cadavieco: congas
- José Mangual Sr.: bongos
- Santos Colón: vocals
- Rudy Calzado: vocals
- Yayo el Indio: chorus
- Chirivico Dávila: chorus

== Santana version ==
"Oye Como Va"

Single by Santana

from the album Abraxas
- Language: Spanish
- B-side: "Samba Pa Ti"
- Released: 1971
- Recorded: 1970
- Studio: Wally Heider Studios (San Francisco, CA)
- Genre: Latin rock
- Length: 4:17
- Label: CBS
- Songwriter: Ernest Puente Jr.
- Producers: Fred Catero; Carlos Santana

Santana singles chronology
| "Black Magic Woman" (1970) | "Oye Como Va" (1971) | "Hope You're Feeling Better"" (1971) |

Music video
- "Oye Como Va" (audio only) on YouTube

Santana's arrangement is a "driving, cranked-up version" in a new style of Latin rock, adding electric guitar, Hammond B-3 organ, and a rock drum kit to the instrumentation and dropping Puente's brass section. The electric guitar part takes on Puente's flute melody, and the organ provides accompaniment (with organist Gregg Rolie's discreet use of the Leslie effect). There are several guitar solos and an organ solo, all of which are rooted in rock and the blues but also contain licks similar to those of the original arrangement.

Tito Puente, speaking in the intro to his recording of "Oye Cómo Va" on the album Mambo Birdland, said "Everybody's heard of Santana. Santana! Beautiful Santana! He put our music, Latin rock, around the world, man! And I'd like to thank him publicly 'cause he recorded a tune and he gave me credit as the composer of the tune. So, since that day... all we play... is Santana music!" The version of the song on Mambo Birdland is a Santana-sized version. When interviewed, Puente explained how he was initially outraged by his song being covered by a rock band, until he received his first royalty check.

Santana's version was inducted into the Latin Grammy Hall of Fame in 2001 and the Grammy Hall of Fame in 2002. It was also included in the NPR 100 list, "the most important American musical works of the 20th century". In 2021, it was ranked No. 479 on Rolling Stone's "500 Greatest Songs of All Time".

Santana's recording was sampled by 2 Live Crew on the song "Mamolapenga" from their 1990 album Banned in the U.S.A..

=== Charts ===
==== Weekly charts ====
| Chart (1971–72) | Peak position |
|---|---|
| Australian Singles (Kent Music Report) | 13 |
| Canada (RPM) | 5 |
| Finnish Singles (The Official Finnish Charts) | 14 |
| Netherlands (Dutch Top 40) | 27 |
| Netherlands (Single Top 100) | 16 |
| Spain (AFE) | 15 |
| US Billboard Hot 100 | 13 |
| US Adult Contemporary (Billboard) | 11 |
| West Germany (GfK) | 29 |

==== Year-end charts ====
| Chart (1971) | Position |
|---|---|
| Canada Top Singles (RPM) | 76 |

== Other versions ==
The song has been covered by various musical artists, in both Latin and Jazz styles.

| Musician / Artist | Year Performed | Album | Genre |
|---|---|---|---|
| Joe Cuba | 1963, 1970 | medley with "Aprieta el pollo" | Latin |
| Azúcar Moreno | 1990 | Bandido | Latin |
| Gerardo Mejía | 1991 | Mo Ritmo; song titled Latin Till I Die (Oye Como Va) | Latin |
| Julio Iglesias | 1994 | Crazy; medley "Guajira / Oye Como Va" | Latin |
| Banda M-1 | 1994 | Single | Latin |
| Fruko y sus Tesos | 1999 | Todos bailan salsa | Latin |
| Celia Cruz | 2000 | Single | Latin |
| The Conga Kings | 2001 | Jazz Descargas | Jazz |
| Kinky | 2004 | Recordatorio | Latin |
| Chisato Moritaka | 1990,1992 | Kokon Tozai | Latin |
| Natalie Cole | 2013 | Natalie Cole en Español; medley "Oye Como Va/La Ultima Noche/Quien Sera/Yo Quiero Contigo Bailar/Guajira" featuring Arthur Hanlon | Latin |
| Bobby Hutcherson | 1975 | Montara | Jazz |
| Michel Camilo | 1997 | Thru My Eyes | Jazz |
| New Orleans Nightcrawlers | 2000 | Live at the Old Point | Jazz |
| Eliane Elias | 2006 | Around the City | Jazz |
| The Ventures | 1971 | New Testament | Jazz |
| Percy Faith | 1971 | Black Magic Woman | Easy Listening |

=== DJ Remixes ===
The song has been remixed by DJs as well. Two remixes charted in the United Kingdom. A remix of Tito Puente Jr & The Latin Rhythm's 1996 version of the song reached #36 in the UK charts. A second remix, released in 1997, peaked at #56.

=== In popular culture ===
The Peter Griffin version, from Family Guy, was part of “Pete’s Headphones” on Season 17 Episode 15 “No Giggity, No Doubt”.

A full rendition was performed by the character Gil Godwyn, played by American actor Brent Spiner, backed by a 9 piece jazz band, in the 1997 film Out to Sea.

=== Band Arrangements ===
The song has also has had band arrangements of it made over the years, notably Hal Leonard's Version by Paul Murtha with 629,000 views on YouTube

== See also ==
- List of best-selling Latin singles
