= Michael Carabello =

American percussionist (born 1947)

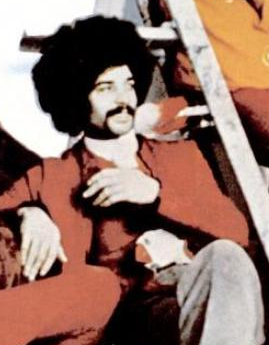
- Carabello in 1971

Background information
- Born: November 18, 1947 (age 77); San Francisco, California, U.S.
- Genres: Rock
- Occupation: Percussionist
- Years active: 1960s–present
- Formerly of: Santana

Michael Carabello (born November 18, 1947) is an American musician, best known for playing percussion with Santana during the band's early years. He is a member of the Rock and Roll Hall of Fame.

== Early life ==
Carabello was born in San Francisco and has Puerto Rican ancestry; he grew up in the city's Mission District. Later on in life, Carabello wanted to commission a mural depicting Carlos Santana, Bill Graham and himself, somewhere in the Mission District.

== Santana ==
Carabello joined Santana in 1968 shortly before the band signed with Columbia Records, and primarily played congas for the band while occasionally playing piano. He appeared on the albums Santana, Abraxas, and Santana III, all of which were internationally successful, and he is also depicted with the band in the Woodstock film. He co-wrote several songs on those albums, and is the sole writer for the percussion-oriented track "Singing Winds, Crying Beasts" on Abraxas.

Carabello left Santana in 1971. In 1998, Carabello was inducted into the Rock and Roll Hall of Fame as a member of Santana. He is the only member of the Hall of Fame whose primary instrument is congas. In 2016, Carabello participated in a reunion of the classic-era Santana lineup for the album Santana IV. It was the first time he had recorded with Carlos Santana and some other former bandmates in 45 years.

== Later works ==
Carabello formed the short-lived jazz band Cobra in 1975, and then settled into a career of teaching and art. He appeared on Tattoo You by The Rolling Stones in 1981.

== Discography ==
=== With Santana ===
==== Studio albums ====
Album	Album details
Santana	Released: August 30, 1969; Label: Columbia; Format: LP, CD
Abraxas	Released: September 23, 1970; Label: Columbia; Format: LP, CD, CC
Santana III	Released: September 1971; Label: Columbia; Format: LP, CD
Corazón	Released: May 6, 2014; Label: RCA/Sony Latin Iberia; Format: CD, digital download
Santana IV	Released: April 15, 2016; Label: Santana IV Records; Format: CD, digital download, vinyl

==== Live albums ====
Album	Album details
Corazón – Live from Mexico: Live It to Believe It	Released: September 9, 2014; Label: Sony BMG / Legacy; Format: CD+DVD-Video, Blu-ray+CD
Santana IV: Live at the House of Blues, Las Vegas	Released: October 21, 2016; Label: Eagle Rock; Format: CD, LP, DVD-Video, Blu-ray+CD

==== Singles ====
Single	Year
"Jingo"	1969
"Evil Ways"	1969
"Soul Sacrifice"	1970
"Black Magic Woman"	1970
"Oye Cómo Va"	1971
"Hope You're Feeling Better"	1971
"Everybody's Everything"	1971
"La Flaca" (featuring Juanes)	2014
"Anywhere You Want to Go"	2016
