= Evil Ways (Santana song) =

Single by Santana

from the album Santana
- B-side: "Waiting"
- Released: December 30, 1969
- Recorded: May 1969
- Genre: Rock
- Length: 3:54 (album version); 3:01 (single version)
- Label: Columbia
- Songwriter: Clarence "Sonny" Henry
- Producers: Brent Dangerfield, Santana

Santana singles chronology
"Jingo" (1969)	"Evil Ways" (1969)	"Black Magic Woman" (1970)

"Evil Ways" is a song made famous by the American rock band Santana from their 1969 debut album Santana. It was written by Clarence "Sonny" Henry and originally recorded by jazz percussionist Willie Bobo on his 1967 album Bobo Motion. The lyrics of the song are written in simple verse form.

Released as a single in late 1969, it became Santana's first Top 40 hit in the US, peaking at number 9 on the Billboard Hot 100 the week of March 21, 1970. Gregg Rolie performs the lead vocals and plays a Hammond organ solo in the middle section. The double-time coda includes a guitar solo performed by Carlos Santana, who also sings backing vocals.

== Other notable recordings and samples ==
Johnny Mathis released the song as a single in 1970. It made the Cash Box survey at number 118, and also appeared on the MOR music survey in Billboard (number 30).

== Erroneous credit ==
On first pressings of both Santana's debut album and the single release, the songwriting credit was given to Jimmie Zack. Zack was a minor rockabilly artist out of the Midwest who recorded a song with the same title in 1960, credited as Jimmie Zack and the Blues Rockers. It was not the same song as recorded by Santana, however.

== Charts ==
=== Weekly charts ===
Chart (1970)	Peak position
Australian Singles (Kent Music Report)	59
Canada Top Singles (RPM)	7
Netherlands (Dutch Top 40)	20
Netherlands (Single Top 100)	13
US Billboard Hot 100	9
US Adult Contemporary (Billboard)	19

=== Year-end charts ===
Chart (1970)	Position
Canada Top Singles (RPM)	92
US Billboard Hot 100	69
