= Santana (1969 album) =

Studio album by Santana
- Released: August 22, 1969
- Recorded: May 1969
- Studios: Pacific, San Mateo
- Genres: Latin rock; jazz fusion; psychedelic rock
- Length: 37:15
- Label: Columbia
- Producers: Santana; Brent Dangerfield

Santana chronology
Santana (1969)	Abraxas (1970)

Singles from Santana
- 1. "Jingo" Released: August 1969; 2. "Evil Ways" Released: December 30, 1969

Santana is the debut studio album by American Latin rock band Santana, released on August 22, 1969, by Columbia Records. Over half of the album's length is composed of instrumental music, recorded by what was originally a purely free-form jam band. At the suggestion of manager Bill Graham, the band took to writing more conventional songs for more impact, but managed to retain the essence of improvisation in the music.

The album was destined to be a major release, given a boost by the band's performance at the Woodstock Festival just 6 days before its release to the public. The album's first single, "Jingo", was only a modest performer, spending eight weeks on the chart and reaching #56; however, "Evil Ways", the second single taken from the album, was a U.S. Top 10 hit, reaching #9 and spending thirteen weeks on the chart. The album spent more than two years (108 weeks) on the Billboard Top LPs chart and peaked at #4 in November 1969. It also reached #34 on the UK Albums Chart. It has been mixed and released in both stereo and quadraphonic. The album cover features artwork by Lee Conklin.

== Critical reception ==
Professional ratings
Review scores
Source	Rating
AllMusic	4.5/5 stars
Encyclopedia of Popular Music	4/5 stars
Q	4/5 stars
Rolling Stone	4/5 stars
The Rolling Stone Album Guide	4/5 stars
The Village Voice	C−

In a contemporary review for Rolling Stone, Langdon Winner panned Santana as "a masterpiece of hollow techniques" and "a speed freak's delight - fast, pounding, frantic music with no real content". He compared the music's effect to methedrine, which "gives a high with no meaning", finding Rolie and Santana's playing repetitively unimaginative, amidst a monotony of incompetent rhythms and inconsequential lyrics. Village Voice critic Robert Christgau shared Winner's sentiment in his "unreconstructed opposition to the methedrine school of American music. A lot of noise".

A retrospective Rolling Stone review was more enthusiastic, finding Santana "thrilling ... with ambition, soul and absolute conviction - every moment played straight from the heart". In 2003, the magazine ranked Santana number 150 on their list of the 500 greatest albums of all time, moving up to 149 in a 2012 revised list. Colin Larkin deemed it an excellent example of Latin rock in his Encyclopedia of Popular Music (2011).

== Track listing ==
Songwriting credits per BMI records; the original album label simply credits all the original songs on the album to "Santana Band".

All tracks are written by José "Chepito" Areas, David Brown, Michael Carabello, Gregg Rolie, Carlos Santana, and Michael Shrieve except where noted.

Side one
No.	Title	Writer(s)	Length
1.	"Waiting"		4:03
2.	"Evil Ways"	Clarence "Sonny" Henry	3:54
3.	"Shades of Time"		3:14
4.	"Savor"		2:47
5.	"Jingo"	Babatunde Olatunji	4:21

Side two
No.	Title	Writer(s)	Length
6.	"Persuasion"		2:33
7.	"Treat"		4:43
8.	"You Just Don't Care"		4:34
9.	"Soul Sacrifice"	Brown; Marcus Malone; Rolie; Santana	6:37

=== 1998 reissue ===
Track lengths are in accord with album's inner notes.

No.	Title	Writer(s)	Length
1.	"Waiting"		4:03
2.	"Evil Ways"	Henry	3:57
3.	"Shades of Time"		3:14
4.	"Savor"		2:47
5.	"Jingo"	Olatunji	4:21
6.	"Persuasion"		2:33
7.	"Treat"		4:43
8.	"You Just Don't Care"		4:34
9.	"Soul Sacrifice"	Santana; Rolie; Malone; Brown	6:38
10.	"Savor" (Live at the Woodstock Festival, Bethel, New York, Saturday, August 16, 1969; previously unissued)		5:27
11.	"Soul Sacrifice" (Live at the Woodstock Festival, Bethel, New York, Saturday, August 16, 1969; released on Woodstock: Music from the Original Soundtrack and More, 1970)	Santana; Rolie; Malone; Brown	11:39
12.	"Fried Neckbones" (Live at the Woodstock Festival, Bethel, New York, Saturday, August 16, 1969; previously unissued)	Willie Bobo; Melvin Lastie	7:13

=== 2004 Legacy Edition ===
Disc 1
No.	Title	Writer(s)	Length
1.	"Waiting"		4:07
2.	"Evil Ways"	Henry	4:00
3.	"Shades of Time"		3:13
4.	"Savor"		2:46
5.	"Jingo"	Olatunji	4:23
6.	"Persuasion"		2:36
7.	"Treat"		4:46
8.	"You Just Don't Care"		4:37
9.	"Soul Sacrifice"	Santana; Rolie; Malone; Brown	6:38
10.	"Savor" (Alternate take #2)		2:57
11.	"Soul Sacrifice" (Alternate take #4)	Santana; Rolie; Malone; Brown	8:50
12.	"Studio Jam"		7:09

Note: Tracks 10–12 are from the studio sessions for the album recorded in May 1969.

Disc 2
No.	Title	Writer(s)	Length
1.	"Fried Neckbones"	Bobo; Lastie	7:41
2.	"Soul Sacrifice"	Santana; Rolie; Malone; Brown	9:06
3.	"Persuasion"		3:52
4.	"Treat"		6:49
5.	"Shades of Time"		2:29
6.	"Jingo"	Olatunji	5:20
7.	"Waiting" (Live at the Woodstock Festival, Bethel, New York, Saturday, August 16, 1969)		4:44
8.	"You Just Don't Care" (Live at the Woodstock Festival, Bethel, New York, Saturday, August 16, 1969)		4:55
9.	"Savor" (Live at the Woodstock Festival, Bethel, New York, Saturday, August 16, 1969)		5:25
10.	"Jingo" (Live at the Woodstock Festival, Bethel, New York, Saturday, August 16, 1969)	Olatunji	5:14
11.	"Persuasion" (Live at the Woodstock Festival, Bethel, New York, Saturday, August 16, 1969)		3:05
12.	"Soul Sacrifice" (Live at the Woodstock Festival, Bethel, New York, Saturday, August 16, 1969)	Santana; Rolie; Malone; Brown	11:49
13.	"Fried Neckbones" (Live at the Woodstock Festival, Bethel, New York, Saturday, August 16, 1969)	Bobo; Lastie	7:13

Note: Tracks 1–6 are from the original studio sessions for the album recorded January 27–29, 1969.

== Personnel ==
- Carlos Santana – guitar, backing vocals, additional lead vocal on "Shades of Time"
- David Brown – bass guitar
- Gregg Rolie – lead vocals, Hammond organ, piano
- Michael Shrieve – drums
- Michael Carabello – congas, percussion
- José "Chepito" Areas – timbales, congas, percussion

Production

- Brent Dangerfield and Santana band – producers
- David Brown – engineer
- Lee Conklin – album cover art
- David Rubinson – producer (original first session January 27–29, 1969)

== Charts ==
Chart (1969–1970)	Peak position
Australian Albums (Kent Music Report)	14
Canada Top Albums/CDs (RPM)	6
Dutch Albums (Album Top 100)	5
French Albums (SNEP)	5
German Albums (Offizielle Top 100)	12
Japanese Albums (Oricon)	98
Norwegian Albums (VG-lista)	19
Spanish Albums Chart	1
UK Albums (Official Charts)	34
US Billboard Top LPs	4
US Best Selling Soul LP's (Billboard)	13

== Certifications ==
Region	Certification	Certified units/sales
United States (RIAA)	2× Platinum	2,000,000^{^}
^{^} Shipments figures based on certification alone.
