= Santana (band) =

American rock band

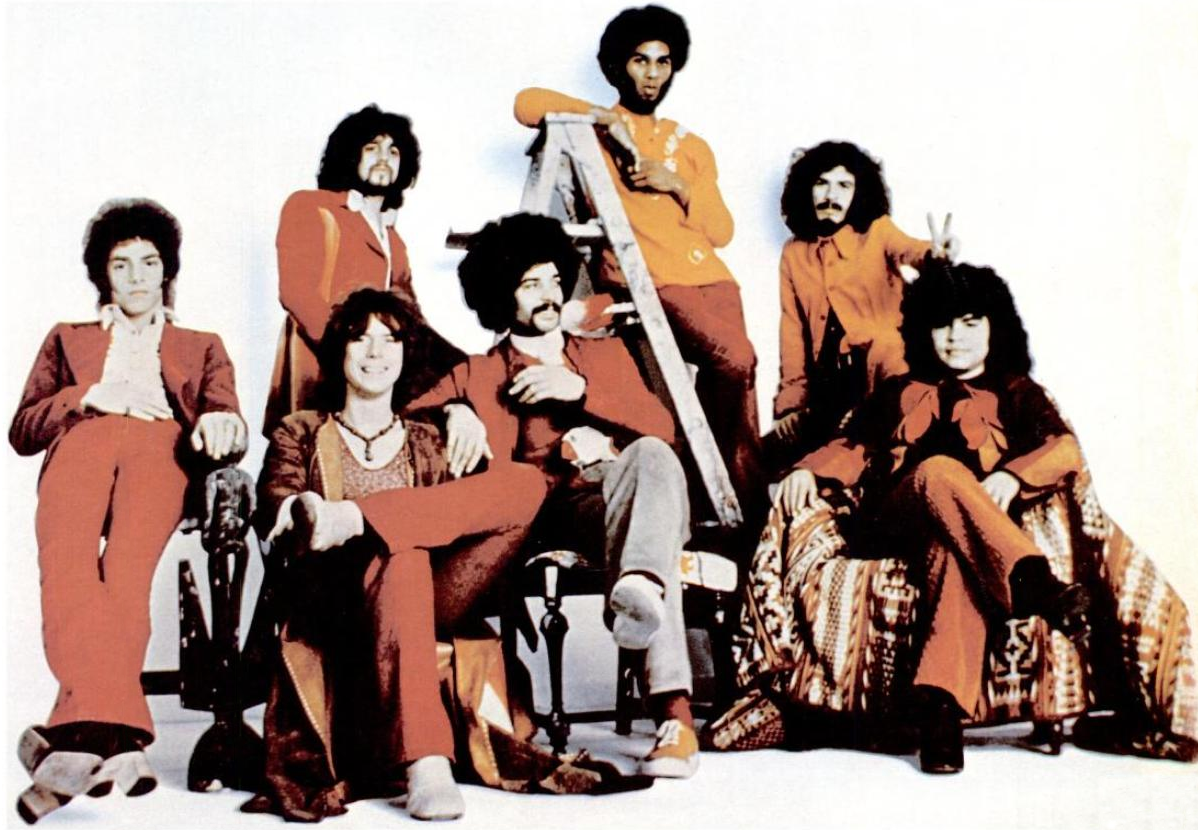
- The "classic" line-up in 1971. Left to right: Neal Schon, Gregg Rolie, Michael Shrieve, Michael Carabello, David Brown, Carlos Santana and José "Chepito" Areas.

Background information
- Also known as: Santana Blues Band (1966–67)
- Origin: San Francisco, California, United States
- Genres: Latin rock; blues rock; psychedelic rock; acid rock; Chicano rock; jazz fusion; yacht rock
- Years active: 1966–present
- Labels: Columbia; Polydor; Arista; RCA; Legacy; Concord; Suretone; Reprise
- Members: Carlos Santana; Tommy Anthony; Ray Greene; David K. Mathews; Paoli Mejías; Karl Perazzo; Benny Rietveld; Cindy Blackman Santana; Andy Vargas
- Past members: Neal Schon; Gregg Rolie; Michael Shrieve; Michael Carabello; David Brown; José "Chepito" Areas; (see Personnel section for others)
- Website: santana.com

Santana is an American rock band formed in San Francisco, California, in 1966 by Mexican-American guitarist Carlos Santana. The band has had various recording and performing line-ups in its history, with Santana being the only consistent member. After signing with Columbia Records, the band's appearance at the Woodstock Festival in 1969 increased their profile and they went on to record the critically acclaimed and commercially successful albums Santana (1969), Abraxas (1970) and Santana III (1971). These were recorded by the group's "classic" line-up, comprising organist and lead vocalist Gregg Rolie, percussionists José "Chepito" Areas and Michael Carabello, drummer Michael Shrieve and bassist David Brown. Hit songs of this period include "Evil Ways" (1970), "Black Magic Woman" (1970), "Oye Como Va" (1971) and the instrumental "Samba Pa Ti" (1970).

Following a change in line-up and musical direction in 1972, the band experimented with elements of jazz fusion on Caravanserai (1972), Welcome (1973) and Borboletta (1974). The band reached a new peak of critical and commercial success with their eighteenth album, Supernatural (1999), which included the Billboard Hot 100-number one singles "Smooth" (featuring Rob Thomas) and "Maria Maria" (featuring The Product G&B). The album peaked atop the charts in eleven countries and sold 12 million copies domestically. It won eight Grammy Awards at the 42nd Annual Grammy Awards, a record tied with Michael Jackson, and three Latin Grammy Awards. In 2014, the "classic" line-up—with the exception of Brown, who died in 2000, and Areas, who was not invited to participate—reunited for the Santana IV album (2016) and tour.

Santana is one of the best-selling groups of all time, with over 47 million certified records sold in the US and an estimated 100 million sold worldwide. Its discography includes 25 studio albums, 14 of which reached the US Top 10. In 1998, the line-up of Santana, Rolie, Carabello, Shrieve, Brown and Areas was inducted into the Rock and Roll Hall of Fame.

== History ==
=== 1966–1972: Formation and breakthrough ===
In 1966, Mexican-born American musician Carlos Santana discovered San Francisco's hippie and counterculture movement and found himself "wanting to be part of this new wave." Later that year, he began to assemble his own band, the first line-up of which included Sergio "Gus" Rodriguez on bass, Danny Haro on drums, and Michael Carabello on percussion. In January 1967, the four were granted an audition spot for concert promoter Bill Graham at the Fillmore Auditorium on a bill with the Paul Butterfield Blues Band and the Charles Lloyd Quartet, and named themselves the Santana Blues Band. Within a month, the group expanded with the addition of Tom Fraser on guitar and vocals, who also brought in Gregg Rolie on organ and vocals. The band stalled for several weeks, however, after Carlos was hospitalised with tuberculosis. In June 1967, Graham fired the group from performing at the Fillmore after some members turned up late for a gig supporting The Who and Loading Zone. The incident drove Carlos to bring in new and committed musicians, keeping Rolie with him. By the year's end, the band adopted the shorter name of Santana. Until early 1969, the band were joined by Marcus Malone on percussion, who left the group after being convicted of manslaughter.

In late 1968, the group secured a record deal with Columbia Records, following a successful audition opening for the Grateful Dead. The band had caught the interest of Columbia and Atlantic Records, and an audition was organised for both labels, but Carlos refused to perform for Atlantic as he wanted to be on the same label as Miles Davis and Bob Dylan. In December, Santana performed a series of concerts at the Fillmore that were recorded for a proposed live album. Biographer Simon Leng said it marked Santana moving away from its blues and R&B roots towards the "Santana sound" with the addition of Afro-Cuban and jazz numbers into their sets. After several line-up changes, the group finally stabilised in May 1969 with Santana, Rolie, Carabello, David Brown on bass, Michael Shrieve on drums, and Jose "Chepito" Areas on percussion, which became known as the "classic" line-up.

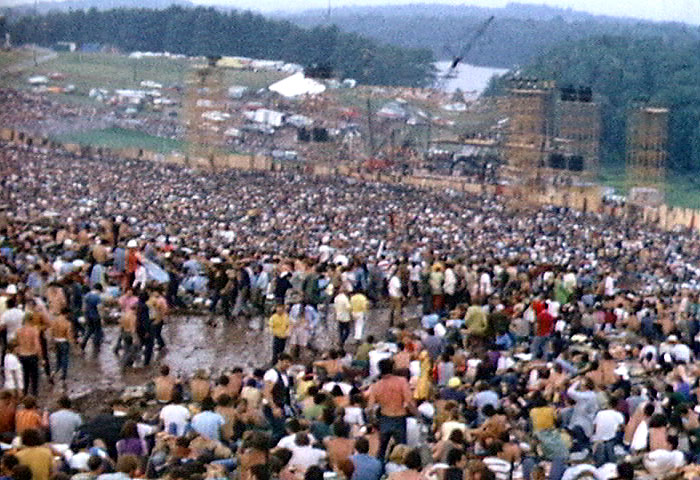
Santana rose to prominence following their appearance at Woodstock

The band recorded their debut album, Santana, in San Francisco in May 1969. It was their third go at recording an album, after previous attempts failed to produce results they wanted. The sessions featured Alberto Gianquinto on piano, who also helped with the arrangements of the tracks. He quickly noticed the group's main problem: the solo spots were too long. Graham agreed, and advised that the band needed to cut the lengthy jams and begin constructing songs. He also got the band to listen to Willie Bobo's version of "Evil Ways", and suggested they record their own version. With the album recorded, Graham arranged for Santana to tour the Midwest as openers for Crosby, Stills and Nash, which expanded the group's profile outside the West Coast. Around this time, Graham had been asked to help organise the upcoming Woodstock Festival and agreed to promote it on the condition that Santana would be added to the bill. Graham persisted, and the band were assigned a 45-minute set in the afternoon of August 16, the second day, for $2,500. The performance launched the group to international fame, and Santana, released on August 30, peaked at No. 4 on the US Billboard 200. The first single, "Jingo", was followed by "Evil Ways", which peaked at No. 9 on the Billboard Hot 100. In October 1969, Graham had Santana perform at the Gold Rush rock music festival and on The Ed Sullivan Show, further increasing the group's nationwide exposure. In November 1969, Santana performed at New Providence High School in New Providence, NJ.

In April 1970, Santana returned to the studio to record its second album, Abraxas. The album, highlighted by a reworking of "Black Magic Woman" by Fleetwood Mac that peaked at No. 4 in the US Billboard Hot 100, was released in September 1970 and rose to No. 1 on the US Billboard 200.

By 1971, the group were still struggling to maintain a strong musical direction. From January to July they recorded Santana III. Released in September 1971, the album also reached No. 1 on the US Billboard 200. At the peak of the band's popularity, the album was the last to feature its classic Woodstock era line-up. Santana explained that there was a lot of unnecessary internal resentment and that managerial problems contributed to the problem, leading to Graham's dismissal. That year, they performed at a concert in Accra to commemorate Ghana's 14th Independence Day. The concert was filmed and released in theaters as Soul to Soul. Matters came to a head shortly before the Santana III tour in September 1971 began, when Carlos wanted Carabello to leave the group, otherwise Carlos himself would quit. The band started the tour without Carlos, performing amidst shouts from the audience for the guitarist. After several gigs, Carlos reunited with the band to find Carabello, Areas, and manager/promoter Stan Marcum had quit, leaving the band to perform without percussionists. James "Mingo" Lewis was quickly brought in as a temporary replacement after he saw the band live and offered his services. Santana's gig in Lima, Peru in December 1971 brought further trouble, as the outbreak of violence resulted in their equipment being confiscated and the band deported from the country. The incident was a wake-up call for Carlos, who was determined to "bring the madness to an end."

In 1972, Santana had been increasingly influenced by the music of Miles Davis, John Coltrane, and Joe Zawinul, who had explored jazz fusion by this time. The fourth album, Caravanserai (1972), marked a number of line-up changes; bassist David Brown left in 1971 before recording started and was replaced by Doug Rauch and Tom Rutley. Carabello was replaced with two percussionists, Armando Peraza and Mingo Lewis. Rolie was replaced by Tom Coster on a few songs. Caravanserai debuted at No. 8 in the US.

=== 1973–1979: Experimentation and consolidation ===
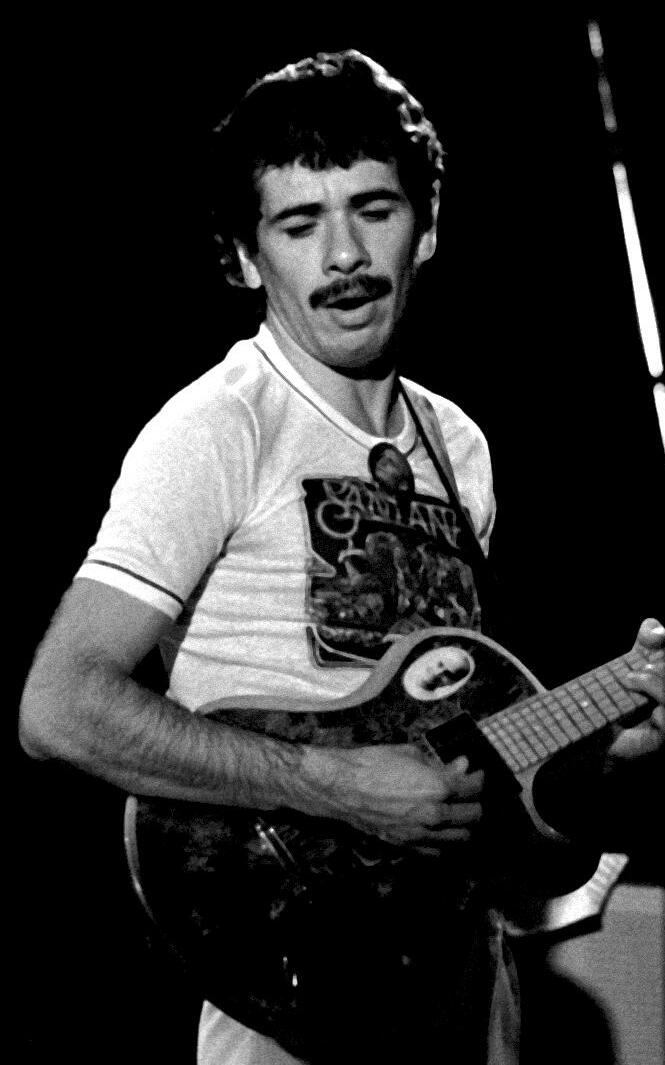
Carlos Santana in 1973

Thirteen months after Caravanserai, Santana released Welcome. Welcome was the first of four consecutive albums to achieve gold certification, as opposed to the previous four, which all at least reached platinum status. The album peaked at No. 25 on the Billboard 200, the lowest of the band's career so far. The next few albums contained a more experimental style than their previous work, beginning with Borboletta, which fared arguably worse than its predecessor, despite climbing five spots higher on the Billboard album charts in the US.

The group's 1976 release, Amigos, was far more successful. Reaching No. 10 on the US charts and also hitting the Top 10 in France, Australia, New Zealand, Austria, and the Netherlands, it was a return to the success of their early albums. Festival did not obtain the same newfound success, but it was followed by another successful album, Moonflower, released in 1977. The album was possibly the most successful since Santana III, achieving 2× platinum in the US, and being the first album since 1974's Borboletta to break the Top 10 in the UK. It was characterized by a stylistic shift for the band, as it contained heavier influences from the more conventional sound of the group's early work, while still maintaining the experimental sound of their last few albums.

Their next two releases, Inner Secrets and Marathon, released in 1978 and '79, respectively, were a further musical shift for the band, moving away from the Latin-fused rock music that had characterized their work in the late 1960s and the majority of the '70s, to move toward a more album-oriented, conventional rock sound. These albums, however, fared poorly commercially, although both achieved gold status in the U.S. Marathon featured the debut of lead singer Alex Ligertwood, who would remain with the band off and on until 1994.

=== 1980–1997: Commercial decline and seven-year hiatus ===
The 1980s started relatively brightly for Santana, with 1981's platinum-selling Zebop!, which also reached the Top 20 in several countries, and continued the more conventional rock sound. The following year, Shangó was released; this album marked a steep decline in the band's commercial fortunes, although it still achieved gold status.

The group waited another three years to release the follow-up, the longest break for them so far. 1985's Beyond Appearances was a commercial failure and their first album not to achieve gold certification. Their following three releases all continued this commercial decline, with the last of these failing to break the Billboard Top 100. In the midst of this commercial pitfall, the band stopped recording material for an unprecedented seven years but continued to tour.

=== 1998–2001: Supernatural and the Rock and Roll Hall of Fame ===
In 1998, Santana was inducted into the Rock and Roll Hall of Fame. The following year, their album Supernatural (1999) debuted at No. 19 on the Billboard 200 and reached No. 1 after eighteen weeks. Also reaching No. 1 were two singles: "Smooth", recorded with Rob Thomas, and "Maria Maria" featuring The Product G&B. The album was certified platinum 15 times by the RIAA and sold 30 million copies worldwide. Santana's previous No. 1 album had been Santana III in 1971. According to Guinness World Records, this is the longest gap between No. 1 albums.

Supernatural won eight Grammy Awards, including the award for Album of the Year, and also won three Latin Grammy Awards.

=== 2002–2012: Dealing with newfound success ===
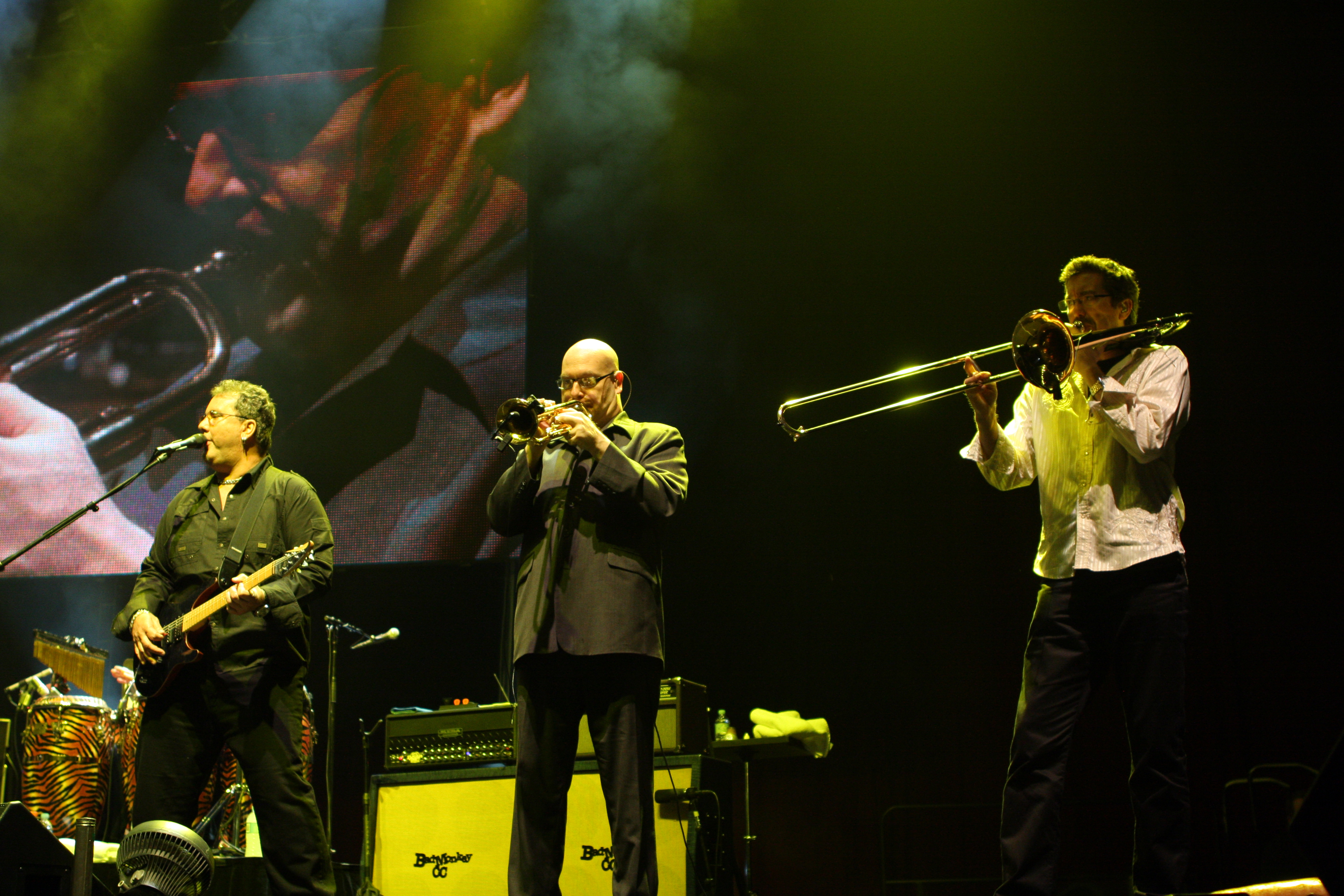
Santana performing in 2011

The follow-up to Supernatural came three years later and was highly anticipated by international media and fans alike. On October 22, 2002, Shaman was released worldwide. Although it initially sold briskly (298,973 copies in the US in its first week) and debuted at number 1 on the Billboard 200, the album's appeal quickly wore off and it soon slid down the charts. Despite this, it went on to sell 2× platinum in the US, and achieved platinum status in several other countries including Australia. The first single released from the album, "The Game of Love", which featured vocals from Michelle Branch, debuted at number 5 on the Hot 100. The album's next four singles failed to chart in most countries, but the final single, "Why Don't You & I", featuring the vocals of Alex Band, reached number 8 on the Hot 100. Musically, the album was a return to a more conventional sound for the group, with a mainly Latin rock-based sound.

With their renewed appeal worn off, another three-year wait saw the release of 2005's All That I Am. The album debuted at number 2 on the Billboard 200 but fared worse internationally, and quickly lost appeal. The album, a continuation of the Latin-rock influenced sound of Shaman, achieved gold certification in the US. A five-year break from recording saw the release of another studio album, Guitar Heaven (2010). Musically it was a drastic change for the band, with a far heavier sound at its core and strong heavy metal influences. It debuted at number 5 on the Billboard 200 but marked another decline for the band, failing to achieve gold status.

In 2012 the group released Shape Shifter, which returned to the conventional Latin rock sound and was completely album-oriented, as no singles were released from it. It debuted at number 16 on the Billboard 200.

=== 2013–2020: Reunion of the classic line-up, Corazón, Santana IV, and Africa Speaks ===
In February 2013, Carlos Santana confirmed that he would reunite his classic line-up, most of whom played Woodstock with him in 1969. Santana stated that he was reuniting the group with the intention of recording new music. Confirmed for the reunion were Neal Schon, who was in the band in the early 1970s where he traded lead guitar work with Santana before leaving with founding Santana singer-organist Gregg Rolie in 1973 to form Journey; drummer Mike Shrieve and percussionist Mike Carabello. Santana said of Rolie, who played with Ringo Starr's All-Starr Band for the last two years, "I'm pretty sure Gregg's going to do it." In February 2013, Rolie told Radio.com, "it's (the reunion) just a matter of putting it together and going and doing it. I would do it. I think it's a great idea. People would love it. It could be great!"

Before the reunion album was released, on May 6, 2014, the then-current lineup of Santana released a new studio album titled Corazón. On September 9, 2014, this was followed by the release of Corazón – Live from Mexico: Live It to Believe It, a live album (on CD, DVD and Blu-ray) of their December 14, 2013 concert in Guadalajara, Mexico.

On April 15, 2016, Santana released Santana IV, the wildly anticipated studio album that reunited the late 1960s and early 1970s classic lineup of Carlos Santana (guitar, vocals), Gregg Rolie (keyboards, lead vocals), Neal Schon (guitar, vocals), Michael Carabello (percussion) and Michael Shrieve (drums). The album marked the first time in 45 years – since 1971's multi-platinum classic Santana III – that the quintet had recorded together. The first single from Santana IV, titled "Anywhere You Want to Go", had been previously released on February 5, 2016.

The origins of the reunion went back several years, when Schon suggested that he and Carlos Santana record together. Santana liked the idea but proposed that they recruit Rolie, Shrieve, and Carabello for what would be called "Santana IV". After initial writing sessions and rehearsals in 2013, the group recorded throughout 2014 and 2015, amassing 16 new tracks that combined all their signature elements – Afro-Latin rhythms, soaring vocals, electrifying blues-psychedelic guitar solos, and irrepressible jubilant percussion work.

About the "Santana IV" team, Santana stated: "It was magical, we didn't have to try to force the vibe – it was immense. From there, we then needed to come up with a balance of songs and jams that people would immediately identify as Santana." Santana IV features 16 all-new tracks written and produced by the band. Joining the core "Santana IV" band in the studio are current Santana members Karl Perazzo (percussion) and Benny Rietveld (bass), with vocalist Ronald Isley guesting on two cuts.

On October 21, 2016, Santana released Santana IV: Live at the House of Blues Las Vegas on Eagle Rock Entertainment, a live album (on DVD/Blu-ray/2CD) of their concert on March 21, 2016 at House of Blues in Mandalay Bay Resort and Casino on the Las Vegas Strip in Nevada.

In early January 2019, Santana signed with Concord Records; in late January, they released In Search of Mona Lisa, a new five-track EP. The day before, they also released a video for new single, "Do You Remember Me." In March 2019, the band announced plans to release on Africa Speaks, their new full-length album produced by Rick Rubin, on June 7.

2019 marked the 20th anniversary of Carlos Santana's album Supernatural and the 50th anniversary of his performance at Woodstock. Santana headlined a multi-year residency at House of Blues. The band was expected to headline at both Woodstock 50 (which was cancelled) and Bethel Woods' half-centennial celebration in Bethel, NY, in August 2019. The band toured in support of the latest album, from April to November 2019.

=== 2021–2024: Blessings and Miracles ===
On 18 and 20 August 2021, "Move" and "She's Fire", the first and second singles taken from Santana's (then) forthcoming new album Blessings and Miracles, were released; it was announced that the album would be released on 15 October 2021 via BMG Entertainment.

=== 2025–present: Sentient ===
On 21 February 2025, it was announced the upcoming release via Candid Records of Sentient, Santana's new studio album, a retrospective of 11 tracks featuring collaborations with other artists including Michael Jackson, Smokey Robinson, Miles Davis, Paolo Rustichelli, Darryl "DMC" McDaniels and Cindy Blackman Santana. The album includes "Whatever Happens", a track from Michael Jackson's last album, Invincible; remastered tracks such as "Let the Guitar Play", a re-work of "Song for Cindy" from Blessings and Miracles featuring Darryl "DMC" McDaniels; Grammy Awards winner "Blues for Salvador"; and three new tracks: Smokey Robinson's "Please Don't Take Your Love", "Coherence", and a track featuring Cindy Blackman Santana. It also includes an instrumental live version of Michael Jackson's "Stranger in Moscow" recorded in 2012 with Carlos as guest of Narada Michael Walden's band. The album was released on 28 March 2025.

On 16 April 2025 in Highland, California at the Yaamava’ Resort & Casino at San Manuel, Santana embarked on the eight-date Oneness North American tour, which ended on 29 April 2025 in Nashville, Tennessee at The Pinnacle.

On 9 June 2025 in Łódź, Poland at the Atlas Arena, Santana embarked on the 29-date Oneness Europe and UK tour. The tour included a show on 21 June 2025 in London, England, at The O2 and a seven-date leg in Spain from 26 July to 4 August 2025; it was due to end on 11 August 2025 in Copenhagen, Denmark.

== Personnel ==
Santana has had various recording and performing lineups in its history, with Santana being the only consistent member.

=== Current members ===
The current members of Santana are:

Image	Name	Years active	Instruments	Release contributions
	Carlos Santana	1966–present	lead guitar; vocals; percussion	all releases
	Benny Rietveld	1990–1992; 1997–present	bass	Spirits Dancing in the Flesh (1990); Milagro (1992); all releases from Supernatural (1999) onwards, except Live at the Fillmore 1968 (1997), The Very Best of Santana – Live in 1968 (2007) and The Woodstock Experience (2009)
	Karl Perazzo	1991–present	percussion; vocals	all releases from Milagro (1992) onwards, except Live at the Fillmore 1968 (1997), The Very Best of Santana – Live in 1968 (2007) and The Woodstock Experience (2009)
	Andy Vargas	2000–present	vocals; percussion	all releases from All That I Am (2005) onwards, except The Very Best of Santana – Live in 1968 (2007) and The Woodstock Experience (2009)
	Tommy Anthony	2005–present	rhythm guitar; vocals	all releases from Guitar Heaven (2010) onwards
	David K. Mathews	2011–present	keyboards	all releases from Corazón (2014) onwards
	Paoli Mejías	2013–present	percussion	Corazón (2014); Corazón: Live From México - Live It To Believe It (2014)
	Cindy Blackman Santana	2015–present	drums	Corazón (2014); Corazón: Live From México - Live It To Believe It (2014); In Search of Mona Lisa (2019); Africa Speaks (2019)
	Ray Greene	2016–present	vocals; percussion; trombone	In Search of Mona Lisa (2019); Africa Speaks (2019)
	Salvador Santana	2025–present	keyboards; vocals	none to date

=== Classic lineup ===
In addition to Carlos Santana, the band's classic lineup of the band's early success included the following members. It was this lineup that was inducted into the Rock and Roll Hall of Fame in 1998.

Image	Name	Years active	Instruments	Release contributions
	Gregg Rolie	1966-1972; 2014–2016	organ; piano; keyboards; lead vocals	all releases from Santana (1969) to Caravanserai (1972); Santana's Greatest Hits (1974); Shangó (1982); Freedom (1987); Live at the Fillmore 1968 (1997); The Very Best of Santana – Live in 1968 (2007); The Woodstock Experience (2009); Santana IV (2016); Santana IV: Live at the House of Blues, Las Vegas (2016)
	Michael Carabello	1966-1967; 1968–1971; 2014–2016	percussion; additional keyboards; vocals	Santana (1969); Abraxas (1970); Santana III (1971); Santana's Greatest Hits (1974); The Woodstock Experience (2009); Santana IV (2016); Santana IV: Live at the House of Blues, Las Vegas (2016)
	David Brown	1967–1971; 1974–1976 (died 2000)	bass	Santana (1969); Abraxas (1970); Santana III (1971); Santana's Greatest Hits (1974); Borboletta (1974); Amigos (1976); Live at the Fillmore 1968 (1997); The Very Best of Santana – Live in 1968 (2007); The Woodstock Experience (2009)
	José "Chepito" Areas	1969–1974; 1976–1977; 1988–1989	percussion; drums; trumpet	all releases from Santana (1969) to Lotus (1974); Santana's Greatest Hits (1974); Festivál (1977); Moonflower (1977); The Woodstock Experience (2009)
	Michael "Mike" Shrieve	1969–1974; 2014–2016	drums; percussion; occasional vocals	all releases from Santana (1969) to Borboletta (1974); The Woodstock Experience (2009); Santana IV (2016); Santana IV: Live at the House of Blues, Las Vegas (2016)

== Discography ==
- Santana (1969)
- Abraxas (1970)
- Santana (1971)
- Caravanserai (1972)
- Welcome (1973)
- Borboletta (1974)
- Amigos (1976)
- Festivál (1977)
- Moonflower (1977)
- Inner Secrets (1978)
- Marathon (1979)
- Zebop! (1981)
- Shangó (1982)
- Beyond Appearances (1985)
- Freedom (1987)
- Spirits Dancing in the Flesh (1990)
- Milagro (1992)
- Supernatural (1999)
- Shaman (2002)
- All That I Am (2005)
- Guitar Heaven (2010)
- Shape Shifter (2012)
- Corazón (2014)
- Santana IV (2016)
- Africa Speaks (2019)
- Blessings and Miracles (2021)

== Awards and nominations ==
Santana has won numerous awards, including eight Grammy Awards and three Latin Grammy Awards. The band was inducted into the Rock and Roll Hall of Fame in 1998; three of Santana's albums have been inducted the Grammy Hall of Fame (Abraxas in 1999, the original Santana in 2012, and Supernatural in 2025); and one song has been inducted into the Latin Grammy Hall of Fame ("Oye Como Va" in 2001).
