= Gregg Rolie =

American musician (b. 1947)

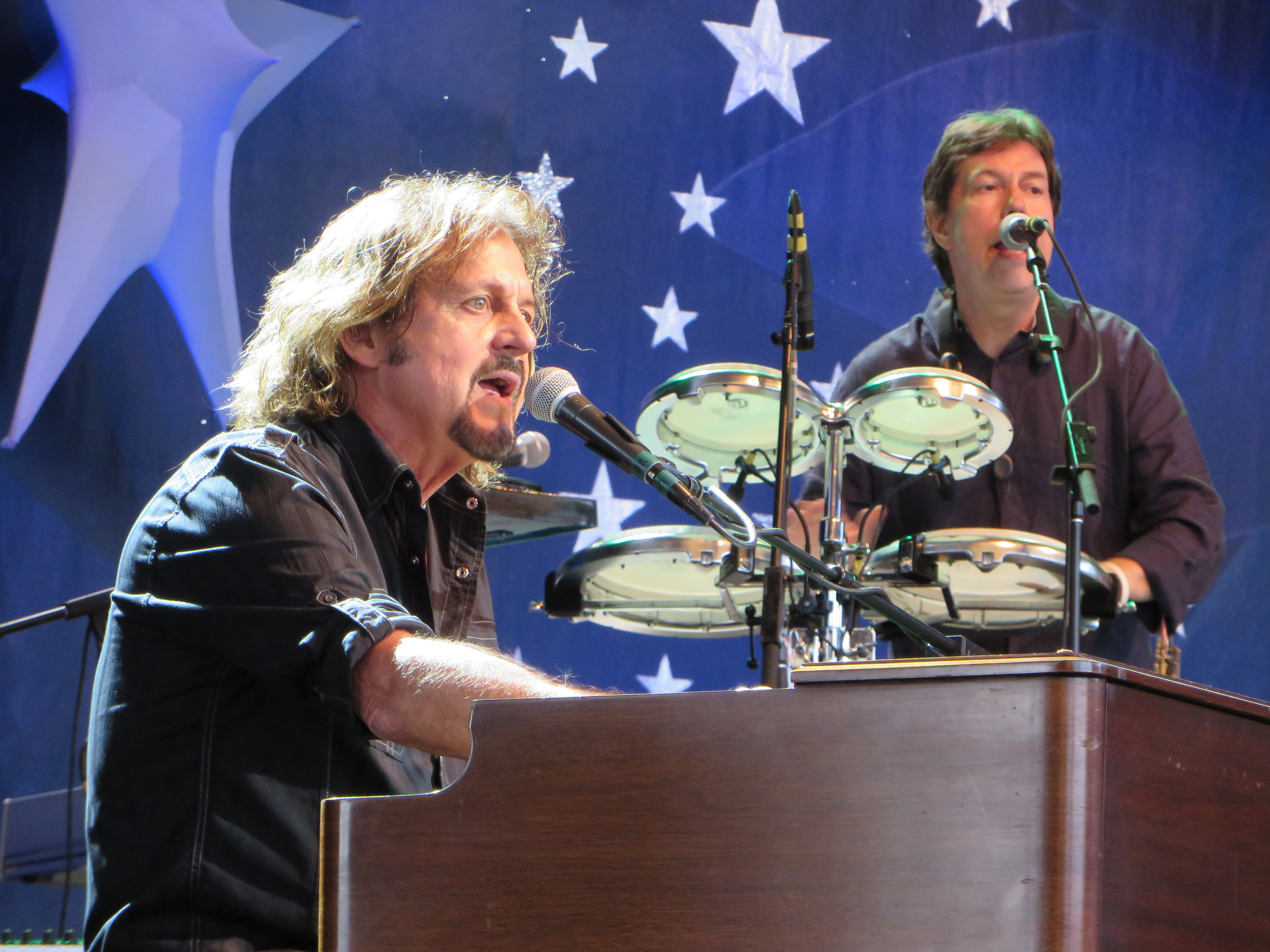
- Rolie performing with Ringo Starr & His All-Starr Band in June 2014

Background information
- Born: Gregg Alan Rolie; June 17, 1947 (age 79); Seattle, Washington, U.S.
- Genres: Hard rock; blues rock; Latin rock; progressive rock; pop rock; jazz fusion
- Occupations: Musician; singer; songwriter
- Instruments: Vocals; keyboards
- Years active: 1965–present
- Formerly of: Santana; Journey; The Storm; Abraxas Pool; Gregg Rolie Band; Ringo Starr & His All-Starr Band
- Website: greggrolie.com

Gregg Alan Rolie (born June 17, 1947) is an American keyboardist, singer and songwriter. Rolie was a founding member and original lead vocalist of both Santana and Journey. He also helmed rock group the Storm, performed in Ringo Starr & His All-Starr Band until 2021, and since 2001 with his Gregg Rolie Band. Rolie is a two-time inductee of the Rock and Roll Hall of Fame, having been inducted both as a member of Santana in 1998 and as a member of Journey in 2017.

== Career ==
Rolie was born in Seattle, Washington, United States. Prior to Santana, he played with a group called William Penn and His Pals while attending Cubberley High School in Palo Alto, California 1965, his senior year.

In 1966, Rolie joined Carlos Santana and others to form the Santana Blues Band, which was later shortened simply to Santana. As a co-founding member of Santana, Rolie was part of the band's first wave of success, including an appearance at the Woodstock Music and Art Festival in 1969 and central roles in several hit albums. He was their original lead vocalist, with his voice appearing on well-known Santana songs such as "Black Magic Woman" (US #4), "Oye Como Va", "No One To Depend On" and "Evil Ways". He also became well known for his skill on the Hammond B3 organ, with solos on many of the aforementioned hits. He has song-writing credits on many tracks from this period. However, persistent differences with Carlos Santana regarding the musical direction of the band led Rolie to leave in 1972.

In 1973 Rolie joined a new band with ex-Santana guitarist Neal Schon. This became Journey. Starring in a lineup that featured Schon, Aynsley Dunbar, George Tickner, and Ross Valory, he was keyboardist for the band's first six albums. On Journey and Look into the Future, he was lead vocalist, and on Next he shared those duties with guitarist Neal Schon. After Steve Perry joined the band in 1977, Rolie sang co-lead vocals on several songs on the albums Infinity, Evolution, and Departure. He started to feel burned out by the non-stop schedule of touring, plus felt his creativity was drained, and soon announced he was leaving the band. Since his departure was amicable, he hand picked his successor, Jonathan Cain.

After leaving Journey in 1980, Rolie released several solo albums, including the eponymous Gregg Rolie in 1985. This album featured the song "I Wanna Go Back", which later became a hit for Eddie Money, and included contributions from Carlos Santana, Peter Wolf, Neal Schon, Craig Chaquico, and David Margen. A second solo effort, Gringo, was released in 1987.

Rolie formed the Storm in 1991 with Steve Smith and Ross Valory of Journey. The band also included singer Kevin Chalfant and guitarist Josh Ramos. Prior to their inaugural tour in support of their first album, Steve Smith left the band and was replaced by Ron Wikso.

Similar to his work with Santana and Journey, Rolie played keyboards and was a co-lead vocalist on several tracks of the band's first, eponymous, album, which spent 17 weeks on the Billboard albums chart peaking at #133 and spawned the hit singles "I've Got a Lot to Learn About Love," and "Show Me the Way." Despite this success, Interscope Records shelved the band's second album, Eye Of The Storm, which was recorded in 1993. It was finally released in 1996 in Europe on the Music For Nations label, in 1997 in Japan on the Avex Trax/Bateknuckle label, and in 1998 in the United States on the Miramar label.

In 1998, Rolie and other former members of Santana, including Neal Schon, briefly reunited as Abraxas Pool, releasing one album.

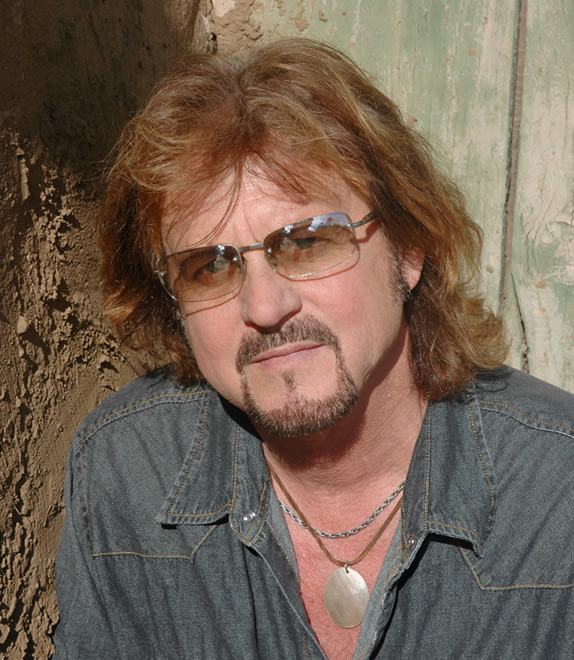
Rolie in 2007.

When Schon left to lead a re-formed Journey later that year, Rolie and Ron Wikso began work in 1999 on a Gregg Rolie solo CD titled Roots, which eventually led to the forming of the Gregg Rolie Band. Besides Rolie and Wikso, Roots featured appearances by Neal Schon, Alphonso Johnson, Dave Amato, Adrian Areas and Michael Carabello. The Gregg Rolie Band saw Kurt Griffey taking over guitar duties and the addition of Wally Minko as a second keyboardist. They recorded a live CD at Sturgis called Rain Dance, which was released in 2009.

In 2010, Rolie released Five Days and subsequently formed a duo with Alan Haynes, which eventually led to the formation of the Gregg Rolie Quartet, with the addition of long time collaborator/drummer, Ron Wikso and bassist Evan "Sticky" Lopez.

From 2012 to 2021 he toured as a member of Ringo Starr and his All Starr Band performing Santana hits "Black Magic Woman", "Evil Ways" and "Everybody's Everything". The band also included Toto guitarist Steve Lukather, Todd Rundgren, Richard Page, Mark Rivera and Gregg Bissonette.

On February 2, 2013 Carlos Santana confirmed that he would reunite his classic lineup, most of whom played Woodstock with him in 1969. Santana said of Rolie, "I'm pretty sure Gregg's going to do it." Speaking in 2012 of such a reunion, Rolie told Radio.com "it's just a matter of putting it together and going and doing it. I would do it. I think it's a great idea. People would love it. It could be great!" In 2016, as part of Santana's original line-up they released their fourth album, titled Santana IV.

On February 9, 2018, Rolie reunited with Schon for a charity show at San Francisco's The Independent, benefiting North Bay Fire Relief. The group also featured former Journey drummer Deen Castronovo (who also sang some of the vocals) and bassist Marco Mendoza of The Dead Daisies. In 2019 Rolie reunited with Schon, Castronovo and Mendoza for four more concert dates.

== Discography ==
=== Solo discography ===
(Also as Gregg Rolie Band)

- Gregg Rolie – 1985
- Gringo – 1987
- Rough Tracks – 1997
- Roots – 2001
- Rain Dance (Live 2007) – released 2009
- Five Days EP – 2011
- Sonic Ranch - 2019

=== with Santana ===
- Santana – 1969
- Abraxas – 1970
- Santana III – 1971
- Caravanserai – 1972
- Shangó – 1982
- Freedom – 1987
- Santana IV – 2016

=== with Journey ===
- Journey – 1975
- Look into the Future – 1976
- Next – 1977
- Infinity – 1978
- Evolution – 1979
- Departure – 1980
- Dream, After Dream – 1980
- Captured – 1981

=== with The Storm ===
- The Storm – 1991
- Eye of The Storm – 1993

=== with Abraxas Pool ===
- Abraxas Pool – 1997

== Collaboration ==
- Postcards from Paradise from Ringo Starr (2015) - Organ on and co-composition of "Island in the Sun".

Preceded by none	Journey keyboardist 1973–1980	Succeeded by Stevie "Keys" Roseman
Preceded by none	Journey lead vocalist 1973–1977	Succeeded by Robert Fleischman
