= Jin-go-lo-ba =

1959 song by Babatunde Olatunji

Song by Babatunde Olatunji

from the album Drums of Passion
- Genre: Afrobeat
- Length: 3:16
- Label: Columbia
- Songwriter: Babatunde Olatunji
- Producer: Al Ham

"Jin-go-lo-ba" (or "Jingo") is a song by Nigerian percussionist Babatunde Olatunji, featured on his first album Drums of Passion (1959). In Yoruba (Olatunji's native language) it means, "Do not worry."

The song featured "African-derived rhythms and chants" along with "swooping orchestration". In his autobiography, Olatunji said that this was the only song on his first album that he claimed formal ownership of, meaning that it was the only song he received royalties for. American disc jockey Francis Grasso described the song as "rhythmically sensual".

== Usage in media ==
The Fatboy Slim version is featured on Just Dance (2009) and Just Dance: Greatest Hits (2012). It was also featured on Just Dance 3 (2011) as a downloadable track for the Xbox 360 but became unavailable for purchase following the removal of most DLCs from the Xbox 360 Marketplace on August 20, 2023.

== Cover versions ==
It has been covered by Serge Gainsbourg, under the title "Marabout" and with no credit given to Olatunji, on his Gainsbourg Percussions LP (1964). The song was also covered by James Last on his album Voodoo-Party (1971), by Pierre Moerlen's Gong on their Downwind album (1979), Candido Camero (aka Candido) on his Dancin' & Prancin' album (1979), by Steve Lee on his album FKW – Jingo (1994) and by Fatboy Slim on his album Palookaville (2004). A cover version was also released by independent dance act the Ravish Brothers (featuring a Hot Funky Daddy Groove) in 1988, in Lightwater, Surrey. The song was also featured in the Hindi serial "Chandrakanta" that aired on DD.

In January 1988, a hit cover version by Jellybean (John Benitez), from his album Just Visiting This Planet, peaked at number 12 during a ten-week run on the UK Singles Chart.

=== Santana version ===
"Jingo"

Single by Santana

from the album Santana
- Released: August 1969
- Recorded: May 1969
- Genre: Latin rock
- Length: 4:21
- Label: Columbia
- Songwriter: Babatunde Olatunji
- Producers: Santana; Brent Dangerfield

Licensed audio
- "Jingo" on YouTube

The song was also covered by Santana, on their first album (1969), though Grasso noted this version was not as popular as the original on the dance floor. Spanish journalist Jose Miguel López stated that when Santana released "Jingo" as a single, it was first credited to Carlos Santana. Only years later the credits were corrected. Other multiple editions of Santana's "Jingo" single list the composer as A. Copland, evidently confusing this song with Part V. of composer Aaron Copland's "Statements for Orchestra", which is unrelated.

=== Charts ===
| Chart (1969–1970) | Peak position |
|---|---|
| Belgium (Ultratop 50 Flanders) | 1 |
| Belgium (Ultratop 50 Wallonia) | 3 |
| Canada Top Singles (RPM) | 38 |
| Netherlands (Dutch Top 40) | 4 |
| Netherlands (Single Top 100) | 4 |
| Spain (AFE) | 2 |
| US Billboard Hot 100 | 56 |
| West Germany (GfK) | 39 |
