= Santana discography =

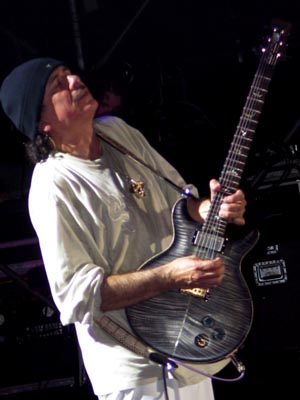
- Carlos Santana during a concert in 2005
- Studio albums: 26
- Live albums: 8
- Compilation albums: 23
- Singles: 61
- Collaboration albums: 13

The discography of the rock band Santana formed by the Mexican-American rock guitarist Carlos Santana consists of 26 studio albums, 8 live albums, 61 singles, and 23 compilation albums.

Santana formed in 1967 in San Francisco and was originally known as the Carlos Santana Blues Band. The first members were Carlos Santana (lead guitar), Tom Fraser (rhythm guitar), Sergio "Gus" Rodriguez (bass guitar), Gregg Rolie (Hammond organ, lead vocals), Michael Carabello (percussion) and Danny Haro (drums). Its breakthrough began two years later, playing in the Woodstock festival. Over the next few years, lineup changes were common and frequent, and although retaining a basis of Latin rock, Carlos Santana's increasing involvement with guru Sri Chinmoy took the band further into more esoteric music, which continued for many years, although never quite losing the initial Latin influence.

Santana signed with Columbia and released their self-titled debut album Santana. This album reached fourth place on the Billboard 200 and earned two-times platinum status by the American national certification. Next, Santana released Abraxas, in September 1970, which topped the Billboard charts and earned five-times platinum. Santana released another twelve albums in the 1970s, each earning RIAA certifications, and their success continued in the 1980s. The band's quietest period was from 1984 through 1994, with no certified albums. After signing with Arista, the group released the very successful Supernatural, which reached number one in several countries, earned 15-times platinum and sold nearly 27 million copies worldwide. Their most recent album is 2021's Blessings and Miracles.

Over a career spanning 50 years, Santana exemplified Latin rock, while diversifying into other genres. Santana had sold over 100 million records as of 2010, along with ten Grammy Awards and three Latin Grammy Awards. Four albums reached number one on the Billboard charts (Abraxas, Santana III, Supernatural, Shaman) along with two number one singles ("Smooth", "Maria Maria").

== Albums ==
=== Studio albums ===
Title	Details	Peak chart positions										Certifications
Title	Details	US	AUS	AUT	FRA	NLD	NZL	NOR	SWE	SWI	UK	Certifications
Santana	Released: August 30, 1969; Label: Columbia; Format: LP, CD	4	14	—	5	5	—	19	—	—	34	US: 2× Platinum
Abraxas	Released: September 23, 1970; Label: Columbia; Format: LP, CD, CC	1	1	—	7	7	—	3	—	—	7	CAN: 3× Platinum; FRA: Platinum; UK: Gold; US: 5× Platinum
Santana III	Released: September 1971; Label: Columbia; Format: LP, CD	1	4	—	—	3	—	3	—	—	6	US: 2× Platinum
Caravanserai	Released: October 11, 1972; Label: Columbia; Format: LP, CD	8	16	—	—	3	—	10	—	—	6	CAN: Gold; FRA: Gold; US: Platinum
Welcome	Released: November 9, 1973; Label: Columbia; Format: LP, CD	25	19	9	—	—	—	—	—	—	8	CAN: Gold; UK: Silver; US: Gold
Borboletta	Released: October 1974; Label: Columbia; Format: LP, CD	20	38	9	—	—	13	—	—	—	18	UK: Silver; US: Gold
Amigos	Released: March 26, 1976; Label: Columbia; Format: LP, CD	10	9	9	5	2	8	13	29	—	21	CAN: Gold; FRA: 2× Gold; NL: Gold; UK: Silver; US: Gold
Festival	Released: January 1977; Label: Columbia; Format: LP, CD	27	25	9	—	11	37	—	37	—	27	FRA: Gold; UK: Silver; US: Gold
Moonflower (studio / live)	Released: October 1977; Label: Columbia; Format: LP, CD, [8-track]	10	7	10	6	2	12	16	22	57	7	CAN: Gold; FRA: Platinum; GER: Gold; NL: Platinum; UK: Gold; US: 2× Platinum
Inner Secrets	Released: October 1978; Label: Columbia; Format: LP, CD	27	5	19	3	7	20	17	14	—	17	CAN: Gold; FRA: Gold; NZ: Gold; UK: Gold; US: Gold
Marathon	Released: September 1979; Label: Columbia; Format: LP, CD	25	9	—	5	21	14	14	15	—	28	FRA: Gold; UK: Silver; US: Gold
Zebop!	Released: April 29, 1981; Label: Columbia; Format: LP, CD	9	14	12	2	20	23	3	9	—	33	FRA: Gold; US: Platinum
Shangó	Released: August 1982; Label: Columbia; Format: LP, CD	22	33	9	—	26	13	3	12	—	35	US: Gold
Beyond Appearances	Released: February 1985; Label: Columbia; Format: LP, CD	50	57	24	—	44	—	11	20	9	58	
Freedom	Released: February 1987; Label: Columbia; Format: LP, CD	95	83	16	—	—	—	16	22	8	—	
Spirits Dancing in the Flesh	Released: June 1990; Label: Columbia; Format: LP, CD	85	105	28	—	66	—	—	—	19	68	
Milagro	Released: May 1992; Label: Polydor; Format: CD, CC	102	151	31	41	51	—	—	—	11	—	
Supernatural	Released: June 15, 1999; Label: Arista; Format: CD	1	1	1	1	1	1	1	1	1	1	AUS: 4× Platinum; AUT: 2× Platinum; CAN: Diamond; FRA: 2× Platinum; NLD: 2× Platinum; NZ: 4× Platinum; SWE: Platinum; SWI: 4× Platinum; UK: 2× Platinum; US: Diamond (15× Platinum)
Shaman	Released: October 22, 2002; Label: Arista; Format: CD	1	11	4	2	3	8	6	15	1	15	AUS: Platinum; AUT: Platinum; FRA: Platinum; NL: Gold; NZ: Platinum; NOR: Gold; SWI: 2× Platinum; UK: Silver; US: 2× Platinum
All That I Am	Released: October 31, 2005; Label: Arista; Format: CD	2	36	6	19	20	12	18	29	5	36	AUT: Gold; SWI: Gold; US: Gold
Guitar Heaven: The Greatest Guitar Classics of All Time	Released: September 21, 2010; Label: Arista; Format: CD	5	5	5	9	24	2	9	17	5	15	ARIA: Gold
Shape Shifter	Released: May 14, 2012; Label: Starfaith; Format: CD	16	55	29	71	63	—	—	—	8	49	
Corazón	Released: May 6, 2014; Label: RCA/Sony Latin Iberia; Format: CD, digital download	9	67	5	96	36	—	—	—	14	58	US: 2× Platinum (Latin)
Santana IV	Released: April 15, 2016; Label: Santana IV Records; Format: CD, digital download, vinyl	5	11	11	29	7	8	24	29	7	4	
Africa Speaks	Release date: June 7, 2019; Label: Concord; Format: CD, digital download, vinyl	3	55	9	50	63	—	—	—	6	35	
Blessings and Miracles	Release date: October 15, 2021; Label: Starfaith, BMG Rights Management; Format: CD, digital download, vinyl	—	—	13	89	—	—	—	—	15	—	
"—" denotes a recording that did not chart or was not released in that territory.

=== Live albums ===
Title	Details	Peak chart positions										Certifications
Title	Details	US	AUS	AUT	FRA	NLD	NZL	NOR	SWE	SWI	UK	Certifications
Lotus	Released: May 1974; Label: CBS/Sony; Format: 3LP, 2CD, 3CD, 3SACD	—	49	—	—	15	21	—	—	—	—	
Moonflower (studio / live)	Released: October 1977; Label: Columbia; Format: LP, CD, [8-track]	10	7	10	6	2	12	16	22	57	7	FRA: Platinum; NLD: Platinum; UK: Gold; US: 2× Platinum
Sacred Fire: Live in South America	Released: October 19, 1993; Label: Polydor; Format: LP, CD	181	142	—	23	—	—	—	—	—	—	
Live at the Fillmore 1968	Released: March 11, 1997; Label: Columbia; Format: CD, Cassette	—	—	—	—	—	—	—	—	—	—	
The Very Best of Santana – Live in 1968	Released: 2007; Label: Mastersong; Format: LP, CD	—	—	—	—	—	—	—	—	—	—	
The Woodstock Experience	Released: June 30, 2009; Label: Sony BMG / Legacy; Format: LP, CD	—	—	—	—	—	—	—	—	—	—	
Corazón – Live from Mexico: Live It to Believe It	Released: September 9, 2014; Label: Sony BMG / Legacy; Format: CD+DVD-Video, Blu-ray+CD	—	—	—	—	—	—	—	—	—	—	
Santana IV: Live at the House of Blues, Las Vegas	Released: October 21, 2016; Label: Eagle Rock; Format: CD, LP, DVD-Video, Blu-ray+CD	—	—	—	—	—	—	—	—	87	—	
"—" denotes a recording that did not chart or was not released in that territory.

=== Compilation albums ===
Title	Details	Peak chart positions										Certifications
Title	Details	US	AUS	AUT	FRA	NLD	NZL	NOR	SWE	SWI	UK	Certifications
Santana's Greatest Hits	Released: July 1974; Label: Columbia; Format: LP, CD	17	50	4	—	19	—	—	—	—	14	FRA: 2× Gold; GER: Platinum; UK: Gold; US: 7× Platinum
25 Hits	Released: 1978; Label: Columbia; Format: LP	—	—	—	—	7	—	—	—	—	—	FRA: Gold
Viva! Santana – The Very Best	Released: 1986; Label: K-Tel; Format: LP, CD	—	101	—	—	—	—	—	—	—	50	
The Very Best of Santana	Released: 1986; Label: Arcade; Format: LP	—	—	—	—	59	—	—	—	—	—	
Viva Santana!	Released: August 1988; Label: Columbia; Format: LP, CD	142	—	—	—	—	—	—	—	—	—	US: Gold
The Very Best of Santana	Released: 1990; Label: Arcade; Format: CD; Re-packaging of the 1986 release	—	—	—	—	20	—	—	—	—	—	
The Best of Santana	Released: 1991; Label: Sony; Format: CD	—	—	—	7	—	38	—	—	—	—	FRA: Platinum
The Definitive Collection	Released: 1992; Label: Sony; Format: LP, CD	—	—	—	—	—	—	—	—	—	—	NLD: Gold
Dance of the Rainbow Serpent	Released: August 8, 1995; Label: Sony; Format: LP, CD	—	—	—	—	—	—	—	—	—	—	
Love Songs	Released: 1995; Label: Sony; Format: CD	—	—	—	—	—	—	—	—	—	—	
The Very Best of Santana	Released: January 1996; Label: Sony; Format: LP, CD	—	106	—	—	—	—	—	—	—	—	
Summer Dreams – The Best Ballads of Santana	Released: 1997; Label: Sony; Format: CD	—	—	—	—	—	—	2	—	—	—	NOR: Gold
The Ultimate Collection	Released: 1997; Label: Sony; Format: LP, CD	—	57	—	14	5	—	9	13	48	12	FRA: 2× Gold; NLD: Platinum; UK: Gold
The Best of Santana	Released: March 1998; Label: Sony; Format: CD	82	—	—	—	—	—	—	—	—	—	US: Platinum
Best Instrumentals	Released: 1998; Label: Sony; Format: LP, CD	—	—	—	—	—	—	—	—	—	—	
Best Instrumentals Vol. 2	Released: September 28, 1999; Label: Sony; Format: LP, CD	—	—	—	—	—	—	—	—	—	—	
The Best of Santana Vol. 2	Released: November 21, 2000; Label: Sony; Format: CD	—	—	—	—	—	—	—	—	—	—	
The Essential Santana	Released: October 22, 2002; Label: Sony; Format: CD	125	122	—	22	—	—	—	—	40	—	US: Gold
Relaxin' with Santana	Released: 2003; Label: Sony; Format: CD	—	—	—	—	—	—	—	—	67	—	
Ceremony: Remixes & Rarities	Released: December 2003; Label: Arista; Format: LP, CD	—	—	—	—	—	—	—	—	—	—	
Love Songs	Released: 2004; Label: Sony; Format: CD	—	—	—	—	—	—	—	—	—	—	
Santana 3CD Box	Released: 2004; Label: Eurotrend; Format: CD	—	—	—	—	—	—	—	—	—	—	
Ultimate Santana	Released: October 16, 2007; Label: Arista; Format: CD	8	6	28	11	68	3	7	—	13	16	AUS: 2× Platinum; NZL: Platinum; SWI: Gold; US: Gold
Multi-Dimensional Warrior	Released: October 14, 2008; Label: Columbia, Legacy; Format: LP, CD	—	—	—	—	—	—	—	—	—	—	
Carnaval: The Best of Santana	Released: 2009; Label: Sony; Format: CD	—	—	—	—	—	—	—	—	—	—	
Playlist: The Very Best of Santana	Released: April 14, 2015; Label: Columbia, Arista, Legacy; Format: CD	—	—	—	—	—	—	—	—	—	—	
Sentient	Released: March 28, 2025; Label: Candid Records; LP, digital download	—	—	—	—	—	—	—	—	—	—	
"—" denotes a recording that did not chart or was not released in that territory.

=== Collaboration albums ===
Title	Details
Woodstock	Released: May 1970; Label: Cotillion, Atlantic; Format: LP
Fillmore: The Last Days	Released: 1972; Label: Columbia; Format: LP
The Guitars That Destroyed the World	Released: 1972; Label: Columbia; Format: LP
California Jam II	Released: March 18, 1978; Label: Columbia; Format: LP
Pioneers of the New Age	Released: 1988; Label: Sony; Format: LP
Girlfight: Music from the Motion Picture	Released: September 26, 2000; Label: Capitol; Format: CD
Platinum Christmas	Released: November 14, 2000; Label: Jive Records; Format: CD
Primavera	Released: July 24, 2001; Label: RCA; Format: CD
Dirty Dancing: Havana Nights	Released: February 17, 2004; Label: J Records; Format: CD
Power of Soul: A Tribute to Jimi Hendrix	Released: May 4, 2004; Label: Image Entertainment; Format: CD
We Are the Future	Released: June 1, 2004; Label: Image Entertainment; Format: CD
Food for Thought	Released: July 13, 2004; Label: BMG; Format: CD
Possibilities	Released (UK): August 29, 2005; Released (US): August 30, 2005; Label: Vector Records, Hear Music; Format: CD
Re-Machined: A Tribute to Deep Purple's Machine Head	Released: September 25, 2012; Label: Eagle Rock; Format: CD, LP, digital download
Power of Peace	Released: 2017; Label: Legacy Recordings; Format: CD, LP, digital download

== Extended plays ==
List of extended plays, with selected details
Title	Details
In Search of Mona Lisa	Released: January 25, 2019; Label: Concord; Formats: CD, digital download

== Singles ==
Title	Year	Peak chart positions										Certifications	Album
Title	Year	US	US Rock	US AC	US Adult Pop	AUS	NLD	GER	NZL	SWI	UK	Certifications	Album
"Jingo"	1969	56	—	—	—	—	4	39	—	—	—		Santana
"Evil Ways"	1969	9	—	19	—	59	13	—	—	—	—		Santana
"Soul Sacrifice"	1970	—	—	—	—	—	16	—	—	—	—		Santana
"Black Magic Woman"	1970	4	—	29	—	15	—	14	—	—	—	UK: Silver; NZ: Platinum	Abraxas
"Oye Cómo Va"	1971	13	—	11	—	13	16	29	—	—	—		Abraxas
"Hope You're Feeling Better"	1971	—	—	—	—	—	—	—	—	—	—		Abraxas
"Everybody's Everything"	1971	12	—	—	—	—	20	50	—	—	—		Santana III
"No One to Depend On"	1972	36	—	—	—	—	—	—	—	—	—		Santana III
"Samba Pa Ti"	1973	—	—	—	—	—	11	43	—	—	27		Abraxas
"Song of the Wind"	1974	—	—	—	—	—	—	—	—	—	—		Caravanserai
"When I Look Into Your Eyes"	1974	102	—	—	—	—	—	—	—	—	—		Welcome
"Europa (Earth's Cry Heaven's Smile)"	1976	—	—	—	—	—	29	—	—	6	—		Amigos
"Let It Shine"	1976	77	—	—	—	60	—	—	—	—	—		Amigos
"Dance Sister Dance (Baila Mi Hermana)"	1976	—	—	—	—	—	—	—	—	—	—		Amigos
"Let the Children Play"	1976	102	—	—	—	—	—	—	—	—	—		Festival
"Revelations"	1976	—	—	—	—	—	—	—	—	—	—		Festival
"She's Not There"	1977	27	—	—	—	19	3	—	9	—	11		Moonflower
"I'll Be Waiting"	1977	—	—	—	—	—	18	—	—	—	—		Moonflower
"Well All Right"	1978	69	—	—	—	20	16	—	37	—	53		Inner Secrets
"Stormy"	1979	32	—	19	—	99	—	—	38	—	—		Inner Secrets
"One Chain (Don't Make No Prison)"	1979	59	—	—	—	—	—	—	—	—	—		Inner Secrets
"Open Invitation"	1979	—	—	—	—	—	—	—	—	—	—		Inner Secrets
"You Know That I Love You"	1979	35	—	—	—	89	—	—	—	—	—		Marathon
"Aqua Marine"	1979	—	—	—	—	—	—	—	—	—	—		Marathon
"All I Ever Wanted"	1980	—	—	—	—	—	—	—	—	—	57		Marathon
"Changes"	1981	—	45	—	—	—	—	—	—	—	—		Zebop!
"Searchin'"	1981	—	26	—	—	—	—	—	—	—	—		Zebop!
"Winning"	1981	17	2	—	—	88	—	—	—	—	—		Zebop!
"The Sensitive Kind"	1981	56	—	—	—	—	—	—	—	—	—		Zebop!
"I Love You Much Too Much"	1981	—	—	—	—	—	—	—	—	—	—		Zebop!
"Hold On"	1982	15	17	34	—	64	22	—	31	—	—		Shangó
"Nowhere to Run"	1982	66	13	—	—	—	—	—	—	—	—		Shangó
"Night Hunting Time"	1982	—	34	—	—	—	—	—	—	—	—		Shangó
"Say It Again"	1985	46	15	—	—	39	33	—	—	—	—		Beyond Appearances
"I'm the One Who Loves You"	1985	102	—	—	—	—	—	—	—	—	—		Beyond Appearances
"Veracruz"	1987	—	21	—	—	—	—	—	—	—	—		Freedom
"The Healer" (John Lee Hooker featuring Santana)	1990	—	—	—	—	102	9	—	23	—	—		The Healer (John Lee Hooker album)
"Gypsy Woman"	1990	—	—	31	—	—	—	—	—	—	—		Spirits Dancing in the Flesh
"Somewhere in Heaven"	1992	—	—	—	—	—	—	—	—	—	—		Milagro
"Smooth" (featuring Rob Thomas)	1999	1	10	11	1	4	40	21	18	18	3	AUS: 2× Platinum; NZ: 2× Platinum; UK: Platinum; US: Platinum	Supernatural
"Put Your Lights On" (featuring Everlast)	1999	— (Note: "Put Your Lights On" did not enter the Billboard Hot 100, but peaked at number 18 on the Bubbling Under Hot 100 Singles chart.)	8	—	—	32	—	92	—	87	97		Supernatural
"Maria Maria" (featuring The Product G&B and Wyclef Jean)	1999	1	—	—	12	49	2	1	49	1	6	GER: Platinum; NLD: Gold; NZ: 3× Platinum; SWE: Gold; SWI: Platinum; UK: Platinum; US: Platinum	Supernatural
"Love of My Life" (featuring Dave Matthews)	2000	—	—	—	39	—	—	—	—	—	—		Supernatural
"Corazón Espinado" (featuring Maná)	2000	—	—	—	—	160	89	64	—	39	—		Supernatural
"Primavera" (Note: The main version of "Primavera" failed to chart, but the version featuring Jerry Rivera peaked at number twenty-three on the Latin Tropical Airplay chart)	2001	—	—	—	—	—	—	—	—	—	—		Supernatural
"The Game of Love" (featuring Michelle Branch)	2002	5	—	1	1	21	23	46	7	20	16	US: Gold; NZ: Gold	Shaman
"You Are My Kind" (featuring Seal)	2002	—	—	—	—	—	—	—	—	—	—		Shaman
"Nothing at All" (featuring Musiq)	2003	—	—	—	—	—	—	—	—	74	—		Shaman
"Feels Like Fire" (featuring Dido)	2003	—	—	—	—	—	—	—	26	—	—		Shaman
"Hoy Es Adios"	2003	—	—	—	—	—	—	—	—	—	—		Shaman
"Why Don't You & I" (featuring Alex Band or Chad Kroeger)	2003	8	—	16	1	—	—	76	21	—	—		Shaman
"I'm Feeling You" (featuring Michelle Branch and The Wreckers)	2005	55	—	5	6	—	—	—	—	—	—		All That I Am
"Just Feel Better" (featuring Steven Tyler)	2005	— (Note: "Just Feel Better" did not enter the Billboard Hot 100, but peaked at number seven on the Bubbling Under Hot 100 Singles chart.)	37	28	13	7	58	44	—	39	77		All That I Am
"Cry Baby Cry" (featuring Sean Paul and Joss Stone)	2005	—	—	—	—	—	63	47	—	29	71		All That I Am
"Into the Night" (featuring Chad Kroeger)	2007	26	—	20	2	4	—	19	24	49	—	AUS: Gold; US: Platinum; NZ: Gold	Ultimate Santana
"This Boy's Fire" (featuring Jennifer Lopez and Baby Bash)	2008	—	—	—	—	—	—	—	—	—	—		Ultimate Santana
"Ya Yo Me Curé"	2010	—	—	—	—	—	—	—	—	—	—		Supernatural (Legacy Edition)
"While My Guitar Gently Weeps" (featuring India.Arie and Yo-Yo Ma)	2010	—	—	24	—	—	—	—	—	46	—		Guitar Heaven: The Greatest Guitar Classics of All Time
"Photograph" (featuring Chris Daughtry)	2010	—	30	—	—	—	—	—	—	—	—		Guitar Heaven: The Greatest Guitar Classics of All Time
"Fortunate Son" (featuring Scott Stapp)	2010	—	21	—	90	—	11	—	—	—	—		Guitar Heaven: The Greatest Guitar Classics of All Time
"Under the Bridge" (featuring Andy Vargas)	2010	—	—	—	19	—	—	—	—	—	—		Guitar Heaven: The Greatest Guitar Classics of All Time
"Dance the Night Away" (featuring Pat Monahan)	2010	—	18	87	—	—	—	—	—	—	—		Guitar Heaven: The Greatest Guitar Classics of All Time
"Sunshine of Your Love" (featuring Rob Thomas)	2011	—	44	—	—	—	—	11	—	—	—		Guitar Heaven: The Greatest Guitar Classics of All Time
"La Flaca" (featuring Juanes)	2014	—	10	—	—	—	—	—	—	—	—		Corazón
"Anywhere You Want to Go"	2016	—	—	—	—	—	—	—	—	—	—		Santana IV
"Breaking Down the Door"	2019	—	—	—	—	—	—	—	—	—	—		Africa Speaks
"Move" (featuring Rob Thomas and American Authors)	2021	—	—	11	23	—	—	—	—	—	—		Blessings and Miracles
"—" denotes a recording that did not chart or was not released in that territory.

== Other charted songs ==
List of charting deep cuts
Title	Year	Peak	Album
Title	Year	IT Air.	Album
"Africa Bamba"	1999	9	Supernatural

== See also ==
- Carlos Santana discography
- Santana videography
