= The Essential Santana =

Greatest hits album by Santana
- Released: October 22, 2002
- Recorded: May 12, 1969 – 1989
- Genre: Rock; Latin rock; Latin
- Length: 146:00
- Label: Columbia; Legacy
- Producer: Various

Santana chronology
The Best of Santana Vol. 2 (2000)	The Essential Santana (2002)	Shaman (2002)

Professional ratings
Review scores
Source	Rating
Allmusic	4/5 stars
Robert Christgau	(not rated)
Rolling Stone	2/5 stars

The Essential Santana is a compilation album by Santana, released on October 22, 2002. The collection is part of a series of Essential sets released by Columbia Records.

Uniquely among Santana compilations, "Soul Sacrifice" is included in the studio version from their first album, not the live performance from Woodstock.

The compilation contains no songs from the highly successful Supernatural album, despite it being released 3 years before this album. This is because Columbia and Santana's current label Arista Records were not under common ownership at the time. In 2013, Sony issued another "Essential Santana" 2-CD set which truncates the original's repertoire and does include music from the Arista era, as well as the live Woodstock version of "Soul Sacrifice".

== Track listing ==
=== Disc one ===
1. "Jingo" (Babatunde Olatunji) – 4:22
2. "Evil Ways" (Clarence "Sonny" Henry) – 3:56
3. "Soul Sacrifice" (Carlos Santana, Gregg Rolie, David Brown, Marcus Malone) – 6:36
  - Tracks 1–3 from Santana, 1969
4. "Black Magic Woman/Gypsy Queen" (Peter Green/Gábor Szabó) – 5:19
5. "Oye Como Va" (Tito Puente) – 4:17
6. "Samba Pa Ti" (Santana) – 4:46
  - Tracks 4–6 from Abraxas, 1970
7. "Everybody's Everything" (Brown, Tyrone Moss, Santana) – 3:32
8. "No One to Depend On" (Michael Carabello, Coke Escovedo, Rolie) – 5:24
9. "Toussaint l'Overture" (José Areas, Brown, Carabello, Rolie, Santana, Michael Shrieve) – 5:56
10. "Guajira" (Areas, Brown, Rico Reyes) – 5:44
  - Tracks 7–10 from Santana III, 1971
11. "La Fuente del Ritmo" (Mingo Lewis) – 4:33
  - from Caravanserai, 1972
12. "In a Silent Way" (Joe Zawinul, Miles Davis) – 7:58
  - Live at the Fillmore West, San Francisco, California, July 4, 1971
  - Previously featured on the compilation Fillmore: The Last Days, 1972
13. "Love, Devotion and Surrender" (Richard Kermode, Santana) – 3:38
  - from Welcome, 1973
14. "Mirage" (Leon Patillo) – 4:43
  - from Borboletta, 1974
15. "Carnaval" (Tom Coster, Santana) – 2:15
16. "Let the Children Play" (Patillo, Santana) – 3:28
17. "Jugando" (Areas, Santana) – 2:12
  - Tracks 15–17 from Festivál, 1977

=== Disc two ===
1. "She's Not There" (Rod Argent) – 4:09
  - from Moonflower, 1977
2. "Dance Sister Dance (Baila Mi Hermana)" – (Leon "Ndugu" Chancler, Coster, David Rubinson) – 8:00
  - Live at California Jam II; originally from Amigos, 1976
3. "Europa (Earth's Cry Heaven's Smile)" (Coster, Santana) – 5:05
  - from Amigos, 1976
4. "Stormy" (Buddy Buie, James Cobb) – 4:47
5. "Well All Right" (Jerry Allison, Buddy Holly, Joe B. Mauldin, Norman Petty) – 4:09
6. "Open Invitation" (Dennis Lambert, David Margen, Brian Potter, Santana, Greg Walker) – 4:45
  - Tracks 4–6 from Inner Secrets, 1978
7. "Aqua Marine" (Alan Pasqua, Santana) – 5:35
8. "You Know That I Love You" (Alex Ligertwood, Pasqua, Santana, Chris Solberg) – 3:57
9. "All I Ever Wanted" (Ligertwood, Santana, Solberg) – 3:35
  - Tracks 7–9 from Marathon, 1979
10. "Winning" (Russ Ballard) – 3:29
  - from Zebop!, 1981
11. "Hold On" (Ian Thomas) – 4:36
12. "Nowhere to Run" (Ballard) – 2:53
  - Tracks 11–12 from Shangó, 1982
13. "Say It Again" (Val Garay, Steve Goldstein, Anthony LaPeau) – 3:28
  - from Beyond Appearances, 1985
14. "Veracruz" (Jeffrey Cohen, Buddy Miles, Rolie, Santana, Chester D. Thompson) – 3:46
  - from Freedom, 1987
15. "Blues for Salvador" (Santana, Thompson) – 5:57
  - from Blues for Salvador, 1987
16. "The Healer" (John Lee Hooker, Roy Rogers, Santana, Thompson) – 5:38
  - with John Lee Hooker; from The Healer, 1989

== Charts ==
Chart (2002)	Peak position
Australian Albums (ARIA)	122
Portuguese Albums (AFP)	20
Swiss Albums (Schweizer Hitparade)	40
US Billboard 200	124

== Certifications ==
Region	Certification	Certified units/sales
United States (RIAA)	Gold	500,000^{^}
^{^} Shipments figures based on certification alone.
