= Dance of the Rainbow Serpent =

Box set by Santana
- Released: January 1995
- Genre: Blues rock, hard rock, latin rock
- Label: Sony Records
- Producer: Various

Professional ratings
Review scores
Source	Rating
Allmusic	3/5 stars
The Rolling Stone Album Guide	4/5 stars

Dance of the Rainbow Serpent is a 1995 three-CD retrospective box set by Santana that also covers Carlos Santana solo projects and appearances with other artists. Unless noted, all tracks are studio recordings, with some of them previously unreleased (all are on the third disc). The individual discs are sub-titled Heart, Soul, and Spirit. It includes a 60-page booklet with detailed track listing, song comments by Carlos Santana, musician credits, biographical essay and a poem by Hal Miller, a list of touring band members through the years, and a band/solo discography up to 1995. The cover art was done by Michael Rios and Anthony Machado.

== Track listing ==
=== Disc 1 - Heart ===
No.	Title	Writer(s)	Original album	Length
1.	"Evil Ways"	Clarence "Sonny" Henry	Santana, 1969	3:58
2.	"Soul Sacrifice" (Live at the Woodstock Festival, Bethel, New York, Saturday, August 16, 1969; edited version)	Carlos Santana, Gregg Rolie, David Brown, Marcus Malone	Viva Santana!, 1988; originally from Santana	8:50
3.	"Black Magic Woman/Gypsy Queen"	Peter Green/Gábor Szabó	Abraxas, 1970	5:17
4.	"Oye Como Va"	Tito Puente	Abraxas	4:18
5.	"Samba Pa Ti" (Instrumental)	Santana	Abraxas	4:45
6.	"Everybody's Everything"	Santana, Milton Brown, Tyrone Moss	Santana III, 1971	3:31
7.	"Song of the Wind"	Rolie, Santana, Neal Schon	Caravanserai, 1972	6:10
8.	"Toussaint L'Overture" (Live at the Osaka Koseinenkin Hall, Osaka, Japan, July 1973)	José Areas, Brown, Michael Carabello, Rolie, Santana, Schon, Michael Shrieve	Lotus, 1974; originally from Santana III	7:33
9.	"In a Silent Way" (Live at the Fillmore West, San Francisco, California, July 4, 1971)	Joe Zawinul	Fillmore: The Last Days, 1972	7:54
10.	"Waves Within"	Doug Rauch, Rolie	Caravanserai	3:54
11.	"Flame - Sky"	Rauch, Santana, John McLaughlin	Welcome, 1973	11:31
12.	"Naima"	John Coltrane	Love Devotion Surrender, 1973	3:12

=== Disc 2 - Soul ===
No.	Title	Writer(s)	Original album	Length
1.	"I Love You Much Too Much"	Alexander Olshanetsky, Don Raye, Chaim Towber	Zebop!, 1981	4:45
2.	"Blues for Salvador"	Santana, Chester D. Thompson	Blues for Salvador, 1987	5:57
3.	"Aqua Marine"	Alan Pasqua, Santana	Marathon, 1979	5:38
4.	"Bella"	Sterling Crew, Santana, Thompson	Blues for Salvador	4:30
5.	"The River"	Leon Patillo, Santana	Festivál, 1976	4:52
6.	"I'll Be Waiting"	Santana	Moonflower, 1977	5:20
7.	"Love Is You"	Santana, Thompson	Freedom, 1987	4:00
8.	"Europa (Earth's Cry Heaven's Smile)"	Tom Coster, Santana	Amigos, 1976	5:05
9.	"Move On"	Santana, Chris Rhyne	Inner Secrets, 1978	4:27
10.	"Somewhere in Heaven"	Alex Ligertwood, Santana	Milagro, 1992	3:26
11.	"Open Invitation"	Dennis Lambert, David Margen, Brian Potter, Santana, Greg Walker	Inner Secrets	4:46

=== Disc 3 - Spirit ===
No.	Title	Writer(s)	Original	Length
1.	"All I Ever Wanted"	Ligertwood, Santana, Chris Solberg	Marathon	4:02
2.	"Hannibal"	Ligertwood, Alan Pasqua, Raul Rékow, Santana	Blues for Salvador	4:29
3.	"Brightest Star"	Ligertwood, Santana	Zebop!	4:51
4.	"Wings of Grace" (Live in Mexico City, May 22 or 23, 1993)	Santana, Thompson	Sacred Fire: Live in Mexico (video), 1993	5:27
5.	"Se Eni a Fe L'Amo-Kere Kere" (with Babatunde Olatunji)	Olatunji	Dance to the Beat of My Drum, 1986	9:14
6.	"Mudbone"	Santana	Havana Moon, 1983	5:52
7.	"The Healer" (with John Lee Hooker)	Hooker, Roy Rogers, Santana, Thompson	The Healer, 1989	5:38
8.	"Chill Out (Things Gonna Change)" (with John Lee Hooker)	Hooker, Santana, Thompson	Chill Out, 1995	4:46
9.	"Sweet Black Cherry Pie" (with Larry Graham)	Santana, Thompson, Ligertwood	Previously unissued outtake from Spirits Dancing in the Flesh, 1990	3:00
10.	"Every Now and Then" (with Vernon Reid)	Reid	Previously unissued; recorded 1990	5:06
11.	"This Is This" (with Weather Report)	Zawinul	This Is This, 1986	7:09
