= The Best of Santana =

Greatest hits album by Santana
- Released: March 1998
- Genre: Blues rock, hard rock, latin rock
- Length: 1:16:46
- Label: Columbia
- Producer: Various

Santana chronology
Live at the Fillmore 1968 (1997)	The Best of Santana (1998)	Supernatural (1999)

The Best of Santana is a 1998 album by Santana and a companion album to 2000's The Best of Santana Vol. 2. The album peaked at #82 on the Billboard 200, and has sold 1.64 million copies in the U.S. as of May 2009.

== Track listing ==
No.	Title	Writer(s)	Original album	Length
1.	"Jingo"	Babatunde Olatunji	Santana, 1969	4:14
2.	"Evil Ways"	Clarence "Sonny" Henry	Santana	3:54
3.	"Black Magic Woman/Gypsy Queen"	Peter Green/Gábor Szabó	Abraxas, 1970	5:19
4.	"Oye Como Va"	Tito Puente	Abraxas	4:16
5.	"Samba Pa Ti" (Instrumental)	Carlos Santana	Abraxas	4:47
6.	"She's Not There" (The Zombies cover)	Rod Argent	Moonflower, 1977	4:09
7.	"No One to Depend On"	Michael Carabello, Coke Escovedo, Gregg Rolie	Santana III, 1971	5:32
8.	"Open Invitation"	Dennis Lambert, David Margen, Brian Potter, Santana, Greg Walker	Inner Secrets, 1978	4:45
9.	"Hold On"	Ian Thomas	Shangó, 1982	4:22
10.	"Bella"	Sterling Crew, Santana, Chester D. Thompson	Blues for Salvador, 1987	4:30
11.	"Winning"	Russ Ballard	Zebop!, 1981	3:18
12.	"All I Ever Wanted"	Alex Ligertwood, Santana, Chris Solberg	Marathon, 1979	4:03
13.	"Dance Sister Dance (Baila Mi Hermana)"	Leon "Ndugu" Chancler, Tom Coster, David Rubinson	Amigos, 1976	8:15
14.	"Europa (Earth's Cry Heaven's Smile)"	Coster, Santana	Amigos	5:06
15.	"Everybody's Everything"	David Brown, Tyrone Moss, Santana	Santana III	3:30
16.	"Soul Sacrifice"	Santana, Gregg Rolie, Brown, Marcus Malone	Santana	6:35

== Charts ==
Chart (1993)	Peak position
French Albums (SNEP)	7
German Albums (Offizielle Top 100)	49
New Zealand Albums (RMNZ)	38

Chart (1996)	Peak position
UK Albums (OCC)	99

Chart (1998)	Peak position
US Billboard 200	82

Chart (2007)	Peak position
Spanish Albums (PROMUSICAE)	85

== Certifications ==
Region	Certification	Certified units/sales
France (SNEP)	Platinum	300,000^{*}
United States (RIAA)	Platinum	1,640,000
^{*} Sales figures based on certification alone.
