= Raul Rekow =

American musician (1954–2015)

Raul Matthew Rekow (June 10, 1954 – November 1, 2015) was an American conguero and percussionist. From 1976 to 2013, he played for the rock band Santana.

== Biography ==
Raul Matthew Rekow was born on June 10, 1954, in San Francisco, California. The family name Rekow stems from his German grandfather, who came from Coburg, Germany. As a kid, Raul started playing trumpet and French horn, but eventually started playing drum set. In 1967, he saw Santana perform at the Cow Palace which inspired him to switch to the congas.

At the age of 15, he covered Santana songs with a band named Soul Sacrifice. In 1970, he joined Malo, the band of Carlos Santana's younger brother, Jorge. From 1972 until 1976, Rekow played with Sapo, another Latin band in the Bay Area.

In 1976, Raul Rekow was called to participate in the recording sessions for the album Festivál by Santana to replace Armando Peraza who was sick. He then stayed a permanent member of Santana until the summer of 2013. During his tenure with Santana, he found collaborated with other musicians such as John Lee Hooker, Aretha Franklin, Patti LaBelle, Whitney Houston, Tramaine Hawkins, and Herbie Hancock. In 1985, he participated in a project named R.O.A.R. with Armando Peraza and other band members of Santana. In 1999, Rekow was part of the highly successful Santana album Supernatural, which was recognized with nine Grammy Awards.

Raul Rekow has a signature line of congas and bongos with the American manufacturer Latin Percussion.

== Discography ==
=== With Santana ===
- Festivál (1977)
- Moonflower (1977)
- Inner Secrets (1978)
- Marathon (1979)
- Zebop! (1981)
- Shangó (1982)
- Beyond Appearances (1985)
- Freedom (1987)
- Viva Santana! (1988)
- Spirits Dancing in the Flesh (1990)
- Milagro (1992)
- Sacred Fire (1993)
- Dance of the Rainbow Serpent (1995)
- Supernatural (1999)
- Shaman (2002)
- All That I Am (2005)
- Guitar Heaven (2010)
- Shape Shifter (2012)

=== With Carlos Santana ===
- Oneness (1979)
- Havana Moon (1983)
- Blues for Salvador (1987)

=== With John Lee Hooker ===
- Mr. Lucky (1991)
- Chill Out (1995)
