= Multi-Dimensional Warrior =

Compilation album by Santana
- Released: October 14, 2008
- Genre: Latin rock
- Label: Sony

Alternative cover
- Back cover

Multi-Dimensional Warrior is a compilation album by guitarist Carlos Santana. This album combines hits from his early career. It was released on October 14, 2008.

== Track listing ==
Disc 1

#	Track	Released On	Length
1	"Let There Be Light"	Spirits Dancing in the Flesh, 1990	2:30
2	"Brotherhood"	Beyond Appearances, 1985	2:26
3	"Spirit"	Beyond Appearances	5:05
4	"Right Now"	Beyond Appearances	5:58
5	"Life Is for Living"	Milagro, 1992	4:41
6	"Saja/Right On"	Milagro	8:51
7	"Somewhere in Heaven"	Milagro	3:25
8	"I Believe It's Time"	"Into the Night" single, 2007	4:20
9	"Serpents and Doves"	Food for Thought, 2004	5:03
10	"Your Touch"	Milagro	6:34
11	"I'll Be Waiting"	Moonflower, 1977	5:20
12	"The River"	Festival, 1977	4:53
13	"Bailando/Aquatic Park"	Blues for Salvador, 1987	5:46
14	"Praise"	Freedom, 1987	4:36

Disc 2

#	Track	Released On	Length
1	"Curación (Sunlight on Water)"	Ceremony: Remixes & Rarities, 2003	4:47
2	"Aqua Marine"	Marathon, 1979	5:35
3	"Bella"	Blues for Salvador	4:31
4	"Love Is You"	Freedom	3:54
5	"Full Moon"	Spirits Dancing in the Flesh	4:33
6	"Blues Latino"	Santana Brothers, 1994	5:53
7	"Samba Pa Ti"	Abraxas, 1970	4:47
8	"Europa (Earth's Cry Heaven's Smile)"	Amigos, 1976	5:06
9	"El Farol"	Supernatural, 1999	4:51
10	"En Aranjuez Con Tu Amor"	Santana Brothers	6:04
11	"Luz Amor y Vida"	Santana Brothers	5:08
12	"I Love You Much Too Much"	Zebop!, 1981	4:43
13	"Blues for Salvador"	Blues for Salvador	5:57
14	"Victory Is Won"	Shaman, 2002	5:20
