= The Ultimate Collection (Santana album) =

Compilation album by Santana
- Released: 1997
- Genre: Blues rock, hard rock, latin rock
- Label: Sony International
- Producer: Various

The Ultimate Collection is a 1997 compilation album by Santana. It is unique in that it includes material from the band's early Columbia days up to the 1992 Milagro release on Polydor. No other compilation album includes material from Milagro.

== Track listing ==
=== Disc 1 ===
1. "Jingo"
2. "Evil Ways"
3. "Soul Sacrifice"
4. "Black Magic Woman"
5. "Oye Como Va"
6. "Samba Pa Ti"
7. "Everybody's Everything"
8. "No One to Depend On"
9. "Song of the Wind"
10. "Love, Devotion and Surrender"
11. "Give and Take"
12. "Europa (Earth's Cry Heaven's Smile)"
13. "Dance Sister Dance (Baila Mi Hermana)"
14. "Let the Children Play"
15. "Revelations"
16. "She's Not There"
17. "I'll Be Waiting"
18. "Stormy"
19. "One Chain (Don't Make No Prison)"

=== Disc 2 ===
1. "Well...All Right"
2. "Open Invitation"
3. "Aqua Marine"
4. "All I Ever Wanted"
5. "You Know That I Love You"
6. "Winning"
7. "Sensitive Kind"
8. "Hold On"
9. "Nowhere to Run"
10. "What Does It Take (To Win Your Love)"
11. "Say It Again"
12. "How Long"
13. "I'm the One Who Loves You"
14. "Veracruz"
15. "Gypsy Woman"
16. "Right On"
17. "Havana Moon"
18. "Daughter of the Night"
19. "They All Went to Mexico"

=== Disc 3 ===
1. "Jingo" (Live)
2. "Soul Sacrifice" (Live at the Woodstock Festival, Bethel, New York, Saturday, August 16, 1969)
3. "Them Changes" (Live)
4. "Samba Pa Ti" (Live)
5. "Black Magic Woman/Gypsy Queen" (Live)
6. "She's Not There" (Live)
7. "Esperando" (Live)

== Charts ==
=== Weekly charts ===
Chart (1997–2002)	Peak position
Australian Albums (ARIA)	57
Belgian Albums (Ultratop Flanders)	8
Belgian Albums (Ultratop Wallonia)	17
Dutch Albums (Album Top 100)	5
Finnish Albums (Suomen virallinen lista)	4
French Albums (SNEP)	8
German Albums (Offizielle Top 100)	25
Hungarian Albums (MAHASZ)	33
Italian Albums (FIMI)	25
Norwegian Albums (VG-lista)	9
Scottish Albums (OCC)	17
Swedish Albums (Sverigetopplistan)	13
Swiss Albums (Schweizer Hitparade)	48
UK Albums (OCC)	12

=== Year-end charts ===
Chart (2000)	Position
Belgian Albums (Ultratop Flanders)	61
Belgian Albums (Ultratop Wallonia)	77
Dutch Albums (Album Top 100)	55
UK Albums (OCC)	93

Chart (2002)	Position
Dutch Albums (Album Top 100)	66

== Sales and certifications ==
Region	Certification	Certified units/sales
Finland (Musiikkituottajat)	Gold	24,276
France (SNEP)	2× Gold	200,000^{*}
Netherlands (NVPI)	Platinum	100,000^{^}
Switzerland (IFPI Switzerland)	Gold	25,000^{^}
United Kingdom (BPI)	Gold	100,000^{^}
^{*} Sales figures based on certification alone.^{^} Shipments figures based on certification alone.
