= The Definitive Collection (Santana album) =

Compilation album by Santana
- Released: 1992
- Genre: Blues rock, hard rock, latin rock
- Label: Sony International
- Producer: Various

The Definitive Collection is a compilation album by Santana.

== Track listing ==
=== Disc 1 ===
1. "Jingo"
2. "Evil Ways"
3. "Soul Sacrifice"
4. "Black Magic Woman/Gypsy Queen"
5. "Oye Como Va"
6. "Samba Pa Ti"
7. "Everybody's Everything"
8. "Song of the Wind"
9. "Let the Children Play"
10. "Europa (Earth's Cry Heaven's Smile)"
11. "She's Not There"
12. "I'll Be Waiting"
13. "Well...All Right"
14. "Hold On"
15. "They All Went to Mexico"
16. "Say It Again"

=== Disc 2 ===
1. "Hope You're Feeling Better"
2. "No One to Depend On"
3. "Stone Flower"
4. "One Chain (Don't Make No Prison)"
5. "Winning"
6. "Nowhere to Run"

== Certifications ==
Region	Certification	Certified units/sales
Netherlands (NVPI)	Gold	50,000^{^}
^{^} Shipments figures based on certification alone.
