= The Very Best of Santana =

Greatest hits album by Santana
- Released: 1996
- Genre: Blues rock, hard rock, latin rock
- Label: Sony International
- Producer: Various

The Very Best of Santana is a 1981/1990/1996 compilation album by Santana and an update of the 1974 album of the same name with the same cover art as this release. It's also a repackaged version of the versions released in 1981 and 1990, respectively.

== Track listing ==
1. "Europa (Earth's Cry Heaven's Smile)"
2. "Black Magic Woman/Gypsy Queen"
3. "Oye Como Va"
4. "Samba Pa Ti"
5. "Carnaval"
6. "She's Not There"
7. "Soul Sacrifice"
8. "Let the Children Play"
9. "Jugando"
10. "No One to Depend On"
11. "Evil Ways"
12. "Dance Sister Dance (Baila Mi Hermana)"
13. "Jin-Go-Lo-Ba"
14. "Everybody's Everything"
15. "Hold On"
16. "One Chain (Don't Make No Prison)"
17. "Lightning in the Sky"
18. "Aqua Marine"
19. "Chillout (Things Gonna Change)"

== Charts ==
Chart (1990–1993)	Peak position
Dutch Albums (Album Top 100)	20

Chart (1996)	Peak position
Australian Albums (ARIA)	106

Chart (1998)	Peak position
Belgian Albums (Ultratop Wallonia)	49
