= Tony Lindsay =

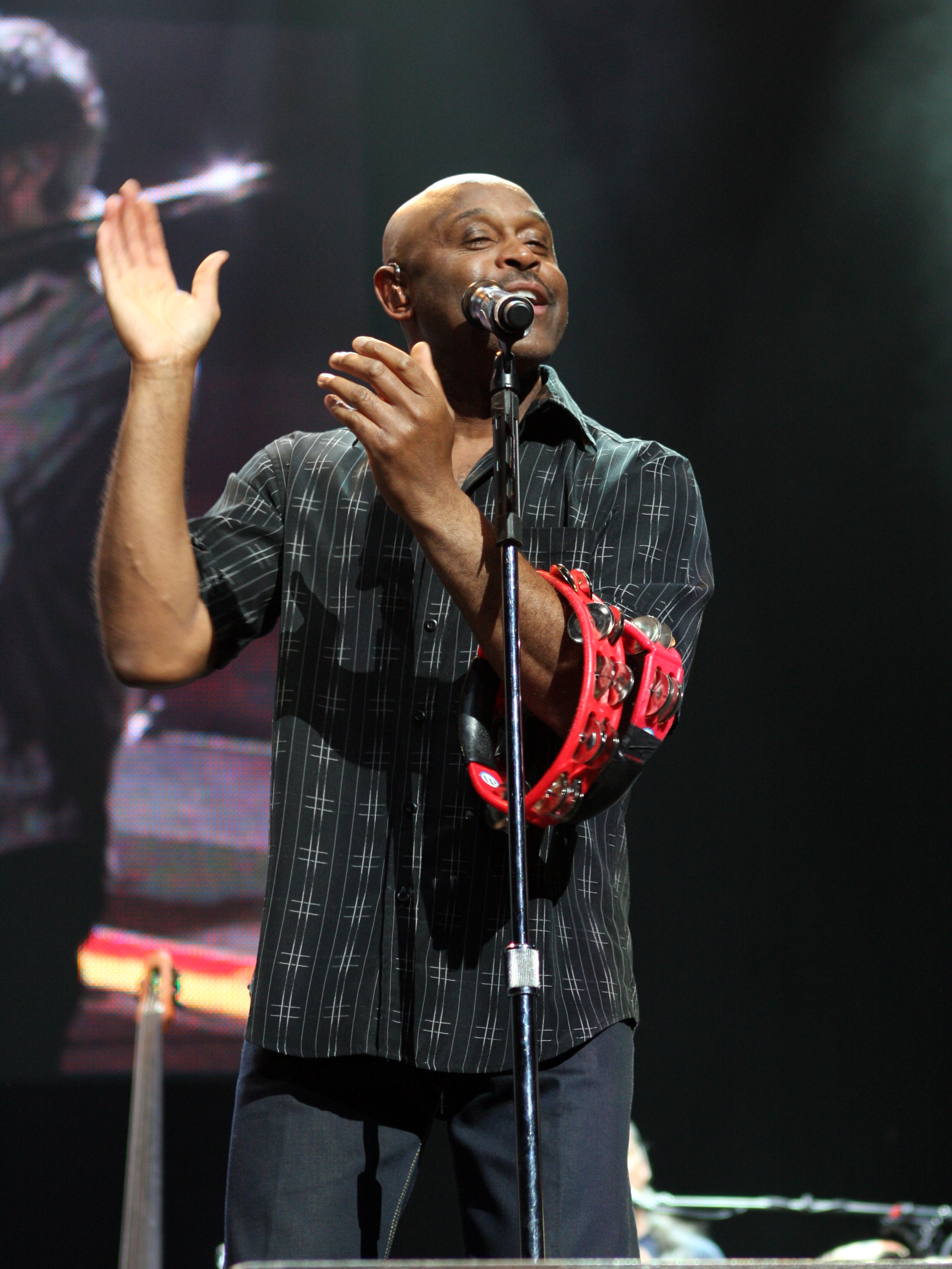
- Lindsay performing with Santana in 2011

Background information
- Born: Anthony Mark Lindsay; 1954 (age 71–72); Kingston, New York
- Genres: Jazz, soul, R&B
- Occupation: Musician
- Instrument: Vocals
- Years active: 1980–present
- Website: TonyLindsay.com

Anthony Mark Lindsay (born 1954) is an American vocalist and longest-tenured lead singer of Santana. He first joined the band 1991 and performed with Santana from 1995 to 2015, the group's period of greatest commercial success, during which it released the album Supernatural (1999) and won 11 Grammy Awards, including Record of the Year, Album of the Year and Best Rock Album.

== Biography ==
Tony Lindsay grew up in Kingston, New York, and began performing there as an 8-year-old in an a cappella group. Lindsay studied at Albany State University, an hour up the Hudson from his hometown, and spent eight years in Albany, the state's capital. Lindsay moved to San Jose, California, in 1980 and has lived in the San Francisco Bay Area since.

== Career ==
Upon arriving in California, Lindsay took a job at Guitar Center in downtown San Jose and sold suits at a department store. He performed with the Danny Hull Quintet at local bars and restaurants. The band evolved into Spang-a-Lang, a band with which Lindsay continues to perform.

Former Tower of Power keyboard player Chester D. Thompson and drummer Ron E. Beck recruited Lindsay to audition for Carlos Santana at his San Rafael studio. Overnight, Lindsay went from playing small clubs to amphitheaters around the world.

Lindsay's first album with Santana was 1992's Milagro (1992) the first Santana studio album that failed to reach Billboard's top 100. Lindsay sang on the tracks "Life Is for Living" and "Make Somebody Happy".

Lindsay was Santana’s principal vocalist during the release of Supernatural (1999), one of the best selling recordings of all time, with more than 30 million copies sold worldwide, including 15 million copies in the United States. He is credited on five of the album’s tracks: "(Da Le) Yaleo", "Migra", "Primavera", "The Calling" and "Africa Bamba".

Lindsay was let go from the band in 2004 but by 2007 was performing with Santana again. He performed continuously with the band through 2015.

Since leaving Santana, Lindsay has maintained an active schedule of dates at Bay Area clubs, international performances and releases of recorded original material.

== Style and technique ==
“Tony Lindsay is one of the world’s great singers,” Grammy-winning producer Narada Michael Walden has been quoted as saying. “We know and we revere Donny Hathaway, Stevie Wonder and Ray Charles. Tony Lindsay is on par with all three of those.”

== Legacy and influence ==
Lindsay has collaborated and performed with artists such as Tevin Campbell, O'Jays, Al Jarreau, Steve Winwood, Johnny Gill, Teddy Pendergrass, Aretha Franklin and Lou Rawls. He performed a duet with Angela Bofill and the New York Philharmonic Orchestra at New York's Avery Fischer Hall in 1993. His voice can also be heard on Mazda, Hotwheels, Dreyer's Ice Cream and Wendy's commercials as well as on the ‘‘Adventures of Kanga Roddy’’.

== Discography ==
=== With Santana ===
- Milagro (1992)
- Supernatural (1999)
- Shaman (2002)
- Ceremony (2003)
- Food for Thought (2004)
- All That I Am (2005)
- Ultimate Santana (2007)
- "Only If You Knew What My Eyes See" (Radio Edit) (2006)
- Multi-Dimensional Warrior (2008)
- Shape Shifter (2012)
- Corazón (2014)

=== With The Magic of Santana and Alex Ligertwood ===
- Live in Spain 2016 (2017)

=== Solo Recordings ===
- Tony Lindsay (2006)
- Fun in the Sun (2010)
- Memoirs (2013)
- Set Me Free (2016)
- Victory (2016)
- Something Beautiful (2018)
- Soul Soldier (2022)
