= Carlos Santana discography =

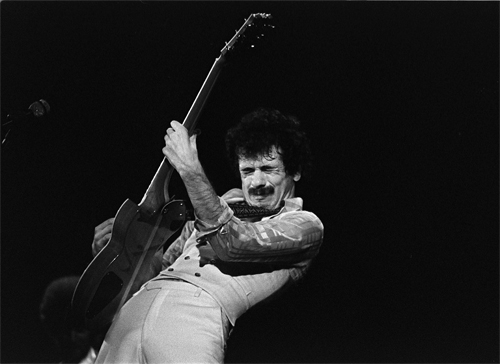
- Carlos Santana during a concert in Cow Palace in Daly City, California near San Francisco
- Studio albums: 7
- Live albums: 3
- Compilation albums: 6
- Singles: 5
- Collaboration albums: 12
- Guest appearances: 50

The discography of Carlos Santana, a Mexican-American rock guitarist, consists of seven studio albums, three live albums, six compilation albums and five singles.

In his early music career he formed the Latin band Santana, named after his surname. As a solo-artist he released several albums. Two of his earliest studio albums, his debut album Love Devotion Surrender with John McLaughlin and the second album, Illuminations, with Alice Coltrane, were collaborations. He then released four studio albums as a solo artist, two of which were released under his spiritual name "Devadip Carlos Santana". His latest released studio album, Santana Brothers, was a collaboration between his nephew Carlos Hernandez and his brother Jorge Santana.

Only two of his prior released albums, his debut album Love Devotion Surrender, and the live album Carlos Santana & Buddy Miles! Live! received a certification from the national American certification. He has also collaborated on twenty-seven albums with numerous artists, such as Chad Kroeger and Steven Tyler, and appeared in forty-nine albums as a guest guitarist.

In February 1976, Santana was presented with fifteen gold disc in Australia, representing sales in excess of 244,000.

Rolling Stone named Santana number fifteen on their list of the 100 Greatest Guitarists of All Time in 2003.

== Albums ==
=== Studio albums ===
List of studio albums, with selected details, peak chart positions and certifications
Title	Album details	Peak chart positions										Certifications (sales thresholds)
Title	Album details	US	AUS	AUT	FRA	NLD	NZL	NOR	SWE	SWI	UK	Certifications (sales thresholds)
Love Devotion Surrender	Released: July 20, 1973; Label: Columbia; Format: LP, CD	14	10	6	—	—	—	19	—	—	7	RIAA: Gold
Illuminations	Released: September 1974; Label: Columbia; Format: LP, CD	79	75	—	—	—	—	—	—	—	40	
Oneness – Silver Dreams Golden Reality	Released: March 1979; Label: Columbia; Format: LP, CD	87	39	—	12	—	43	—	—	—	55	
The Swing of Delight	Released: August 1980; Label: Columbia; Format: LP, CD	65	21	14	22	—	20	23	28	—	65	
Havana Moon	Released: April 1983; Label: CBS; Format: LP, CD	31	32	18	—	16	—	6	6	—	84	
Blues for Salvador	Released: October 1987; Label: Columbia; Format: LP, CD	195	95	—	—	—	—	—	—	—	—	
Santana Brothers	Released: September 27, 1994; Label: Guts and Grace; Format: LP, CD	191	—	—	—	—	—	—	—	48	—	

=== Live albums ===
List of live albums, with selected details, peak chart positions and certifications
Title	Album details	Peak chart positions				Certifications (sales thresholds)
Title	Album details	US	AUS	NLD	UK	Certifications (sales thresholds)
Carlos Santana & Buddy Miles! Live!	Released: June 7, 1972; Label: Columbia; Format: LP, CD	8	13	6	29	RIAA: Platinum
Carlos Santana Live	Released: 2004; Label: United Audio Entertainment – unofficial; Format: CD	—	—	—	—	
Carlos Santana and Wayne Shorter	Released: 2005; Label: Image Entertainment; Format: LP, CD	—	—	—	—	
"—" denotes releases that did not chart or was not released.

=== Compilation albums ===
List of compilation albums, with selected details
Title	Album details
Magic of Carlos Santana	Released: July 6, 2001; Label: Revolver; Format: CD
The Latin Sound of Carlos Santana	Released: February 17, 2003; Label: Bellevue; Format: CD
Carlos Santana	Released: May 31, 2004; Label: Real Gold; Format: CD
Very Best of Carlos Santana	Released: April 4, 2005; Label: Joan; Format: CD
Carlos Santana	Released: April 7, 2006; Label: Joan; Format: CD
Havana Moon/Blues for Salvador	Released: September 17, 2007; Label: Joan; Format: CD
Multi-Dimensional Warrior	Released: October 14, 2008; Label: Sony; Format: CD

=== Collaboration albums ===
List of albums Carlos Santana collaborated on, with selected details
Title	Album details
Mike Bloomfield and Al Kooper	Released: 1969; Label: Columbia; Format: LP
Paths to Greatness	Released: 1992; Label: Rokk Steady; Format: CD
In From the Storm, The Music of Jimi Hendrix	Released: October 24, 1995; Label: RCA; Format: LP, CD
Crossroads 2: Live in the Seventies	Released: April 2, 1996; Label: Polydor Records/UMGD; Format: CD
The Miseducation of Lauryn Hill	Released: August 25, 1998; Label: Ruffhouse, Columbia; Format: CD
Eat at Whitey's	Released: October 17, 2000; Label: Tommy Boy, Warner Bros.; Format: CD
Invincible	Released: October 30, 2001; Label: Epic; Format: CD
Everyday	Released: February 27, 2001; Label: RCA; Format: CD
Bring 'Em In	Released: September 27, 2005; Label: Jive; Format: CD
Oral Fixation Vol. 2	Released: November 28, 2005; Label: Epic; Format: CD
Cool & Collected	Released: September 5, 2006; Label: Columbia/Legacy; Format: CD
Djin Djin	Released: April 27, 2007; Label: Razor & Tie; Format: CD

== Singles ==
List of singles, with selected peak chart positions
Year	Title	Peak chart positions					Album
Year	Title	US	NLD	GER	SWI	UK	Album
1972	"Evil Ways" / "Them Changes"	84	—	—	—	—	Carlos Santana & Buddy Miles! Live!
1983	"Watch Your Step"	107	—	—	—	—	Havana Moon
1983	"They All Went to Mexico" (featuring Willie Nelson and Booker T. Jones)^{[A]}	—	6	—	—	—	Havana Moon
1983	"Havana Moon"^{[A]}	—	—	—	—	—	Havana Moon
2002	"Dirty Dancin'" (The Product G&B featuring Carlos Santana)	—	—	76	53	—	Non-album single
2006	"Illegal" (Shakira featuring Carlos Santana)	—	7	11	10	34	Oral Fixation Vol. 2
2007	"No Llores" (Gloria Estefan featuring Carlos Santana, José Feliciano and Sheila E.)	117	—	—	—	—	90 Millas
2014	"Dar um Jeito (We Will Find a Way)" (Carlos Santana and Wyclef Jean featuring Avicii and Alexandre Pires)	—	—	—	—	—	One Love, One Rhythm
2019	"Mamacita" (Tyga featuring YG and Carlos Santana)	—	—	—	—	—	TBA
"—" denotes releases that did not chart or were not released.

Notes

- A: This track is an instrumental or a non-single, but it did chart.

== Guest appearances ==
List of guest appearances on albums
Year	Album	Footnotes
1969	Mike Bloomfield and Al Kooper	
1971	For Those Who Chant	
1971	Papa John Creach	
1971	Bark	
1974	Stories to Tell	
1976	Eternity	
1976	Garden of Love Light	
1978	Tropico	
1978	Electric Guitarist	
1978	Awakening	
1980	Middle Man	
1980	Monster	
1982	Looking Out	
1982	Let Me Know You	
1982	I'll Never Stop Loving You	
1982	Escenas de Amor	
1984	One Man Mission	
1984	Real Live	
1985	Gregg Rollie	
1985	Who's Zoomin' Who?	
1986	Dance to the Beat of My Drum	
1986	This Is This!	
1987	Uptown	
1987	Gringo	
1988	Old Friends New Friends	
1989	Real Life Story	
1989	The Healer	
1989	Thinking of You	
1991	Mystic Jazz	
1991	Amen	
1991	Touma	
1991	Mr. Lucky	
1992	Solo Para Ti	
1992	Tramaine Hawkins: Live	
1995	Everybody's Gettin' Some	
1995	Chill Out	
1996	Fifa	
1996	Mystic Man	
1997	Cuando Tú No Estás	
2002	Revolución de Amor	
2003	Seguimos	
2003	State of Grace II	
2003	The Preacher's Son	
2004	The Montreux Concerts	
2004	Timeless Journey	
2004	The Clarence Greenwood Recordings	
2004	Live Trax Vol. 2	
2007	Live at the Montreux Jazz Festival	
2009	Time Flies When You're Having Fun	
2010	Living Proof	
2013	Lickety Split	
2014	Formula, Vol. 2	
2015	Vivir es hoy	
2018	Mi Luz Mayor	

=== Other appearances ===
- 1969: Mike Bloomfield/Al Kooper: The Live Adventures of Mike Bloomfield and Al Kooper on "Sonny Boy Williamson"
- 1978: John McLaughlin: Electric Guitarist on "Friendship"
- 1979: Narada Michael Walden: Awakening on "Awakening Suite Part 1" and "The Awakening"
- 1980: Herbie Hancock: Monster on "Saturday Night"
- 1981: Masayoshi Takanaka: On 2 August 1981, Carlos Santana played with Takanaka during the Super Live Summer Session at the Yokohama Stadium
- 1984: Bob Dylan: Real Live on "Tombstone Blues"
- 1984: Jim Capaldi: One Man Mission on "Lost Inside Your Love" and "Nobody Loves You"
- 1985: Gregg Rolie: Gregg Rolie on "Marianne"
- 1986: Weather Report: This Is This! on "This Is This" and "Man with the Copper Fingers"
- 1987: Gregg Rolie: Gringo on "Too Late, Too Late" and "Fire at Night"
- 1989: John Lee Hooker: Chill Out on "Chill Out (Things Gonna Change)"
- 1991: John Lee Hooker: Mr Lucky – Santana co-produced with Ry Cooder, Roy Rogers and Mike Kappus. Santana also played on the album
- 1996: Eric Clapton: Crossroads 2: Live in the Seventies on five songs
- 1998: Lauryn Hill: The Miseducation of Lauryn Hill on "To Zion"
- 2000: Everlast: Eat at Whitey's on "Babylon Feeling"
- 2001: Michael Jackson: Invincible on "Whatever Happens"
- 2001: Dave Matthews Band: Everyday on "Mother Father"
- 2004: Eric Clapton: Crossroads Guitar Festival on "Jingo"
- 2004: Cheb Khaled: "Love to the People" single
- 2004: Dora the Explorer: "Oye Como Va" single
- 2005: Buddy Guy: Bring 'Em In on "I Put a Spell on You"
- 2005: Herbie Hancock: Possibilities on "Safiatou"
- 2005: Shakira: Oral Fixation, Vol. 2 on "Illegal"
- 2005: Miles Davis: Cool & Collected on "It's About That Time" (Remix)
- 2007: Angélique Kidjo: Djin Djin on "Pearls"
- 2018: Eddie Palmieri: Mi Luz Mayor on "Mi Congo"
- 2022: FKJ: "Greener" single

== See also ==
- Santana (band) discography
- Santana videography
