= Love Songs (Santana album) =

Compilation album by Santana
- Released: February 3, 2004
- Genre: Rock
- Label: Sony International

Professional ratings
Review scores
Source	Rating
AllMusic	3/5 stars

Love Songs is a 2004 compilation album by Santana.

== Track listing ==
1. "Samba Pa Ti"
2. "Europa (Earth's Cry Heaven's Smile)"
3. "Give Me Love"
4. "I'll Be Waiting" (Single version)
5. "Flor D'luna (Moonflower)"
6. "Stormy"
7. "Life Is a Lady/Holiday"
8. "Aqua Marine" (Single version)
9. "Sensitive Kind"
10. "I Love You Much Too Much"
11. "One with You"
12. "Daughter of the Night"
13. "Written in Sand"
14. "Before We Go"
15. "Love Is You"
