= The Best of Santana Vol. 2 =

Greatest hits album by Santana
- Released: November 21, 2000
- Genre: Blues rock; hard rock
- Label: Sony
- Producer: Various

Santana chronology
Supernatural (1999)	The Best of Santana Vol. 2 (2000)	The Essential Santana (2002)

Alternative cover
- Back cover

The Best of Santana Vol. 2 is a 2000 compilation album by Santana and a companion album to 1998's The Best of Santana.

== Track listing ==
1. "Persuasion"
2. "You Just Don't Care"
3. "Black Magic Woman/Gypsy Queen" (Live)
4. "Incident at Neshabur"
5. "Se a Cabo"
6. "Hope You're Feeling Better"
7. "Toussaint L'Overture"
8. "Guajira"
9. "Everything's Coming Our Way"
10. "Europa (Earth's Cry Heaven's Smile)" (Live)
11. "Stormy"
12. "Well All Right"
13. "One Chain (Don't Make No Prison)"
14. "Peace on Earth...Mother Earth...Third Stone from the Sun"
