= Borboletta =

Studio album by Santana
- Released: October 1974
- Genre: Jazz fusion
- Length: 50:05
- Label: CBS
- Producers: Carlos Santana, Michael Shrieve, Tom Coster

Santana chronology
Greatest Hits (1974)	Borboletta (1974)	Amigos (1976)

Professional ratings
Review scores
Source	Rating
AllMusic	3.5/5 stars
Christgau's Record Guide	C+
Džuboks	(mixed)
Rolling Stone	(not rated)
The Rolling Stone Album Guide	3.5/5 stars

Borboletta is the sixth studio album by the American Latin rock band Santana. It is one of their jazz-funk-fusion-oriented albums, along with Caravanserai (1972), and Welcome (1973). Non-band albums by Carlos Santana in this style also include Love Devotion Surrender (1973) with John McLaughlin and Illuminations (1974) with Alice Coltrane, Jack DeJohnette and Jules Broussard. The guitarist leaves much room to percussion, saxophone and keyboards to set moods ("Spring Manifestations"), as well as lengthy solos by himself ("Promise of a Fisherman") and vocals ("Give and Take", a funky guitar-led song). The record was released in a metallic blue sleeve displaying a butterfly, an allusion to the album Butterfly Dreams (1973) by Brazilian musician Flora Purim and her husband Airto Moreira, whose contributions deeply influenced the sound of Borboletta. In Portuguese, borboleta means "butterfly".

Original bassist David Brown returned to replace Doug Rauch along with bassist Stanley Clarke on some tracks. Vocalist/keyboardist Leon Patillo also joined. After the album's completion, drummer Michael Shrieve left, to be replaced by Leon "Ndugu" Chancler, who had guested on parts of the album.

Also on a SME SACD from Japan,

== Track listing ==
Side one
No.	Title	Lyrics	Music	Length
1.	"Spring Manifestations (Sound Effects)"	instrumental — percussion & sound effects	Airto Moreira, Flora Purim	1:05
2.	"Canto de los Flores"	instrumental	Tom Coster	3:45
3.	"Life Is Anew"	Carlos Santana	Carlos Santana, Michael Shrieve	4:30
4.	"Give and Take"	Santana	Santana, Coster, Shrieve	5:46
5.	"One with the Sun"	Earlyrin Martini	Jerry Martini	4:20
6.	"Aspirations"	instrumental	Coster, Santana	5:12

Side two
No.	Title	Lyrics	Music	Length
7.	"Practice What You Preach"	Santana	Santana	4:28
8.	"Mirage"	Leon Patillo	Leon Patillo	4:43
9.	"Here and Now"	instrumental	Armando Peraza, Santana	3:01
10.	"Flor de Canela"	instrumental	Santana, Doug Rauch	2:20
11.	"Promise of a Fisherman"	instrumental	Dorival Caymmi	8:05
12.	"Borboletta"	instrumental	Moreira	2:50

== Personnel ==
- Leon Patillo – vocals (3–5, 7, 8), piano (8), electric piano (3, 5), organ (4)
- Flora Purim – vocals (1, 11)
- Jules Broussard – soprano and tenor saxophones (4, 6, 9, 11)
- Carlos Santana – guitar (3–5, 7–11) percussion (2, 9), congas (7), gong (8), vocals (11), producer
- Tom Coster – piano (4, 9), Hammond organ (7, 10, 11), electric piano, Fender Rhodes (2, 9–11), organ (3, 5, 6, 8), Moog synthesizer (4, 8), producer
- Stanley Clarke – bass guitar (6, 9–11)
- David Brown – bass guitar (2, 4, 5, 7, 8)
- Michael Shrieve – drums (2–5, 7, 8), producer
- Leon "Ndugu" Chancler – drums (6, 9)
- Airto Moreira – drums (10, 11), percussion (12), sound effects (1), triangle (11), vocals (12)
- Armando Peraza – percussion, congas (2, 4–6, 8, 11), bongos (3, 6, 11), soprano saxophone (10)
- José Areas – timbales (4), congas (2, 3)
- Michael Carpenter – echoplex (2)

Airto Moreira and Flora Purim appear courtesy of CTI Records

== Charts ==
Chart (1974–1975)	Peak position
Australian Albums (Kent Music Report)	38
Austrian Albums (Ö3 Austria)	9
Canada Top Albums/CDs (RPM)	14
German Albums (Offizielle Top 100)	28
Italian Albums (Musica e Dischi)	4
Japanese Albums (Oricon)	11
New Zealand Albums (RMNZ)	13
UK Albums (Official Charts)	18
US Billboard Top LPs & Tape	20
US Soul LPs (Billboard)	18

== Certifications ==
Region	Certification	Certified units/sales
United Kingdom (BPI)	Silver	60,000^{^}
United States (RIAA)	Gold	500,000^{^}
^{^} Shipments figures based on certification alone.
