= Best Instrumentals Vol. 2 =

Greatest hits album by Santana
- Released: September 28, 1999
- Genre: Blues rock, hard rock, latin rock
- Label: Sony International
- Producer: Various

Best Instrumentals Vol. 2 is a 1999 compilation by Santana.

== Track listing ==
1. "Touchdown Raiders"
2. "Verão Vermelho"
3. "Revelations"
4. "Runnin'"
5. "Primera Invasion"
6. "Hannibal"
7. "Samba de Sausalito"
8. "Free Angela"
9. "Oye Como Va"
10. "Singin Winds, Crying Beasts"
11. "Jingo"
12. "Toussaint L'Overture"
13. "Batuka"
14. "Jungle Strut"
