= Moonflower (album) =

Studio album / live album by Santana
- Released: October 1977
- Recorded: December 1976 (live tracks / Europe); 1977 (studio tracks / San Francisco)
- Genres: Jazz fusion; latin rock
- Length: 86:50
- Label: Columbia
- Producers: Carlos Santana; Tom Coster

Santana chronology
Festival (1977)	Moonflower (1977)	Inner Secrets (1978)

Singles from Moonflower
- 1. "She's Not There" Released: October 1977

Professional ratings
Review scores
Source	Rating
AllMusic	3/5 stars
Christgau's Record Guide	B+
Rolling Stone	(not rated)
The Rolling Stone Album Guide	3/5 stars

Moonflower is a double album released in 1977 by Santana. The recording features both studio and live tracks, which are interspersed with one another throughout the album. It is perhaps the group's most popular live album, because the 1974 album Lotus did not receive a U.S. domestic release until 1991. It displays a mix between the fusion of Latin and blues rock styles of the late 1960s and early 1970s, and the much more experimental and spiritual jazz fusion sound that characterized the band's mid-1970s work. The live material was recorded during the supporting tour for the Amigos album. This is the first of 5 albums with drummer Graham Lear.

A cover version of the Zombies' mid-1960s hit song "She's Not There" was released as a single and peaked at #27. The song was the first Santana recording to hit the Top 40 of the Billboard charts since "No One to Depend On" reached #36 in 1972. The album reached #10 on the Billboard Top LPs & Tape charts and was eventually certified platinum, neither of which occurred again until the star-studded Supernatural in 1999.

== Track listing ==
All tracks written and composed by Tom Coster and Carlos Santana, except where noted

=== Side one ===
1. "Dawn/Go Within" – 2:44 (Studio)
2. "Carnaval" – 2:17 (Live)
3. "Let the Children Play" (Leon Patillo, Santana) – 2:37 (Live)
4. "Jugando" (José "Chepito" Areas, Santana) – 2:09 (Live)
5. "I'll Be Waiting" (Santana) – 5:20 (Studio; also issued on single)
6. "Zulu" – 3:25 (Studio)

=== Side two ===
1. "Bahia" – 1:37 (Studio)
2. "Black Magic Woman/Gypsy Queen" (Peter Green/Gábor Szabó) – 6:32 (Live)
3. "Dance Sister Dance (Baila Mi Hermana)" (Leon "Ndugu" Chancler, Coster, David Rubinson) – 7:45 (Live)
4. "Europa (Earth's Cry Heaven's Smile)" – 6:07 (Live)

=== Side three ===
1. "She's Not There" (Rod Argent) – 4:09 (Studio; also issued on single)
2. "Flor d'Luna (Moonflower)" (Coster) – 5:01 (Studio)
3. "Soul Sacrifice/Head, Hands & Feet" (Santana, Gregg Rolie, David Brown, Marcus Malone/Graham Lear) – 14:01 (Live)

=== Side four ===
1. "El Morocco" – 5:05 (Studio)
2. "Transcendance" (Santana) – 5:13 (Studio)
3. "Savor/Toussaint L'Overture" (Santana, Rolie, Brown, Michael Carabello, Michael Shrieve, Areas) – 12:56 (Live)

=== Bonus tracks on 2003 reissue ===
1. "Black Magic Woman" (Single edit) (Green) – 2:37 (Live)
2. "I'll Be Waiting" (Single edit) (Santana) – 3:12 (Studio)
3. "She's Not There" (Single edit) (Argent) – 3:19 (Studio)

== Personnel ==
- Greg Walker – vocals
- Carlos Santana – guitar, vocals, percussion
- Tom Coster – keyboards
- Pablo Tellez – bass, vocals (live tracks)
- David Margen – bass (studio tracks)
- Graham Lear – drums
- Raul Rekow – percussion
- José "Chepito" Areas – percussion (live tracks)
- Pete Escovedo – percussion (studio tracks)
- Tommy Coster – keyboards on "Zulu"

== Charts ==
Chart (1977–1978)	Peak position
Australian Albums (Kent Music Report)	7
Austrian Albums (Ö3 Austria)	10
Canada Top Albums/CDs (RPM)	8
Dutch Albums (Album Top 100)	2
Finnish Albums (The Official Finnish Charts)	19
French Albums (SNEP)	6
German Albums (Offizielle Top 100)	16
Italian Albums (Musica e Dischi)	3
Japanese Albums (Oricon)	14
New Zealand Albums (RMNZ)	12
Norwegian Albums (VG-lista)	16
Swedish Albums (Sverigetopplistan)	22
UK Albums (Official Charts)	7
US Billboard Top LPs & Tape	10

== Certifications ==
Region	Certification	Certified units/sales
Canada (Music Canada)	Gold	50,000^{^}
France (SNEP)	Platinum	300,000^{*}
Netherlands (NVPI)	Platinum	100,000^{^}
Germany (BVMI)	Gold	250,000^{^}
United Kingdom (BPI)	Gold	100,000^{^}
United States (RIAA)	2× Platinum	2,000,000^{^}
^{*} Sales figures based on certification alone.^{^} Shipments figures based on certification alone.
