= Armando Peraza =

Cuban jazz percussionist (1924–2014)

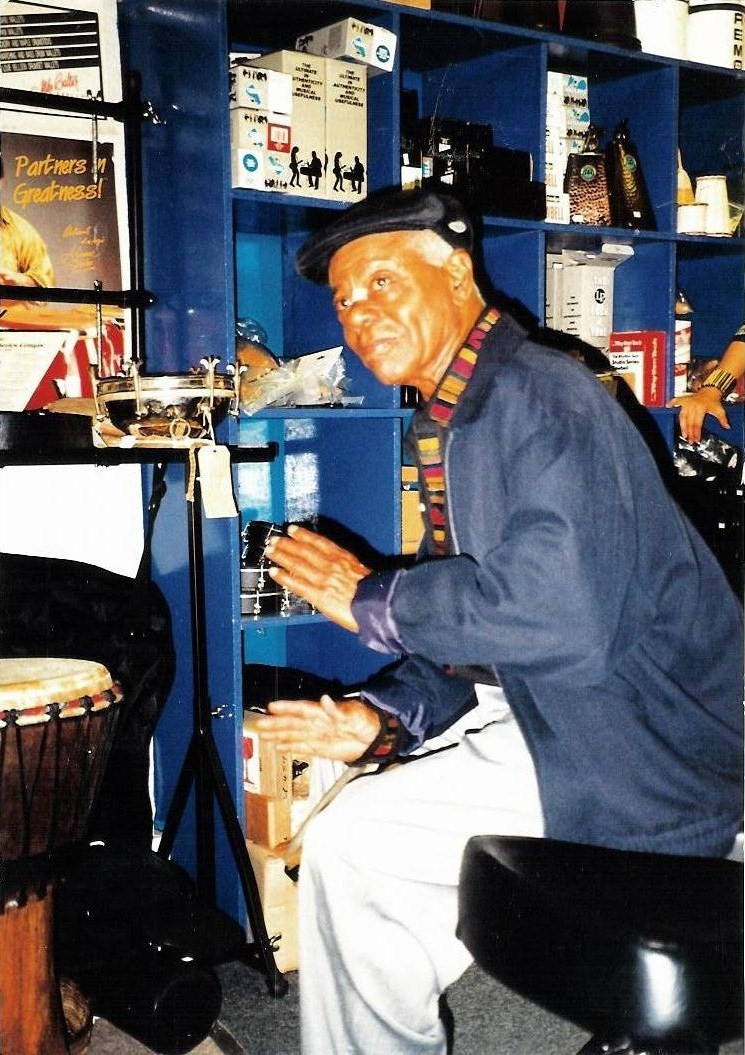
- Armando Peraza playing a bongo in London, 1999

Background information
- Born: May 30, 1924; Lawton Batista, Havana, Cuba
- Died: April 14, 2014 (aged 89) San Francisco, California
- Genres: Jazz; Latin jazz; rock; pop
- Occupation: Musician
- Instruments: Percussion; congas; bongos
- Formerly of: Santana

Armando Peraza (May 30, 1924 – April 14, 2014) was a Cuban Latin jazz percussionist and a member of the rock band Santana. Peraza played congas, bongos, and timbales.

== Biography ==
=== Early life ===
Born in Lawton Batista, Havana, Cuba in 1924 (although the birth year is uncertain), he was orphaned by age 7 and lived on the streets. When he was twelve, he supported himself by selling vegetables, coaching boxing, playing semi-pro baseball, and becoming a loan shark. His music career began at seventeen, when he heard at a baseball game that bandleader Alberto Ruiz was looking for a conga player. Ruiz's brother was on the same baseball team as Peraza. Despite the absence of experience in music, he practiced and won the audition.

=== Moving to New York ===
He left Cuba for Mexico in 1948 to tend to his sick friend, conga drummer Mongo Santamaría. They arrived in New York City in 1949. After playing in Machito's big band, Peraza was invited by Charlie Parker to participate in a recording session that included Buddy Rich. He recorded with Slim Gaillard in New York in November 1949 in a session that produced "Bongo City". He toured the U.S. with Gaillard's band until they reached San Francisco, where Gaillard owned the nightclub Bop City. After a period in Mexico, where he recorded with Perez Prado and did some soundtracks for the Mexican movie industry, he returned to the U.S. and settled in San Francisco. While on the West Coast, he worked with Dizzy Gillespie, toured extensively with Charles Mingus and Dexter Gordon, and played in California for Mexican farm workers with Puerto Rican actor and musician Tony Martinez (who played "Pepino" on the TV show The Real McCoys). Armando also led an Afro-Cuban dance review at the Cable Car Village club in San Francisco, attracting a clientele from Hollywood that included Errol Flynn, Marlon Brando, and Rita Hayworth.

=== Working with Shearing and Tjader ===
In 1954, while in San Francisco with pianist Dave Brubeck, Peraza met Cal Tjader, Brubeck's drummer at the time. Jazz critic Leonard Feather recommended Peraza to Fantasy Records to record an Afro-Cuban album with Tjader. The result was Ritmo Caliente, which combined Afro-Cuban rhythms with a jazz sensibility. He was introduced to British pianist George Shearing by bassist Al McKibbon. He spent the next twelve years with Shearing, a collaboration that put Peraza at the front of Afro-Cuban music. He emerged as a composer, writing and recording twenty-one songs for Shearing, such as "Mambo in Chimes", "Mambo in Miami", "Ritmo Africano", "Armando's Hideaway", "This is Africa", and "Estampa Cubana". These recordings were during the mambo craze in the U.S. and the world. Peraza's technique and power as a hand drummer became a feature of Shearing's performances.

He toured all over the world with Shearing, but it was in America that he experienced persistent and institutionalized racism. In Miami during dates with Shearing and Peggy Lee in 1959, Peraza and black members of the band were prohibited from staying at the same hotel as the white musicians. Shearing and Lee resolved the situation by threatening to quit the performance unless Peraza and the others were allowed to stay at their hotel. Shearing's was one of the first racially integrated jazz groups. While with Shearing, Peraza had opportunity to play with the classical symphonies of Boston, Philadelphia, New York, and Oklahoma City.

In 1959, Peraza joined Mongo Santamaría for the Mongo album with conga drummer Francisco Aguabella, another contemporary and friend of Peraza. "Afro-Blue" became a jazz standard after John Coltrane recorded it. The album is combined with Yambo in the double compilation Afro Roots in 1972.

In the 1960s, Peraza was a member of Cal Tjader's band for six years. He was encouraged to perform and record in southern California by jazz drummer Shelly Manne. Peraza performed throughout the area at such venues as Shelly's Manne-Hole (owned by Manne) and The Lighthouse in Hermosa Beach. A highlight was performing with the Stan Kenton Orchestra at the Hollywood Bowl. Through his friendship with Manne, he was introduced to Judy Garland, who hired Peraza to play in her orchestra for The Judy Garland Show, a television series that ran from 1963 to 1964. In the fall of 1964, he recorded the album Soul Sauce with Tjader. The single "Guachi Guaro" won a Grammy Award in 1965.

Although Peraza preferred being a featured performer to leading, he did record one solo album, Wild Thing (1968), for Skye, a label owned by Tjader, Gary McFarland, and Gábor Szabó. The album featured performances by pianist Chick Corea, saxophonist Sadao Watanabe, and flautist Johnny Pacheco. When rock music became popular in the 1960s, Peraza was the first Afro-Cuban percussionist to add conga drums to a rock track, notably on Harvey Mandel's Cristo Redentor album in 1968.

=== Joining Santana ===
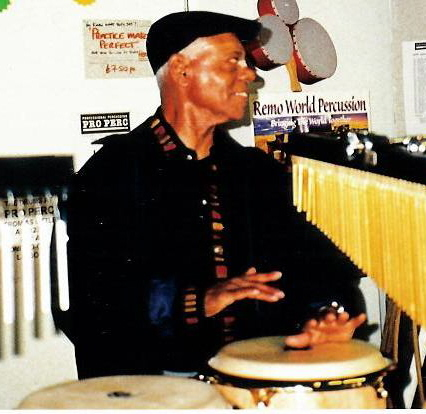
Armando Peraza in London, 1999

In January 1972, at the age of 47, Peraza joined the rock band Santana and influenced the band in melding Afro-Cuban, jazz, rock, and blues. Peraza remained with Carlos Santana for nearly twenty years and played to millions of people around the world, partnering with percussionists José Areas, Mingo Lewis, Raul Rekow, and Orestes Vilató. He wrote or co-wrote sixteen songs recorded by Santana, such as "Gitano" from the album Amigos (1976) for which Peraza sang the lyrics.

Peraza retired from Santana in 1990 at the age of 66, although he traveled to Santiago de Chile for a 1992 concert with Santana in front of a crowd of over 100,000 people. In 2005, he appeared on a recording by John Santos, 20th Anniversary, which included "El Changüí de Peraza" with Peraza on bongos. In 2002, he returned to his native Cuba, his first trip there in over fifty years.

In July 2006, Peraza, at 82 years of age, made a rare appearance with Santana for a three show performance at the Montreux Jazz Festival in Switzerland. This was the first of a number of summer live appearances. Later he appeared at the San José Jazz Festival in California with the Julius Melendez Latin Jazz Ensemble. He taught drum clinics in California with Raul Rekow and Karl Perazzo, both members of Santana. He recorded with pianist Rebeca Mauleon on Descarga en California (Universal/Pimienta) and co-wrote a song on Cepeda Forever in honor of his friend, baseball player Orlando Cepeda.

In 2007, he received a Lifetime Achievement Award from the Voices of Latin Rock. The tribute show was held at Bimbo's nightclub in San Francisco and was attended by Carlos Santana, who presented Peraza with an award. Also attending and performing were members of the band Malo and a reunion of the original Santana band with José Areas, Mike Carabello, Gregg Rolie, and Michael Shrieve. Every January, the Voices of Latin Rock present the Armando Peraza Award for achievement in the San Francisco Bay Area.

Peraza died of pneumonia on April 14, 2014, at the age of 89.

== Discography ==
=== As leader ===
- Wild Thing (Skye, 1968)

=== As sideman ===
With Mongo Santamaria

- Mongo (Fantasy, 1959)
- Afro Roots (Prestige, 1972/1989)

With Carlos Santana

- Oneness – Silver Dreams Golden Reality (Columbia, 1979)
- The Swing of Delight (Columbia, 1980)
- Havana Moon (Columbia, 1983)
- Blues for Salvador (Columbia, 1987)

With Santana

- Caravanserai (Columbia, 1972)
- Love Devotion Surrender (Columbia, 1972)
- Welcome (Columbia, 1973)
- Borboletta (Columbia, 1974)
- Illuminations (Columbia, 1974)
- Amigos (Columbia, 1976)
- Inner Secrets (Columbia, 1978)
- Marathon (Columbia, 1979)
- Zebop (Columbia, 1981)
- Shangó (Columbia, 1982)
- Beyond Appearances (Columbia, 1985)
- Freedom (Columbia, 1987)
- Viva Santana! (Columbia, 1988)
- Spirits Dancing in the Flesh (Columbia, 1990)

With George Shearing

- Shearing in Hi-Fi (MGM, 1955)
- George Shearing Caravan (MGM, 1955)
- An Evening with George Shearing (MGM, 1955)
- The Shearing Spell (Capitol, 1955)
- Velvet Carpet (Capitol, 1956)
- Latin Escapade (Capitol, 1956)
- Black Satin (Capitol, 1957)
- In the Night, George Shearing and Dakota Staton (Capitol, 1958)
- Burnished Brass (Capitol, 1958)
- Blue Chiffon (Capitol, 1958)
- Latin Lace (Capitol, 1958)
- George Shearing On Stage (Capitol, 1959)
- Latin Affair (Capitol, 1959)
- Beauty and the Beat! George Shearing and Peggy Lee (Capitol, 1959)
- On the Sunny Side of the Strip (Capitol, 1959)
- Satin Affair (Capitol, 1959)
- White Satin (Capitol, 1960)
- The Swingin's Mutual! George Shearing and Nancy Wilson (Capitol, 1961)
- Mood Latino (Capitol, 1962)
- San Francisco Scene (Capitol, 1962)
- Love Walked In George Shearing and The Montgomery Brothers (Jazzland, 1962)
- Rare Form! (Capitol, 1965)
- Latin Rendezvous (Capitol, 1965)

With Cal Tjader

- Ritmo Caliente! (Fantasy, 1955)
- Mas Ritmo Caliente (Fantasy, 1957)
- In a Latin Bag (Verve, 1961)
- Soul Sauce (Verve, 1965)
- Soul Bird: Whiffenpoof (Verve, 1965)
- Along Comes Cal (Verve, 1967)
- Latin + Jazz = Cal Tjader (DCC Jazz, 1968 [1990])
- Cal Tjader Plugs In (Skye, 1969)

With others

- Patti Austin, Patti Austin (Qwest/WB Records, 1984)
- Gato Barbieri, Tropico (A&M, 1978)
- Doug Clifford, Cosmo (Fantasy, 1972)
- Nat King Cole, Nat King Cole Sings/George Shearing Plays (Capitol, 1962)
- Victor Feldman, Latinsville! (Contemporary, 1960)
- Albert Hammond, Albert Hammond (Mums Records, 1974)
- John Lee Hooker, The Healer (Chameleon, 1989)
- Rick James, Street Songs (Gordy, 1981)
- Harvey Mandel, Cristo Redentor (Phillips, 1968)
- Brenda Patterson, Brenda Patterson (Playboy Records, 1973)
- Linda Ronstadt, Frenesí (Elektra, 1992)
- Sister Sledge, All American Girls (Cotillion, 1981)
- Sly & the Family Stone, Heard Ya Missed Me, Well I'm Back (Epic, 1976)
- Randy Weston, Uhuru Afrika (Roulette, 1960)
- Sterling Crew & Bobby Vega, Sonic CD (American Soundtrack) (Sega, 1993)
