= Shangó (Santana album) =

Studio album by Santana
- Released: August 1982
- Studios: The Automatt, San Francisco, California
- Genres: Chicano rock; reggae rock
- Length: 44:29
- Label: Columbia
- Producers: Bill Szymczyk, John Ryan, Carlos Santana, Gregg Rolie

Santana chronology
Zebop! (1981)	Shangó (1982)	Beyond Appearances (1985)

Singles from Shangó
- 1. "Hold On" Released: August 20, 1982; 2. "Nowhere To Run" Released: 1982; 3. "What Does It Take (To Win Your Love)" Released: 1982; 4. "Night Hunting Time" Released: 1982

Professional ratings
Review scores
Source	Rating
AllMusic	2/5 stars
Rolling Stone	2/5 stars

Shangó is the thirteenth studio album by Santana. The album reached #22 on the Billboard 200 album charts. The single "Hold On" from the album reached number 15 in the U.S. Billboard Hot 100 singles chart and number 17 on Billboard's Top Tracks chart. A second single from the album, "Nowhere to Run", peaked at number 66 on the Hot 100 chart and number thirteen on the Mainstream Rock chart and a third single reached number 34 in the Mainstream Rock chart.

== Track listing ==
=== Side one ===
1. "The Nile" (Alex Ligertwood, Carlos Santana, Gregg Rolie) - 4:55
2. "Hold On" (Ian Thomas) - 4:21
3. "Night Hunting Time" (Paul Brady) - 4:42
4. "Nowhere to Run" (Russ Ballard) - 4:04
5. "Nueva York" (Armando Peraza, Ligertwood, Santana, David Margen, Graham Lear, Rolie, Orestes Vilato, Richard Baker, Raul Rekow) - 4:59

=== Side two ===
1. "Oxun (Oshūn)" (Santana, Ligertwood, Rolie, Lear, Peraza, Rekow, Vilató) - 4:14
2. "Body Surfing" (Santana, Ligertwood) - 4:24
3. "What Does It Take (To Win Your Love)" (Johnny Bristol, Vernon Bullock, Harvey Fuqua) - 3:24
4. "Let Me Inside" (Santana, Chris Solberg) - 3:32
5. "Warrior" (Margen, Baker, Ligertwood, Santana) - 4:21
6. "Shangó" (Rekow, Vilató, Peraza) - 1:44

== Personnel ==
Santana

- Alex Ligertwood – vocals, rhythm guitar
- Carlos Santana – guitar, vocals, producer
- Richard Baker – keyboards
- Gregg Rolie – organ (5), vocals, producer
- David Margen – bass
- Graham Lear – drums
- Armando Peraza – congas, bongos, vocals
- Raul Rekow – congas, vocals
- Orestes Vilató – timbales, vocals

Technical

- Bill Szymczyk – arranger, engineer, mixing, producer
- John Ryan – arranger, producer
- Jim Gaines – engineer
- Will Herold – engineer
- Ben King – second mixing engineer
- Maureen Droney – assistant engineer
- Ray Etzler – director
- Ted Jensen – mastering
- Richard Stutting – art direction, design
- Guido Harari – photography
- Cristobal Gonzáles – yarn painting

== Charts ==
Chart (1982)	Peak position
Australian Albums (Kent Music Report)	33
Austrian Albums (Ö3 Austria)	9
Canada Top Albums/CDs (RPM)	20
Dutch Albums (Album Top 100)	26
Finnish Albums (The Official Finnish Charts)	22
German Albums (Offizielle Top 100)	14
Japanese Albums (Oricon)	29
New Zealand Albums (RMNZ)	13
Norwegian Albums (VG-lista)	3
Swedish Albums (Sverigetopplistan)	12
UK Albums (Official Charts)	35
US Billboard 200	22

== Certifications ==
Region	Certification	Certified units/sales
United States (RIAA)	Gold	500,000^{^}
^{^} Shipments figures based on certification alone.
