= You Know That I Love You (Santana song) =

Single by Santana

from the album Marathon
- B-side: "Aqua Marine"
- Released: 1979
- Recorded: 1979
- Genre: Rock
- Length: 4:26 (album version); 3:28 (single version)
- Label: Columbia
- Songwriters: Chris Solberg; Alex Ligertwood; Alan Pasqua; Carlos Santana
- Producers: Keith Olsen; Santana; David DeVore

Santana singles chronology
"Open Invitation" (1979)	"You Know That I Love You" (1979)	"Aqua Marine" (1979)

"You Know That I Love You" is a song by Latin rock group Santana. It was released as a single in 1979 from their album Marathon.

The song scratched the Top 40 on the Billboard Hot 100, peaking at #35.

== Charts ==
Chart (1980)	Peak position
Australian Singles (Kent Music Report)	89
US Billboard Hot 100	35
