= Leon Patillo =

American Contemporary Christian musician and evangelist

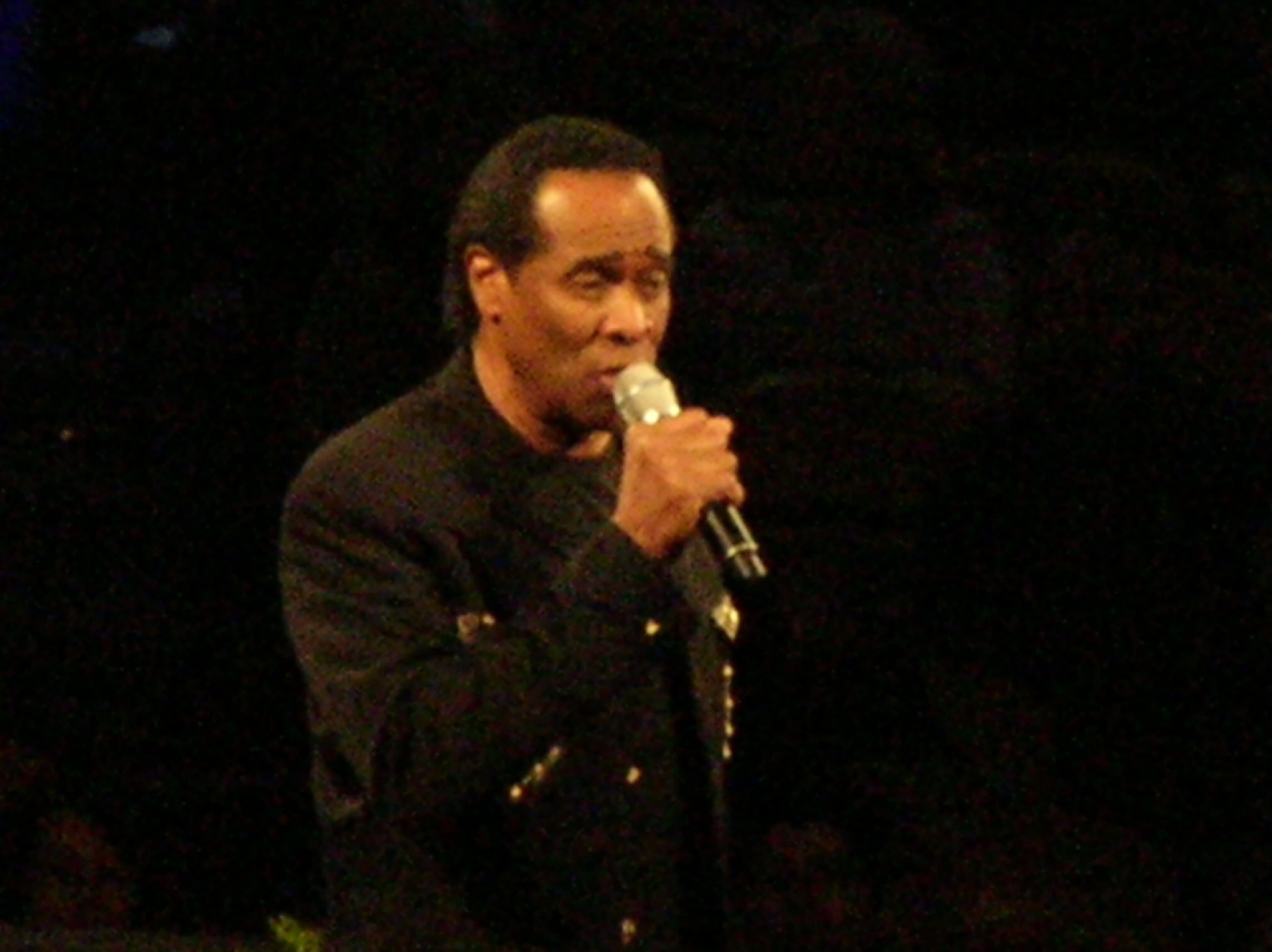
- Patillo in March 2009

Background information
- Born: Leon Norman Patillo; January 1, 1947 (age 79); San Francisco, California, United States
- Genres: Contemporary Christian, rock, funk
- Occupations: Singer, songwriter
- Instruments: Vocals, keyboards
- Years active: 1969–present
- Label: Word Records, Sparrow Records, Maranatha! Music
- Website: leonpatillo.org

Leon Norman Patillo (born January 1, 1947) is an American contemporary Christian singer, keyboardist, and evangelist.

== Career ==
Patillo's first musical endeavor was with the group Creation, later called Leon's Creation. Formed in the late 1960s, Creation was a funk group similar in style and composition to Sly & the Family Stone; they were signed to Atlantic Records. Aside from Creation, Patillo worked at times with Funkadelic and Martha & the Vandellas. In 1974, Patillo joined Santana, in time to record the album Borboletta. He left in 1975, but returned in late 1976 and recorded the Festival album. Afterwards, he launched a solo career on Maranatha Music! then transitioned to Myrrh/ Word Records. He released a string of successful albums on the CCM market in the 1980s, and had his own television show on TBN called Leon and Friends.

Patillo founded his own record label, Positive Pop, in the 1990s, and his most recent releases have been on this imprint. For years, Patillo pastored the Rock House Church on the historic Queen Mary in Long Beach, California. He retired from the ministry in late 2009 in favor of traveling and leading seminars across the country.

== Discography ==
- This Is the Beginning by Leon's Creation, Studio 10 Records (1969)
- Creation by Creation (Funk R&B group) ATCO Records (1974)
- Dance Children Dance (1979)
- Don't Give In (1981)
- I'll Never Stop Lovin' You (1982)
- Live Experience (1983) U.S. Top Contemporary Christian albums No. 10
- The Sky's the Limit (1984) U.S. Christian No. 5
- Love Around the World (1985) U.S. Christian No. 7
- A Funny Thing Happened (1986)
- Brand New (1987) U.S. Christian No. 8
- On the Way Up (1989)
- Christmas with Leon (1992)
- Hands of Praise (1992)
- Church Is on the Move (1993)
- Souly for Him (1994)
- The Classics (1996)
- I Can (1999)
- Breathe on Me (2005)
- Live Experience 2 (2005)
