= Spirits Dancing in the Flesh =

Studio album by Santana
- Released: June 1990
- Studios: The Plant Studios, Sausalito, California
- Genre: Hard rock
- Length: 48:22
- Label: Columbia
- Producers: Carlos Santana, Vernon Reid, Chester Thompson, Jim Gaines

Santana chronology
Viva Santana! (1988)	Spirits Dancing in the Flesh (1990)	Milagro (1992)

Professional ratings
Review scores
Source	Rating
AllMusic	3/5 stars
Entertainment Weekly	B
Rolling Stone	4/5 stars
Select	3/5

Spirits Dancing in the Flesh is the sixteenth studio album by Santana. It reached number eighty-five on the Billboard 200.

== Track listing ==
1. "Let There Be Light/Spirits Dancing in the Flesh" (Carlos Santana, Chester D. Thompson) – 7:20
2. "Gypsy Woman" (Curtis Mayfield) – 4:29
3. "It's a Jungle Out There" (Santana) – 4:32
4. "Soweto (Africa Libre)" (Santana, Thompson, Alphonso Johnson) – 5:06
5. "Choose" (Santana, Thompson, Alex Ligertwood) – 4:14
6. "Peace on Earth...Mother Earth...Third Stone from the Sun" (John Coltrane, Santana, Jimi Hendrix) – 4:26
7. "Full Moon" (Paolo Rustichelli) – 4:31
8. "Who's That Lady" (Rudolph Isley, Ronald Isley, O'Kelly Isley, Jr., Ernie Isley, Marvin Isley, Chris Jasper) – 4:15
9. "Jin-go-lo-ba" (Babatunde Olatunji) – 4:46
10. "Goodness and Mercy" (Santana, Thompson) – 4:30

== Personnel ==
Band

- Carlos Santana – guitar, vocals, percussion
- Alex Ligertwood – vocals, rhythm guitar
- Benny Rietveld – bass guitar
- Chester D. Thompson – keyboards, Hammond B3, horns, vocals
- Armando Peraza – bongos, congas, percussion
- Walfredo Reyes – drums, timbales, percussion

Guest musicians

- Vernon Reid – guitar
- Alphonso Johnson – bass
- Keith Jones – bass
- Paolo Rustichelli – keyboards, acoustic piano
- Wayne Shorter – soprano sax, tenor sax
- Bobby Womack – lead vocals
- Tramaine Hawkins – lead vocals
- Oren Waters – background vocals
- Kevin Dorsey – background vocals
- Jim Gilstrap – background vocals
- Rashan Hylton – background vocals
- Phillip Ingram – background vocals
- Hugh "Sweetfoot" Maynard – background vocals
- Stephen King – vocals
- Orestes Vilató – timbales, vocals
- Raul Rekow – congas, vocals
- Francisco Aguabella – congas

Additional musicians

- Devon Bernardoni – keyboards
- Charisse Dancy – choir
- Sandra Hunter – choir
- Marjo Keller – choir
- Lynice Pinkard – choir
- Lovetta Brown – choir
- De Anna Brown – choir
- Kevin Swan Butler – choir
- Darryl Williams – choir
- Edwin M. Harper, Jr. – choir direction

Production

- Sergio Albonico – executive producer
- Chris Becker – engineering assistance
- Devon Bernardoni – engineering, mixing
- Paul Ericksen – engineering, mixing
- Arne Frager – mixing
- Lori Fumar – engineering assistance
- Jim Gaines – engineering, mixing, production
- Bernie Kirsh – engineering
- David Leonard – mixing
- Stephen Marcussen – mastering
- Diego Uchitel – photography
- Bob Venosa – design
- Peter Wolf – arranging, production

== Charts ==
Chart (1990)	Peak position
Australian Albums (ARIA)	105
Austrian Albums (Ö3 Austria)	28
Canada Top Albums/CDs (RPM)	99
Dutch Albums (Album Top 100)	66
Finnish Albums (The Official Finnish Charts)	38
German Albums (Offizielle Top 100)	34
Swiss Albums (Schweizer Hitparade)	19
UK Albums (Official Charts)	68
US Billboard 200	85
