= Amigos (Santana album) =

Studio album by Santana
- Released: March 26, 1976
- Studio: Wally Heider Studios San Francisco
- Genre: Jazz fusion; funk rock; latin rock; rock en Español
- Length: 41:14
- Label: Columbia
- Producer: David Rubinson

Santana chronology
Borboletta (1974)	Amigos (1976)	Festival (1977)

Singles from Amigos
- 1. "Let It Shine" Released: 1976

Professional ratings
Review scores
Source	Rating
Allmusic	4/5 stars
Christgau's Record Guide	B
Rolling Stone	(not rated)
The Rolling Stone Album Guide	4/5 stars

Amigos is the seventh studio album by Santana released in 1976. It generated a minor U.S. hit single in "Let It Shine" and was the band's first album to hit the top ten on the Billboard charts since Caravanserai in 1972 (it ultimately reached gold record status). In Europe, the song "Europa" was released as a single and became a top ten hit in several countries.

New vocalist Greg Walker joined the group. It would be the last Santana album to include original bassist David Brown.

This album was mixed and released in stereo and quadraphonic versions.

== Album design ==
Amigos was designed by Japanese artist Tadanori Yokoo. The cover features a psychedelic-style Mayan man and woman standing on a jungle cliff, surrounded by vintage advertising imagery of drumming “natives,” wild animals, and a looming black void. The interior artwork includes images of Jesus, Buddha, and Kali set against cosmic backdrops, full-bleed gold printing, an Archigram-like diagram of a pyramid concert, and live photographs from a Santana performance.

Yokoo had previously designed the cover for Lotus (1974), which holds the record for the most facings on a gatefold vinyl LP (22). The elaborate packaging created for this recording of Santana’s Tour of Japan was produced by CBS/Sony and cost approximately £30,000 to manufacture.

== Track listing ==
Side one

1. "Dance Sister Dance (Baila Mi Hermana)" (Leon Chancler, Tom Coster, David Rubinson) – 8:15
2. "Take Me with You" (instrumental) (Leon Chancler, Tom Coster) – 5:27
3. "Let Me" (Tom Coster, Carlos Santana) – 4:51

Side two

1. "Gitano" (Armando Peraza) – 6:13
2. "Tell Me Are You Tired" (Leon Chancler, Tom Coster) – 5:42
3. "Europa (Earth's Cry Heaven's Smile)" (instrumental) (Tom Coster, Carlos Santana) – 5:06
4. "Let It Shine" (David Brown, Ray Gardner) – 5:43

== Personnel ==
- Greg Walker – vocals
- Carlos Santana – guitars, background vocals, percussion, congas, güiro
- Tom Coster – acoustic piano, Fender Rhodes electric piano, Hammond organ, Moog synthesizer, ARP Pro Soloist, ARP Odyssey, ARP String Ensemble, Hohner Clavinet D6, background vocals
- David Brown – bass guitar
- Leon "Ndugu" Chancler – drums, timbales, Remo Rototoms, percussion, congas, background vocals
- Armando Peraza – congas, bongos, background vocals, vocal on "Gitano"
- Ivory Stone – background vocals
- Julia Tillman Waters – background vocals
- Maxine Willard Waters – background vocals

== Charts ==
=== Weekly charts ===
Chart (1976–1977)	Peak position
Australian Albums (Kent Music Report)	9
Austrian Albums (Ö3 Austria)	9
Canada Top Albums/CDs (RPM)	9
Dutch Albums (Album Top 100)	2
Finnish Albums (The Official Finnish Charts)	9
French Albums (SNEP)	5
German Albums (Offizielle Top 100)	8
Italian Albums (Musica e Dischi)	1
Japanese Albums (Oricon)	5
New Zealand Albums (RMNZ)	8
Norwegian Albums (VG-lista)	13
Spanish Albums (AFE)	1
Swedish Albums (Sverigetopplistan)	29
UK Albums (OCC)	13
US Billboard Top LPs & Tape	10
US Soul LPs (Billboard)	8

=== Year-end charts ===
Chart (1976)	Position
Canada Top Albums/CDs (RPM)	70
Dutch Albums (Album Top 100)	11
German Albums (Offizielle Top 100)	13
New Zealand Albums (RMNZ)	35
US Billboard 200	75

== Certifications and sales ==
Region	Certification	Certified units/sales
Canada (Music Canada)	Gold	50,000^{^}
France (SNEP)	2× Gold	200,000^{*}
Germany	—	150,000
Italy	—	160,000
Netherlands (NVPI)	Gold	35,000
United Kingdom (BPI)	Silver	60,000^{^}
United States (RIAA)	Gold	500,000^{^}
^{*} Sales figures based on certification alone.^{^} Shipments figures based on certification alone.
