= Zebop! =

Studio album by Santana
- Released: April 29, 1981
- Studios: The Automatt, San Francisco, California
- Genres: Rock; jazz fusion
- Length: 47:12
- Label: Columbia
- Producers: Carlos Santana, Bill Graham, Keith Olsen

Santana chronology
Marathon (1979)	Zebop! (1981)	Shangó (1982)

Singles from Zebop!
- 1. "Changes" Released: 1981; 2. "Searchin'" Released: 1981; 3. "Winning" Released: 1981; 4. "The Sensitive Kind" Released: 1981

Professional ratings
Review scores
Source	Rating
AllMusic	2.5/5 stars
Rolling Stone	2/5 stars

Zebop! is the 12th studio album by the American rock band Santana. The album had several releases, and various different color cover backgrounds, including pink and red. The album featured "Winning"; along with the following album Shangó, both the album and single were one of Santana's last top 40 hits until 1999 with the band’s release of Supernatural.

== Critical reception ==
Billboard said that there was "nothing new or revolutionary" on Zebop!, which carried the band's "usual professional treatment." Cashbox wrote that Zebop! "stands as a voyage into that hypnotic Latino style of yesteryear". They believed that some of the material harkened back to Santana's Abraxas era, concluding that it "illustrate[s] that the salsa style rock that Santana pioneered is still as infectious as ever." Record World thought that the album carried "imaginative interpretations of great songs", citing "Changes" and "Winning" as examples.

== Track listing ==
=== Side one ===
1. "Changes" (Cat Stevens) – 4:27
2. "É Papa Ré" (Carlos Santana, Richard Baker, David Margen, Orestes Vilató, Alex Ligertwood) – 4:32
3. "Primera Invasion" (Lear, Margen, Alan Pasqua, Santana) – 2:08
4. "Searchin'" (Ligertwood, Santana, Chris Solberg) – 3:54
5. "Over and Over" (Rick Meyers) – 4:46
6. "Winning" (Russ Ballard) – 3:28

=== Side two ===
1. "Tales of Kilimanjaro" (Pasqua, Armando Peraza, Raul Rekow, Santana) – 3:24
2. "The Sensitive Kind" (J.J. Cale) – 3:32
3. "American Gypsy" (Ligertwood, Peraza, Santana, D. Margen, G. Lear, O. Vilató, R. Rekow, R. Baker) – 3:39
4. "I Love You Much Too Much" (Alexander Olshanetsky, Don Raye, Chaim Tauber) – 4:43
5. "Brightest Star" (Ligertwood, Santana) – 4:49
6. "Hannibal" (Ligertwood, Pasqua, Rekow, Santana) – 3:41

== Personnel ==
- Alex Ligertwood – vocals, background vocals
- Carlos Santana – guitar, percussion, producer, vocals, background vocals
- Richard Baker – keyboards, organ, piano, synthesizer
- David Margen – bass
- Graham Lear – drums
- Armando Peraza – bongos, percussion, vocals
- Raul Rekow – congas, percussion, background vocals
- Orestes Vilató – percussion, timbales, background vocals

Special thanks:

- Alan Pasqua – keyboards, vocals, background vocals (tracks 3, 4 & 6)
- Chris Solberg – guitar, keyboards, vocals, background vocals (tracks 3, 4 & 6)

Technical

- Bill Graham – producer
- Keith Olsen – engineer, producer
- Fred Catero – associate producer, engineer

== Charts ==
=== Weekly charts ===
Chart (1981)	Peak position
Australian Albums (Kent Music Report)	14
Austrian Albums (Ö3 Austria)	12
Canada Top Albums/CDs (RPM)	16
Dutch Albums (Album Top 100)	20
Finnish Albums (The Official Finnish Charts)	12
French Albums (SNEP)	2
German Albums (Offizielle Top 100)	21
Italian Albums (Musica e Dischi)	25
Japanese Albums (Oricon)	49
New Zealand Albums (RMNZ)	23
Norwegian Albums (VG-lista)	3
Swedish Albums (Sverigetopplistan)	9
UK Albums (Official Charts)	33
US Billboard Top LPs & Tape	9
US Soul LPs (Billboard)	36

=== Year-end charts ===
Chart (1981)	Position
US Billboard 200	32

== Certifications ==
Region	Certification	Certified units/sales
France (SNEP)	Gold	100,000^{*}
United States (RIAA)	Platinum	1,000,000^{^}
^{*} Sales figures based on certification alone.^{^} Shipments figures based on certification alone.

== Music videos ==
Six videos were shot from this album on video with multiple cameras in a mock concert setting on what was then the A&M Stage at A&M Records, on La Brea Avenue, Los Angeles, California (now owned by the Jim Henson Company). They were directed by Bruce Gowers and produced by Paul Flattery. The Director of Photography was Jerry Watson. The tracks shot were:

1. "Changes"
2. "E Papa Ré"
3. "Searchin'"
4. "Over and Over"
5. "Winning" (Russ Ballard) – 3:28
6. "I Love You Much Too Much"
