= Milagro (Santana album) =

Studio album by Santana
- Released: May 1992
- Studio: The Record Plant (Sausalito, California)
- Genre: Latin rock; hard rock
- Length: 71:14
- Label: Polydor
- Producer: Carlos Santana, Chester D. Thompson

Santana chronology
Spirits Dancing in the Flesh (1990)	Milagro (1992)	Sacred Fire: Live in South America (1993)

Professional ratings
Review scores
Source	Rating
Allmusic	3/5 stars
Entertainment Weekly	C−
Rolling Stone	4/5 stars

Milagro is the seventeenth studio album by Santana, released in 1992. Milagro, which means "miracle" in Spanish, was dedicated to the lives of Miles Davis and Bill Graham, and was Santana's first album on the Polydor label after twenty-two years with Columbia Records. The album reached 102 in the Billboard 200. The album was recorded and mixed fully digitally using the Studer Dyaxis system.

As of 2020, this is the band Santana's only studio album not owned by Sony Music Entertainment, the successor of Sony BMG, a company formed by the merger of Columbia's parent (the original) Sony Music Entertainment and BMG, the parent of Santana's former label Arista Records. The album is owned by Universal Music Group, which was formed by the 1999 merger of the PolyGram and MCA label families.

== Track listing ==
1. "Introduction — Bill Graham (Milagro)" (M. Johnson, Bob Marley, Carlos Santana) – 7:36
2. "Somewhere in Heaven" (Alex Ligertwood, Santana) – 9:59
3. "Saja/Right On" (Joe Roccisano/Earl DeRouen, Marvin Gaye) – 8:51
4. "Your Touch" (Santana, Chester D. Thompson) – 6:35
5. "Life Is for Living" (Pat Sefolosha) – 4:41
6. "Red Prophet" (Instrumental) (Benny Rietveld) – 5:37
7. "Agua que va caer" (Carlos Valdes, Eugene "Totico" Arango) – 4:24
8. "Make Somebody Happy" (Santana, Ligertwood) – 4:14
9. "Free All the People (South Africa)" (Jackie Holmes) – 6:06
10. "Gypsy/Grajonca" (Santana, Thompson) – 7:10
11. "We Don't Have to Wait" (Santana, Armando Peraza, Thompson) – 4:35
12. "A Dios" (Santana, John Coltrane, Gil Evans) – 1:21

== Personnel ==
- Carlos Santana — guitar, vocals
- Chester D. Thompson — keyboards, horn/string arrangements, backing vocals
- Benny Rietveld — bass
- Walfredo Reyes, Jr. — Drums, percussion
- Raul Rekow — timbales, percussion, vocals
- Karl Perazzo — timbales, guiro, quinto, bongo, vocals
- Billy Johnson — drums ("Right On" and "Your Touch")
- Tony Lindsay — vocals ("Life Is for Living", "Make Somebody Happy")
- Alex Ligertwood — vocals ("Somewhere in Heaven")
- Larry Graham — vocals ("Right On")
- Rebeca Mauleon — piano ("Agua que va a caer")
- Wayne Wallace — trombone ("Agua que va caer", "Free All the People" and "Milagro")
- Bill Ortiz — trumpet ("Agua que va caer", "Free All the People" and "Milagro")
- Robert Kwock — trumpet ("Agua que va caer", "Free All the people" and "Milagro")
- Melecio Magdaluyo — saxophone ("Agua que va caer", "Free All the People" and "Milagro")
- Bad River Singers — vocal chant ("Agua que va caer")
- John Philip Shenale — string programming
- Lygia Ferragallo — backing vocals
- Bill Graham - spoken word ("Milagro")
- Martin Luther King Jr. - spoken word as taken from I Have a Dream ("Somewhere in Heaven")

== Charts ==
Chart (1992)	Peak position
Australian Albums (ARIA)	151
Austrian Albums (Ö3 Austria)	31
Dutch Albums (Album Top 100)	51
German Albums (Offizielle Top 100)	47
Swiss Albums (Schweizer Hitparade)	11
US Billboard 200	102
