= Inner Secrets =

Studio album by Santana
- Released: October 1978
- Recorded: July–August 1978
- Studios: Western Recorders (Hollywood, California)
- Genre: Rock
- Length: 42:48
- Label: Columbia
- Producers: Brian Potter, Dennis Lambert

Santana chronology
Moonflower (1977)	Inner Secrets (1978)	Marathon (1979)

Singles from Inner Secrets
- 1. "Well All Right" / "Wham!" Released: 1978; 2. "Move On" / "Stormy" Released: 1979; 3. "One Chain (Don't Make No Prison)" / "Move On" or "Wham!" or "Life Is a Lady/Holiday" Released: 1979>; 4. "Life Is a Lady/Holiday" (as "Life Is a Lady") / "Move On" Released: 1979; 5. "Open Invitation" / "Move On" Released: 1979

Inner Secrets is the tenth studio album by Santana. It was released in 1978 and, unlike the fusion of Latin, jazz, rock, and spirituality that characterized previous records, it was considered a rock album.

"Stormy" and "One Chain (Don't Make No Prison)" were both hit singles. In the Netherlands "Well All Right" was released as a single and reached #22 in the top 40.

Most CD releases of Inner Secrets use a different version of track 3, "One Chain (Don't Make No Prison)", than the one that appeared on the original LP, Columbia FC 35600. The version used on most CD releases is an extended disco mix (running time 7:10), that appeared on a 12” single (Columbia 23-10957). The original album version of the track is available on CD in a Japanese Mini LP sleeve, Sony Music SICP 2875, released in 2010 (running time 6:13).

The only two tracks on the album that were not released as singles are "Dealer/Spanish Rose" and "The Facts of Love".

The album cover photo by Norman Seeff divided the nine-piece lineup between the front and back cover, with Chris Solberg, Pete Escovedo, Raul Rekow and Greg Walker shown with Carlos Santana on the front while David Margen, Armando Peraza, Graham Lear and Chris Rhyne appeared on the back.

== Critical reception ==
Professional ratings
Review scores
Source	Rating
AllMusic	2/5 stars
Christgau's Record Guide	C+
Rolling Stone	(not rated)
The Rolling Stone Album Guide	2/5 stars

The Globe and Mail wrote that "the former fusion-jazz experiments as well as the earlier Latin and acid-rock influences have all been evened out on this album in an attempt to emphasize Carlos Santana the rocker."

== Cover songs on the album ==
Several of the album's tracks are covers:

- The "Dealer" portion of "Dealer/Spanish Rose" is a cover of the song "Dealer" by Traffic appearing on their 1967 album, Mr. Fantasy
- "One Chain (Don't Make No Prison)" is a cover of a Four Tops song "One Chain Don't Make No Prison" appearing on their 1974 album Meeting of the Minds, and as a single on the same year
- "Well All Right" is a cover of the Buddy Holly song "Well... All Right" (appearing as B-side of Holly's 1958 single "Heartbeat") and it was covered earlier by Blind Faith on their 1969 self-titled and only studio album Blind Faith
- "Stormy" is a cover of the Classics IV's 1968 top-10 hit (Hot 100 No. 5) and included on their 1968 album Mamas and Papas/Soul Train, and 1970 album Stormy

== Track listing ==
=== Side one ===
1. "Dealer/Spanish Rose" (Jim Capaldi/Carlos Santana) – 5:50
2. "Move On" (Santana, Chris Rhyne) – 4:27
3. "One Chain (Don't Make No Prison)" (Dennis Lambert, Brian Potter) – 6:13
4. "Stormy" (Buddy Buie, James Cobb) – 4:45

=== Side two ===
1. "Well All Right" (Buddy Holly, Jerry Allison, Joe B. Mauldin, Norman Petty,) – 4:09
2. "Open Invitation" (Santana, Lambert, Potter, Greg Walker, David Margen) – 4:45
3. "Life Is a Lady/Holiday" (Lambert/Santana) – 3:47
4. "The Facts of Love" (Lambert, Potter) – 5:28
5. "Wham!" (Santana, Graham Lear, Armando Peraza, Raul Rekow, Pete Escovedo) – 3:24

=== CD Reissue ===
1. "Dealer/Spanish Rose" (Capaldi/Santana) – 5:50
2. "Move On" (Santana, Rhyne) – 4:27
3. "One Chain (Don't Make No Prison)" (Extended disco version) (Lambert, Potter) – 7:13
4. "Stormy" (Buie, Cobb) – 4:45
5. "Well All Right" (Holly, Allison, Mauldin, Petty) – 4:09
6. "Open Invitation" (Santana, Lambert, Potter, Walker, Margen) – 4:45
7. "Life Is a Lady/Holiday" (Lambert/Santana) – 3:47
8. "The Facts of Love" (Lambert, Potter) – 5:28
9. "Wham!" (Santana, Lear, Peraza, Rekow, Escovedo) – 3:24

== Personnel ==
- Greg Walker – lead vocals
- Carlos Santana – guitar, backing vocals
- Chris Solberg – guitar, backing vocals
- Chris Rhyne – keyboards
- David Margen – bass
- Graham Lear – drums
- Armando Peraza – percussion, backing vocals
- Raul Rekow – percussion, backing vocals
- Pete Escovedo – percussion
- Dennis Lambert – clavinet, backing vocals
- Mike Boddicker – synthesizer programming

Technical

- Mick Brigden – artwork, cover concept
- Norman Seeff – design, art director, photography

== Charts ==
Chart (1978–1979)	Peak position
Australian Albums (Kent Music Report)	5
Austrian Albums (Ö3 Austria)	19
Canada Top Albums/CDs (RPM)	25
Dutch Albums (Album Top 100)	7
Finnish Albums (The Official Finnish Charts)	8
French Albums (SNEP)	3
German Albums (Offizielle Top 100)	11
Italian Albums (Musica e Dischi)	8
Japanese Albums (Oricon)	35
New Zealand Albums (RMNZ)	20
Norwegian Albums (VG-lista)	17
Swedish Albums (Sverigetopplistan)	14
UK Albums (Official Charts)	17
US Billboard Top LPs & Tape	27
US Soul LPs (Billboard)	36

== Certifications ==
Region	Certification	Certified units/sales
Canada (Music Canada)	Gold	50,000^{^}
France (SNEP)	Gold	100,000^{*}
New Zealand (RMNZ)	Gold	7,500^{^}
United Kingdom (BPI)	Gold	100,000^{^}
United States (RIAA)	Gold	500,000^{^}
^{*} Sales figures based on certification alone.^{^} Shipments figures based on certification alone.
