= Tom Coster =

American keyboardist and composer

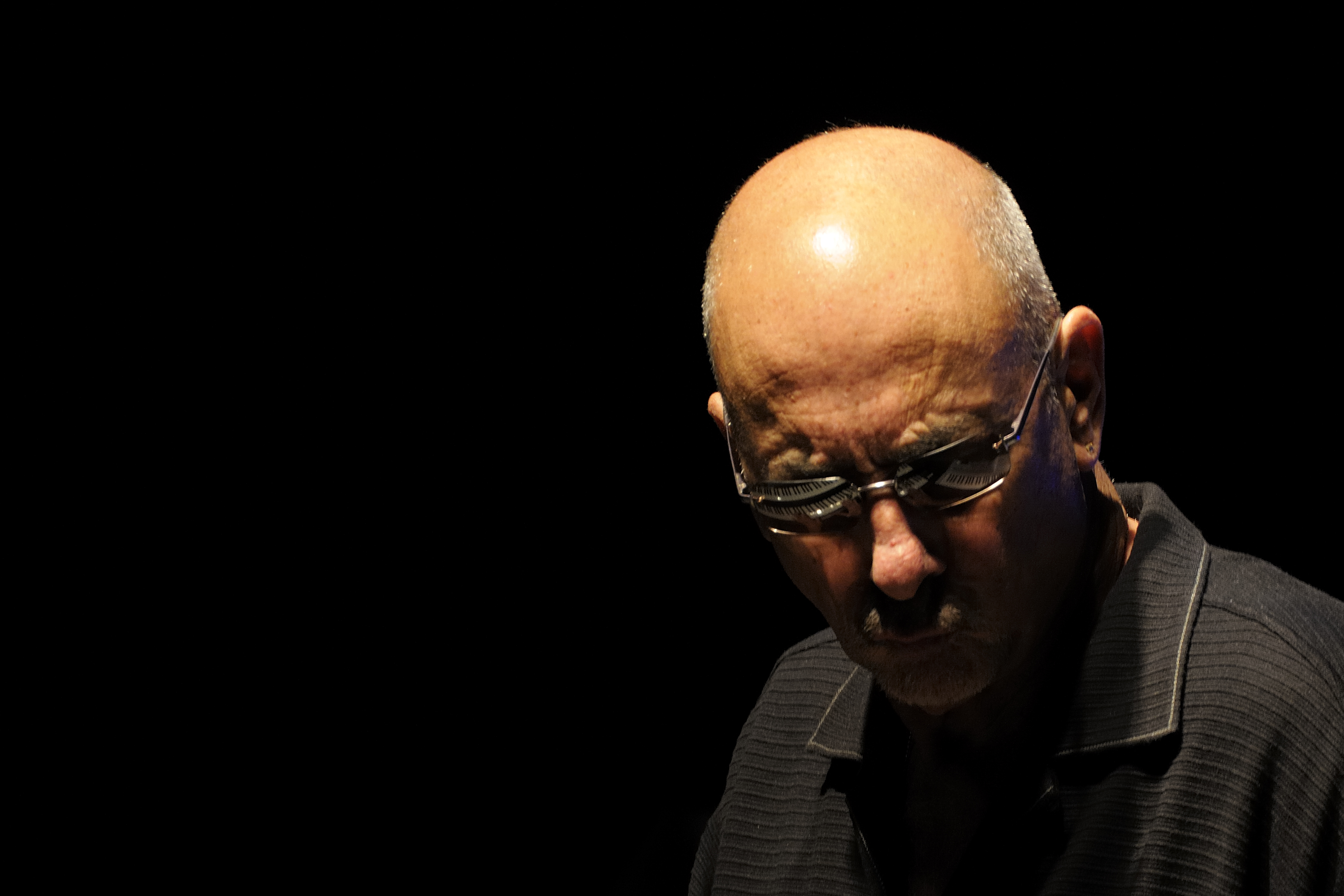
- Coster in 2009

Background information
- Born: August 21, 1941 (age 85); Detroit, Michigan, U.S.
- Genres: Rock, Latin rock, jazz fusion, classical
- Occupations: Musician, composer
- Instrument: Keyboards

Tom Coster (born August 21, 1941) is an American keyboardist, composer, and longtime backing musician for Carlos Santana.

== Early years ==
Detroit-born and San Francisco-raised, Coster played piano and accordion as a youth, continuing his studies through college and a productive five-year stint as a musician in the U.S. Air Force Band.

== Career ==
Coster has played with and/or composed for many groups and musicians including The Loading Zone, Gábor Szabó, Carlos Santana, Billy Cobham, Third Eye Blind, Coryell/Coster/Smith, Claudio Baglioni, Stu Hamm, Boz Scaggs, Zucchero and Bobby Holiday, Joe Satriani, Frank Gambale, and Vital Information. Coster also produced several solo jazz fusion recordings as a leader for Fantasy, Headfirst, and JVC.

Some of Coster's best-known compositions are "Europa (Earth's Cry Heaven's Smile)", "Flor D'Luna (Moonflower)" and "Dance, Sister, Dance (Baila Mi Hermana)" performed by Santana and "The Perfect Date" performed by Vital Information.

== Personal life ==
Coster's son was born in 1966, is also called Tom Coster, and also a keyboardist and composer.

== Solo discography and personnel ==
- T.C. (Fantasy, 1981)
  - Tom Coster - keyboards, Linn-1 drum machine programming
  - Joaquin Lievano - guitar
  - Randy Jackson - bass
  - Steve Smith - drums
- Ivory Expeditions (Fantasy, 1983)
  - Tom Coster - keyboards
  - Joaquin Lievano - guitar
  - Randy Jackson - bass
  - Steve Smith - drums
  - Walter Afanasieff - additional keyboards
  - Tommy Coster - additional keyboards
- Did Jah Miss Me?!? (Headfirst/JVC, 1989)
  - Tom Coster - keyboards
  - Tommy Coster - keyboards
  - Jordan Rudess - keyboards
  - Ernie Watts - alto, soprano and tenor saxophones, and Yamaha WX-7 wind driver
  - Norbert Stachel - tenor saxophone
  - Frank Gambale - acoustic and electric guitars
  - Randy Jackson - electric bass
  - Dennis Chambers - drums
  - Steve Smith - drums
  - Larry Grenadier - acoustic bass
- From Me to You (Headfirst/JVC, 1990)
  - Tom Coster - keyboards
  - Tommy Coster - keyboards
  - Mark Russo - saxophones
  - Corrado Rustci - guitar
  - Kai-Eckhardt Karpeh - bass
  - William Kennedy - drums
  - Armando Peraza - congas, bongos
  - Jimi Tunnell - vocals
- Gotcha (JVC, 1992)
  - Tom Coster - keyboards, computer programming, synth and drum programming
  - Mark Russo - saxophones
  - Chris Camozzi - guitar
  - Alphonso Johnson - electric and fretless bass
  - Dennis Chambers - drums
  - Norbert Stachel - saxophones
- Let's Set the Record Straight (JVC, 1993)
  - Tom Coster - keyboards
  - Bob Berg - saxophones
  - Frank Gambale - acoustic and electric guitars
  - Alphonso Johnson - electric and fretless bass
  - Dennis Chambers - drums
  - Raul Rekow - congas, bata, vocals
  - Karl Perazzo - congas, bongos
  - Steve Smith - drums
  - Tommy Coster - Producer, keyboards and synth
- The Forbidden Zone (JVC, 1994)
  - Tom Coster - keyboards, synthe bass
  - Bob Berg - tenor saxophone
  - Scott Henderson - guitars
  - Jeff Andrews - electric bass
  - Alphonso Johnson - electric and fretless bass
  - Dennis Chambers - drums
  - Raul Rekow - congas, bata, chekere, vocal chant
  - Karl Perazzo - timbales, congas, miscellaneous percussion
  - Tommy Coster - Producer
- Interstate '76 Soundtrack (w/Bullmark) (Activision, 1996)
  - Tom Coster - keyboards
  - Arion Salazar (Third Eye Blind) - electric bass
  - Bryan Mantia (Primus) - drums & percussion
  - Jon Bendich -
  - Les Harris (Curveball) -
  - Dave Schul (Curveball) -
- From the Street (JVC, 1996)
  - Tom Coster - keyboards, synth bass
  - Bob Malach - tenor saxophone
  - Michael Brecker - tenor saxophone
  - Dean Brown - rhythm guitar
  - Steve Cardenas - lead guitar
  - Dennis Chambers - drums
  - Sheila E. - percussion
  - Stu Hamm - electric bass
  - Mark Isham - trumpet and cornet
  - Tim Landers - electric and acoustic bass
  - Tommy Coster - Producer
