= Hold On (Ian Thomas song) =

- Side A of the US single

Single by Santana

from the album Shangó
- B-side: "Oxun (Oshun)"
- Released: August 1982
- Genre: Adult-oriented rock
- Length: 4:33 (album version); 3:49 (single version)
- Label: Columbia
- Songwriter: Ian Thomas
- Producer: John Ryan for Chicago Kid Productions

Santana singles chronology
"The Sensitive Kind" (1981)	"Hold On" (1982)	"Nowhere to Run" (1982)

Music video
- "Hold On" on YouTube

"Hold On" is a song written and first recorded by the Canadian singer and songwriter Ian Thomas, on his 1981 album The Runner. His version reached No. 28 on the Canadian pop singles chart.

== Santana cover ==
In 1982 the Latin rock band Santana, featuring lead vocalist Alex Ligertwood, covered the song for Santana's album Shangó. It is the second track on the album and was released as the album's first single. The song reached No. 15 on the U.S. Billboard Hot 100, making it Santana's tenth most successful US hit. It also peaked at No. 17 on the Billboard rock chart. On the Cashbox chart, it reached No. 9.

In Canada, "Hold On" peaked at No. 4 for two weeks.

=== Music video ===
The music video, directed by John Mark Robinson, features Carlos Santana at a masquerade ball with his then-wife Deborah King as the intended object of his affection, his bandmate Orestes Vilató as his accompanying friend, and actor Henry Darrow as the prize wheel spinner.

== Charts ==
=== Ian Thomas ===
Chart (1981)	Peak position
Canadian Singles (RPM)	28
Canadian AC Singles (RPM)	20

=== Santana ===
==== Weekly charts ====
Chart (1982)	Peak position
Australian Singles (Kent Music Report)	64
Belgium (Ultratop 50 Flanders)	19
Canadian Singles (RPM)	4
Canada Adult Contemporary (RPM)	19
Netherlands (Dutch Top 40)	14
Netherlands (Single Top 100)	22
New Zealand (Recorded Music NZ)	31
US Billboard Hot 100	15
US Adult Contemporary (Billboard)	34
US Mainstream Rock (Billboard)	17

==== Year-end charts ====
Chart (1982)	Peak position
US Cash Box	61
Canada Top Singles (RPM)	40
