= No One to Depend On =

Single by Santana

from the album Santana III
- B-side: "Taboo"
- Released: January 12, 1972
- Recorded: 1971
- Genre: Latin rock
- Length: 5:31
- Label: Columbia
- Songwriters: Mike Carabello, Coke Escovedo, Gregg Rolie, Willie Bobo (uncredited), Melvin Lastie (uncredited)
- Producer: Santana

Santana singles chronology
"Everybody's Everything" (1971)	"No One to Depend On" (1972)	"Europa" (1976)

"No One to Depend On" is a song by Latin rock band Santana, from their 1971 album, Santana III. The main melody of the song is taken from "Spanish Grease", first recorded by Willie Bobo in 1965. It was written by Mike Carabello, Coke Escovedo, and Gregg Rolie.

== Background ==
It is the second track on the first side of the LP album and was released as its second single. The song is very instrumentally based, with numerous bass and guitar riffs and a long instrumental introduction. The vocals start after 56 seconds. At the start of the song, a man can be heard saying something in Spanish. It is commonly believed to be the Spanish phrase, "Salpica Micaela", said by José "Chepito" Areas himself to the other musicians about the style (rhythm or "feel") to play the song. The song is famous for its "call and response" passage between the guitar and the bass.

In a 50-year retrospective on the album and the song "No One to Depend On", Glide Magazine opined;

Apart from Rolie's sensuous singing—hear especially "No One to Depend On"–most of the insinuating dynamics much in the music derives from Michael Shrieve's versatility at his drum kit. His alternately delicate and utterly abandoned touch is altogether reminiscent of his solo as highlighted in the Woodstock movie.

== Charts ==
Chart (1972)	Peak position
Canada Top Singles (RPM)	17
US Billboard Hot 100	36

== Popular culture ==
- A live version of the song features on the 2009 videogame, Guitar Hero 5, in which Carlos Santana himself is a guest character.
- Vitamin C samples the song's chorus on her 1999 song "Me, Myself and I".
