= Alex Ligertwood =

Scottish singer (1946–2026)

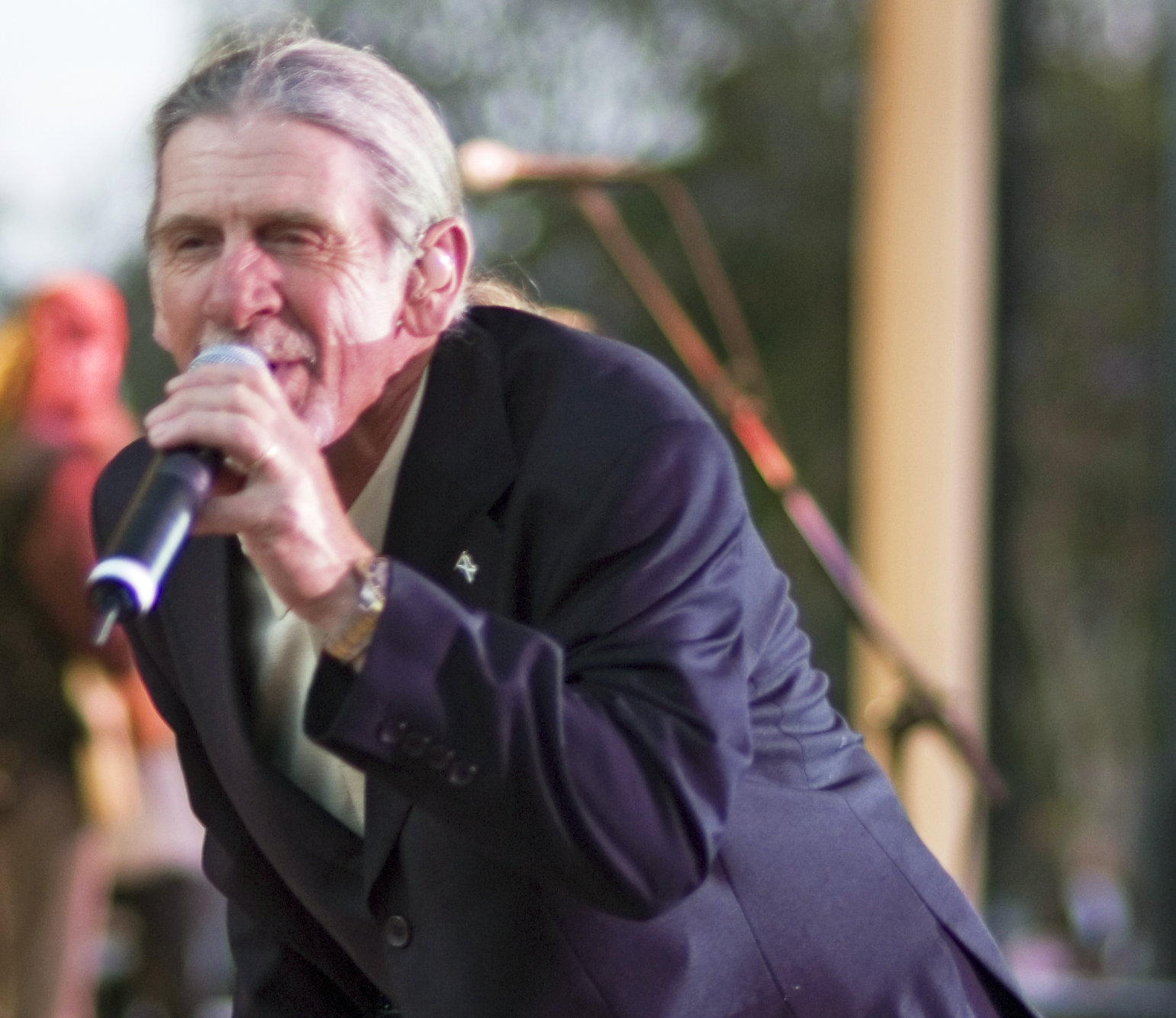
- Ligertwood performing in 2007

Background information
- Born: Alexander John Ligertwood; 18 December 1946; Glasgow, Scotland
- Origin: Chipping Barnet, London, England
- Died: 30 April 2026 (aged 79) Santa Monica, California, US
- Occupations: Musician
- Instruments: Vocals, guitar, drums
- Years active: 1965–2026
- Formerly of: Average White Band; Go Ahead; The Jeff Beck Group; Santana; The Senate; Troc

Alexander John Ligertwood (/ˈlɪdʒərtwʊd/; LIH-jərt-wuud; 18 December 1946 – 30 April 2026) was a Scottish singer, guitarist and drummer.

== Early life, family and education ==
Ligertwood was born in Drumchapel, Glasgow, Scotland on 18 December 1946. He grew up in a musical family, but did not receive formal musical training. Eventually achieving a vocal range covering nearly four octaves, Ligertwood has said, "Every song should have its own thing. Just like you can change the tones on a guitar, I can change the tone on my voice and sing the song the way it should be. I’m really into that, and using my voice as much as possible."

== Career ==
Ligertwood took up guitar during the 1950s skiffle boom after singing in school choirs and playing in the Boys’ Brigade pipe band. He joined a skiffle group called The Meridians and also played with The Kwintones before joining The Senate, a seven-piece soul band.

He named Motown, soul and rhythm and blues as key formative influences, especially artists such as Ray Charles, Sam Cooke, Marvin Gaye, Otis Redding and Curtis Mayfield.

Ligertwood was best known as a lead vocalist for Santana, with five different stints from 1979 to 1994, which included the US Festival in 1982 and Live Aid in 1985. He was credited as lead vocalist on Santana songs such as "All I Ever Wanted," "You Know That I Love You," "Winning" and "Hold On." He also had co-writing credits for Santana songs including "Brightest Star," "E Papa Re," "Make Somebody Happy," "Somewhere in Heaven" and "The Nile."

He additionally performed with the Jeff Beck Group and Brian Auger's Oblivion Express. He has also appeared with John Cipollina and friends, the Average White Band and David Sancious.

Ligertwood sang lead vocals on the song "Crank It Up" by The Dregs, (previously known as the Dixie Dregs), from the album Industry Standard (1982), and sang on "Double Bad" from Jeff Lorber's album In the Heat of the Night (1984).

In 1972, he was a member of the short lived band Troc with drummer André Ceccarelli, bassist Jannick Top, pianist Henri Giordano and guitarist Jacky Giraudo. From 1986 to 1988, Ligertwood was a member of Go Ahead with Bill Kreutzmann, David Margen, and Brent Mydland.

During 2000, he toured with World Classic Rockers. He sang on a cover of the Scorpions song "Is There Anybody There," which appeared on drummer Herman Rarebell's solo album Acoustic Fever (2013). In 2014, he toured in Japan and Europe with Brian Auger and the Oblivion Express and was invited by producer Gerry Gallagher to record with Latin rock band El Chicano.

In 2019, Ligertwood released the album Outside the Box on Creatchy Records, produced by David Garfield. It featured a remake of Santana's "Winning."

Alex's last performance took place at Bogart's Entertainment Center (Apple Valley, MN) on Friday 10 April 2026.

== Death ==
Ligertwood died at his home in Santa Monica, California, on 30 April 2026, at the age of 79.
