= Festival (Santana album) =

Festivál

Studio album by Santana
- Released: January 1977
- Recorded: 1976
- Genres: Jazz fusion; chicano rock; latin rock
- Length: 45:32
- Label: Columbia
- Producers: David Rubinson & Friends, Inc.

Santana chronology
Amigos (1976)	Festivál (1977)	Moonflower (1977)

Singles from Festivál
- 1. "Let the Children Play" Released: 1977; 2. "Jugando" Released: 1977; 3. "Verão Vermelho" Released: 1977

Festivál is the eighth studio album by Santana, released in January 1977. It peaked number twenty seven in the Billboard Top LPs & Tape chart and number twenty nine in the Soul LPs chart.

This was the band's second and last album with Leon Patillo on vocals, and the last full-studio album for longtime members keyboardist Tom Coster and percussionist José "Chepitó" Areas. It also was the first one with percussionist Raul Rekow, who would remain with the band until 2013 (save for 1987–1990).

Leon Patillo would later record a version of "The River" for his 1982 album I'll Never Stop Lovin' You, retitled just "River".

== Critical reception ==
Professional ratings
Review scores
Source	Rating
AllMusic	3/5 stars
Christgau's Record Guide	C+
The Rolling Stone Album Guide	3/5 stars

Rolling Stone wrote: "Though this record is far stronger on the whole than Amigos, it lacks that album’s memorable chordal quirks and peaks of intensity, sometimes sounding like a prisoner of its own commercial aspirations."

== Track listing ==
=== Side one ===
1. "Carnaval" (Tom Coster, Carlos Santana) – 2:15
2. "Let the Children Play" (Leon Patillo, Santana) – 3:28
3. "Jugando" (José Areas, Santana) – 2:12
4. "Give Me Love" (Pablo Téllez) – 4:29
5. "Verão Vermelho" (Nonato Buzar) – 5:00
6. "Let the Music Set You Free" (Coster, Patillo, David Rubinson, Santana) – 3:39

=== Side two ===
1. "Revelations" (Coster, Santana) – 4:37
2. "Reach Up" (Coster, Paul Jackson, Patillo, Santana) – 5:23
3. "The River" (Patillo, Santana) – 4:53
4. "Try a Little Harder" (Patillo) – 5:04
5. "María Caracóles" (Pello el Afrokán - credited "P. African") – 4:32

== Personnel ==
- Oren Waters – vocals, background vocals
- Maxine Willard Waters – vocals, background vocals
- Francisco Zavala – vocals, background vocals
- Carlos Santana – guitar, bass, percussion, vocals, background vocals
- Leon Patillo – keyboards, percussion, piano, vocals, background vocals
- Tom Coster – keyboards, percussion, synthesizer, vocals
- Pablo Téllez – bass, percussion, vocals, background vocals
- Paul Jackson – bass
- Gaylord Birch – drums, percussion, tympani
- José "Chepitó" Areas – conga, percussion, timbales
- Raul Rekow – conga, percussion, background vocals
- Joel Badie – percussion, vocals, background vocals
- Julia Waters – background vocals

Production:

- Fred Catero – engineer
- David Rubinson – engineer, producer

== Charts ==
Chart (1977)	Peak position
Australian Albums (Kent Music Report)	25
Austrian Albums (Ö3 Austria)	9
Canada Top Albums/CDs (RPM)	11
Dutch Albums (Album Top 100)	11
German Albums (Offizielle Top 100)	15
Italian Albums (Musica e Dischi)	3
Japanese Albums (Oricon)	8
New Zealand Albums (RMNZ)	37
Swedish Albums (Sverigetopplistan)	37
UK Albums (Official Charts)	27
US Billboard Top LPs & Tape	27
US Soul LPs (Billboard)	29

== Certifications ==
Region	Certification	Certified units/sales
France (SNEP)	Gold	100,000^{*}
United Kingdom (BPI)	Silver	60,000^{^}
United States (RIAA)	Gold	500,000^{^}
^{*} Sales figures based on certification alone.^{^} Shipments figures based on certification alone.
