= Europa (Earth's Cry Heaven's Smile) =

Instrumental by Santana

from the album Amigos
- Released: March 26, 1976
- Studio: Wally Heider Studios (San Francisco, California)
- Genre: Instrumental rock
- Length: 5:06 (album version); 3:37 (radio edit)
- Label: Columbia
- Songwriters: Carlos Santana; Tom Coster
- Producer: David Rubinson

"Europa (Earth's Cry Heaven's Smile)" is an instrumental from the Santana album Amigos, written by Carlos Santana and Tom Coster. It is one of Santana's most popular compositions and it reached the top in the Spanish Singles Chart in July 1976.

The 16-bar chord progression follows the Circle of Fifths, similar to the jazz standard "Autumn Leaves". Every other verse ends with a Picardy cadence.

== Genesis ==
Upon seeing a friend suffering a bad experience whilst high on mescaline, Santana composed a piece titled "The Mushroom Lady's Coming to Town". This precursor contained the first lick to "Europa". The piece was put away and not touched for some time.

When Santana was touring with Earth, Wind & Fire in Manchester, England, he played this tune again, this time with Tom Coster who helped him with some of the chords and thus Europa was born. It was renamed as "Europa (Earth's Cry Heaven's Smile)".

Several reports claim that when Carlos Santana visited the Soviet Union in 1987, a controversy arose as some said the Armenian composer Arno Babajanian recognised the first eight measures of Europa, when he first heard it, as his own composition "Мосты" ("Bridges"), released in 1959.

== Other versions ==
One rendition was by saxophonist Gato Barbieri off his 1976 album Caliente! In 2006, saxophonist Jimmy Sommers recorded the song for his Standards album Time Stands Still. Contemporary jazz guitarist Nils released a rendition from his 2009 album Up Close & Personal. Blake Aaron covers the song on his 2015 album Soul Stories.

Another rendition is the one made by Tuck Andress during the 1990s.

Spanish musician Dyango sang in 1990 a version accompanied by Paco de Lucia, with lyrics set to the melody.

Vital Information recorded their version on the 1991 album Vitalive! with Frank Gambale on guitar.

Japanese guitarist Masayoshi Takanaka covered Europa as track 5 on the 1993 album Aquaplanet.

Dutch saxophonist Candy Dulfer covered Europa LIVE at the Q-factory Amsterdam, Sept, 6th 2019.

== Charts ==
Chart (1976)	Peak position
Belgium (Ultratop 50 Wallonia)	32
Italian Singles (Musica e dischi)	2
Netherlands (Single Top 100)	29
Spain (AFE)	1
Switzerland (Schweizer Hitparade)	6
