= Miraculous Supernatural Tour =

2022 concert tour by Santana

- Tour by Santana
- Associated album: Africa Speaks
- Start date: June 17, 2022
- End date: August 27, 2022
- Legs: 1
- No. of shows: 30
- Supporting act: Earth, Wind & Fire

Santana concert chronology
- Miraculous 2020 World Tour (2020); Miraculous Supernatural Tour (2022)

The Miraculous Supernatural Tour is an ongoing concert tour by American Latin rock band Santana. The tour is in support of their twenty-fifth album Africa Speaks (2019), and it consists of concerts in North America. The tour is a continuation of the band's Supernatural Now Tour (2019). The tour was announced in February 2020, with dates being released at the same time. The show is produced by Live Nation Entertainment, and each tour date will be opened by Earth, Wind & Fire. The band is slated to perform songs from their landmark album Supernatural (1999), selections from Africa Speaks, and other hits.

== Background and development ==
On February 25, 2020, Santana announced the Miraculous Supernatural Tour, to support their twenty-fifth album Africa Speaks (2019). Tour dates were released on the same day and tickets were released on February 28, 2020. Live Nation Entertainment was announced as the tour's producers, and each tour date will be opened by Earth, Wind & Fire. The tour is a continuation of their Supernatural Now Tour of 2019, with the band slated to perform songs from their popular album Supernatural (1999), selections from Africa Speaks, and other hits. However, due to the COVID-19 pandemic, the entire tour was postponed twice to 2022. New tour dates were revealed on April 23, 2021.

== Tour dates ==
List of tour dates with date, city, country, venue, references
Date (2022)	City	Country	Venue
June 17 (Note: The show on June 17, 2022 was originally scheduled on June 19, 2020 and June 18, 2021, but it was rescheduled due to the COVID-19 pandemic.)	Chula Vista	United States	North Island Credit Union Amphitheatre
June 18 (Note: The show on June 18, 2022 was originally scheduled on June 20, 2020 and June 19, 2021, but it was rescheduled due to the COVID-19 pandemic.)	Los Angeles	United States	Banc of California Stadium
June 21 (Note: The show on June 21, 2022 was originally scheduled on June 23, 2020 and June 22, 2021, but it was rescheduled due to the COVID-19 pandemic.)	Mountain View	United States	Shoreline Amphitheatre
June 22 (Note: The show on June 22, 2022 was originally scheduled on June 24, 2020 and June 23, 2021, but it was rescheduled due to the COVID-19 pandemic.)	Concord	United States	Concord Pavilion
June 24 (Note: The show on June 24, 2022 was originally scheduled on June 26, 2020 and June 25, 2021, but it was rescheduled due to the COVID-19 pandemic.)	Ridgefield	United States	RV Inn Style Resorts Amphitheater
June 25 (Note: The show on June 25, 2022 was originally scheduled on June 27, 2020 June 26, 2021, but it was rescheduled due to the COVID-19 pandemic.)	Auburn	United States	White River Amphitheatre
June 28 (Note: The show on June 28, 2022 was originally scheduled on June 30, 2020 and June 29, 2021, but it was rescheduled due to the COVID-19 pandemic.)	West Valley City	United States	USANA Amphitheatre
June 29 (Note: The show on June 29, 2022 was originally scheduled on July 1, 2020 and June 30, 2021, but it was rescheduled due to the COVID-19 pandemic.)	Denver	United States	Ball Arena
July 1 (Note: The show on July 1, 2022 was originally scheduled on July 7, 2020 and July 2, 2021, but it was rescheduled due to the COVID-19 pandemic.)	Maryland Heights	United States	Hollywood Casino Amphitheatre
July 2 (Note: The show on July 2, 2022 was originally scheduled on July 11, 2020 and July 3, 2021, but it was rescheduled due to the COVID-19 pandemic.)	Tinley Park	United States	Hollywood Casino Amphitheatre
July 5 (Note: The show on July 5, 2022 was originally scheduled on August 6, 2020 and July 5, 2021, but it was rescheduled due to the COVID-19 pandemic.)	Clarkston	United States	Pine Knob Music Theatre
August 3 (Note: The show on August 3, 2022 was originally scheduled on July 10, 2020, July 9, 2021 and July 8, 2022, but it was rescheduled due to the COVID-19 pandemic then the 2022 date was postponed due to Carlos Santana suffering a medical emergency on July 5, 2022 during the show.)	Noblesville	United States	Ruoff Music Center
August 4 (Note: The show on August 4, 2022 was originally scheduled on August 5, 2020, July 7, 2021 and July 6, 2022, but it was rescheduled due to the COVID-19 pandemic then the 2022 date was postponed due to Carlos Santana suffering a medical emergency on July 5, 2022 during the show.)	Pittsburgh	United States	The Pavilion at Star Lake
August 6 (Note: The show on August 6, 2022 was originally scheduled on August 8, 2020 and August 7, 2021, but it was rescheduled due to the COVID-19 pandemic.)	Hershey	United States	Hersheypark Stadium
August 7 (Note: The show on August 7, 2022 was originally scheduled on August 9, 2020 and August 8, 2021, but it was rescheduled due to the COVID-19 pandemic.)	Toronto	Canada	Budweiser Stage
August 10 (Note: The show on August 10, 2022 was originally scheduled on August 12, 2020 and August 11, 2021, but it was rescheduled due to the COVID-19 pandemic.)	Mansfield	United States	Xfinity Center
August 12 (Note: The show on August 12, 2022 was originally scheduled on August 14, 2020 and August 13, 2021, but it was rescheduled due to the COVID-19 pandemic.)	Uncasville	United States	Mohegan Sun Arena
August 13 (Note: The show on August 13, 2022 was originally scheduled on August 15, 2020 and August 14, 2021, but it was rescheduled due to the COVID-19 pandemic.)	Wantagh	United States	Northwell Health at Jones Beach Theater
August 14 (Note: The show on August 14, 2022 was originally scheduled on August 16, 2020 and August 15, 2021, but it was rescheduled due to the COVID-19 pandemic.)	Holmdel Township	United States	PNC Bank Arts Center
August 17 (Note: The show on August 17, 2022 was originally scheduled on August 19, 2020 and August 18, 2021, but it was rescheduled due to the COVID-19 pandemic.)	Syracuse	United States	St. Joseph's Health Amphitheater at Lakeview
August 18 (Note: The show on August 18, 2022 was originally scheduled on August 20, 2020 and August 19, 2021, but it was rescheduled due to the COVID-19 pandemic.)	Camden	United States	Freedom Mortgage Pavilion
August 20 (Note: The show on August 20, 2022 was originally scheduled on August 22, 2020 and August 21, 2021, but it was rescheduled due to the COVID-19 pandemic.)	Bristow	United States	Jiffy Lube Live
August 21 (Note: The show on August 21, 2022 was originally scheduled on August 23, 2020 and August 22, 2021, but it was rescheduled due to the COVID-19 pandemic.)	Bethel	United States	Bethel Woods Center for the Arts
August 23	Charleston	United States	Credit One Stadium
August 24 (Note: The show on August 24, 2022 was originally scheduled on August 26, 2020 and August 25, 2021, but it was rescheduled due to the COVID-19 pandemic.)	Atlanta	United States	Cellairis Amphitheatre at Lakewood
August 26 (Note: The show on August 26, 2022 was originally scheduled on August 28, 2020 and August 27, 2021, but it was rescheduled due to the COVID-19 pandemic.)	West Palm Beach	United States	iTHINK Financial Amphitheatre
August 27 (Note: The show on August 27, 2022 was originally scheduled on August 29, 2020 and August 28, 2021, but it was rescheduled due to the COVID-19 pandemic.)	Tampa	United States	MidFlorida Credit Union Amphitheatre
May 6, 2023 (Note: The show on May 6, 2023 was originally scheduled on July 3, 2020, July 16, 2021 and July 15, 2022, but it was rescheduled due to the COVID-19 pandemic then the 2022 date was postponed due to Carlos Santana suffering a medical emergency on July 5, 2022 during the show.)	Dallas	United States	Dos Equis Pavilion
May 7, 2023 (Note: The show on May 7, 2023 was originally scheduled on July 5, 2020, July 17, 2021 and July 16, 2022 but it was rescheduled due to the COVID-19 pandemic then the 2022 date was postponed due to Carlos Santana suffering a medical emergency on July 5, 2022 during the show.)	The Woodlands	United States	Cynthia Woods Mitchell Pavilion

=== Canceled tour dates ===
List of tour dates with date, city, country, venue, references
Date (2020 2022)	City	Country	Venue	Reason
August 11	Montreal	Canada	Bell Centre	COVID-19 pandemic
August 25	Nashville	United States	Bridgestone Arena	COVID-19 pandemic
July 9 (Note: The show on July 9, 2022 was originally scheduled on July 8, 2020 and July 10, 2021, but it was rescheduled due to the COVID-19 pandemic.)	Cincinnati	United States	Riverbend Music Center	Cancelled following Carlos Santana passing out on stage on July 5, 2022.
July 10 (Note: The show was originally scheduled on July 12, 2020 and July 11, 2021 before moving to July 10, 2022, but it was rescheduled due to the COVID-19 pandemic.)	Milwaukee	United States	American Family Insurance Amphitheater	Cancelled following Carlos Santana passing out on stage on July 5, 2022.
July 12	Rogers	United States	Walmart Arkansas Music Pavilion	Cancelled following Carlos Santana passing out on stage on July 5, 2022.
