= Miraculous 2020 World Tour =

2020 concert tour by Santana

- Tour by Santana
- Associated album: Africa Speaks
- Start date: March 14, 2020
- End date: April 5, 2020
- Legs: 1
- No. of shows: 14

Santana concert chronology
- Supernatural Now Tour (2019); Miraculous 2020 World Tour (2020); Miraculous Supernatural Tour (2022)

The Miraculous 2020 World Tour was a planned concert tour by American Latin rock band Santana. The tour was scheduled to begin on March 14, 2020, at the Unipol Arena in Bologna, Italy. However, due to the COVID-19 pandemic, the tour was postponed until further notice on March 10, 2020. Michael Vrionis, President of Universal Tone Management, said that Santana will keep fans informed of new tour dates, but over a year later there has been no further announcements.

== Overview ==
The Miraculous 2020 World Tour was mentioned in January 2019, but officially announced on October 28, 2019. The tour will take place Asia, Europe, Oceania, and South America, though only the European dates have been announced as of November 2019. As well as promoting their recent album Africa Speaks, the tour also commemorates the 20th anniversary of their 1999 album Supernatural and the 50th anniversary of their second album, 1970's Abraxas. According to a press release announcing the tour, the tour's set lists will consist of "the new hymns and songs of tomorrow" from Africa Speaks.

== Tour band ==
- Ray Greene – lead vocals
- Andy Vargas – lead vocals
- Carlos Santana – lead guitar, percussion, vocals
- Tommy Anthony – rhythm guitar, vocals
- David K. Mathews – keyboards
- Benny Rietveld – bass guitar
- Cindy Blackman Santana – drums
- Paoli Mejías – percussion
- Karl Perazzo – timbales, percussion, vocals

== Tour dates ==
List of postponed concerts, showing date, city, country, venue
Date (2020)	City	Country	Venue
March 14	Zürich	Switzerland	Hallenstadion
March 17	Kraków	Poland	Tauron Arena
March 19	Budapest	Hungary	László Papp Budapest Sports Arena
March 20	Vienna	Austria	Wiener Stadthalle
March 22	Munich	Germany	Olympiahalle
March 23	Cologne	Germany	Lanxess Arena
March 24	Antwerp	Belgium	Sportpaleis
March 26	Glasgow	Scotland	SSE Hydro
March 27	London	England	The O2 Arena
March 29	Dublin	Ireland	3Arena
March 31	Amsterdam	Netherlands	Ziggo Dome
April 2	Oslo	Norway	Oslo Spektrum
April 3	Stockholm	Sweden	Ericsson Globe
April 5	Helsinki	Finland	Hartwall Arena
