= Jéssica Cediel =

Colombian model and presenter (born 1980)

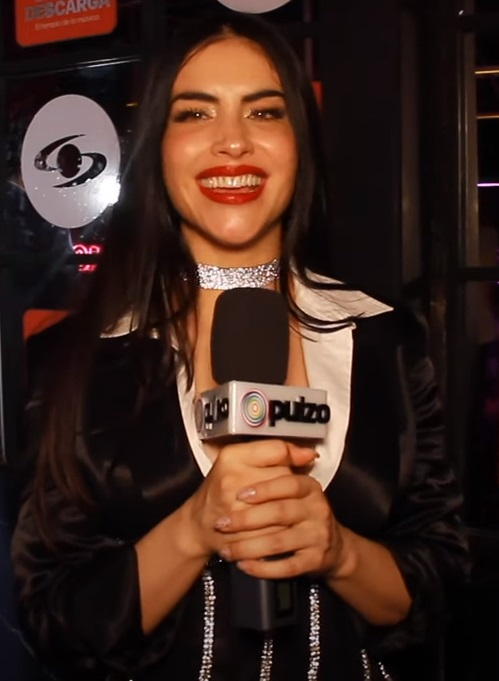
- At the launch of La descarga in 2022
- Born: Jéssica Eliana Cediel Silva; 4 April 1980 (age 46); Bogotá, Colombia
- Education: University of La Sabana
- Occupations: Actress, journalist, model, presenter
- Website: www.jcediel.com/en/

Jéssica Eliana Cediel Silva (born 4 April 1982) is a Colombian actress, journalist, model, and television presenter, best known for hosting the programs Muy buenos días, Estilo RCN, and Yo me llamo.

== Biography ==
Jéssica Cediel was born in Bogotá on 4 April 1982. She studied social communication and journalism at the University of La Sabana. In 2002, before finishing her studies, she competed in the Miss Bogotá contest, which elects the city's representative to the National Beauty Pageant. She finished second, being named viceroy of the capital. Her participation opened doors for her to work on Colombian television.

Her media career began as an advertising model for television commercials and magazines. Her first appearance as a television presenter was on the Citytv program Bravissimo, in its Bogotaneando segment.

In July 2007, Cediel joined Canal RCN as presenter of the program Muy buenos días, which was hosted by Laura Acuña, Jota Mario Valencia, Milena López, and Adriana Betancur.

In March 2011, she left Muy buenos días to present Nuestra semana, nuestra tele, an entertainment program, alongside comedian Alejandro Riaño. She was also part of the group of model-presenters for Estilo RCN. In November, it was reported that Cediel suffered from health problems due to a cosmetic procedure. In March 2012, she initiated legal action against the surgeon and requested compensation of 400 million pesos (US$222,606), but the suit failed and the surgeon was acquitted.

In 2012, she received the TVyNovelas Award for Best Entertainment Presenter for her work on Nuestra semana, nuestra tele.

In June 2014, Cediel settled in Miami, to be part of the Univision program El Gordo y la Flaca, as an entertainment presenter. She also worked for Sal y Pimienta, on the same network.

In 2020, she provided coverage of the Tokyo Summer Olympics for Telemundo.

== Filmography ==
=== Television programs ===
Year	Title	Role	Channel
2002–2007	Bravissimo	Presenter	Citytv
2007–2011	Muy buenos días	Presenter	Canal RCN
2011–2014	Estilo RCN	Presenter	Canal RCN
2012–2014	Nuestra semana, nuestra tele	Presenter	Canal RCN
2014–2015	El Gordo y la Flaca	Presenter	Univision
2015–2017	Sal y Pimienta	Presenter	Univision
2016–2017	Premios Juventud	Presenter	Univision
2017	Yo me llamo 5th season	Presenter	Caracol Televisión
2018	La vuelta a Rusia en 80 risas	Guest	Caracol Televisión
2018	Viva el Mundial y Más	Presenter	Telemundo
2018	Exatlón Estados Unidos	Digital reporter	Telemundo
2019	La Voz	Presenter	Telemundo
2019	La vuelta al mundo en 80 risas 2nd season	Participant	Caracol Televisión
2020–2021	Bingos Felices – Sábados Felices	Presenter	Caracol Televisión
2021	Pulsarmanía	Presenter	Caracol Televisión
2021	2020 Summer Olympics	Reporter	Telemundo
2022–2023	La descarga	Presenter	Caracol Televisión

=== Television series ===
Year	Title	Channel
2006	Hasta que la plata nos separe	Canal RCN
2012	Historias clasificadas	Canal RCN
2014	Graduados	Canal RCN
2019	Betty en NY	Telemundo
2023	Vuelve a mí	Telemundo

=== Films ===
Year	Title	Character
2014	Todas para uno	María
2017	Condorito: la película	Yayita
2017	Una comedia macabra	Lamia
2017	Nadie sabe para quién trabaja	Antonia
2021	Lokillo en: Mi otra yo	Liliana Navarro
2021	No me echen ese muerto	Martina
2023	Amar es madurar	Elizabeth

== Awards and nominations ==
Year	Award	Category	Medium/program	Result
2012	TVyNovelas Awards	Best Entertainment Presenter	Nuestra semana, nuestra tele	Winner
2014	Kids' Choice Awards	Favorite Personality	Twitter	Nominee
2014	TVyNovelas Awards	Best Entertainment Presenter	Nuestra semana, nuestra tele	Nominee
2014	TVyNovelas Awards	Best Entertainment Presenter	Estilo RCN	Nominee
