= Supernatural Now Tour =

2019 concert tour by Santana

- Tour by Santana
- Associated album: Africa Speaks
- Start date: June 20, 2019
- End date: November 12, 2019
- Legs: 3
- No. of shows: 33

Santana concert chronology
- Global Consciousness Tour (2019); Supernatural Now Tour (2019); Miraculous 2020 World Tour (2020)

The Supernatural Now Tour was a concert tour by American rock band Santana, commemorating the 20th anniversary of their pivotal 1999 album Supernatural and their appearance at the Woodstock festival in 1969. The tour also supports their most recent album, Africa Speaks.

== Overview ==
The Supernatural Now Tour consisted of 33 performances across the United States and Canada. The tour was announced on January 16, 2019, and each show was opened by the Doobie Brothers (with the exception of the final show). During the tour, the group headlined Bethel, New York's half-centennial celebration of Woodstock at Bethel Woods Center for the Arts in August 2019.

== Tour band ==
- Ray Greene – lead vocals
- Andy Vargas – lead vocals
- Carlos Santana – lead guitar, percussion, vocals
- Tommy Anthony – rhythm guitar, vocals
- David K. Mathews – keyboards
- Benny Rietveld – bass guitar
- Cindy Blackman Santana – drums
- Paoli Mejías – percussion
- Karl Perazzo – timbales, percussion, vocals

== Set list ==
An average set list of this tour is as follows:

1. "Soul Sacrifice" (Carlos Santana, Gregg Rolie, David Brown, Marcus Malone)
2. "Jin-go-lo-ba" (Babatunde Olatunji)
3. "Evil Ways" (Clarence "Sonny" Henry)
4. "A Love Supreme" (John Coltrane)
5. "(Da Le) Yaleo" (Santana, Shakara Mutela, Christian Polloni)
6. "Put Your Lights On" (Erik Schrody)
7. "Hope You're Feeling Better" (Rolie)
8. "Black Magic Woman" (Peter Green)
9. "Gypsy Queen" (Gábor Szabó)
10. "Oye Como Va" (Tito Puente)
11. "Love of My Life" (Santana, Dave Matthews)
12. "Breaking Down the Door" (Santana, Manu Chao, Concha Buika, Drew Gonsalves, Ivan Duran, Rafael de Leon)
13. "The Game of Love" (Gregg Alexander, Rick Nowels)
14. "The Calling" (Santana, Chester D. Thompson, Freddie Stone, Linda Graham)
15. "Maria Maria" (Santana, Karl Perazzo, Raul Rekow, Wyclef Jean, Jerry Duplessis)
16. "Foo Foo" (Yvon André, Roger Eugène, Yves Joseph, Hermann Nau, Claude Jean)
17. "Corazón Espinado" (Fher Olvera)
18. "Toussaint L'Overture" (José Areas, Brown, Michael Carabello, Rolie, Michael Shrieve, Santana)

Encore

19. "Are You Ready" (Joe Chambers)
20. "Smooth" (Itaal Shur, Rob Thomas)
21. "Love, Peace And Happiness" (The Chambers Brothers)

== Tour dates ==
List of concerts, showing date, city, country, venue, opening acts
Date (2019)	City	Country	Venue	Support act(s)
June 20	Irvine	United States	FivePoint Amphitheatre	The Doobie Brothers
June 22	Phoenix	United States	Ak-Chin Pavilion	The Doobie Brothers
June 23	Chula Vista	United States	North Island Credit Union Amphitheatre	The Doobie Brothers
June 24	Los Angeles	United States	Hollywood Bowl	The Doobie Brothers
June 26	Mountain View	United States	Shoreline Amphitheatre	The Doobie Brothers
June 27	Wheatland	United States	Toyota Amphitheatre	The Doobie Brothers
June 29	Auburn	United States	White River Amphitheatre	The Doobie Brothers
June 30	Ridgefield	United States	Sunlight Supply Amphitheater	The Doobie Brothers
July 2	West Valley City	United States	USANA Amphitheatre	The Doobie Brothers
July 3	Denver	United States	Pepsi Center	The Doobie Brothers
July 6	Dallas	United States	Dos Equis Pavilion	The Doobie Brothers
July 7	The Woodlands	United States	Cynthia Woods Mitchell Pavilion	The Doobie Brothers
July 9	Austin	United States	Austin360 Amphitheater	The Doobie Brothers
July 11	Kansas City	United States	Sprint Center	The Doobie Brothers
July 12	Maryland Heights	United States	Hollywood Casino Amphitheatre	The Doobie Brothers
August 3	Saint Paul	United States	Xcel Energy Center	The Doobie Brothers
August 4	Tinley Park	United States	Hollywood Casino Amphitheatre	The Doobie Brothers
August 6	Toronto	Canada	Budweiser Stage	The Doobie Brothers
August 7	Cuyahoga Falls	United States	Blossom Music Center	The Doobie Brothers
August 9	Noblesville	United States	Ruoff Home Mortgage Music Center	The Doobie Brothers
August 10	Cincinnati	United States	J. Ralph Corbett Pavilion	The Doobie Brothers
August 11	Clarkston	United States	DTE Energy Music Theatre	The Doobie Brothers
August 13	Charlotte	United States	PNC Music Pavilion	The Doobie Brothers
August 14	Bristow	United States	Jiffy Lube Live	The Doobie Brothers
August 16	Darien Center	United States	Darien Lake Performing Arts Center	The Doobie Brothers
August 17	Bethel	United States	Bethel Woods Center for the Arts	The Doobie Brothers
August 18	Holmdel Township	United States	PNC Bank Arts Center	The Doobie Brothers
August 20	Mansfield	United States	Xfinity Center	The Doobie Brothers
August 21	Hartford	United States	Xfinity Theatre	The Doobie Brothers
August 23	Saratoga Springs	United States	Saratoga Performing Arts Center	The Doobie Brothers
August 24	Camden	United States	BB&T Pavilion	The Doobie Brothers
August 25	Wantagh	United States	Northwell Health at Jones Beach Theater	The Doobie Brothers
November 12	San Francisco	United States	Chase Center	War
