= La Voz (American TV series) season 1 =

La Voz
- Season 1
- Hosted by: Jorge Bernal; Jacqueline Bracamontes
- Coaches: Wisin; Alejandra Guzmán; Luis Fonsi; Carlos Vives
- Winner: Jeidimar Rijos
- Winning coach: Luis Fonsi
- Runner-up: Mayré Martínez

Release
- Original network: Telemundo
- Original release: January 13 – April 21, 2019

Season chronology
- Next → Season 2

The first season of La Voz premiered on January 13th, 2019, on Telemundo. First season coaches were Luis Fonsi, Carlos Vives, Alejandra Guzmán and Wisin. The show was hosted by Jorge Bernal, Jacqueline Bracamontes and Jéssica Cediel backstage.

On Sunday, April 21sr, 2019, Jeidimar Rijos was crowned the winner of La Voz US season one, alongside her coach, Luis Fonsi. She received a US$100,000 cash Oroz and an Universal Music Group récord deal

== Coaches ==
La Voz U.S season 1 coaches

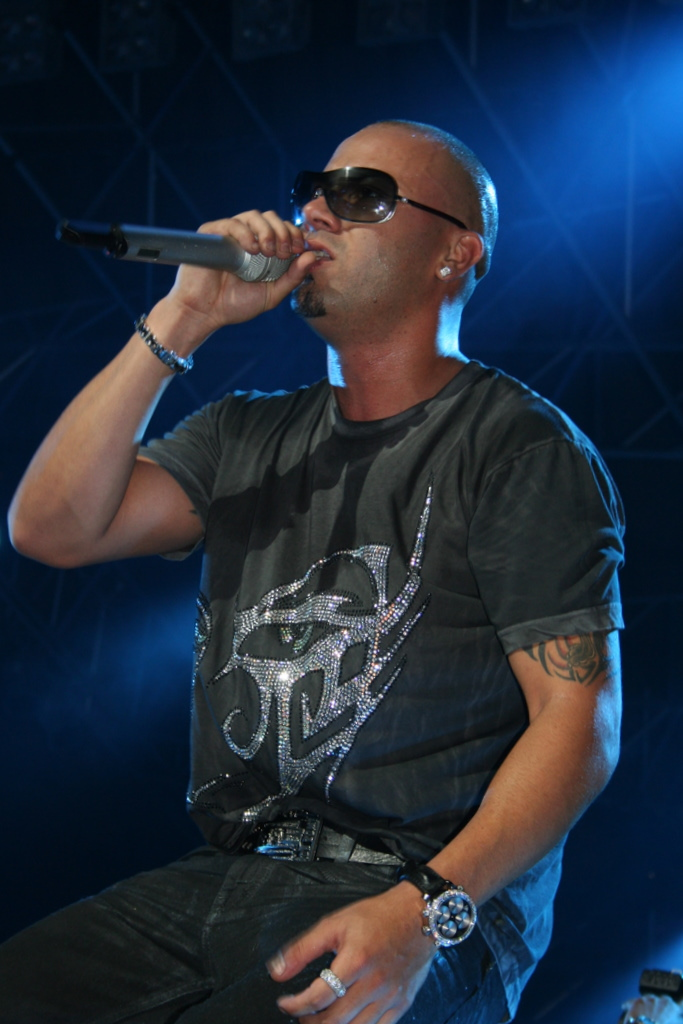
Wisin

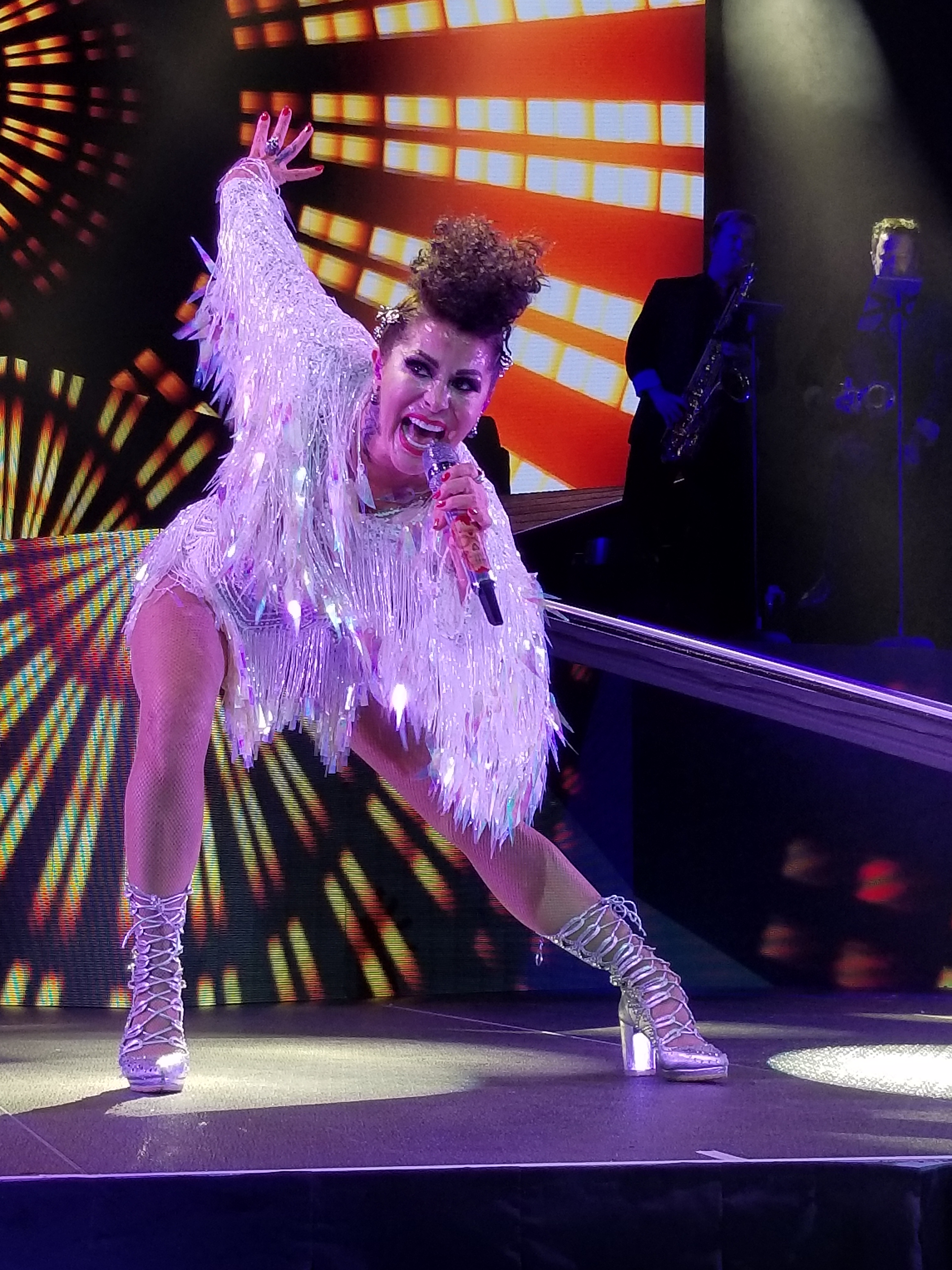
Alejandra Guzmán

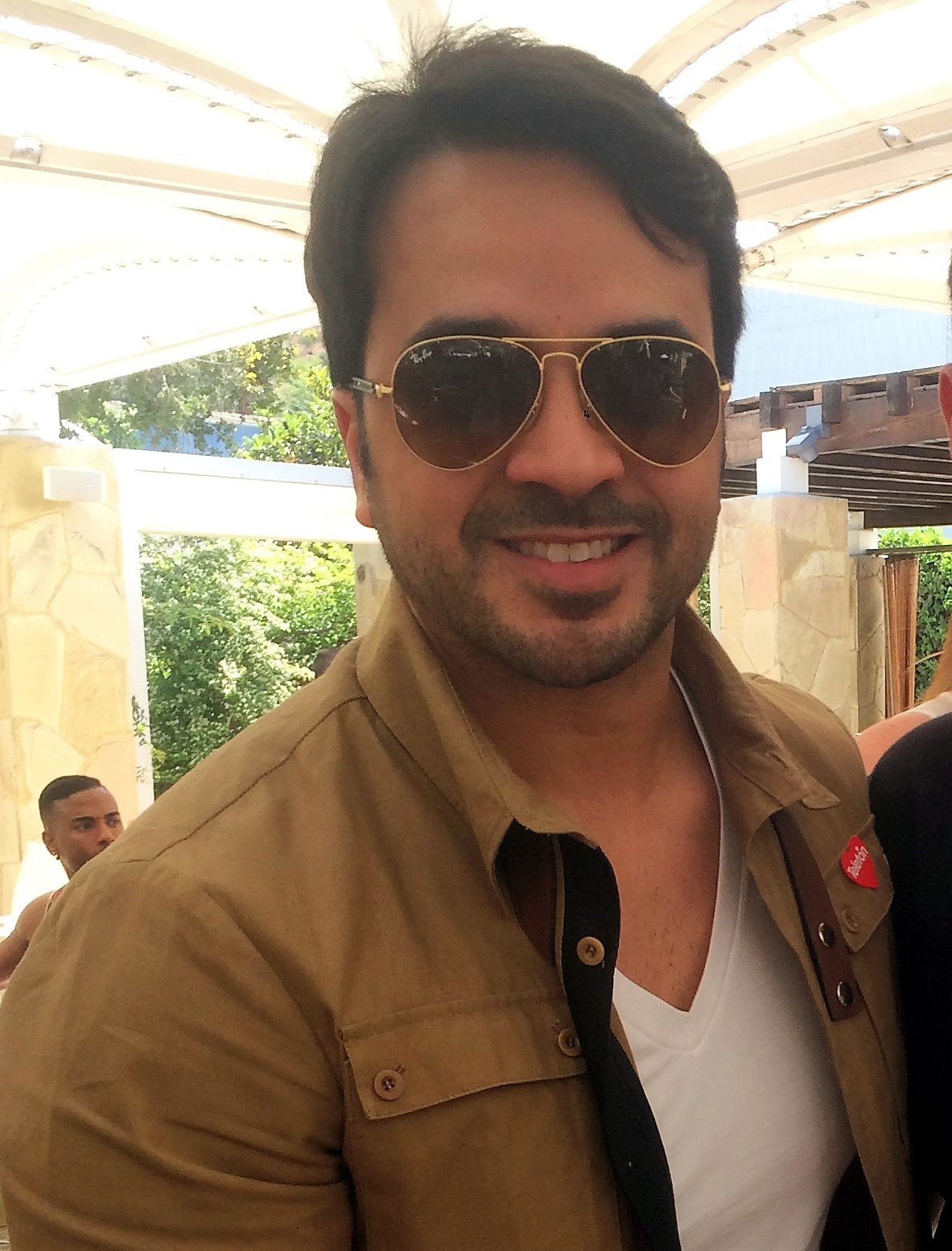
Luis Fonsi

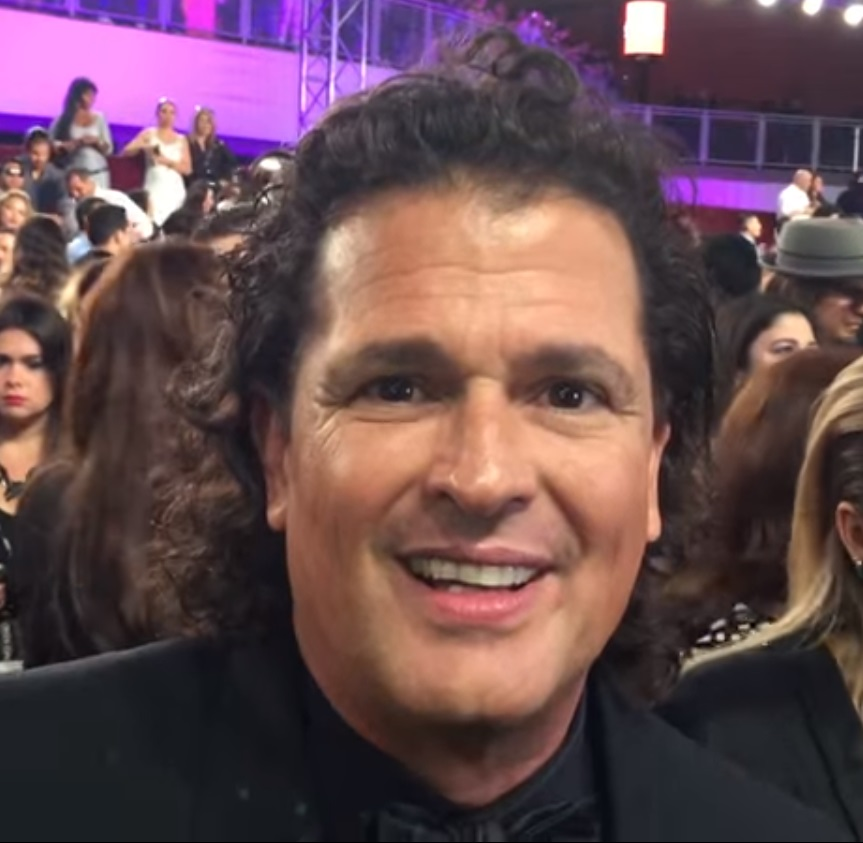
Carlos Vives

On May 10th, 2018, along with the announcement of the show, it was confirmed that Luis Fonsi would be a coach on La Voz. On July 5th, 2018, Telemundo announced that Alejandra Guzmán has also joined the show as a coach, followed by Wisin on July 12. On September 13th, 2018, it was confirmed that Carlos Vives would be joining the show as the fourth and final coach.

Jorge Bernal, former host of Telemundo's La Voz Kids, and Jéssica Cediel were paired as hosts for the first season. Jacqueline Bracamontes, former host of La Voz ... México, joined them at the Battles.

This is the first season in The Voice franchise that all four coaches have previous experience in the same role before joining the panel, with Wisin and Guzmán both having coached participants in the third season of La Voz... México, Vives was on the Mexican and the Colombian version, and Fonsi was on the Chilean version and the Spanish version of the show.

Some of the advisors for the Battle round are: Prince Royce for Team Wisin, Becky G for Team Guzmán, Christian Nodal for Team Fonsi, and Carlos Rivera for Team Vives.

== Teams ==
Color key

- Winner
- Runner-up
- Third place
- Fourth place
- Eliminated in the Finale
- Eliminated in the Live Shows
- Stolen in the Battles
- Eliminated in the Battles

Coaches	Top 48 artists				
Wisin					
Wisin	Mayré Martínez	Ronny Mercedes	Yashira Rodriguez	Frances Dueñas	Johnny Bliss
Wisin	Yalilenys Pérez	Brisila Barros	Stephanie Amaro	~~Elahim David~~	Lia La Vecchia
Wisin	Alpha Sarai	María Karla Urra	Omar Carrasco	Marco Uribe	
Alejandra Guzmán					
Alejandra Guzmán	Dunia Ojeda	Ruben Sandoval	Kari Santoyo	Genesis Diaz	Adrianna Foster
Alejandra Guzmán	Deanette Rivas	Verónica Rodríguez	Elvin Ramos	~~Francisco Gónzalez~~	~~Abel Flores~~
Alejandra Guzmán	~~Sheniel Maisonet~~	Lizz King	Ivonne Acero	Jonathan Martinez	
Luis Fonsi					
Luis Fonsi	Jeidimar Rijos	Jerry Montañez	Abdiel Pacheco	Katherine Lopez	Raymundo Monge Jr.
Luis Fonsi	Ediberto Carmenatty	Elahim David	Francisco Gónzalez	~~Deanette Rivas~~	~~Mayré Martínez~~
Luis Fonsi	~~Yashira Rodriguez~~	Neenah Cintron	Orlando Iturriaga	Mari Burelle	
Carlos Vives					
Carlos Vives	Mava Gonzalez	Abel Flores	Sheniel Maisonet	Lluvia Vega	Yireh Pizarro
Carlos Vives	Paola Lebron	Ana Senko	Manny Cabo	~~Ruben Sandoval~~	Kemily Corrales
Carlos Vives	Pablo Arami	Ricardo Malfatti	Juan Quiñones	Juan Jay Rico	
Note: Italicized names are stolen artists (names struck through within former teams).

== Blind Auditions ==
In the Blind Auditions, the four coaches had to form their own teams, each of which would consist of 12 contestants. Each coach had one Block to prevent one of the other coaches from getting a contestant.

NOTE: In order to be consistent with the summaries provided by the franchise, the "Quiro Tu Voz" button is referred by its global name, "I Want You".

Color key

✔	Coach pressed "I WANT YOU" button
	Artist defaulted to a coach's team
	Artist elected a coach's team
	Artist eliminated with no coach pressing his or her "I WANT YOU" button
✘	Coach pressed "I WANT YOU" button, but was blocked by another coach from getting the artist
	Blocked by Wisin; Blocked by Guzmán; Blocked by Fonsi; Blocked by Vives

=== Episode 1 (January 13) ===
Order	Artist	Age	Hometown	Song	Coach's and artist's choices			
Order	Artist	Age	Hometown	Song	Wisin	Guzmán	Fonsi	Vives
1	Mayré Martínez	40	Redondo Beach, California	"Mi Gente"	✔	✔	✔	✔
2	Ruben Sandoval	21	Baldwin Park, California	"Renunciacion"	✔	✔	✔	✔
3	Genesis Diaz	20	Miami, Florida	"It's a Man's World"	✔	✔	—	✔
4	Emi Antoino	35	Bergenfield, New Jersey	"Vuelve"	—	—	—	—
5	Katherine Lopez	18	Miami, Florida	"Rise Up"	✔	✔	✔	✔
6	Yireh Pizarro	23	Vega Baja, Puerto Rico	"Tan Fácil"	✔	—	—	✔
7	Jexi	18	Perris, California	"Tu Falta De Querer"	—	—	—	—
8	Yalilenys Pérez	18	Miami, Florida	"God Is a Woman"	✔	✔	✘	✔
9	Jerry Montañez	42	West Palm Beach, Florida	"Te Conozco Bien"	✔	✔	✔	✔

=== Episode 2 (January 20) ===
Order	Artist	Age	Hometown	Song	Coach's and artist's choices			
Order	Artist	Age	Hometown	Song	Wisin	Guzmán	Fonsi	Vives
1	Ronny Mercedes	32	The Bronx, New York	"Lágrimas"	✔	—	✔	✔
2	Adrián Torres	18	Dallas, Texas	"Recuérdame"	—	—	—	—
3	Alpha Sarai	22	Toa Baja, Puerto Rico	"Quisiera Alejarme"	✔	—	—	✔
4	Francisco Gónzalez	24	Las Vegas, Nevada	"Somos Novios"	—	✔	— (Note: Guzmán blocked Fonsi but Fonsi didn’t press his button.)	—
5	Rassel Marcano	30	Orlando, Florida	"Mayores"	—	—	—	—
6	Raymundo Monge Jr.	31	South El Monte, California	"Let it Go"	✔	✔	✔	✔
7	Jay Rico	23	Philadelphia, Pennsylvania	"Sigo Extranandote"	—	—	—	✔
8	Jose Rico	—N/a	—N/a	"Solamenta Tú"	—	—	—	—
9	Lluvia Vega	30	Dallas, Texas	"Volver, Volver"	✔	✔	—	✔
10	Jeidimar Rijos	18	Dorado, Puerto Rico	"This Is Me"	✔	✔	✔	✔
11	Lizz King	38	Santurce, Puerto Rico	"Soy Peor"	✔	✔	—	✔

=== Episode 3 (January 27) ===
Order	Artist	Age	Hometown	Song	Coach's and artist's choices			
Order	Artist	Age	Hometown	Song	Wisin	Guzmán	Fonsi	Vives
1	Kari Santoyo	23	Chicago, Illinois	"Coraźon Partío"	✔	✔	✔	✔
2	Orlando Iturriaga	30	Hicksville, New York	"Chan, Chan"	—	✔	✔	—
3	Marco Uribe	23	San Antonio, Texas	"Sugar"	✔	✔	✔	✔
4	Edixio Mora	24	Richmond, Virginia	"Imaginame Sin Ti	—	—	—	—
5	Ana Senko	21	San Antonio, Texas	"Back to You"	✔	—	—	✔
6	Paola Lebrón	20	Carolina, Puerto Rico	"Duele el Corazón"	✔	✔	✔	✔
7	Elahim David	28	Miami, Florida	"Me niego"	✔	—	—	✔
8	Abel Flores	27	Los Angeles, California	"Ain't No Sunshine"	—	✔	—	✔
9	Joe Mun	29	Los Angeles, California	"Si No Te Hubieras Ido"	—	—	—	—
10	Neenah Cintron	19	Weston, Florida	"Chandelier"	✔	✘	✔	✔

=== Episode 4 (February 3) ===
Order	Artist	Age	Hometown	Song	Coach's and artist's choices			
Order	Artist	Age	Hometown	Song	Wisin	Guzmán	Fonsi	Vives
1	Stephanie Amaro	38	Whittier, California	"La Llorona"	✔	✔	—	✔
2	Jonathan Martinez	—N/a	—N/a	"Pa Dentro"	—	✔	—	—
3	Kemily Corrales	19	Hialeah, Florida	"Issues"	✔	✔	—	✔
4	Albin St. Rose	31	Washington, D.C.	"Si No Vuelves"	—	—	—	—
5	Lia La Vecchia	—N/a	—N/a	"Like I'm Gonna Lose You"	✔	—	—	—
6	Deanette Rivas	27	Miami, Florida	"Víveme"	✔	✔	✔	✔
7	Ricardo Malfatti	46	Doral, Florida	"Contigo Aprendí"	—	—	—	✔
8	Adrianna Foster	32	Doral, Florida	"Try"	✔	✔	✘	✔
9	Osvian Ruiz	27	Arecibo, Puerto Rico	"Cenizas"	—	—	—	—
10	Maria Karla Urra	23	Miami, Florida	"Quizás, Quizás, Quizás"	✔	—	—	✔
11	Matthews Charlotten	21	Ponce, Puerto Rico	"Can't Feel My Face"	—	—	—	—
12	Johnny Bliss	26	New York City, New York	"Flor Pálida"	✔	✔	—	✔

=== Episode 5 (February 10) ===
Order	Artist	Age	Hometown	Song	Coach's and artist's choices			
Order	Artist	Age	Hometown	Song	Wisin	Guzmán	Fonsi	Vives
1	Juan Quiñones	40	—N/a	"Como Fue"	—	—	—	✔
2	Ivonne Acero	21	Aguila, Arizona	"Mercy"	✔	✔	✔	✔
3	Omar Carrasco	25	San Antonio, Texas	"Perfect"	✔	—	—	—
4	Dailyn Otano	18	—N/a	"Díganle"	—	—	—	—
5	Mari Burelle	33	Franklin, Tennessee	"Bang Bang"	✔	✘	✔	✔
6	Elvin Ramos	23	Loiza, Puerto Rico	"Amigos Con Derecho"	—	✔	—	—
7	Yashira Rodríguez	22	Ponce, Puerto Rico	"Hold Back the River"	✔	—	✔	✔
8	Cindel Salcedo	26	—N/a	"Volverte A Amar"	—	—	—	—
9	Mava González	18	Coral Springs, Florida	"Stone Cold"	✔	✔	—	✔
10	Brisila Barros	20	Chicago, Illinois	"All About That Bass"	✔	—	—	✔
11	Pabol Arami	22	Puerto Rico	"Kilómetros"	—	—	—	✔

=== Episode 6 (February 17) ===
Order	Artist	Age	Hometown	Song	Coach's and artist's choices			
Order	Artist	Age	Hometown	Song	Wisin	Guzmán	Fonsi	Vives
1	Ediberto Camenatty	31	Sabana Grande, Puerto Rico	"Obsesionnado"	✔	—	✔	✔
2	Sheniel Maisonet	22	Boston, Massachusetts	"Si Una Vez"	✔	✔	—	—
3	Alexis Flores	25	San Antonio, Texas	"At Last"	—	—	—	—
4	Verónica Rodríguez	19	Mayagüez, Puerto Rico	"1, 2, 3"	✔	✔	—	—
5	Abdiel Pacheco	27	Humacao, Puerto Rico	"El Farsante"	✔	✔	✔	✔
6	Dunia Ojeda	27	Miami, Florida	"Me Soltaste"	✔	✔	Team full	✔
7	Manny Cabo	48	Elizabeth, New Jersey	"Believer"	✔	Team full	Team full	✔
8	Ernesto Cabrera	26	Miami, Florida	"Pero Te Extraño"	—	Team full	Team full	Team full
9	Frances Dueñas	24	Los Angeles, California	"Adiós Amor"	✔	Team full	Team full	Team full

== The Battles ==
The Battle Rounds started on February 24th. Season one advisors included: Prince Royce for Team Wisin, Becky G for Team Guzmán, Christian Nodal for Team Fonsi, and Carlos Rivera for Team Vives. The coaches could steal two losing artists from other coaches. Contestants who won their battle or were stolen by another coach advanced to the Live Shows.

Color key:

Artist won the Battle and advanced to the Live Playoffs
Artist lost the Battle but was stolen by another coach and advanced to the Live Playoffs
Artist lost the Battle and was eliminated

Episode	Coach	Order	Winner	Song	Loser	'Steal' result			
Episode	Coach	Order	Winner	Song	Loser	Wisin	Guzmán	Fonsi	Vives
Episode 7 (Sunday, February 24, 2019)	Luis Fonsi	1	Abdiel Pacheco	"Perro Fiel"	Mayré Martínez	✔	✔	—N/a	✔
Episode 7 (Sunday, February 24, 2019)	Wisin	2	Frances Dueñas	"Pienso En Ti"	Omar Carrasco	—N/a	—	—	—
Episode 7 (Sunday, February 24, 2019)	Carlos Vives	3	Lluvia Vega	"Amanecí en tu Brazos"	Ruben Sandoval	—	✔	✔	—N/a
Episode 7 (Sunday, February 24, 2019)	Alejandra Guzmán	4	Elvin Ramos	"Vaina Loca"	Ivonne Acero	—	—N/a	—	—
Episode 7 (Sunday, February 24, 2019)	Luis Fonsi	5	Jerry Montañez	"Valió la Pena"	Orlando Iturriaga	—	—	—N/a	—
Episode 8 (Sunday, March 3, 2019)	Alejandra Guzmán	1	Adrianna Foster	"Stay"	Abel Flores	—	—N/a	✔	✔
Episode 8 (Sunday, March 3, 2019)	Luis Fonsi	2	Ediberto Carmenatty	"Y Tú Te Vas"	Neenah Cintron	—	—	—N/a	—
Episode 8 (Sunday, March 3, 2019)	Alejandra Guzmán	3	Genesis Diaz	"Something Just like This"	Sheniel Maisonet	—	—N/a	—	✔
Episode 8 (Sunday, March 3, 2019)	Carlos Vives	4	Manny Cabo	"Historia de un Amor"	Juan Quiñones	—	—	—	Team full
Episode 8 (Sunday, March 3, 2019)	Wisin	5	Johnny Bliss	"Vivir lo Nuestro"	María Karla Urra	—N/a	—	—	Team full
Episode 9 (Sunday, March 10, 2019)	Wisin	1	Ronny Mercedes	"Loco"	Alpha Sarai	—N/a	—	—	Team full
Episode 9 (Sunday, March 10, 2019)	Carlos Vives	2	Yireh Pizarro	"Fuiste Tú"	Ricardo Malfatti	—	—	—	Team full
Episode 9 (Sunday, March 10, 2019)	Luis Fonsi	3	Raymundo Monge Jr.	"My Only One"	Yashira Rodriguez	✔	—	—N/a	Team full
Episode 9 (Sunday, March 10, 2019)	Alejandra Guzmán	4	Verónica Rodríguez	"Feeling Good"	Lizz King	Team full	—N/a	—	Team full
Episode 9 (Sunday, March 10, 2019)	Carlos Vives	5	Paola Lebron	"3 AM"	Pablo Arami	Team full	—	—	Team full
Episode 10 (Sunday, March 17, 2019)	Wisin	1	Stephanie Amaro	"Contigo en la Distancia"	Elahim David	Team full	—	✔	Team full
Episode 10 (Sunday, March 17, 2019)	Luis Fonsi	2	Katherine Lopez	"Rolling in the Deep"	Deanette Rivas	Team full	✔	—N/a	Team full
Episode 10 (Sunday, March 17, 2019)	Alejandra Guzmán	3	Kari Santoyo	"Tú Recuerdo"	Jonathan Martinez	Team full	Team full	—	Team full
Episode 10 (Sunday, March 17, 2019)	Carlos Vives	4	Mava Gonzalez	"Confident"	Kemily Corrales	Team full	Team full	—	Team full
Episode 10 (Sunday, March 17, 2019)	Wisin	5	Yalilenys Pérez	"Me Enamoré"	Lia La Vecchia	Team full	Team full	—	Team full
Episode 11 (Sunday, March 24, 2019)
Episode 11 (Sunday, March 24, 2019)	Alejandra Guzmán	1	Dunia Ojeda	"Hoy Tengo Ganas de Ti"	Francisco Gónzalez	Team full	Team full	✔	Team full
Episode 11 (Sunday, March 24, 2019)	Wisin	2	Brisila Barros	"Shape of You"	Marco Uribe	Team full	Team full	Team full	Team full
Episode 11 (Sunday, March 24, 2019)	Luis Fonsi	3	Jeidimar Rijos	"Dangerous Woman"	Mari Burelle	Team full	Team full	Team full	Team full
Episode 11 (Sunday, March 24, 2019)	Carlos Vives	4	Ana Senko	"Mi Verdad"	Juan Jay Rico	Team full	Team full	Team full	Team full

== Live Shows ==
The Live Shows started on March 31st. They featured two nights of Live Playoffs, the Semifinal and Finale. The airing schedule was changed to 8:30PM / 7:30 PM Central Time (CT) only for this phase of the show, and only in this season.

Color key:

Artist was saved by the Public's votes
Artist was saved by his/her coach or was placed in the bottom two, bottom three, or middle three
Artist was eliminated

=== Week 1 & 2: Live Playoffs (March 31 & April 7) ===
The Live Playoffs comprised episodes 12 and 13. The top thirty-two artists performed. Two artists from each team advanced to the next stage based on the viewers' vote, and each coach made their own choice for completing their respective teams. The first night (Sunday, March 31) featured two teams' performances, whereas the second night (Sunday, April 7) featured the other two teams, along with the results of the first two teams.

Episode	Coach	Order	Artist	Song	Result
Episode 12 (Sunday, March 31, 2019)	Luis Fonsi	1	Abdiel Pacheco	"Mía"	Fonsi's choice
Episode 12 (Sunday, March 31, 2019)	Alejandra Guzmán	2	Ruben Sandoval	"La Media Vuelta"	Public's vote
Episode 12 (Sunday, March 31, 2019)	Alejandra Guzmán	3	Deanette Rivas	"What About Us"	Eliminated
Episode 12 (Sunday, March 31, 2019)	Luis Fonsi	4	Ediberto Carmenatty	"La Incondicional"	Eliminated
Episode 12 (Sunday, March 31, 2019)	Alejandra Guzmán	5	Genesis Diaz	"Amores Extraños"	Guzmán's choice
Episode 12 (Sunday, March 31, 2019)	Luis Fonsi	6	Raymundo Monge Jr.	"Que Lloro"	Eliminated
Episode 12 (Sunday, March 31, 2019)	Alejandra Guzmán	7	Verónica Rodríguez	"Créeme"	Eliminated
Episode 12 (Sunday, March 31, 2019)	Luis Fonsi	8	Elahim David	"Dónde está el Amor"	Eliminated
Episode 12 (Sunday, March 31, 2019)	Alejandra Guzmán	9	Dunia Ojeda	"Ahora Quien"	Public's vote
Episode 12 (Sunday, March 31, 2019)	Luis Fonsi	10	Katherine Lopez	"En Cambio No"	Fonsi's choice
Episode 12 (Sunday, March 31, 2019)	Alejandra Guzmán	11	Elvin Ramos	"Calma"	Eliminated
Episode 12 (Sunday, March 31, 2019)	Luis Fonsi	12	Francisco González	"Perdóname"	Eliminated
Episode 12 (Sunday, March 31, 2019)	Alejandra Guzmán	13	Adrianna Foster	"Aléjate de mí"	Eliminated
Episode 12 (Sunday, March 31, 2019)	Luis Fonsi	14	Jeidimar Rijos	"Recuérdame"	Public's vote
Episode 12 (Sunday, March 31, 2019)	Alejandra Guzmán	15	Kari Santoyo	"La Tortura"	Guzmán's choice
Episode 12 (Sunday, March 31, 2019)	Luis Fonsi	16	Jerry Montañez	"Mi Libertad"	Public's vote
Episode 13 (Sunday, April 7, 2019)	Carlos Vives	1	Lluvia Vega	"El crucifijo de piedra"	Vives's choice
Episode 13 (Sunday, April 7, 2019)	Wisin	2	Ronny Mercedes	"Volver a Amar"	Public's vote
Episode 13 (Sunday, April 7, 2019)	Carlos Vives	3	Paola Lebron	"Arroyito"	Eliminated
Episode 13 (Sunday, April 7, 2019)	Carlos Vives	4	Ana Senko	"Faded"	Eliminated
Episode 13 (Sunday, April 7, 2019)	Wisin	5	Yailenis Perez	"El Préstamo"	Eliminated
Episode 13 (Sunday, April 7, 2019)	Carlos Vives	6	Yireh Pizarro	"Fotografía"	Eliminated
Episode 13 (Sunday, April 7, 2019)	Wisin	7	Stephanie Amaro	"El día que me quieras"	Eliminated
Episode 13 (Sunday, April 7, 2019)	Wisin	8	Brisila Barros	"Reggaeton Lento"	Eliminated
Episode 13 (Sunday, April 7, 2019)	Carlos Vives	9	Sheniel Maisonet	"Elastic Heart"	Vives's choice
Episode 13 (Sunday, April 7, 2019)	Carlos Vives	10	Manny Cabo	"El Perdedor"	Eliminated
Episode 13 (Sunday, April 7, 2019)	Wisin	11	Frances Dueñas	"Scars to Your Beautiful"	Wisin's choice
Episode 13 (Sunday, April 7, 2019)	Wisin	12	Yashira Rodriguez	"Dueles"	Wisin's choice
Episode 13 (Sunday, April 7, 2019)	Carlos Vives	13	Abel Flores	"Como Mirarte"	Public's vote
Episode 13 (Sunday, April 7, 2019)	Wisin	14	Johnny Bliss	"Treat You Better"	Eliminated
Episode 13 (Sunday, April 7, 2019)	Wisin	15	Mayré Martínez	"Amorfoda"	Public's vote
Episode 13 (Sunday, April 7, 2019)	Carlos Vives	16	Mava Gonzalez	"Ecos de Amor"	Public's vote

Non-competition performances
Order	Performer	Song
12.1	Luis Fonsi and his team	"Aquí Estoy Yo"/ "No Me Doy por Vencido"/ "Imposible"/ "Despacito"
12.2	Alejandra Guzmán and her team	“Volverte a Amar”/ “Día de Suerte”/ “Mi Peor Error”/ “Eternamente Bella”
13.1	Wisin and his team	"Aullando"/ "Me niego"/ "Escápate Conmigo"/ "Adrenalina"
13.2	Carlos Vives and his team	"Déjame Entrar"/ "Si Me Das Tu Amor"/ "Cuando Nos Volvamos a Encontrar"/ "La Bicicleta"

=== Week 3: Semifinal (April 14) ===
Team Wisin and Team Vives' results of last week were announced during the night.

Episode	Coach	Order	Artist	Song	Result
Episode 14 (Sunday, April 14, 2019)	Luis Fonsi	1	Jerry Montañez	"La Nave del Olvido"	Eliminated
Episode 14 (Sunday, April 14, 2019)	Alejandra Guzmán	2	Ruben Sandoval	"Cuándo yo quería ser grande"	Eliminated
Episode 14 (Sunday, April 14, 2019)	Alejandra Guzmán	3	Genesis Diaz	"Como Tu Mujer"	Eliminated
Episode 14 (Sunday, April 14, 2019)	Luis Fonsi	4	Jeidimar Rijos	"Preciosa"	Public's vote
Episode 14 (Sunday, April 14, 2019)	Alejandra Guzmán	5	Kari Santoyo	"Ojalá Que Llueva Café"	Eliminated
Episode 14 (Sunday, April 14, 2019)	Wisin	6	Mayré Martínez	"Mi Tierra"	Public's vote
Episode 14 (Sunday, April 14, 2019)	Luis Fonsi	7	Abdiel Pacheco	"A Puro Dolor"	Eliminated
Episode 14 (Sunday, April 14, 2019)	Alejandra Guzmán	8	Dunia Ojeda	"Ojos Así"	Public's vote
Episode 14 (Sunday, April 14, 2019)	Wisin	9	Ronny Mercedes	"Bachata Rosa"	Eliminated
Episode 14 (Sunday, April 14, 2019)	Carlos Vives	10	Abel Flores	"Eso y Más"	Eliminated
Episode 14 (Sunday, April 14, 2019)	Wisin	11	Francés Dueñas	"No Me Queda Más"	Eliminated
Episode 14 (Sunday, April 14, 2019)	Carlos Vives	12	Lluvia Vega	"El Pastor"	Eliminated
Episode 14 (Sunday, April 14, 2019)	Wisin	13	Yashira Rodríguez	"Bendita tu luz"	Eliminated
Episode 14 (Sunday, April 14, 2019)	Carlos Vives	14	Sheniel Maisonet	"Te Boté"	Eliminated
Episode 14 (Sunday, April 14, 2019)	Luis Fonsi	15	Katherine Lopez	"Creo en tí"	Eliminated
Episode 14 (Sunday, April 14, 2019)	Carlos Vives	16	Mava Gonzalez	"I Will Survive"	Public's vote

=== Week 4: Finale (April 21) ===
The final night featured duets and group performances from the semi-finalists as well as performances from guest artists. After all artists performed, host Jacqueline Bracamontes announced the four artists who received the most votes from the public in no particular order. The final results were announced shortly after, without any competition performances from the top 4 involved.

Order	Performers	Song
15.1	Carlos Vives and Sebastián Yatra	"Robarte un Beso"
15.2	Lluvia Vega & Ruben Sandoval	"Rayando El Sol"
15.3	Team Wisin	"Taki Taki"
15.4	Jerry Montañez & Dunia Ojeda	"Rebelión"
15.5	Abel Flores & Katherine Lopez	"Someone Like You"
15.6	Jeidimar Rijos & Francés Dueñas	"Ya Me Enteré"
15.7	Team Carlos Vives	"Pégate"
15.8	Yashira Rodríguez & Kari Santoyo	"Lloro Por Ti"
15.9	Team Luis Fonsi	"Je l'aime à mourir"
15.10	Ronny Mercedes & Shenniel Maisonet	"Girls Like You"
15.11	Mayré Martínez & Abdiel Pacheco	"Baila Baila Baila"
15.12	Team Alejandra Guzmán	"Mientes"
15.13	Alejandra Guzmán	"Hacer el Amor con Otro"
15.14	Mava Gonzalez & Genesis Diaz	"Raise Your Glass"
15.15	Wisin & Yandel with Reik	"Duele"
15.16	Luis Fonsi & Ozuna	"Imposible"

==== Final result ====
Artist	Team	Result
Jeidimar Rijos	Luis Fonsi	Winner
Mayré Martínez	Wisin	Runner-up
Mava Gonzalez	Carlos Vives	Third place
Dunia Ojeda	Alejandra Guzmán	Fourth place

== Elimination Chart ==
=== Overall ===
Color key
Artist's info

- Team Wisin
- Team Guzmán
- Team Fonsi
- Team Vives

Result details

- Winner
- Runner-up
- Third place
- Fourth place
- Saved by the public
- Saved by his/her coach
- Eliminated
- Did not perform on that week

Live Show Results per week
Artists	Week 1	Week 2	Week 3	Week 4 Finale
Jeidimar Rijos	Safe		Safe	Winner
Mayré Martínez		Safe	Safe	Runner-up
Mava Gonzalez		Safe	Safe	Third place
Dunia Ojeda	Safe		Safe	Fourth place
Abdiel Pacheco	Safe		Eliminated	Eliminated (week 3)
Lluvia Vega		Safe	Eliminated	Eliminated (week 3)
Sheniel Maisonet		Safe	Eliminated	Eliminated (week 3)
Ruben Sandoval	Safe		Eliminated	Eliminated (week 3)
Yashira Rodriguez		Safe	Eliminated	Eliminated (week 3)
Kari Santoyo	Safe		Eliminated	Eliminated (week 3)
Jerry Montañez	Safe		Eliminated	Eliminated (week 3)
Abel Flores		Safe	Eliminated	Eliminated (week 3)
Ronny Mercedes		Safe	Eliminated	Eliminated (week 3)
Frances Dueñas		Safe	Eliminated	Eliminated (week 3)
Genesis Dias	Safe		Eliminated	Eliminated (week 3)
Katherine Lopez	Safe		Eliminated	Eliminated (week 3)
Paola Lebron		Eliminated	Eliminated (week 2)	
Ana Senko		Eliminated	Eliminated (week 2)	
Yailenis Perez		Eliminated	Eliminated (week 2)	
Yireh Pizarro		Eliminated	Eliminated (week 2)	
Stephanie Amaro		Eliminated	Eliminated (week 2)	
Brisila Barros		Eliminated	Eliminated (week 2)	
Manny Cabo		Eliminated	Eliminated (week 2)	
Johnny Bliss		Eliminated	Eliminated (week 2)	
Francisco González	Eliminated	Eliminated (week 1)		
Elvin Ramos	Eliminated	Eliminated (week 1)		
Adrianna Foster	Eliminated	Eliminated (week 1)		
Elahim Davis	Eliminated	Eliminated (week 1)		
Verónica Rodríguez	Eliminated	Eliminated (week 1)		
Deanette Rivas	Eliminated	Eliminated (week 1)		
Eldiberto Carmenetty	Eliminated	Eliminated (week 1)		
Raymundo Monge Jr.	Eliminated	Eliminated (week 1)		

=== Teams ===
Color key
Artist's info

- Team Wisin
- Team Guzmán
- Team Fonsi
- Team Vives

Results details

- Winner
- Runner-up
- Third place
- Fourth place
- Eliminated
- Did not perform on that week

Artists	Week 1	Week 2	Week 3	Week 4 Finale
Mayré Martínez		Public's vote	Public's vote	Runner-up
Ronny Mercedes		Public's vote	Eliminated	
Frances Dueñas		Coach's choice	Eliminated	
Yashira Rodriguez		Coach's choice	Eliminated	
Johnny Bliss		Eliminated		
Yailenis Perez		Eliminated		
Stephanie Amaro		Eliminated		
Brisila Barros		Eliminated		
Dunia Ojeda	Public's vote		Public's vote	Fourth place
Ruben Sandoval	Public's vote		Eliminated	
Kari Santoyo	Coach's choice		Eliminated	
Genesis Dias	Coach's choice		Eliminated	
Elvin Ramos	Eliminated			
Adrianna Foster	Eliminated			
Verónica Rodríguez	Eliminated			
Deanette Rivas	Eliminated			
Jeidimar Rijos	Public's vote		Public's vote	Winner
Jerry Montañez	Public's vote		Eliminated	
Abdiel Pacheco	Coach's choice		Eliminated	
Katherine Lopez	Coach's choice		Eliminated	
Raymundo Monge Jr.	Eliminated			
Ediberto Carmenatty	Eliminated			
Francisco González	Eliminated			
Elahim David	Eliminated			
Mava Gonzalez		Public's vote	Public's vote	Third place
Abel Flores		Public's vote	Eliminated	
Lluvia Vega		Coach's choice	Eliminated	
Sheniel Maisonet		Coach's choice	Eliminated	
Paola Lebron		Eliminated		
Ana Senko		Eliminated		
Yireh Pizarro		Eliminated		
Manny Cabo		Eliminated		

== Artists' appearance on other shows ==
- Mayré Martínez was the winner of the first season of Latin American Idol.
- Manny Cabo and Ivonne Acero both took part in on the ninth season of the English U.S. version but were eliminated during the Battle round and Live Playoffs respectively.
- Genesis Diaz and Johnny Bliss both competed in the fourteenth season of the English American U.S. version but were eliminated during the Battle round and Live Playoffs respectively.
- Lluvia Vega competed in La Reina De La Cancion & on the first season of La Voz... México and finished at the top 8.
- Brisila Barros was on the first season of El Factor X United States.
- Jeidimar Rijos competed in the first season of La Voz Kids but was eliminated in the Semifinals. She also competed in the second season of La Banda and reached Top 24.
- Kemily Corrales competed in the first season of La Voz Kids but was eliminated in the Live shows.
- Yailenys Pérez was on the second season of La Voz Kids but was eliminated in the Battle rounds.
- Katherine Lopez and Sheniel Maisonet passed the audition on the second season of La Banda but failed to continue towards the second phase of the competition.
- Sheniel Maisonet would appear on the 18th season of American Idol, being eliminated in the Hollywood round.
- Yashira Rodríguez and Veronica Rodriguez both were on the second season of La Banda but were eliminated at the Top 36 and Quarterfinals respectively.
- Mari Burelle, competing as MARi, represents the state of New Hampshire in the first season of American Song Contest with her song "Fly".

== Ratings ==
Viewership and ratings per episode of La Voz (American TV series) season 1
No.	Title	Air date	Timeslot (ET)	Rating/share (18–49)	Viewers (millions)
1	"The Blind Auditions, Part 1"	January 13, 2019	Sunday 9:00 p.m.	0.5/2	1.38
2	"The Blind Auditions, Part 2"	January 20, 2019	Sunday 9:00 p.m.	0.5/2	1.41
3	"The Blind Auditions, Part 3"	January 27, 2019	Sunday 9:00 p.m.	0.6/3	1.58
4	"The Blind Auditions, Part 4"	February 3, 2019	Sunday 9:00 p.m.	0.5/2	1.35
5	"The Blind Auditions, Part 5"	February 10, 2019	Sunday 9:00 p.m.	0.5/2	1.52
6	"The Blind Auditions, Part 6"	February 17, 2019	Sunday 9:00 p.m.	0.5/2	1.68
7	"The Battles, Part 1"	February 24, 2019	Sunday 9:00 p.m.	0.5/2	1.40
8	"The Battles, Part 2"	March 3, 2019	Sunday 9:00 p.m.	0.5/2	1.57
9	"The Battles, Part 3"	March 10, 2019	Sunday 9:00 p.m.	0.5/2	1.46
10	"The Battles, Part 4"	March 17, 2019	Sunday 9:00 p.m.	0.4/2	1.19
11	"The Battles, Part 5"	March 24, 2019	Sunday 9:00 p.m.	0.3/1	1.06
12	"Live Playoffs, Part 1"	March 31, 2019	Sunday 8:30 p.m.	0.4/2	1.24
13	"Live Playoffs, Part 2"	April 7, 2019	Sunday 8:30 p.m.	0.4/2	1.12
14	"Semifinals"	April 14, 2019	Sunday 8:30 p.m.	0.3/4	1.12
15	"Finale"	April 21, 2019	Sunday 8:30 p.m.	0.5/2	1.44
