= Mayré Martínez =

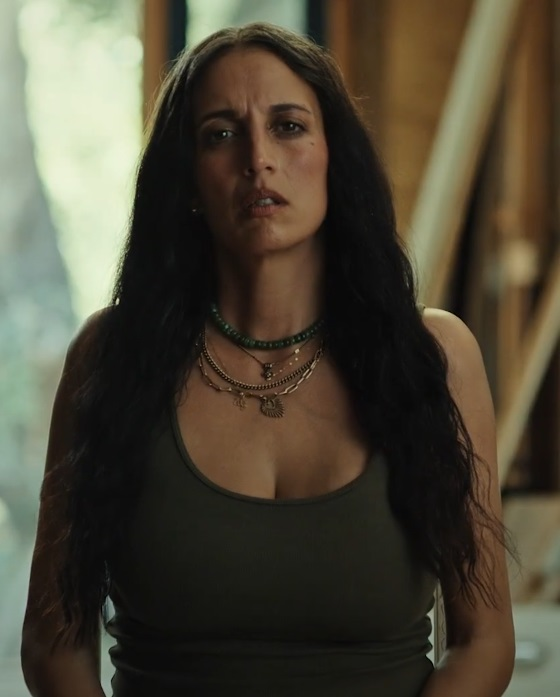

Background information
- Also known as: Dory
- Born: Mayré Andrea de los Ángeles Martínez Blanco; 28 November 1978 (age 47)
- Origin: Caracas, Venezuela
- Genres: Pop, Latin, R&B
- Occupations: Professional singer, singing teacher, vocal coach
- Instrument: Vocals
- Years active: 2005–present
- Label: Sony BMG (2006–2008)
- Website: https://mayremartinez.com/

Mayré Andrea de los Ángeles Martínez Blanco (born in Caracas Venezuela November 28, 1978), is a Latin pop singer, songwriter. She rose to popularity in Latin America after winning the first season of the reality show Latin American Idol. In her native country, Venezuela, she was a contestant in Radio Caracas Television's reality show Fama, Sudor y Lágrimas 2006, where she came in fifth place, because she decided to back out to join the cast of Latin American Idol. She's the oldest contestant ever to win Latin American Idol prior to being the first winner.

== Career ==
Martínez is a professional singer, singing teacher, and vocal coach. She created a technique named after herself. She started her singing studies in 1983, with many private teachers coming from all over the world. She studied music in the conservatory "Lino Gallardo" and keyboard in the "Roland Learning Center". She started singing professionally in 1994, performing in countless productions and television advertisings of well-known brands such as Barbie, Ford, and Fundición Pacifico, among others. At present, she is participating in more advertising campaigns, the most recent being TOMI TIPI – some of them made in her own studio.

In 1998, she was invited by Ricardo Montaner, to sing in the chorus, during his tour "Es Así" (It's in this way). Between 1999 and 2001 she entered in several concerts along with the musical producer and guitarist Iván Weinreb, around Venezuela, and internationally. In 2000, they won an award as International talent by the "Festival de la Canción Latinoamericana" (Festival of Latino-American Song) in California for the song composed by Martínez and Weinberg, titled "Con Nadie Más" (With No One Else). In 2001, Martínez and Weinberg decided to found the "Academia El Arte de Cantar" (The Art of Singing Academy).

At the end of 2004 the International Association of Musical Education included the Academy on their related organizations' directory, recognizing it as the best singing academy in Venezuela. Since 2002, Martínez has carried out every year the Mayré Martínez Singing Festival, a concert where her students perform for their family and friends.

On the night of October 26, 2006, she won the first place on the Idol franchise's new show Latin American Idol, beating out approximately 25,000 people who showed up in different cities throughout South America. After several ups and downs she managed to record her first studio album in early 2007; Soy Mi Destino was released in Mexico in May 2007, and in Venezuela in August 2007; it was a compilation album with the studio version of the songs she'd sung in Latin American Idol, and it also included a DVD with the live performances from the show.

On November 9, 2008, Martínez released a second single from her upcoming album, "Dame 3"; the single was also released with a music video.

In 2019, she participated on Telemundo's La Voz first season and was declared the runner-up.

== Latin American Idol ==
=== Performances/Results ===
Episode	Theme	Song choice	Original artist	Order #	Result
Audition	Auditioner's Choice	"Fallin'"	Alicia Keys	N/A	Advanced
Selection Process	Auditioner's Choice	"Amar sin ser amada"	Thalía	N/A	Advanced
Selection Process	Auditioner's Choice	"Regresa a mí"	Toni Braxton	N/A	Advanced
Workshop No. 1	Contestant's Choice	"Héroe"	Mariah Carey		Advanced
Top 10	Personal Idol	"La Cima del Cielo"	Ricardo Montaner		Safe
Top 9	80's Hits	"Te Amo"	Franco De Vita		Safe
Top 8	Hispanic Songs	"¿Dónde esta la vida?"	Francisco Céspedes		Safe
Top 7	Franco De Vita songs	"Esta Vez"	Franco De Vita		Safe
Top 6	Women Homage	"Tú"	Shakira		Safe
Top 5	Latin Rhythm	"Mi Bombón"	Andrés Cabas		Safe
Top 5	Latin Rhythm	"Corazón Espinado"	Maná ft. Carlos Santana		Safe
Top 4	Spanish Rock	"Rayando el sol"	Maná		Safe
Top 4	Spanish Rock	"Obsesión"	Miguel Mateos		Safe
Top 3	Top 40	"Vuelve"	Ricky Martin		Safe
Top 3	Top 40	"Experiencia Religiosa"	Enrique Iglesias		Safe
Top 2	Finale	"Quiero Soñar"	Mayré Martínez		Winner
Top 2	Finale	"Corazón Espinado"	Maná ft. Carlos Santana		Winner
Top 2	Finale	"Soy Mi Destino"	Mayré Martínez		Winner

== Discography ==
=== Albums ===
- Soy Mi Destino (2007)
- La Reina de la Noche (2009)
- My Black & Blanco (2015)

=== Singles ===
- Soy Mi Destino (2007)
- Corazón Espinado (2007)
- La Reina de la Noche (2008)
- Dame 3 (2008)
- Hay Una Voz (2009)
- Mírame (2009)
- Junto a Mí (2010)
