= La Reina de la Noche (album) =

Studio album by Mayré Martínez
- Released: October 22, 2009
- Recorded: 2008–2009
- Genres: Pop, dance
- Length: 36:26
- Label: Mayre Martinez Producciones

Mayré Martínez chronology
Soy Mi Destino (2007)	La Reina de la Noche (2009)

Singles from La Reina de la Noche
- 1. "La Reina de la Noche" Released: May 2008; 2. "Dame 3" Released: August 2008; 3. "Hay Una Voz" Released: June 2009; 4. "Mírame" Released: October 2009; 5. "Junto a Mí" Released: 2010

La Reina de la Noche (The Queen of the Night) is the second album by Latin American Idol winner Mayré Martínez. The album was produced independently by the singer's production company, Mayre Martinez Producciones. On October 22, 2009, the album was made available as a digital release in Amazon.com and iTunes. On October 25, 2009, the album was released physically in Venezuela; a worldwide physical release is yet to be announced.

== Track listing ==
Digital version
No.	Title	Writer(s)	Producer(s)	Length
1.	"Atracción"	Mayré Martínez	Mayré Martínez, Alejandro García	3:46
2.	"Mírame"	Mayré Martínez	Mayré Matínez, Alejandro García	3:28
3.	"Vivir Sin Tí"	Mayré Martínez	Mayré Martínez, Alejandro García	4:12
4.	"Tu Amor"	Mayré Martínez	Mayré Matínez, Alejandro García	3:35
5.	"Dame 3"	Mayré Martínez	Mayré Martínez, Jesús Sánchez	3:06
6.	"¿Qué Es Esto Que Siento?"	Mayré Martínez	Mayré Martínez, Alejandro García	3:31
7.	"Gracias"	Mayré Martínez	Mayré Martínez, Alejandro García	3:44
8.	"Hay Una Voz"	Mayré Martínez	Mayré Martínez, Alejandro García	3:59
9.	"La Reina de la Noche"	William Luque, Domingo Sánchez	Mayré Martínez, Jesús Sánchez	3:42
10.	"Look at Me" (English Version of "Mírame")	Mayré Martínez	Mayré Matínez, Alejandro García	3:28

Venezuelan version
No.	Title	Writer(s)	Producer(s)	Length
1.	"Atracción"	Mayré Martínez	Mayré Martínez, Alejandro García	3:46
2.	"Mírame"	Mayré Martínez	Mayré Matínez, Alejandro García	3:28
3.	"Vivir Sin Tí"	Mayré Martínez	Mayré Martínez, Alejandro García	4:12
4.	"Tu Amor"	Mayré Martínez	Mayré Matínez, Alejandro García	3:35
5.	"Dame 3"	Mayré Martínez	Mayré Martínez, Jesús Sánchez	3:06
6.	"¿Qué Es Esto Que Siento?"	Mayré Martínez	Mayré Martínez, Alejandro García	3:31
7.	"Gracias"	Mayré Martínez	Mayré Martínez, Alejandro García	3:44
8.	"Hay Una Voz"	Mayré Martínez	Mayré Martínez, Alejandro García	3:59
9.	"Junto a Mí" (Theme from the "Más Sabe el Diablo" telenovela)	Juan Carlos Rodríguez, Eiker Gastaminza	Juan Carlos Rodríguez, Eiker Gastaminza	3:44
10.	"La Reina de la Noche"	William Luque, Domingo Sánchez	Mayré Martínez, Jesús Sánchez	3:42
11.	"Look at Me" (English Version of "Mírame")	Mayré Martínez	Mayré Matínez, Alejandro García	3:28
12.	"La Reina de la Noche" (Diva Mix)	William Luque, Domingo Sánchez	DJ Manybeat	5:04

== Singles ==
The album has already released three promo singles, the most famous of them being "La Reina de la Noche".

=== La Reina de la Noche ===
The single was released in May 2008 with the intention to promote the forthcoming album. The song became an instant hit in Venezuela and in many other countries. The song become the most downloaded of the three.

=== Dame 3 ===
The song was released in late 2008 but failed to get the same attention as the previous single.

=== Hay Una Voz ===
"Hay Una Voz" is the third and last promo-only single from the album.

=== Mírame ===
"Mirame" has been announced as the fourth overall and the first fully released single from the album. Mayre Martinez started to promote the single by live performances and a music video, which has been cancelled.

=== Junto a Mí ===
"Junto a Mí" is the fifth single and the second fully released single from the album. This romantic ballad was announced as new single by Mayre Martinez on her official page Facebook. The music video for the song was released on June 21, 2010.

== Charts ==
Chart (2009/2010)	Peak
Venezuelan Album Chart	2

== Release history ==
Region	Date	Format
Venezuela	October 22, 2009	Digital single
Venezuela	October 25, 2009	Physical single
