= Adriana Betancur =

Colombian TV presenter and model

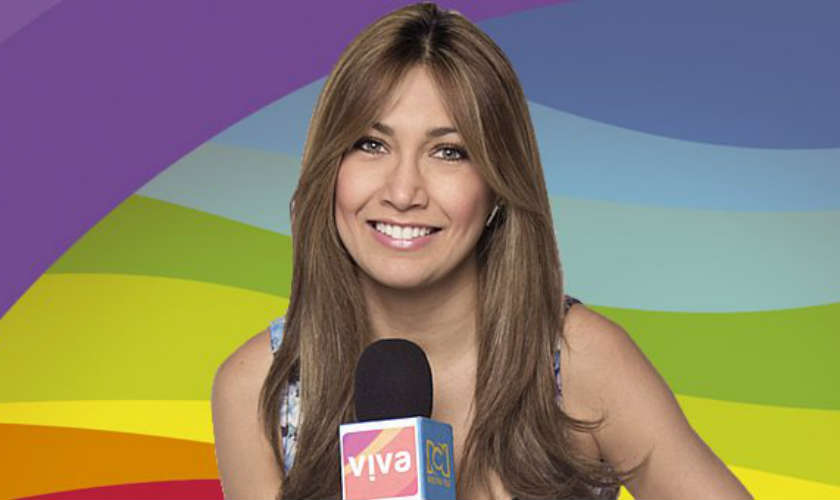
- Born: Adriana Betancur Montealegre; 1 May 1983 (age 43); Medellín
- Occupation: Presenter
- Years active: 2000–present

Adriana Betancur Montealegre (born 1 May 1983) is a Colombian TV presenter and model. She is currently the presenter for RCN Televisión's Muy buenos dias since replacing Laura Acuña.

== Biography ==
Betancur studied Audiovisual Communication and Television Production at the Jaime Isaza Cadavid Polytechnic School in Medellín. She began her career on television running errands on the sets of Cable Pacifico (Antioquia). In 2004, she entered Señorita Antioquia as a contestant but did not win. Betancur entered the 23rd National Coffee Pageant. Though she did not win, she was hired by the National Federation of Coffee Growers as a public relations adviser, a position that enabled her to produce Fedecafe, which was broadcast on Colombia's Channel One. Her career at RCN Televisión began when Darcy Quinn, Adriana Vargas and Camilo Chaparro recommended Betancur to the company and sponsored her resume, allowing Betancur to secure a contract with RCN. From there, she appeared on the morning show Como en Casa on RCN Nuestra Tele.

Betancur suffered from kidney failure from a young age and required a transplant. In the two years she spent waiting, she nearly died from kidney complications and required daily dialysis. In August 2015, she entered a relationship with actor Brian Moreno but ended the relationship the following year after the couple argued in a public place.
