= In Search of Mona Lisa =

EP by Santana
- Released: January 25, 2019
- Recorded: 2018
- Genre: Latin rock
- Length: 27:09
- Label: Concord
- Producer: Santana

Santana chronology
Santana IV (2016)	In Search of Mona Lisa (2019)	Africa Speaks (2019)

Professional ratings
Review scores
Source	Rating
AllMusic	3/5 stars

In Search of Mona Lisa is an EP by Santana released on January 25, 2019, on Concord Records.

A music video for the EP's first single, "Do You Remember Me", was released on January 24, 2019.

Santana has announced plans to release a new full-length album, produced by Rick Rubin, scheduled for mid-2019, with the EP serving as a preamble.

== Origins ==
The album takes its title from a deeply personal experience that Carlos Santana had when he visited the Louvre in Paris for the first time and saw Leonardo da Vinci's masterpiece, Mona Lisa. The artist explains to Rolling Stone that although he had been playing concerts in Paris since the early Seventies, he had never visited the Louvre until 2016. And once he did, he noticed a line like "you'd see for Beyoncé, Taylor Swift, Rihanna or Adele... I was like, 'Damn, Mona Lisa's really popular worldwide to this day.'"

Described as "dramatic", as well as "spellbinding and transportive", the album stems from recollections of a dream that Carlos Santana had months after his experience seeing the iconic work of art.

== Track listing ==
No.	Title	Writer(s)	Length
1.	"Do You Remember Me"	Carlos Santana	9:50
2.	"In Search of Mona Lisa"	Jeffrey Cohen / Santana / Narada Michael Walden	5:11
3.	"Lovers From Another Time"	Santana / Consuelo Velázquez / Walden	4:46
4.	"Do You Remember Me" (edit version)	Santana	3:30
5.	"In Search of Mona Lisa" (edit version)	Cohen / Santana / Walden	3:52

== Personnel ==
- Carlos Santana – guitar
- Cindy Blackman Santana – drums (1, 3)
- Tommy Anthony – guitar (1)
- Benny Rietveld – bass guitar (1)
- Ray Greene – vocals (1)
- Andy Vargas – vocals (1)
- David K. Matthews – keyboards (1)
- Karl Perazzo – congas, percussion and timbales (1)
- Narada Michael Walden – bass (2), drums (2, 3), keyboards (2, 3), vocals (3)
- Jim Reitzel – guitar (2)
- Cornell C.C Carter – vocals (2)
- Ron Carter – bass (3)
- Justus Dobrin – keyboard programming (3)
