= Soy Mi Destino =

Studio album by Mayré Martínez
- Released: May 21, 2007
- Recorded: 2007
- Genre: Pop
- Length: 36:08
- Label: Sony BMG
- Producers: Javier Calderón; Executive producers: Jack Alfanday; Carlos González

Mayré Martínez chronology
Soy Mi Destino (2007)	La Reina de la Noche (2009)

Singles from Soy Mi Destino
- 1. "Soy Mi Destino" Released: February 2007; 2. "Corazón Espinado" Released: July 2007

Soy Mi Destino is a compilation album by Mayré Martínez from the songs she sang in Latin American Idol, which also includes a DVD with the live performances from the show. Recorded in Mexico in early 2007, it was only released in Mexico through the internet and selected music stores, and in Venezuela, where it debuted at number 4 in the Venezuelan music chart.

The first single, "Soy Mi Destino", was released in February 2007. "Corazón Espinado" was released as the second single in July 2007.

== Track listing ==
=== CD ===
#	Title	English title	Writer	Time
1.	"Soy Mi Destino"	I´m My Destiny	Jon Secada	3:28
2.	"Quiero Soñar"	I Want To Dream	Obie Bermúdez, Sebastian Krys	3:30
3.	"La Cima Del Cielo"	The Top of the Sky	Ricardo Montaner	4:17
4.	"Te Amo"	I Love You	Franco De Vita	3:35
5.	"¿Donde Esta La Vida?"	Where Is The Live	Francisco Céspedes	3:20
6.	"Esta Vez"	This Time	Franco De Vita	3:15
7.	"Corazón Espinado"	Spiked Heart	Fher Olvera	3:53
8.	"Obsesión"	Obsession	Miguel Mateos	3:52
9.	"Experiencia Religiosa"	Religious Experience	Cheín Garcia Alonso	4:41
10.	"Héroe"	Hero	Mariah Carey, W. Afanasieff	4:17

=== DVD ===
#	Performance	Episode	Concert Theme
1.	"La Cima Del Cielo"	Top 10	A song by their favorite singer
2.	"Te Amo"	Top 9	A song from the 80s
3.	"¿Donde Esta La Vida?"	Top 8	A spañish compose
4.	"Esta Vez"	Top 7	A song from Franco De Vita
5.	"Tú"	Top 6	A dedication song for a woman in their life
6.	"Mi Bombóm" / "Corazón Espinado"	Top 5	Two songs with Latin rhythm
7.	"Obsesión" / "Rayando El Sol"	Top 4	Two Rock songs
8.	"Vuelve" / "Experiencia Religiosa"	Top 3	Two Ballad songs
9.	"Soy Mi Destino" / "Corazón Espinado" / "Quiero Soñar"	Top 2 (Finale)	Two new songs and one from their previous performances

== Release history ==
Region	Date
Mexico	May 21, 2007
Venezuela	August 15, 2007

== Notes ==
- The album only charted in Venezuela.
- The songs "Soy Mi Destino" and "Quiero Soñar" were written especially for the Latin American Idol winner.
- Mayre sang "Corazón Espinado" in the second season of the show.
