= Blessings and Miracles =

Studio album by Santana
- Released: October 15, 2021
- Recorded: 2021
- Genre: Latin rock
- Length: 56:45
- Label: Starfaith; BMG Rights Management

Santana chronology
Africa Speaks (2019)	Blessings and Miracles (2021)	Sentient (2025)

Singles from Blessings and Miracles
- 1. "Move" Released: August 18, 2021; 2. "She's Fire" Released: August 20, 2021; 3. "Whiter Shade of Pale" Released: September 24, 2021; 4. "Joy" Released: October 11, 2021; 5. "Ghost of Future Pull / New Light" Released: October 14, 2021; 6. "America For Sale" Released: October 14, 2021; 7. "Yo Estaré" Released: April 15, 2022

Blessings and Miracles is the twenty-sixth studio album by American rock band Santana. The album was released on October 15, 2021, by Starfaith LLC and BMG Rights Management and produced by Carlos Santana himself, who prepared it over the course of two years.

The album features a number of guests, including Chris Stapleton, Ally Brooke, Corey Glover, Kirk Hammett, Mark Osegueda, Chick Corea, Gayle Moran Corea, Steve Winwood and Rob Thomas, with whom Santana recorded again over 20 years after their hit "Smooth". Many of the collaborations were recorded remotely.

In July 2021, he announced his signing with BMG Rights Management to release the album.

== Concept ==
When asked about the reason behind the change of style from Africa Speaks to Blessings and Miracles, Santana said it was "intuition" which told him to "get back on the radio in the four corners of the world and touch people's hearts. Because of this [pandemic], people need hope and courage. [...] Blessings and Miracles is a divine attempt to help people have a deep sense of self-worth. There are a lot of people out there who have very low self-esteem."

He held a think tank meeting at his office and asked for names that could help him in his objective to get back on the radio.

According to Santana, the title of the album comes from "my belief that we're born with heavenly powers that allows us to create blessings and miracles". He believes music has such power. He also saw the album as "mystical medicine music to heal an infected world of fear and darkness." The cover art features an image of Tlāloc, the Aztec god of rain.

== Song information ==
"Joy", featuring Chris Stapleton, was inspired by Bob Marley's and John Lennon's ideals of union and was defined by Santana as "the ultimate medicine and remedy against fear."

The album features a cover of Procol Harum's "A Whiter Shade of Pale". According to Santana, he was in Hyde Park performing with Eric Clapton and, while Gary Clark Jr. was playing, he told Steve Winwood "I hear you singing 'A Whiter Shade of Pale' and playing the organ and me playing guitar, and doing it completely differently — more like an African, Cuban, Puerto Rican guajira style. Very sexy." With the help of Narada Michael Walden, the collaboration was arranged.

Santana originally invited Aerosmith's Steven Tyler to sing on "America for Sale", but he wasn't available, so he asked the other guest of the song (Metallica's Kirk Hammett) for a suggestion and he came up with his friend Mark Osegueda from Death Angel.

“Move” was originally written by Rob Thomas and American Authors for a separate project. After Thomas reached out to Santana to contribute guitar to the track, he decided to add it to the track list of Blessings and Miracles.

Blessings and Miracles features two songs written by Santana's children: "Breathing Underwater", by Stella, and "Rumbalero", by Salvador. When he heard the latter for the first time, he had to Shazam it to find out it was his own son's music. He requested permission from both to record their songs on his then upcoming album and both thought he was kidding at first.

"Yo Estaré", the Spanish version of the song "Break" featuring Ally Brooke, was released as a single on April 15, 2022, having previously only been released on the vinyl version of the album.

== Critical reception ==
Professional ratings
Aggregate scores
Source	Rating
Metacritic	61/100
Review scores
Source	Rating
AllMusic	3/5 stars
The Arts Desk	3/5 stars
Classic Rock	4/5 stars
Entertainment Weekly	C
Hot Press	3/10
Mojo	3/5 stars
Rolling Stone France	3.5/5 stars

According to the review aggregator Metacritic, Blessings and Miracles received "generally favorable reviews" based on a weighted average score of 61 out of 100 from 5 critic scores.

Kronen Zeitung felt that the album "only partially succeeds in terms of the quality of the 15 songs" and that it didn't "come close" to 1999's Supernatural. He thought some aspects of the album were "calculated", such as the guests.

The French edition of Rolling Stone felt that the album could be "a little too mainstream for those who dream of a 'real' return to the roots" and that Blessing and Miracles "perhaps does not carry in it the hoped-for miracles". They praised songs like "Santana Celebration" and "Peace Power" and rated the album 3.5/5.

In a review for Metal.de, Christian Flack said the album proves that Santana's "creativity and musical genius are far from exhausted" and felt it was "fresh and charismatic". He didn't see any weak moments and ultimately called it "a strong, musically broad-based [...] and highly ambitious album with a star cast and outstanding guitar solos."

Writing for Laut.de, Philipp Kause saw the album as a sort of a "sampler" due to the many guests and genres and congratulated it for containing "something for everyone". He also felt that the album "seems much more suitable for everyday use, less cerebral, no longer tailored to a jazz / exoticism elite" and that "snippets of film from the Woodstock concert document will appear in your mind's eye while listening to it". On the other hand, he felt that the album failed at harmonizing "the beautiful charm of such sentimental songs like 'Whiter Shade of Pale' with crowbar production".

Michael Galluci felt the album is "all over the place, but not without occasional highlights". He thought the album constantly shifts from songs reminiscent of their earliest years to music similar to Abraxas' and Shaman's. He also thought Santana wasn't as overshadowed by the guests as he was in his successful 1990s/2000s albums. He finished his review by calling it "a more genuine representation of Santana's music as they roll into another decade."

AllMusic's Stephen Thomas Erlewine saw the album's spirit as "formulaic" rather than "fresh" as it was in 1999 (when Supernatural was released). He felt the guest vocalists were genuinely enthusiastic about their songs and conceded that "awkward fusions" such as G-Eazy's and Diane Warren's feats "make Blessings and Miracles seem like an album created by artists and not in a corporate boardroom". He ultimately said "that these diverse strands don't quite get threaded together is OK: as a collection of moments, Blessings and Miracles does the job."

== Track listing ==
No.	Title	Writer(s)	Producer(s)	Length
1.	"Ghost of Future Pull / New Light"	Santana	Santana	1:24
2.	"Santana Celebration"	Santana; Manu Dibango; Louis de la Cour	Santana	3:18
3.	"Rumbalero" (featuring Salvador Santana and Asdru Sierra)	Santana; Salvador Santana; Asdru Sierra	Salvador Santana; Benny Rietveld; Asdru Sierra	3:56
4.	"Joy" (featuring Chris Stapleton)	Santana; Chris Stapleton	Chris Stapleton	3:46
5.	"Move" (featuring Rob Thomas and American Authors)	Zac Barnett; Santana; Rob Thomas; Matt Sanchez; Dave Rublin	Santana; Gregg Wattenberg; American Authors	2:45
6.	"Whiter Shade of Pale" (featuring Steve Winwood)	Gary Brooker; Keith Reid; Matthew Charles Fisher	Santana; Narada Michael Walden	4:53
7.	"Break" (featuring Ally Brooke)	Diane Warren	Peter Stengaard	5:16
8.	"She's Fire" (featuring Diane Warren and G-Eazy)	Warren; Gerald Gillum	Stengaard; Ish Cano	3:32
9.	"Peace Power" (featuring Corey Glover)	Teddy Makombe; Santana; Corey Glover	Santana; Rick Rubin	4:40
10.	"America for Sale" (featuring Kirk Hammett and Marc Osegueda)	Santana	Santana; Rubin	6:13
11.	"Breathing Underwater" (featuring Stella Santana, Avi Snow and MVCA)	Stella Santana; Marcus Burghardt; Justin Sales Koilparampil; Avi Snow	MVCA	3:34
12.	"Mother Yes"	Santana; Nat Osaman; Loveliest Kofi Addison; Edwin Okoe Fiscian	Santana; Rubin	4:35
13.	"Song for Cindy"	Santana; Walden	Santana; Walden	3:49
14.	"Angel Choir/All Together" (featuring Chick Corea and Gayle Moran Corea)	Gayle Moran Corea; Chick Corea	Santana	3:17
15.	"Ghost of Future Pull II"	Santana	Santana	1:47
Total length:				56:45

== Personnel ==
Santana

- Carlos Santana – lead and rhythm guitars, percussion (1 and 15)
- Cindy Blackman Santana – drums (except on 4 and 7)
- Benny Rietveld – bass (except on 4, 7, and 13)
- David K. Mathews – keyboards (except on 7 and 13)
- Karl Perazzo – timbales, congas, percussion (except on 5), vocals (3 and 12)
- Andy Vargas – lead vocals (7)
- Tommy Anthony – rhythm guitar (9, 10, and 12), lead vocals (12)

Paoli Mejias and Ray Greene are also credited on the album as members of the Santana touring band but do not perform on any of the tracks.

Additional musicians

- Salvador Santana – keyboards (3), vocals (3)
- Asdru Sierra – synthesizer and drum programming (3), lead vocals (3)
- Chris Stapleton – lead vocals (4), backing vocals (4), guitar (4)
- J.T. Cure – bass guitar (4)
- Derek Mixon – drums (4)
- Tammy Rogers – violin (4), octave violin (4)
- Rob Thomas – lead vocals (5)
- Zac Barnett – lead and backing vocals (5)
- Matt Sanchez – percussion (5), programming (5), backing vocals (5)
- Andy Snitzer – tenor and baritone saxophones (5), horn arrangement (5)
- Michael Davis – trombone (5)
- Raúl Agraz – trumpet (5)
- Tony Kadleck – trumpet (5)
- Cindy Mizelle, Dave Rublin, Erica Hansen, Jerry Barnes, Jessie Wagner, Katie Sanchez, Lisa Fischer – backing vocals (5)
- Steve Winwood – lead vocals (6)
- Narada Michael Walden – keyboards (6, 13), bass (13), drum programming (13)
- Justus Dobrin – additional keyboards (6)
- Ally Brooke – lead vocals (7)
- Peter Stengaard – keyboards (7, 8), programming (7), drums (7), bass (7), additional guitar (7)
- G-Eazy – lead vocals (8)
- Ish Cano – additional guitar (8), programming (8), vocals (8)
- Gerald Gillum – rap composition (8)
- Corey Glover – lead vocals (9)
- Mark Osegueda – lead vocals (10)
- Kirk Hammett – lead guitar (10)
- Stella Santana – lead vocals (11)
- Avi Snow – guitar (11), backing vocals (11)
- Gayle Moran Corea – lead vocals (14), angel choir (14)
- Chick Corea – keyboards (14)

== Charts ==
Chart performance for Blessings and Miracles
Chart (2021)	Peak position
Austrian Albums (Ö3 Austria)	13
Belgian Albums (Ultratop Flanders)	147
Belgian Albums (Ultratop Wallonia)	100
Czech Albums (ČNS IFPI)	66
French Albums (SNEP)	89
German Albums (Offizielle Top 100)	7
Italian Albums (FIMI)	52
Polish Albums (ZPAV)	16
Portuguese Albums (AFP)	25
Scottish Albums (OCC)	38
Swiss Albums (Schweizer Hitparade)	15
UK Independent Albums (OCC)	13
UK Rock & Metal Albums (OCC)	2
US Independent Albums (Billboard)	39
US Top Album Sales (Billboard)	17
US Top Rock Albums (Billboard)	38
