= Santana IV =

Studio album by Santana
- Released: April 15, 2016
- Recorded: 2014–2015
- Studios: Audio Mix House, Henderson, Nevada; Tarpan Studios, San Rafael, California; The Bubble, Austin, Texas; Notify Studios
- Genre: Latin rock
- Length: 75:26
- Label: Santana IV
- Producer: Santana

Santana chronology
Corazón – Live from Mexico: Live It To Believe It (2014)	Santana IV (2016)	In Search of Mona Lisa (2019)

Singles from Santana IV
- 1. "Anywhere You Want to Go" Released: February 5, 2016

Santana IV is the twenty-fourth studio album (and the thirty-eighth album overall) by American rock band Santana, released in April 2016.

== Overview ==
Production of the album reunited most of the surviving members from the early 1970s lineup of the band (including Carlos Santana, Gregg Rolie, Neal Schon, Mike Carabello and Michael Shrieve) and was the first time that the quintet had recorded together since 1971's Santana III. Timbalist José Areas was not invited to participate. Joining these "core" members were later Santana members Karl Perazzo (percussion) and Benny Rietveld (bass), with vocalist Ronald Isley guesting on two cuts. Santana IV contains 16 new tracks written and produced by the band.

== Origins ==
The origins for the reunion went back several years, when Schon suggested that he and Carlos Santana record together. Santana liked the idea but went on to suggest that they recruit Rolie, Shrieve and Carabello for what would be called Santana IV (picking up where they left off on Santana III). After initial writing sessions and rehearsals took place in 2013, the group recorded throughout 2014 and 2015, resulting in 16 new tracks that combine their signature elements of Afro-Latin rhythms, vocals, blues-psychedelic guitar solos, and percussion work.

Santana said, of the restored lineup: "It was magical, we didn't have to try to force the vibe – it was immense. From there, we then needed to come up with a balance of songs and jams that people would immediately identify as classic Santana."

== Promotion ==
The first single from Santana IV, entitled "Anywhere You Want to Go", was released on February 5, 2016.

== Critical reception ==
Professional ratings
Aggregate scores
Source	Rating
Metacritic	65/100
Review scores
Source	Rating
Rolling Stone	3.5/5 stars
Consequence	C+
Sputnikmusic	3.6/5
Record Collector	4/5 stars

Thom Jurek of Allmusic, in a 3.5/5 star review remarked, "Unlike the reunions of most classic rockers, this one proves its musical mettle, even when the album gives in to excess. The interplay between the guitarists is fiery, while Rolie and Shrieve have never been less than inspiring...At over 75 minutes, Santana IV would have benefitted greatly from judicious editing...Flaws aside, IV is quite enjoyable -- especially split over a couple of listens. There remains a real musical connection and shared joy between these players. They may not sound young, radical, or reckless, but they do come off as if they never stopped playing and discovering together."

== Commercial performance ==
In the United States, Santana IV debuted at number 5 on the Billboard 200, with 42,000 album-equivalent units; it sold 40,000 copies in its first week. Santana IV became Santana's fourteenth top ten album on the Billboard 200.

== Track listing ==
Writing credits and songs' lengths are in accord with album's inner notes.

No.	Title	Writer(s)	Length
1.	"Yambu"	Carlos Santana, Karl Perazzo	3:27
2.	"Shake It"	Neal Schon, Gregg Rolie, Michael Carabello, Karl Perazzo; arranged by Carlos Santana	4:45
3.	"Anywhere You Want to Go"	Gregg Rolie; arranged by Gregg Rolie	5:05
4.	"Fillmore East"	Carlos Santana, Neal Schon, Gregg Rolie, Michael Shrieve, Michael Carabello, Benny Rietveld, Karl Perazzo; arranged by Carlos Santana	7:44
5.	"Love Makes the World Go Round" (featuring Ronald Isley)	Carlos Santana, Nuru Kane, Thierry Fournel; arranged by Carlos Santana	4:20
6.	"Freedom in Your Mind" (featuring Ronald Isley)	Carlos Santana, Kenneth Okulolo; arranged by Carlos Santana	5:30
7.	"Choo Choo"	Carlos Santana, Igor Len, Neal Schon, Gregg Rolie, Michael Carabello; arranged by Carlos Santana	4:10
8.	"All Aboard"	Carlos Santana; arranged by Carlos Santana	2:03
9.	"Sueños"	Carlos Santana, Benny Rietveld; arranged by Benny Rietveld	5:15
10.	"Caminando"	Carlos Santana, Neal Schon, Michael Carabello, Karl Perazzo; arranged by Carlos Santana	4:21
11.	"Blues Magic"	Neal Schon, Gregg Rolie, Carlos Santana	4:26
12.	"Echizo"	Neal Schon, Michael Shrieve	3:54
13.	"Leave Me Alone"	Michael Shrieve, Gregg Rolie, Carlos Santana	4:01
14.	"You and I"	Gregg Rolie	4:20
15.	"Come as You Are"	Neal Schon, Carlos Santana, Gregg Rolie, Michael Carabello, Karl Perazzo	4:52
16.	"Forgiveness"	Neal Schon, Carlos Santana, Gregg Rolie, Claus Zundel (Gema)	7:22

== Personnel ==
Santana

- Carlos Santana – guitar, vocals
- Neal Schon – guitar, vocals
- Gregg Rolie – lead vocals, Hammond B3 organ, keyboards
- Benny Rietveld – bass
- Michael Shrieve – drums
- Michael Carabello – congas, percussion, backing vocals
- Karl Perazzo – timbales, percussion, vocals

Guest musician

- Ronald Isley – lead vocals (5, 6)

Technical

- Jim Reitzel – engineer, mixing
- Carlos Santana – mixing, production
- Heather Griffin-Vine, Michael Carabello – cover

== Charts ==
=== Weekly charts ===
Chart (2016)	Peak position
Australian Albums (ARIA)	11
Austrian Albums (Ö3 Austria)	11
Belgian Albums (Ultratop Flanders)	25
Belgian Albums (Ultratop Wallonia)	11
Canadian Albums (Billboard)	16
Dutch Albums (Album Top 100)	7
Finnish Albums (Suomen virallinen lista)	20
French Albums (SNEP)	29
German Albums (Offizielle Top 100)	5
Hungarian Albums (MAHASZ)	15
Italian Albums (FIMI)	11
Japanese Albums (Oricon)	22
New Zealand Albums (RMNZ)	8
Norwegian Albums (VG-lista)	24
Polish Albums (ZPAV)	5
Scottish Albums (Official Charts)	4
Spanish Albums (Promusicae)	32
Swedish Albums (Sverigetopplistan)	29
Swiss Albums (Schweizer Hitparade)	7
UK Albums (Official Charts)	4
UK Independent Albums (Official Charts)	2
US Billboard 200	5
US Independent Albums (Billboard)	1
US Top Rock Albums (Billboard)	2

=== Year-end charts ===
Chart (2016)	Position
Belgian Albums (Ultratop Wallonia)	145
US Top Rock Albums (Billboard)	31
