= Tommy Anthony =

American musician and member of Santana

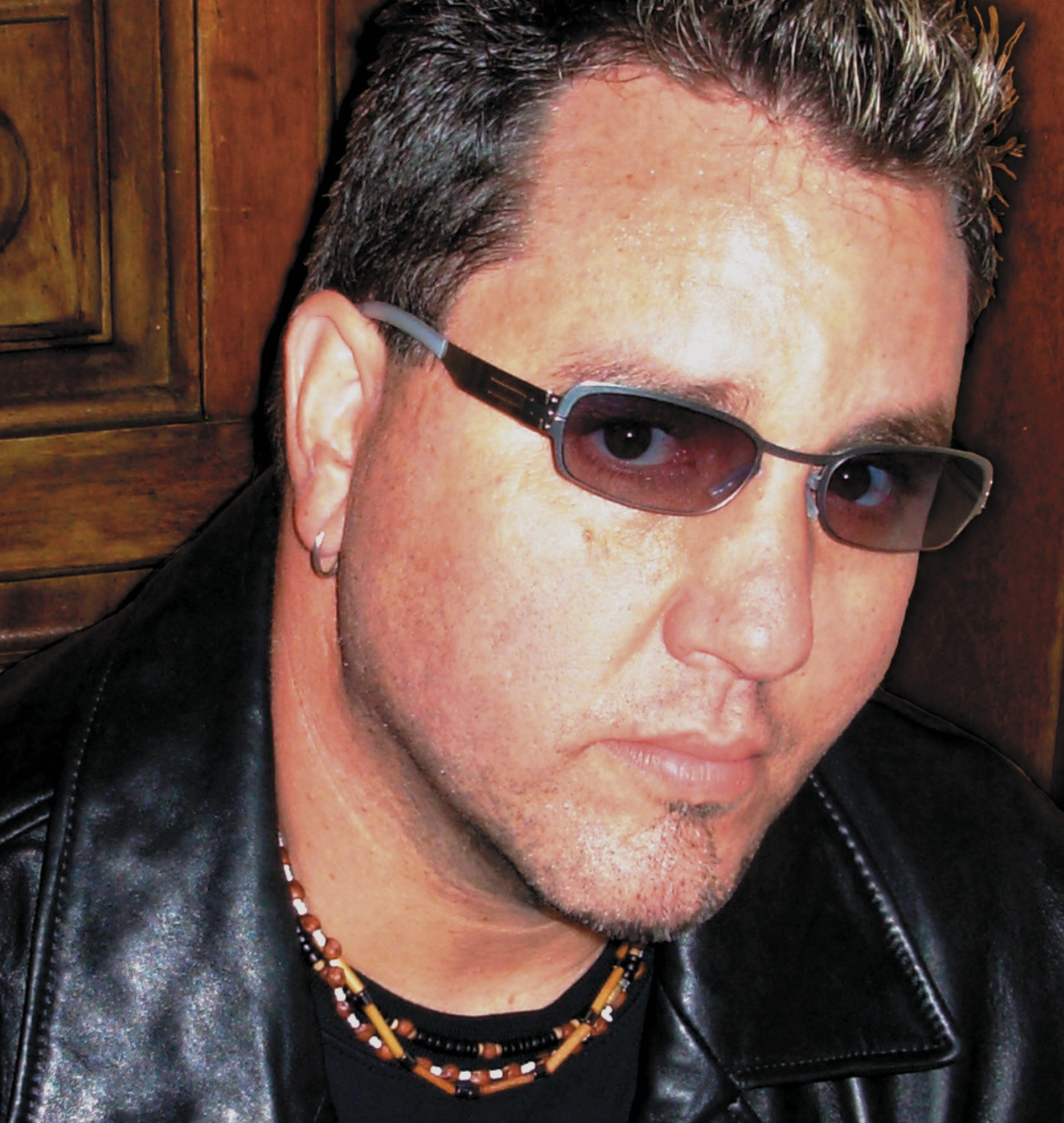
- Anthony in 2020
- Born: August 17, 1965 (age 61); New York, U.S.
- Education: Christopher Columbus High School, University of Miami
- Occupations: Singer; songwriter; musician
- Years active: 1980–present
- Musical career
- Genres: Rock; pop; Latin pop
- Labels: Epic; Sony
- Formerly of: The Tomboys; The Basics; The Beat Poets; Goza; Four O'Clock Balloon

Tommy Anthony (born August 17, 1965) is an American musician, singer, songwriter, arranger, and producer. He has released three studio albums. His single "I Don't Know You Anymore" charted in the top 40. In 2012, he won an El Premio ASCAP Award for composing the 2011 World Cup theme song. He was a featured performer at the Billboard Latin Music Conference and ASCAP's "Best Kept Secrets".

He is perhaps best known for his extensive work as a guitarist and vocalist for Santana, Gloria Estefan, and Jon Secada. He has toured and recorded with Steve Winwood, Shakira, Carole King, Celine Dion, Ricky Martin, and Enrique Iglesias.

== Early life and education ==
Thomas Anthony Maestu was born on August 17, 1965 in New York, and was raised in Miami, Florida. He began singing, playing the guitar, drums, piano, and bass as a teenager; he is a self-taught musician.

He attended Christopher Columbus High School where he teamed up with classmates Joe Alonso and Raul Malo to form the musical group The Boys, which later evolved into The Tomboys. Anthony played guitar, sang, and wrote songs for the group. They garnered a large following playing local shows and concerts.

His guitar influences are cited as Carlos Santana, Terry Kath, Jimmy Page, and Eric Clapton (with Cream). As a songwriter, Anthony cites Lennon & McCartney, James Taylor, Stevie Wonder, and Sting as influences.

He received a bachelor's degree in psychology from the University of Miami.

== Career ==
Anthony is a singer, songwriter, and multi-instrumentalist (guitar, piano, bass, percussion, programming), producer, and music arranger. He pursued a solo music career and has been a band member of The Boys, The Tomboys, The Basics, The Beat Poets, Goza, Four O'Clock Balloon, The Miami Sound Machine, and Santana.

In 1993, he became a studio session musician, playing guitar and providing vocals on albums for such artists as Ricky Martin, Shakira, Enrique Iglesias, and Mandy Moore. Anthony toured with Gloria Estefan as a guitarist and vocalist for ten years until she retired.

He was then offered a gig as Santana's guitarist and vocalist with whom he has recorded and toured with extensively from 2005 to the present day. Anthony has received press coverage about his on-stage dual-guitar performances with Carlos Santana. In an interview with NPR, when speaking about the recording of his album Africa Speaks, Santana said, "The thing that kept the flow happening - because everything's about the flow - was Tommy Anthony." Anthony has also been a featured singer and performer in Santana's concerts, performing "Roxanne" at the Smart Financial Centre in 2017.

In 1997, during the period that Anthony was touring with Jon Secada, he co-founded the musical group Four O'Clock Balloon, featuring Tommy Anthony, releasing several albums:The Four O'Clock Balloon, More Hot Air, and Up, Up, and Away. The Four O'Clock Balloon received favorable reviews and sold well at Tower Records stores in Chicago and Minneapolis. The Miami New Times voted the group Best Rock Band in 1998.

== Solo career ==
Anthony pursued a solo music career, with his genre being described as "American pop with Afro-Cuban rhythm". His 1995 debut album, Mondial, received favorable reviews with its single release, "I Don't Know You Anymore", charting at #14. In 2012, he won an El Premio ASCAP Award for composing the 2011 World Cup theme song. He has been a featured performer at the Billboard Latin Music Conference (with Sheila E.), ASCAP's "Best Kept Secrets", and the Hispanic Heritage Awards.

Anthony was signed to a publishing deal with Sony Music Publishing (ATV/New York).

He has produced music for Disney, Univision, and Comcast, and provided vocals on "A Love Before Time", the closing theme song for Crouching Tiger, Hidden Dragon, which was also included on the soundtrack.

Warner Bros. released a series of Anthony's guitar instruction videos, such as SongXpress's Early Rock & Roll, Vol. 1, California Sound for Guitar, Vol. 1, and Mag Rack's Guitar Xpress.

- Discography
- 1995 – Mondial
- 2001 – Latin Majik (Sony Disco)
- 2020 – Iguales

== Selected discography ==
- 2021 – Blessings and Miracles – Santana – guitar, vocals
- 2020 – Whiter Shade of Pale – Santana (featuring Steve Winwood) – guitar, vocals
- 2019 – Africa Speaks – Santana – guitar, vocals
- 2014 – Corazón – Santana – guitar, vocals
- 2010 – Guitar Heaven: The Greatest Guitar Classics of All Time – Santana – guitar
- 2006 – Rayito – Rayito – vocals
- 2005 – Desde Siempre – Chayanne – vocals
- 2004 – Universal Es Sergio Dalma Sergio Dalma – composer
- 2004 – The Best of Mandy Moore – Mandy Moore – vocals
- 2004 – Así Soy Yo – David Bustamante – arranger, guitar (Acoustic, electric, 12 string), programming, bateria, vocals
- 2003 – Milagro – Jaci Velasquez – vocals
- 2003 – Estrella Guía – Alexandre Pires – vocals
- 2003 – Esencia Natural – Ainhoa Cantalapiedra – guitar, programming, bateria, vocals
- 2003 – Cuarto Sin Puerta – Shalim Ortiz – vocals
- 2003 – Clave De Amor – Raúl Di Blasio / José Luis Rodríguez – vocals
- 2003 – Amar Es – Cristian Castro – vocals
- 2002 – Sensual – Roberto Perera – vocals
- 2002 – En Alma, Cuerpo y Corazon – Gisselle – vocals
- 2002 – Dame de Eso – Carlos Baute – vocals
- 2001 – Nueva Vida – Sergio Dalma – composer
- 2001 – Mandy Moore – Mandy Moore – vocals
- 2001 – Laundry Service – Shakira – vocals
- 2001 – In My Pocket – Mandy Moore – vocals
- 2000 – y Más – Myriam Hernández – vocals
- 2000 – Sound Loaded – Ricky Martin – vocals
- 2000 – Para Estar Contigo – Jaime Camil – vocals
- 2000 – Noche de cuatro lunas – Julio Iglesias – vocals
- 2000 – Crouching Tiger, Hidden Dragon (soundtrack) – Yo-Yo Ma / Tan Dun – vocals
- 2000 – Amén – Azucar Moreno – vocals
- 1999 – Ricky Martin – Ricky Martin – guitar (acoustic/electric)
- 1999 – Llegar a Ti – Jaci Velasquez – vocals
- 1998 – Dónde Están los Ladrones? – Shakira – vocals
- 1997 – Tributo a Queen: Los Grandes del Rock en Espanol – Cachorro López – guitar (electric)
- 1995 – Mondial – Tommy Anthony – primary artist
