= Una comedia macabra =

- Theatrical release poster
- Directed by: Sandro Ventura
- Written by: Sandro Ventura
- Produced by: Adolfo Aguilar; Tito Aguilar; Ani Alva Helfer; Israel Carmen; Fiorella Rodriguez; Macarena Ventura; Sandro Ventura
- Starring: Emilia Drago; Natalia Salas
- Cinematography: Hugo Shinki
- Edited by: Sandro Ventura
- Production company: Big Bang Films
- Distributed by: Cinecolor Films
- Release date: 21 September 2017
- Running time: 91 minutes
- Country: Peru
- Language: Spanish

Una comedia macabra (lit. 'A macabre comedy') is a 2017 Peruvian comedy horror film written and directed by Sandro Ventura. It stars Emilia Drago and Natalia Salas. The film is based on the micro-theater play of the same name, presented as part of the "Sinister Tales" proposal. It premiered on 21 September 2017 in Peruvian theaters.

== Synopsis ==
Ángela, a very religious and good-hearted young woman, who, faced with her boyfriend's infidelity (and to the surprise of her catechism group), is filled with fury and an uncontrollable desire for revenge. With the reluctant help of her friend Jenny, Angela will embark on the crazy and no less rugged path to celebrate a voodoo ceremony preceded by the eccentric Madame Karina.

== Cast ==
The actors participating in this film are:

- Emilia Drago as Ángela
- Adal Ramones as Damián
- Fiorella Rodríguez as Madame Karina
- Jéssica Cediel as Lamia
- Natalia Salas as Jenny
- Alicia Mercado as Jennifer
- Manolo Rojas as Policeman

== Production ==
Filming began on 19 February 2017.

== Reception ==
Una comedia macabra in an average of three weeks brought 50,000 viewers to the cinema.
