= La Reina de la Noche =

Single by Mayré Martínez

from the album La Reina de la Noche
- Released: May 25, 2008
- Recorded: 2008
- Genre: Dance
- Length: 3:41
- Songwriter(s): William Luque
- Producer(s): Jesús Sanchez

Mayré Martínez singles chronology
"Corazón Espinado" (2007)	"La Reina de la Noche" (2008)	"Dame 3" (2008)

"La Reina de la Noche" (The Queen of the Night) is a dance-pop song by Venezuelan singer Mayré Martínez and the first single from her studio album of the same name, it was released on her official website on May 25, 2008.

== Song information ==
The song is the first track from Martínez since she parted ways with previous label Sony BMG. It was written by William Luque (responsible for Menudo's and Chenoa's songs), produced by Jesús Sanchez, and it samples Mozart's opera The Magic Flute. The lyrics and music are also partly based on the character The Queen of the Night from the same opera, and it marks a change from Mayre's typical pop ballad and tropical songs to a futuristic dance style.

In reference to the new album and the first single, Mayré Martinez said:

"I'm not a ballad-kind of girl. I like them, but I want a more harmonious album. The last one was full of ballads, it was an album in which I had nothing to do with, the label didn't let me get involved in absolutely anything. This new album is completely mine, in fact, there are some songs written by me. "La Reina de la Noche" was written by William Luque, a Venezuelan composer who's had several hits in Europe. [...] The idea of Mozart's chords was mine, and then my manager also liked the idea, it was so beautiful that we were in the same page, and also the scale of chords fit perfectly for our melody".

== Promotion ==
During the month of July, Martínez was a guest in two Globovisión shows – the just-for-teenagers news show Emisión Juvenil, and the late night talk show Sábado en la Noche, where she commented about her status with the new single and the upcoming album. She also performed live in a mall in Barquisimeto, Venezuela. During August she performed the song in the charity concert "Corazones por la Vida" in Caracas, and also in the Miss Venezuela 2008 preliminary contest called "La Gala de la Belleza", which aired live in Venevisión on August 30.

The music video, produced by her own production company Mayré Martínez Producciones, was released on September 15, 2008, showing Mayre singing dressed both in a large black dress and as a construction worker.

== Charts ==
Chart (2008)	Peak position
Venezuelan Pop/Rock Singles Chart	4
