= Nadie sabe para quién trabaja =

- Theatrical release poster
- Directed by: Harold Trompetero
- Written by: Alejandro Matallana
- Produced by: Adolfo Aguilar: Andrea Suárez; Sandro Ventura
- Starring: Robinson Díaz; Jéssica Cediel; Adolfo Aguilar; Hernán Méndez Alonso; Francisco Bolívar; Claudio Cataño; Primo Rojas; Germán Quintero; Diego Camargo; Diego Mateus
- Cinematography: Ricardo Restrepo
- Edited by: Hugues Joubert
- Production companies: Trompetero Producciones; Big Bang Films
- Release dates: 25 December 2017 (Colombia); 22 February 2018 (Peru)
- Running time: 90 minutes
- Countries: Colombia; Peru
- Language: Spanish

Nadie sabe para quién trabaja (lit. 'Nobody knows who she works for') is a 2017 black comedy film directed by Harold Trompetero and written by Alejandro Matallana. It stars Robinson Díaz, Jéssica Cediel, Adolfo Aguilar, Hernán Méndez Alonso, Francisco Bolívar, Claudio Cataño, Primo Rojas, Germán Quintero, Diego Camargo and Diego Mateus.

== Synopsis ==
Simón is a Peruvian who lives in Bogotá and who does not have the right to the inheritance of his uncle, who, already dead, did not leave a will. Arturo will form an alliance with Antonia, an accountant who shares an office with him, to secure the inheritance using the most unconventional techniques, tactics, and tricks.

== Cast ==
The actors participating in this film are:

- Robinson Díaz as Arturo Pataquiva
- Jéssica Cediel as Antonia Ramirez
- Adolfo Aguilar as Simón Quispe
- Francisco Bolívar as Gustavo Rodríguez
- Diego Camargo as The insurer
- Claudio Cataño as Diego Ángel
- Hernán Méndez as Bernardo Ángel
- Cousin Rojas as Robledo

== Release ==
It premiered on 25 December 2017 in Colombian theaters, and on 22 February 2018 in Peruvian theaters.
