= Corazón Espinado =

2000 single by Santana

Single by Santana featuring Maná

from the album Supernatural
- Language: Spanish
- Released: May 30, 2000
- Genre: Latin rock; Latin pop
- Length: 4:36
- Label: Arista
- Songwriter: José Olvera
- Producers: Fher Olvera; Alex González; K. C. Porter

Santana singles chronology
"Love of My Life" (2000)	"Corazón Espinado" (2000)	"Primavera" (2001)

Maná singles chronology
"Cachito" (2000)	"Corazón Espinado" (2000)	"Ángel de Amor" (2002)

"Corazón Espinado" (Spanish pronunciation: [koɾaˈson espiˈnaðo]; transl. "Thorned Heart") is a song by Latin rock band Santana featuring Latin rock group Maná. The song was written, produced and sung by Fher Olvera, and co-produced by Alex González, and was released on May 30, 2000, as the fifth single from their 17th studio album, Supernatural (1999), and became a top-20 hit in Italy and Spain. It won the "Record of the Year" and "Best Rock Performance by a Duo or Group" at the 2000 Latin Grammy Awards. In addition, Santana and Maná performed the song at the Latin Grammys.

== Charts ==
=== Weekly charts ===
Chart (2000)	Peak position
Australia (ARIA)	160
Belgium (Ultratip Bubbling Under Flanders)	12
Belgium (Ultratip Bubbling Under Wallonia)	2
Germany (GfK)	64
Italy (FIMI)	14
Italy Airplay (Music & Media)	2
Netherlands (Single Top 100)	89
Spain (Promusicae)	2
Switzerland (Schweizer Hitparade)	39
US Latin Pop Airplay (Billboard)	22

== Release history ==
Region	Date	Format(s)	Label(s)	Ref(s).
United States	May 30, 2000	Rhythmic contemporary radio	Arista	

== Mayré Martínez cover ==
"Corazón Espinado"

Single by Mayré Martínez

from the album Soy Mi Destino
- Language: Spanish
- Released: July 2007
- Genre: Latin
- Length: 3:53
- Label: Sony BMG
- Songwriter: Fher Olvera

Mayré Martínez singles chronology
"Soy Mi Destino" (2007)	"Corazón Espinado" (2007)	"La Reina de la Noche" (2008)

In August 2006, Latin American Idol winner Mayré Martínez performed the song in the sixth concert, and it became one of her iconic performances, since it was the first time she showcased her whistle register on the show. In February 2007, her official website launched a poll for fans to decide which song they wanted to have as the next radio single from Mayre's debut album, Soy Mi Destino, the winner song was the studio-recorded cover of "Corazón Espinado". In the last few days of July 2007, the song gained heavy radio-airplay in all Latin America. Mayré performed the track in the third workshop episode of the second season of Latin American Idol, where she also presented her first album.
