= Laura Acuña =

Colombian lawyer

Laura Acuna
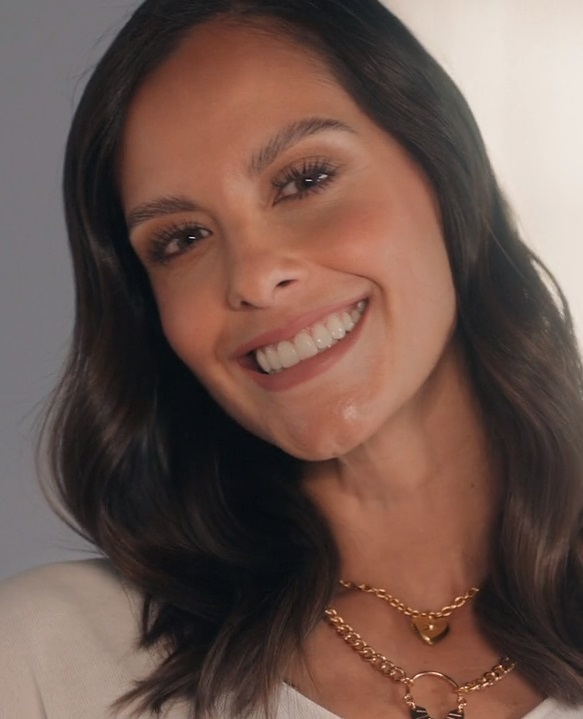
- Born: 15 June 1982 (age 44); Málaga, Santander, Colombia
- Education: Autonomous University of Bucaramanga
- Occupations: Presenter and Model

Laura Janeth Acuña Ayala is a Colombian lawyer, television presenter, and model. She was the presenter of the Muy Buenos Días magazine of RCN Televisión and presenter of the RCN Show of Noticias RCN in the 5:30 a.m. broadcast. In 2021, she participated in the musical program La Voz Kids on Caracol Televisión.

== Early life and education ==
She completed her high school studies at the Nuestra Señora del Pilar de Bucaramanga Educational Institution. Once she graduated, she began her law studies at the Autonomous University of Bucaramanga. She dedicated herself to modeling and presenting in programs of the regional channel Televisión Regional del Oriente. Upon moving to Bogotá, she was hired by RCN Televisión to host Fuera de lugar and Muy buenos días. In 2018 she completed her studies and graduated as a lawyer.

== Personal life ==
In 2006, Laura Acuña separated from Camilo Montoya, after less than two years of marriage. Soon after, she began a relationship with the music producer José Gaviria.

== Filmography ==
=== Presenter ===
Year	Title	Role	Channel
2021-2022	Sábados Felices	Presenter	Caracol Televisión
2021–present	La Voz Senior	Presenter	Caracol Televisión
2021–present	La Voz Kids	Presenter	Caracol Televisión
2021	Día a día	Guest	Caracol Televisión
2021–present	The Room of Laura Acuña	Presenter	YouTube
2019	Miss Colombia 2019-20	Presenter	RCN Televisión
2005-2021	Noticias RCN	Announcer	RCN Televisión
2005-2011	Fuera de lugar	Presenter	RCN Televisión
2005-2018	Muy buenos días	Announcer	RCN Televisión
2001-2004	Regional Television of the East	Presenter	TRO channel

=== Cinema ===
Year	Title	Character
2022	The Last Man on Earth	Liliana
