= Africa Speaks (album) =

Studio album by Santana
- Released: June 7, 2019
- Recorded: 2019
- Studios: Shangri-La (Malibu, California)
- Genre: Latin rock
- Length: 64:25
- Labels: Concord; Suretone
- Producer: Rick Rubin

Santana chronology
In Search of Mona Lisa (2019)	Africa Speaks (2019)	Blessings and Miracles (2021)

Singles from Africa Speaks
- 1. "Breaking Down the Door" Released: April 19, 2019

Africa Speaks is the twenty-fifth studio album by American rock band Santana, released on June 7, 2019, by Concord Records and Suretone Records.

The album was produced during a 10-day recording session by Rick Rubin at Rubin's Shangri-La recording studio in Malibu, during which they recorded 49 songs. Rubin and Carlos Santana used an eight-piece band (which included Santana's wife, Cindy Blackman Santana, on drums).

The first single from the album, "Breaking Down the Door", was released on April 19, 2019. In January 2019, Santana released the EP In Search of Mona Lisa, which served as a preamble to the LP. The album debuted at number three on the US Billboard 200.

== Origins ==
Africa Speaks is inspired by music from the continent of Africa, and has been called a "unique fusion of rock, Latin and jazz". Many of the album's tracks were recorded in one take. The album features vocals from Spanish singer Buika.

In January 2019, Carlos Santana spoke with Rolling Stone about his new music, explaining how he said to Rubin, "'I know you've worked with everybody like Johnny Cash and the Chili Peppers and Metallica,' And he goes, 'Well, what are you interested in doing?' I said, 'Nothing but African music.' So can you believe it? We record 49 songs in 10 days. He was very gracious, because it was like a hurricane to record six, seven songs in a day. Rick said, 'With Clive Davis, you had a bunch of guest stars and singers. Who do you want in here?' I said, 'I only want two women: Laura Mvula and Buika.' And he said, 'OK.' So we called them and they said yes."

== Release ==
Professional ratings
Aggregate scores
Source	Rating
Metacritic	87/100
Review scores
Source	Rating
AllMusic	4/5 stars
Glide	8/10 stars
Mojo	5/5 stars
Rolling Stone	3.5/5 stars

Africa Speaks was released on June 7, 2019, by Concord Records and Suretone Records. In the United States, it debuted at number three on the Billboard 200 and at number one on Top Latin Albums with 57,000 equivalent album units. It also became the Latin album with most sales in a single week since Romeo Santos' Formula, Vol. 2 in March 2014, as well as the best-performing week for a Spanish-language record since Billboard began to rank albums based on equivalent units in late 2014. It has also ranked at number one on the Latin Albums Sales chart for 13 consecutive weeks between June 22 and September 14, 2019. Africa Speaks was the best-selling Latin album of the first half of 2019 in the United States, with 63,000 copies sold as of June 20.

== Touring ==
Santana was set to headline in August 2019 at both Woodstock 50 and Bethel Woods' half-centennial celebration in Bethel, NY. Prior and before these two events, the band toured from April to November 2019 in support of the new album. The celebration show in Bethel did occur. However, Woodstock 50 was canceled due to permit issues.

== Track listing ==
All tracks are written by Carlos Santana, with additional writers noted.

No.	Title	Writer(s)	Length
1.	"Africa Speaks"	David Axelrod, Buika	4:47
2.	"Batonga"	Buika	5:43
3.	"Oye Este Mi Canto"	Buika, John Ademola Haastrup	5:58
4.	"Yo Me Lo Merezco"	Buika, Jay U Xperience, Stoneface, Drago Uboma	6:12
5.	"Blue Skies"	Buika, Laura Mvula, Mike Odumosu	9:08
6.	"Paraísos Quemados"	Buika, Mohammed Jabry	5:59
7.	"Breaking Down the Door"	Manu Chao, Buika, Drew Gonsalves, Ivan Duran and Rafael de Leon	4:30
8.	"Los Invisibles"	Buika, Rachid Taha, Steve Hillage	5:54
9.	"Luna Hechicera"	Buika, Ismaël Lô	4:47
10.	"Bembele"	Buika, Philipp Kullmann, Bojan Vuletic, Michael Timo Ehnes	5:51
11.	"Candombe Cumbele"	Buika, Easy Kabaka Brown	5:36
Total length:			64:25

Target exclusive and Japan bonus tracks
No.	Title	Writer(s)	Length
12.	"Mientras Tanto"	Buika	5:57
13.	"Dios Bendiga Tu Interior"	Buika, Hafusa Abasi, Slim Ali	5:19
Total length:			75:41

== Personnel ==
Credits adapted from the liner notes

- Buika – lead vocals
- Laura Mvula – additional vocals (5)
- Carlos Santana – guitars, percussion, backing vocals
- David K. Mathews – Hammond B3 organ, keyboards
- Salvador Santana – keyboards (7)
- Tommy Anthony – guitars, musical GPS
- Benny Rietveld – bass guitar
- Cindy Blackman Santana – drums
- Karl Perazzo – timbales, congas, percussion
- Ray Greene – trombone, backing vocals
- Andy Vargas – backing vocals
- "Dizzy" Daniel Moorehead – saxophone

=== Technical ===
- Produced by Rick Rubin
- Executive production, conception, arrangement and musical direction by Carlos Santana
- Mixed by Dana Nielsen
- Recorded by Greg Fidelman, Dana Nielsen and Rob Bisel
- Assisted by Sara Lynn Killion, Dylan Neustadter and Tyler Beans
- Additional engineering by Jim Reitzel
- Mastered by Stephen Marcussen
- Production coordination by Dave Hanych and Eric Lynn
- Production assistants: Colin Willard, Jeremy Hatcher, Garry Purchit, Gabe Smith, Chloe Poswillo and Ethan Schneiderman
- Artwork by Rudy Gutierrez
- Graphic art by Heather Griffin-Vine

== Charts ==
=== Weekly charts ===
Chart (2019)	Peak position
Australian Albums (ARIA)	55
Austrian Albums (Ö3 Austria)	9
Belgian Albums (Ultratop Flanders)	50
Belgian Albums (Ultratop Wallonia)	23
Canadian Albums (Billboard)	12
Czech Albums (ČNS IFPI)	49
Dutch Albums (Album Top 100)	63
French Albums (SNEP)	50
German Albums (Offizielle Top 100)	6
Hungarian Albums (MAHASZ)	18
Italian Albums (FIMI)	32
Japanese Albums (Oricon)	47
Polish Albums (ZPAV)	25
Portuguese Albums (AFP)	46
Scottish Albums (Official Charts)	15
Spanish Albums (Promusicae)	22
Swiss Albums (Schweizer Hitparade)	6
UK Albums (Official Charts)	35
US Billboard 200	3
US Top Latin Albums (Billboard)	1
US Latin Pop Albums (Billboard)	1
US Top Rock Albums (Billboard)	1

=== Year-end charts ===
Chart (2019)	Position
US Top Latin Albums (Billboard)	19
US Top Rock Albums (Billboard)	70
