= Greatest Hits 2 (Journey album) =

Compilation album by Journey

Greatest hits album by Journey
- Released: November 1, 2011
- Recorded: 1977–1996
- Genre: Hard rock, arena rock
- Length: 67:08
- Label: Columbia, Legacy
- Producer: Mike Stone, Kevin Elson, Roy Thomas Baker, Steve Perry, Geoffrey Workman, Kevin Shirley

Journey chronology
Eclipse (2011)	Greatest Hits 2 (2011)	Greatest Hits I & II (2013)

Professional ratings
Review scores
Source	Rating
Allmusic	4/5 stars

Greatest Hits 2 is a greatest hits album by the American rock band Journey. The album was released on November 1, 2011 by Columbia Records.

The compilation album is the band's second greatest hits package. It was released 23 years after the first greatest hits package in 1988. The album includes the remaining radio hits that were left off the first greatest hits package and fan favorites. This includes "Stone in Love", "Feeling That Way", "Anytime", "Just the Same Way", "Still They Ride", "Suzanne", "Walks Like a Lady", "The Party's Over" and "After the Fall".

== Background ==
Greatest Hits 2 was released on CD, digital download and in a gatefold double-vinyl edition. The songs were re-mastered to vinyl by Robert Hadley and former lead singer of Journey, Steve Perry. Perry said of the mastering: "I truly forgot how sonically exciting and just plain better these Journey tracks sound back where they originally lived...on vinyl. The stereo separation, the center imaging and the sonic depth of the tracks themselves is more true to what we all loved about these original final mixes. All the instruments and voices, to me personally, sound so damn good that all I want to do is reach for the volume and turn it up!".

The album was supposed to include "The Eyes of a Woman" but by request by lead guitarist Neal Schon, it was replaced by "Little Girl". Neal Schon's father, jazz musician Matthew Schon worked with the band on "Little Girl".

== Track listing ==
No.	Title	Writer(s)	from the album	Length
1.	"Stone in Love"	Steve Perry, Neal Schon, Jonathan Cain	Escape (1981)	4:25
2.	"After the Fall"	Perry, Cain	Frontiers (1983)	5:01
3.	"Chain Reaction"	Perry, Schon, Cain	Frontiers	4:19
4.	"The Party's Over (Hopelessly in Love)"	Perry	Captured (1981)	3:41
5.	"Escape"	Perry, Schon, Cain	Escape	5:17
6.	"Still They Ride"	Perry, Schon, Cain	Escape	3:48
7.	"Good Morning Girl"	Perry, Schon	Departure (1980)	1:43
8.	"Stay Awhile"	Perry, Schon	Departure	2:47
9.	"Suzanne"	Perry, Cain	Raised on Radio (1986)	3:39
10.	"Feeling That Way"	Perry, Gregg Rolie, Aynsley Dunbar	Infinity (1978)	3:28
11.	"Anytime"	Robert Fleischman, Rolie, Schon, Roger Silver, Ross Valory	Infinity	3:28
12.	"Walks Like a Lady"	Perry	Departure	3:16
13.	"Little Girl"	Perry, Schon, Rolie	Dream, After Dream (1980)	5:47
14.	"Just the Same Way"	Schon, Rolie, Valory	Evolution (1979)	3:18
15.	"Patiently"	Perry, Schon	Infinity	3:21
16.	"When I Think of You"	Perry, Cain	Trial by Fire (1996)	4:21
17.	"Mother, Father" (Live)	Perry, Cain, Schon, Matt Schon	Live in Houston 1981: The Escape Tour (2006)	5:28

== Personnel ==
Credits for Greatest Hits 2 adapted from liner notes.

Journey

- Steve Perry – lead vocals, compilation producer, producer (Raised on Radio, Live in Houston 1981)
- Neal Schon – lead and rhythm guitars, backing vocals
- Jonathan Cain – keyboards, rhythm guitar, backing vocals
- Gregg Rolie – keyboards, harmonica, backing and lead vocals ("Feeling That Way", "Anytime", "Just the Same Way")
- Ross Valory – bass, backing vocals
- Steve Smith – drums, percussion
- Aynsley Dunbar – drums, percussion

Additional musicians

- Randy Jackson – bass, backing vocals ("After the Fall", Raised on Radio)
- Larrie Londin – drums, percussion (Raised on Radio)
- Geoff Workman – keyboards, backing vocals ("The Party's Over (Hopelessly in Love)")
- Steve Minkins – percussion ("Suzanne")

Production and design

- Roy Thomas Baker – producer (Infinity, Evolution)
- Kevin Elson – producer (Departure, Dream, After Dream, Captured, Escape, Frontiers)
- Mike Stone – producer (Escape, Frontiers)
- Kevin Shirley – producer (Trial by Fire)

== Greatest Hits I & II ==
Greatest Hits I & II

Compilation album by Journey
- Released: 2011
- Genre: Arena rock
- Length: 132:29
- Label: Columbia, Legacy

Journey chronology
Greatest Hits 2 (2011)	Greatest Hits I & II (2011)	Live in Japan 2017: Escape + Frontiers (2019)

Greatest Hits I & II is a repackaging of both of Journey's Greatest Hits albums. Originally released in 2011, it was reissued in Japan in both 2013 and 2017 with different cover art.

=== Track listing ===
Disc one – Greatest Hits
No.	Title	Writer(s)	From the album	Length
1.	"Only the Young"	Perry; Schon; Cain	Vision Quest (1985)	4:17
2.	"Don't Stop Believin'"	Perry; Schon; Cain	Escape	4:10
3.	"Wheel in the Sky"	D. Valory; Schon; Fleischman	Infinity	4:12
4.	"Faithfully"	Cain	Frontiers	4:27
5.	"I'll Be Alright Without You"	Perry; Schon; Cain	Raised on Radio	4:50
6.	"Any Way You Want It"	Perry; Schon	Departure	3:21
7.	"Ask the Lonely"	Perry; Cain	Two of a Kind (1983)	3:54
8.	"Who's Crying Now"	Perry; Cain	Escape	5:00
9.	"Separate Ways (Worlds Apart)"	Perry; Cain	Frontiers	5:24
10.	"Lights"	Perry; Schon	Infinity	3:10
11.	"Lovin', Touchin', Squeezin'"	Perry	Evolution	3:54
12.	"Open Arms"	Perry; Cain	Escape	3:23
13.	"Girl Can't Help It"	Perry; Cain; Schon	Raised on Radio	3:50
14.	"Send Her My Love"	Perry; Cain	Frontiers	3:54
15.	"Be Good to Yourself"	Perry; Cain; Schon	Raised on Radio	3:51
16.	"When You Love a Woman"	Perry; Cain; Schon	Trial by Fire	4:07
Total length:				66:02

Disc two – Greatest Hits 2
No.	Title	Writer(s)	From the album	Length
1.	"Stone in Love"	Perry; Schon; Cain	Escape	4:25
2.	"After the Fall"	Perry; Cain	Frontiers	5:01
3.	"Chain Reaction"	Perry; Schon; Cain	Frontiers	4:19
4.	"The Party's Over (Hopelessly in Love)"	Perry	Captured	3:41
5.	"Escape"	Perry; Schon; Cain	Escape	5:17
6.	"Still They Ride"	Perry; Schon; Cain	Escape	3:48
7.	"Good Morning Girl"	Perry; Schon	Departure	1:43
8.	"Stay Awhile"	Perry; Schon	Departure	2:47
9.	"Suzanne"	Perry; Cain	Raised on Radio	3:39
10.	"Feeling That Way"	Perry; Rolie; Dunbar	Infinity	3:28
11.	"Anytime"	Fleischman; Rolie; Schon; Silver; Valory	Infinity	3:28
12.	"Walks Like a Lady"	Perry	Departure	3:16
13.	"Little Girl"	Perry; Schon; Rolie	Dream, After Dream	5:47
14.	"Just the Same Way"	Schon; Rolie; Valory	Evolution	3:18
15.	"Patiently"	Perry; Schon	Infinity	3:21
16.	"When I Think of You"	Perry; Cain	Trial by Fire	4:21
17.	"Mother, Father" (Live)	Perry; Cain; N. Schon; M. Schon	Live in Houston 1981	5:28
Total length:				66:27
