= Evolution Tour (Journey) =

1979 concert tour by Journey

- Tour by Journey
- Poster to the concert in Mannheim, West Germany
- Location: Asia; Europe; North America
- Associated album: Evolution
- Start date: March 1, 1979
- End date: September 2, 1979
- Legs: 3
- No. of shows: 118

Journey concert chronology
- Infinity Tour (1978); Evolution Tour (1979); Departure Tour (1980)

The Evolution Tour was a concert tour by the American rock band Journey. The tour was in support of their 1979 album Evolution which peaked at #20 on the Billboard 200 like the previous album Infinity.

== Background ==
From this tour, the band would further commit themselves to more touring, they would perform shows in Japan after having made a considerable dent in the music scene there. Following that was a lengthy tour in the United States, with ticket and album sales at their highest ever. The tour also included the show at the 1979 World Series of Rock on July 28, 1979 in Cleveland, Ohio, where they would perform with headliners Aerosmith, Ted Nugent, Thin Lizzy, AC/DC and Scorpions. The show was notable for the violence with the rowdy audience, as well as the death of one person before the show started.

At the August 5 show in Chicago's Day in the Park festival, security was much tighter for the band as they performed alongside Santana. The festivities were peaceful, nearly 200 people were arrested for a variety of minor infractions.

At the conclusion of the tour on September 2, 1979, the band would take a bit of a rest before beginning work on their next album Departure. Despite the album and ticket sales they have made, the band were more received by British critics than the American critics. The band had expanded its operation to include a lighting and trucking operation for their future performances as the tour had grossed more than $5 million, making the band as popular as it had ever been in five years.

== Reception ==
John Quayle, who attended the Pittsburgh performance, stated in a review for the Observer-Reporter: "Primed by a hot Graham Parker and The Rumour, a near capacity crowd greeted Journey with open arms at the Stanley Theater and Journey responded very well, giving Pittsburgh a night of driving rock, sweetsung harmonies and a truly unforgettable performance." He concluded his review by stating that it was a 'fine concert', praising the setlist and noting on the approval of the audience.

== Tour dates ==
List of 1979 concerts
Date	City	Country	Venue
March 5, 1979	London	England	Hammersmith Odeon
March 6, 1979	London	England	Hammersmith Odeon
March 8, 1979	Hamburg	West Germany	Audimax
March 9, 1979	Cologne	West Germany	Sartory-Säle
March 10, 1979	Neunkirchen am Brand	West Germany	Hemmerleinhalle
March 12, 1979	Munich	West Germany	Deutsches Museum
March 13, 1979	Mannheim	West Germany	Rosengarten
March 15, 1979	Würzburg	West Germany	Frankenhalle
March 16, 1979	Offenbach	West Germany	Stadthalle
March 19, 1979	Paris	France	Le Stadium
March 21, 1979	Manchester	England	Manchester Apollo
March 22, 1979	Glasgow	Scotland	Apollo Theatre
March 23, 1979	Newcastle	England	Mayfair Ballroom
March 24, 1979	Sheffield	England	Sheffield City Hall
March 26, 1979	London	England	Hammersmith Odeon
March 27, 1979	Leicester	England	De Montfort Hall
March 28, 1979	Birmingham	England	Birmingham Odeon
April 2, 1979	The Hague	Netherlands	Congresgebouw
April 3, 1979	Sittard	Netherlands	Stadsschouwburg
April 5, 1979	Copenhagen	Denmark	Tivoli
April 7, 1979	Stockholm	Sweden	Konserthuset
April 12, 1979	Nagoya	Japan	Nagoya Kokai-do
April 14, 1979	Osaka	Japan	Koseinenkin Hall
April 15, 1979	Tokyo	Japan	Shibuya Kokai-do
April 16, 1979	Osaka	Japan	Koseinenkin Hall
April 18, 1979	Tokyo	Japan	Shibuya Kokai-do
May 2, 1979	Medford	United States	Jackson County Fairgrounds
May 3, 1979	Eugene	United States	McArthur Court
May 4, 1979	Seattle	United States	Seattle Center Arena
May 5, 1979	Portland	United States	Paramount Theatre
May 6, 1979	Boise	United States	Fairgrounds Exposition Building
May 8, 1979	Salt Lake City	United States	Terrace Ballroom
May 9, 1979	Denver	United States	Rainbow Music Hall
May 10, 1979	Denver	United States	Rainbow Music Hall
May 11, 1979	Kansas City	United States	Memorial Hall
May 12, 1979	Kansas City	United States	Memorial Hall
May 13, 1979	St. Louis	United States	Kiel Auditorium
May 14, 1979	Bloomington	United States	Metropolitan Sports Center
May 15, 1979	Milwaukee	United States	Milwaukee Auditorium
May 16, 1979	Chicago	United States	Aragon Ballroom
May 17, 1979	Chicago	United States	Aragon Ballroom
May 18, 1979	Chicago	United States	Aragon Ballroom
May 19, 1979	Chicago	United States	Aragon Ballroom
May 20, 1979	Chicago	United States	Aragon Ballroom
May 22, 1979	Toledo	United States	Toledo Sports Arena
May 23, 1979	Detroit	United States	Cobo Arena
May 24, 1979	Detroit	United States	Cobo Arena
May 25, 1979	Port Huron	United States	McMorran Arena
May 26, 1979	Toledo	United States	Toledo Sports Arena
May 27, 1979	Columbus	United States	Veterans Memorial Auditorium
May 28, 1979	Flint	United States	IMA Auditorium
May 29, 1979	Detroit	United States	Cobo Arena
May 30, 1979	Cleveland	United States	Public Auditorium
May 31, 1979	Cincinnati	United States	University of Cincinnati
June 1, 1979	Buffalo	United States	Shea's Performing Arts Center
June 2, 1979	Pittsburgh	United States	Stanley Theater
June 3, 1979	Syracuse	United States	Onondaga War Memorial Auditorium
June 4, 1979	Henrietta	United States	Dome Arena
June 5, 1979	Buffalo	United States	Shea's Performing Arts Center
June 6, 1979	Albany	United States	Palace Theatre
June 7, 1979	Portland	United States	Cumberland County Civic Center
June 8, 1979	Boston	United States	Orpheum Theatre
June 10, 1979	Passaic	United States	Capitol Theatre
June 12, 1979	Binghamton	United States	Broome County Veterans Memorial Arena
June 13, 1979	Columbia	United States	Merriweather Post Pavilion
June 14, 1979	Croton-on-Hudson	United States	Croton Point Park
June 15, 1979	Saratoga Springs	United States	Saratoga Performing Arts Center
June 16, 1979	Boston	United States	Orpheum Theatre
June 17, 1979	Shelton	United States	Pinecrest Country Club
June 19, 1979	Baltimore	United States	Baltimore Civic Center
June 20, 1979	Fort Worth	United States	Tarrant County Convention Center
June 21, 1979	Austin	United States	Municipal Auditorium
June 22, 1979	San Antonio	United States	HemisFair Arena
June 23, 1979	Houston	United States	Sam Houston Coliseum
June 24, 1979	Corpus Christi	United States	Memorial Coliseum
June 26, 1979	Albuquerque	United States	University Arena
June 27, 1979	Phoenix	United States	Arizona Veterans Memorial Coliseum
June 29, 1979	San Bernardino	United States	Swing Auditorium
June 30, 1979	Long Beach	United States	Long Beach Arena
July 1, 1979	Long Beach	United States	Long Beach Arena
July 2, 1979	Oakland	United States	Oakland-Alameda County Coliseum (Day on the Green 1979)
July 3, 1979	Oakland	United States	Oakland-Alameda County Coliseum (Day on the Green 1979)
July 4, 1979	Oakland	United States	Oakland-Alameda County Coliseum (Day on the Green 1979)
July 6, 1979	Reno	United States	Centennial Coliseum
July 12, 1979	Valley Center	United States	Kansas Coliseum
July 13, 1979	Tulsa	United States	Tulsa Assembly Center
July 14, 1979	Oklahoma City	United States	Myriad Convention Center
July 15, 1979	Little Rock	United States	Barton Coliseum
July 16, 1979	Kansas City	United States	Municipal Auditorium
July 17, 1979	Joplin	United States	Joplin Memorial Hall
July 18, 1979	New Orleans	United States	The Warehouse
July 19, 1979	Shreveport	United States	Hirsch Memorial Coliseum
July 21, 1979	St. Petersburg	United States	Bayfront Center
July 22, 1979	Miami	United States	Miami Jai-Alai Fronton
July 24, 1979	Atlanta	United States	Fox Theater
July 25, 1979	Nashville	United States	Nashville Municipal Auditorium
July 26, 1979	Memphis	United States	Mid-South Coliseum
July 28, 1979	Cleveland	United States	Cleveland Stadium (Worlds Series of Rock 1979)
July 29, 1979	Grand Rapids	United States	George Welsh Civic Auditorium
July 30, 1979	Saginaw	United States	Wendler Arena
August 1, 1979	New York City	United States	Wollman Skating Rink (Dr. Pepper Summer Music Festival 1979)
August 2, 1979	Springfield	United States	Hammons Center
August 3, 1979	Indianapolis	United States	Indiana Convention Center
August 4, 1979	St. Louis	United States	Checkerdome
August 5, 1979	Chicago	United States	Comiskey Park
August 6, 1979	Kalamazoo	United States	Wings Stadium
August 7, 1979	Madison	United States	Dane County Coliseum
August 8, 1979	East Troy	United States	Alpine Valley Music Theatre
August 10, 1979	Lansing	United States	Lansing Civic Center
August 11, 1979	Detroit	United States	Cobo Arena
August 12, 1979	Detroit	United States	Cobo Arena
August 13, 1979	Shelton	United States	Pinecrest Country Club
August 14, 1979	New York City	United States	Central Park
August 17, 1979	Las Vegas	United States	Convention Center
August 28, 1979	San Antonio	United States	HemisFair Arena
August 29, 1979	Corpus Christi	United States	Memorial Coliseum
August 30, 1979	Houston	United States	Sam Houston Coliseum
September 2, 1979	Oakland	United States	Oakland-Alameda County Coliseum

=== Box office score data ===
List of box office score data with date, city, venue, attendance, gross, references
Date (1979)	City	Venue	Attendance	Gross	Ref(s)
May 11	Kansas City, United States	Memorial Hall	6,528	$55,488	
May 12	Kansas City, United States	Memorial Hall	6,528	$55,488	
May 13	St. Louis, United States	Kiel Auditorium	10,586	$88,695	
July 4	Oakland, United States	Oakland-Alameda County Coliseum	—N/a	$632,684	
July 28	Cleveland, United States	Cleveland Stadium	—N/a	$834,690	

== Personnel ==
- Steve Perry – lead vocals, keyboards
- Neal Schon – guitars, backing vocals
- Gregg Rolie – keyboards, backing vocals
- Ross Valory – bass, backing vocals
- Steve Smith – drums, percussion
