= Walks Like a Lady =

Single by Journey

from the album Departure
- B-side: "People and Places"
- Released: May 1980
- Recorded: 1979
- Studio: The Automatt, San Francisco, California
- Length: 3:16
- Label: Columbia
- Songwriter: Steve Perry
- Producers: Geoff Workman; Kevin Elson

Journey singles chronology
"Any Way You Want It" (1980)	"Walks Like a Lady" (1980)	"The Party's Over (Hopelessly in Love)" (1981)

"Walks Like a Lady" is a song written by Steve Perry that was first released by his band Journey on their 1980 album Departure. It was also released as the second single from the album and reached No. 32 on the Billboard Hot 100. It also reached #31 in Canada.

== Music and lyrics ==
Ultimate Classic Rock described the writing of the song, saying that "Perry brought in a rough sketch, [Neal] Schon added a blues-inspired [guitar] riff, then [Steve] Smith picked up his brushes," and then [Gregg] Rolie added his "Hammond B3 groove."

Critics and the band have disagreed on the classification of "Walks Like a Lady". During concerts in 1980, Perry used to introduce the song by asking if anyone wants to hear the blues. Boston Globe correspondent Jim Sullivan, who described the song as "semi-blues" found the audience's confused reaction to that introduction humorous. Citizen's Voice critic Jerry Kishbaugh accepted the Perry's classification and described Journey's playing on the song as "blues at its best." Daily Record critic Jim Bohen completely rejected the notion of the song being the blues, stating that "of course the song has nothing to do with the blues."

Several critics have noted the similarity of the line "She walks like a lady / But she cries like a little girl" to the chorus from Bob Dylan's 1966 song "Just Like a Woman."

== Reception ==
Cash Box called "Walks Like a Lady" a "short, to-the-point, easy blues/pop track" with "finger lickin’ good blues [guitar] leads in a subdued but tasteful style" and "moodsetting organ work." Record World said of it that "Drawing from the infamous organ blues trios of another era, Journey adds some boogie rock with Steve Perry's vocals providing the pop front." The Morning Call critic Eric Hegedus described it as "lugubrious". Ultimate Classic Rock critic Nick DeRiso rated it Journey's all-time 22nd best song. '

"Walks Like a Lady" has been included on several Journey compilation albums, including the limited edition 3.0 version of The Essential Journey and Greatest Hits 2. It was also included on the 1981 live album Captured.
