= Infinity Tour =

1978 concert tour by Journey

- Tour by Journey
- Poster to the concert in Mannheim, West Germany
- Location: Europe; North America
- Associated album: Infinity
- Start date: January 20, 1978
- End date: December 31, 1978
- Legs: 3
- No. of shows: 127

Journey concert chronology
- Next Tour (1977); Infinity Tour (1978); Evolution Tour (1979)

The Infinity Tour was a concert tour by the American rock band Journey. The tour was in support of their 1978 album Infinity which peaked at #21 on the Billboard 200.

== Background ==
Sales for the album and the band's stature began to grow upon the beginning of the tour on January 20, 1978. Throughout March and April, the band would tour with both hard rock bands Van Halen and Ronnie Montrose who was touring with his first solo instrumental album, Open Fire. Steve Perry remembered: "Van Halen was the opening act for the tour, they were a brand new band back then. We were doing 3,000-seat auditoriums and they were killing us every night. It was eye-opening. We were keeping up with them, but they were certainly making us be a better band. They were so musically simple." Tom Broderick, a sound mixer for Van Halen recalled that the members of Journey were off-put by Van Halen's meteoric performances on tour with them and began to undermine them by sabotaging the PA.

The members of Journey would eventually end up meeting Montrose's drummer, Steve Smith, which released reports that there was tensions between Aynsley Dunbar and the band due to the change in music direction from the jazz fusion sound. Aynsley was also noted to have started playing erratically and talking derogatorily about the other members of Journey according to the band's manager Herbie Herbert. Reflecting on the tensions between Dunbar and the band, Neal Schon commented: "We would talk about it, and he'd say he'd be willing to simplify things. But we'd get out there, and after five shows he wasn't doing that at all."

The band would fly over to Europe to perform at the Pinkpop Festival in Holland. Critics who had watched the performance criticized the unfamiliar stage equipment, and called the performance 'shallow', commenting that Steve Perry's vocals were barely audible, and Aynsley's drum solo was 'clumsy' and 'boring'. Following the show in the Netherlands, the band embarked on a three-month tour, where they performed as headliners for the first time. As part of an artist development program by Columbia Records, the band would later perform a free concert to 33,000 fans at the performing arts center in Saratoga Springs on June 9.

The tour ended on September 2, 1978, which was the last time Aynsley Dunbar performed with the band. Montrose's drummer, Steve Smith, joined the band following Dunbar's departure. His first performance with Journey was in November at Super Jam II. The band later finished the year with a hometown gig on New Year's Eve with Blondie and Stoneground as supporting acts. It is one of their most successful tours to date, with notable performances like the show in Chicago with The Rolling Stones, the 1978 World Series of Rock Festival with Electric Light Orchestra and Foreigner, and the show in California with Ted Nugent and AC/DC.

== Reception ==
Reviewing the January 27–29 performances at the Old Waldorf, Jack McDonough noted the band as one of the most exciting English-influenced bands in San Francisco which was becoming extremely popular. He praised the band's sound as melodic, with an "enveloping rainbow feel", sounding almost a lot like both Queen and The Beatles, with a variety of songs from the album Infinity and the albums before. He took notice on the audience, which each show drawing out 3,600 fans.

== Tour dates ==
List of 1978 concerts
Date	City	Country	Venue
January 20, 1978	Chicago	United States	Riviera Theatre
January 27, 1978	San Francisco	United States	The Old Waldorf
January 28, 1978	San Francisco	United States	The Old Waldorf
January 29, 1978	San Francisco	United States	The Old Waldorf
February 10, 1978	Davis	United States	Freeborn Hall
February 12, 1978	Concord	United States	Concord Pavilion
February 17, 1978	Arcata	United States	East Gym
February 18, 1978	Salinas	United States	Sherwood Hall
February 19, 1978	Fresno	United States	Selland Arena
February 21, 1978	Stockton	United States	Stockton Memorial Civic Auditorium
February 24, 1978	Santa Barbara	United States	Arlington Theatre
February 25, 1978	Los Angeles	United States	Burt Sugarmans' Midnight Special (TV appearance)
February 26, 1978	Fresno	United States	Selland Arena
March 1, 1978	Racine	United States	Racine Memorial Hall
March 2, 1978	Davenport	United States	RKO Orpheum Theatre
March 3, 1978	Chicago	United States	Aragon Ballroom
March 4, 1978	Springfield	United States	Nelson Center
~~March 5, 1978~~	~~Indianapolis~~	United States	~~Indiana Convention Center~~
March 7, 1978	Madison	United States	Shuffle Inn
March 9, 1978	Milwaukee	United States	Riverside Theater
March 10, 1978	Detroit	United States	Masonic Temple Theater
March 11, 1978	Trotwood	United States	Hara Arena
March 12, 1978	Homestead	United States	Leona Theater
March 14, 1978	Toronto	Canada	Massey Hall
March 15, 1978	Cleveland	United States	Cleveland Music Hall
March 16, 1978	Columbus	United States	Columbus Veterans Memorial Auditorium
March 17, 1978	Louisville	United States	Louisville Gardens
March 18, 1978	Evansville	United States	Evansville Coliseum
March 19, 1978	South Bend	United States	Morris Civic Auditorium
March 20, 1978	Schaumburg	United States	B'Ginnings
~~March 21, 1978~~	~~Utica~~	United States	~~Utica Memorial Auditorium~~
March 22, 1978	Albany	United States	Palace Theatre
March 23, 1978	Buffalo	United States	New Century Theatre
March 24, 1978	Upper Darby Township	United States	Tower Theater
March 25, 1978	New York City	United States	Palladium
March 26, 1978	Hempstead	United States	Calderone Concert Hall
March 27, 1978	Boston	United States	Paradise Theater
March 29, 1978	Duluth	United States	Duluth Auditorium
March 30, 1978	Saint Paul	United States	St. Paul Civic Center Theater
March 31, 1978	Kansas City	United States	Memorial Hall
April 1, 1978	St. Louis	United States	Kiel Opera House
April 2, 1978	Omaha	United States	Omaha Music Hall
April 3, 1978	Wichita	United States	Pogo's
April 4, 1978	Tulsa	United States	Cain's Ballroom
April 5, 1978	Indianapolis	United States	Murat Temple Theater
April 6, 1978	Flint	United States	IMA Auditorium
April 7, 1978	Nashville	United States	War Memorial Auditorium
April 8, 1978	Murray	United States	MSU Field House
April 9, 1978	Birmingham	United States	Boutwell Memorial Auditorium
April 11, 1978	Corpus Christi	United States	Corpus Christi Memorial Coliseum
April 12, 1978	Austin	United States	Austin Municipal Auditorium
April 13, 1978	Shreveport	United States	Shreveport Memorial Auditorium
April 14, 1978	Fort Worth	United States	Will Rogers Memorial Auditorium
April 15, 1978	Houston	United States	Houston Music Hall
April 16, 1978	New Orleans	United States	The Warehouse
April 18, 1978	Memphis	United States	Ellis Memorial Auditorium
April 20, 1978	Tallahassee	United States	Ruby Diamond Auditorium
April 21, 1978	Pembroke Pines	United States	Hollywood Sportatorium
April 22, 1978	Tampa	United States	Curtis Hixon Hall
April 23, 1978	Atlanta	United States	Fox Theatre
April 25, 1978	Virginia Beach	United States	Rogues' Gallery
April 26, 1978	Virginia Beach	United States	Rogues' Gallery
April 27, 1978	Norfolk	United States	The Scope
April 28, 1978	New York City	United States	Palladium
April 29, 1978	Johnson City	United States	Freedom Hall Civic Center
April 30, 1978	Huntington	United States	Huntington Civic Center
May 1, 1978	Toledo	United States	Toledo Sports Arena
May 3, 1978	Cleveland	United States	Cleveland Music Hall
May 5, 1978	Rochester	United States	Rochester Community War Memorial
May 6, 1978	Boston	United States	Orpheum Theatre
May 10, 1978	Salt Lake City	United States	Salt Palace
May 11, 1978	Casper	United States	J Flag Indoor Arena
May 13, 1978	Boulder	United States	Folsom Field
May 15, 1978	Geleen	Netherlands	Burgemeester Damen Sportpark (Pinkpop 1978)
May 18, 1978	Tucson	United States	Tucson Convention Center
May 20, 1978	Long Beach	United States	Long Beach Arena
May 23, 1978	Seattle	United States	Seattle Center Arena
May 24, 1978	Portland	United States	Paramount Theatre
May 25, 1978	Spokane	United States	Spokane Coliseum
May 27, 1978	Medford	United States	Medford Armory
May 29, 1978	Concord	United States	Concord Pavilion
May 30, 1978	San Diego	United States	California Theater
June 9, 1978	Saratoga Springs	United States	Saratoga Performing Arts Center
June 10, 1978	Passaic	United States	Capitol Theatre
June 14, 1978	Upper Darby	United States	Tower Theatre
June 15, 1978	Pittsburgh	United States	Civic Arena
June 16, 1978	Saginaw	United States	Wendler Arena
June 17, 1978	Lansing	United States	Lansing Civic Center
June 18, 1978	Cincinnati	United States	Riverfront Coliseum
June 24, 1978	Toronto	Canada	Maple Leaf Gardens
June 30, 1978	Milwaukee	United States	Milwaukee County Stadium
July 1, 1978	Dallas	United States	Cotton Bowl (Texxas Jam 1978)
July 2, 1978	Houston	United States	The Summit
July 4, 1978	Orchard Park	United States	Rich Stadium
July 5, 1978	Milwaukee	United States	Henry W. Maier Festival Park
July 8, 1978	Chicago	United States	Soldier Field
July 9, 1978	Chicago	United States	Aragon Ballroom
July 11, 1978	Clinton	United States	Riverview Park
July 12, 1978	Detroit	United States	Cobo Arena
July 13, 1978	Nashville	United States	Municipal Auditorium
July 15, 1978	Cleveland	United States	Cleveland Stadium (World Series of Rock 1978)
July 16, 1978	Davenport	United States	Credit Island Park (Mississippi River Jam 1978)
July 17, 1978	La Crosse	United States	Mary E. Sawyer Auditorium
July 18, 1978	Seymour	United States	Outagamie County Fairgrounds
July 20, 1978	Tulsa	United States	Tulsa Assembly Center
July 21, 1978	Jackson	United States	Civic Center
July 23, 1978	Louisville	United States	Kentucky Fair and Exposition Center
July 25, 1978	Jackson	United States	Mississippi Coliseum
July 27, 1978	Springfield	United States	Springfield Civic Center
July 28, 1978	New Haven	United States	New Haven Veterans Memorial Coliseum
July 29, 1978	Binghamton	United States	Broome County Veterans Memorial Arena
July 30, 1978	Portland	United States	Cumberland County Civic Center
August 3, 1978	Indianapolis	United States	Market Square Arena
August 5, 1978	Tiffin	United States	St. John's Hollow
August 6, 1978	East Rutherford	United States	Giants Stadium
August 8, 1978	Chicago	United States	Navy Pier (ChicagoFest 1978)
August 9, 1978	St. Louis	United States	Kiel Auditorium
August 12, 1978	Honolulu	United States	Neal S. Blaisdell Arena
August 18, 1978	Sacramento	United States	California Exposition & State Fair
August 26, 1978	Anaheim	United States	Anaheim Stadium
September 2, 1978	Oakland	United States	[[Day on the Green|Oakland-Alameda County Coliseum^{1}]]1 (Day on the Green 1978)
September 2, 1978	San Mateo	United States	Monitro Studios
October 1, 1978	San Francisco	United States	The Automatt
December 31, 1978	Oakland	United States	Oakland-Alameda County Coliseum (Bay Area New Year's Eve 1978)

Information

- ^Note 1 Aynsley Dunbar's final performance with Journey.

=== Box office score data ===
List of box office score data with date, city, venue, attendance, gross, references
Date (1978)	City	Venue	Attendance	Gross	Ref(s)
February 21	Stockton, United States	Civic Auditorium	3,669	$25,109	
July 13	Nashville, United States	Municipal Auditorium	9,900	$70,364	
July 15	Cleveland, United States	Cleveland Stadium	60,505	$672,964	
July 25	Jackson, United States	Coliseum	10,116	$62,213	
July 27	Springfield, United States	Civic Center	9,789	$67,836	
July 28	New Haven, United States	Coliseum	10,590	$76,580	
July 30	Portland, United States	Cumberland County Civic Center	9,100	$67,950	
August 9	St. Louis, United States	Kiel Auditorium	8,050	$59,607	
December 31	Oakland, United States	Oakland-Alameda County Coliseum	12,988	$136,887	

== Personnel ==
- Steve Perry – lead vocals
- Neal Schon – guitars, backing vocals
- Ross Valory – bass, backing vocals
- Gregg Rolie – keyboards, lead and backing vocals
- Aynsley Dunbar – drums, percussion
- Steve Smith – drums, percussion
