= Captured (Journey album) =

- Cover art by Stanley Mouse

Live album by Journey
- Released: January 30, 1981
- Recorded: August 4 and 5, 1980 (Detroit); August 8, 1980 (Montreal); October 13, 1980 (Tokyo)
- Venues: Cobo Arena, Detroit; The Montreal Forum, Montreal; Kosei Nenkin Hall, Shinjyuku, Tokyo
- Studios: Fantasy Studios, Berkeley, California
- Genre: Rock
- Length: 70:04
- Label: Columbia
- Producer: Kevin Elson

Journey chronology
Dream, After Dream (1980)	Captured (1981)	Escape (1981)

Singles from Captured
- 1. "The Party's Over (Hopelessly in Love)" Released: February 14, 1981

Professional ratings
Review scores
Source	Rating
AllMusic	3/5 stars

Captured is the first live album by the American rock band Journey. It was released on January 30, 1981, on the Columbia Records label. The album reached No. 9 on the Billboard 200 albums chart and went on to sell two million copies.

This album was recorded during the band's Departure Tour in 1980. Tracks 1–4 were taken from a performance recorded at The Forum in Montreal, Quebec, Canada, on August 8, 1980. Tracks 5 and 6 were from the performance at the end of the tour in Koseinenkin Hall, Shinjyuku, Tokyo, Japan, on October 13, 1980, and tracks 7–16 came from two shows at Cobo Arena in Detroit, Michigan, on August 4 and 5, 1980. The song "Dixie Highway" had not previously been (nor was it subsequently) recorded on any Journey studio album. Closing the album is the lone studio track, "The Party's Over (Hopelessly in Love)", which was released as a single.

In the liner notes, the album is dedicated to AC/DC lead singer Bon Scott, who died in February 1980. Scott is referred to as "a friend from the highway," as AC/DC had supported Journey the previous year on their "If You Want Blood" tour.

This was the last Journey album for keyboard player and founder Gregg Rolie.

Record World called the single "The Party's Over (Hopelessly in Love)" a "shining testimony to the band's commanding stage presence."

== Track listing ==
All tracks written by Steve Perry and Neal Schon, except where noted.

Side one
No.	Title	Writer(s)	Length
1.	"Majestic" (pre-recorded instrumental)		0:40
2.	"Where Were You"		3:21
3.	"Just the Same Way"	Gregg Rolie, Schon, Ross Valory	3:36
4.	"Line of Fire"		3:18
5.	"Lights"		3:30
6.	"Stay Awhile"		2:17

Side two
No.	Title	Writer(s)	Length
7.	"Too Late"		3:41
8.	"Dixie Highway"		6:52
9.	"Feeling That Way"	Perry, Rolie, Aynsley Dunbar	3:14
10.	"Anytime"	Rolie, Roger Silver, Robert Fleischman, Schon, R. Valory	4:25

Side three
No.	Title	Writer(s)	Length
11.	"Do You Recall"	Rolie, Perry	3:22
12.	"Walks Like a Lady" (incl. Neal Schon guitar solo)	Perry	7:06
13.	"Lă Do Dā" (incl. Steve Smith drum solo)		7:02

Side four
No.	Title	Writer(s)	Length
14.	"Lovin', Touchin', Squeezin'"	Perry	5:09
15.	"Wheel in the Sky"	Schon, Fleischman, Diane Valory	5:01
16.	"Any Way You Want It"		3:40
17.	"The Party's Over (Hopelessly in Love)" (studio recording)	Perry	3:42

Note: this was not the full concert set list that was played during the tour. The missing songs include "Of a Lifetime", "Kohoutek", "Lovin' You Is Easy", "People and Places", "Patiently", "Opened the Door", "Precious Time", "I'm Cryin'", "Homemade Love", "Moon Theme" (intro to "Wheel in the Sky") and "Winds of March". "Majestic" is a recorded version played as the introduction of the band arriving on stage.

== Personnel ==
Journey

- Steve Perry – lead vocals
- Neal Schon – guitar, vocals
- Gregg Rolie – keyboards, vocals
- Ross Valory – bass, vocals
- Steve Smith – drums, percussion

Additional musicians

- Stevie "Keys" Roseman – acoustic piano and keyboards on "The Party's Over (Hopelessly in Love)"

Production

- Kevin Elson – producer, engineer, mixing, live sound
- Clifford Bonnell – live recordings assistant engineer
- Daniel Aumais – live recordings assistant engineer
- Guy Charbonneau – live recordings assistant engineer
- Akira Fukuda – live recordings assistant engineer
- Tom Suzuki – live recordings assistant engineer
- Wally Buck – studio recording assistant engineer
- Bob Ludwig – mastering

== Charts ==
Chart (1981)	Peak position
Canada Top Albums/CDs (RPM)	9
Japanese Albums (Oricon)	75
US Billboard 200	9

== Certifications ==
Region	Certification	Certified units/sales
United States (RIAA)	2× Platinum	2,000,000^{^}
^{^} Shipments figures based on certification alone.
