= Too Late (Journey song) =

1979 single by Journey

Single by Journey

from the album Evolution
- Released: December 1979
- Recorded: 1978
- Genre: Rock
- Length: 2:58
- Label: Columbia
- Songwriters: Steve Perry; Neal Schon
- Producer: Roy Thomas Baker

Journey singles chronology
| "Lovin', Touchin', Squeezin'" (1979) | "Too Late" (1979) | "Any Way You Want It" (1980) |

"Too Late" is a song by American rock band Journey and the third single from their fifth studio album, Evolution (1979). It was written by Steve Perry and Neal Schon.

Record World said that the song "takes the rock ballad to new limits with a call & response hookline and Neal Schon's dashing guitar break."

== Charts ==
| Chart (1980) | Peak position |
|---|---|
| US Billboard Hot 100 | 70 |
| US Cash Box Top 100 | 89 |
