= Anytime (Journey song) =

1978 single by Journey

Single by Journey

from the album Infinity
- Released: June 1978
- Recorded: 1977
- Genre: Hard rock
- Length: 3:28
- Label: Columbia
- Songwriters: Gregg Rolie; Roger Silver; Robert Fleischman; Neal Schon; Ross Valory
- Producer: Roy Thomas Baker

Journey singles chronology
"Wheel in the Sky" (1977)	"Anytime" / "Feeling That Way" (1978)	"Lights" (1978)

"Anytime" is a song by American rock band Journey and the second single from their fourth studio album, Infinity (1978). It was written by Gregg Rolie, Roger Silver, Robert Fleischman, Neal Schon and Ross Valory.

== Critical reception ==
Cash Box described the song as a "dynamic, irresistible effort that features exuberant, multi-tracked harmonies and potent lead guitar." Record World wrote of the song that "The a capella opening and high harmonies are guaranteed to catch the listener within seconds."

== Charts ==
Chart (1978)	Peak position
US Billboard Hot 100	83
US Cash Box Top 100	101
