= Any Way You Want It =

Single by Journey

from the album Departure
- B-side: "When You're Alone (It Ain't Easy)" (US, JPN); "Do You Recall (live) (UK 12"); "Lovin', Touchin', Squeezin' (live) (UK 12")
- Released: February 1980
- Recorded: 1979
- Studio: The Automatt, San Francisco, California
- Genre: Hard rock
- Length: 3:24
- Label: Columbia
- Songwriters: Steve Perry; Neal Schon
- Producers: Geoff Workman; Kevin Elson

Journey singles chronology
| "Too Late" (1980) | "Any Way You Want It" (1980) | "Walks Like a Lady" (1980) |

Music video
- "Any Way You Want It" on YouTube

"Any Way You Want It" is a song by American rock band Journey, released in February 1980 as the lead single from the band's sixth album Departure (1980). Written by lead singer Steve Perry and guitarist Neal Schon, it peaked at number 23 on the US Billboard Hot 100 chart.

The song also appears on all four of the band's live albums Captured, Greatest Hits Live, Live in Houston 1981: The Escape Tour, and Revelation on DVD. It remains a live staple for the band as well as a heavily rotated song on classic rock radio and a signature song for the band. The song appears briefly in the film Caddyshack, is featured as a multi-language acapella cover in Pitch Perfect 2, is performed in a mash-up with "Lovin' Touchin' Squeezin'" for the season one finale of Glee, is played at the end of "Burns, Baby Burns", an episode from The Simpsons season 8, and is featured briefly in "Fun and Games", an episode of the sixth season of Better Call Saul.

The song has additionally been used in promotional material for the action-comedy film The Fall Guy (which came out in May 2024), with the publication Collider.com describing the advertising as "classic rock" mixed in with "explosive action setpieces".

== Composition ==
According to Perry, the song was heavily influenced by Irish hard rock band Thin Lizzy and more particularly by bassist Phil Lynott. In July 1979, Journey were touring with Thin Lizzy across the United States when Lynott, Perry and Schon decided to share rhyme scheme exercises while they were hanging out in Miami. The "basic" work on "the guitar-vocal-guitar-vocal interchange thing that happened between Phil and his lyrics and the guitarist and his arrangements, inspired the 'Any Way You Want It' sorta give and take thing. It's guitar-voice, guitar-voice, more guitar-guitar-guitar-voice. It be voice-voice and back and forth and that's something that Neal and I think just instinctually picked up by hanging out with him", commented Perry. Schon and Perry would then rework on the song in the band bus, with Schon on acoustic guitar and Perry on vocals. Lynott's contribution later influenced other songs built on the same scheme such as "Stone in Love".

For the studio version, keyboardist Gregg Rolie originally used a Mellotron. Since it was defective, co-producer Geoff Workman decided to fix the sound by doubling it with Rolie's regular organ in the final mixing, thus creating the unique sounding background support for the song. This song is in the key of G major.

== Reception ==
Cash Box said that Journey has "tightened up the rhythm section" and that this song is paced by "short, smart drum shots and quick, choppy guitar licks." Record World said that it has "a soaring hook and guitar break."

== Music video ==
The music video was directed by Kim Paul Friedman and premiered in March 1980. It opens with a man standing in front of a jukebox, his face unseen by the camera. He scrolls his finger up a list of songs and stops at "Any Way You Want It". He then reaches into his pocket and pulls out a coin which he inserts into the jukebox. He then selects the song and we see a record being flipped over and beginning to spin. This dissolves into a shot of a studio tape spinning which leads to the group performing the song in the studio. The band's performance comprises most of the video until the song ends. At this point the man at the jukebox is revealed to actually be lead singer Steve Perry who turns and smiles at the camera. Another video exists which is a live performance during the Departure Tour. Both videos were omitted from the band's Greatest Hits 1978–1997 DVD in favor of another live version of the song from the Escape Tour.

== Personnel ==
Departure

- Steve Perry – lead vocals
- Neal Schon – guitars, backing vocals
- Gregg Rolie – Mellotron, organ, backing vocals
- Ross Valory – bass guitar, backing vocals
- Steve Smith – drums

Revelation

- Neal Schon – guitars, backing vocals
- Jonathan Cain – keyboards, backing vocals
- Ross Valory – bass guitar, backing vocals
- Deen Castronovo – drums, backing vocals
- Arnel Pineda – lead vocals

== Charts ==
| Chart (1980–1981) | Peak position |
|---|---|
| Canada Top Singles (RPM) | 50 |
| US Billboard Hot 100 | 23 |
| Chart (2010) | Peak position |
| UK Singles (Official Charts Company) | 161 |

== Certifications ==
| Region | Certification | Certified units/sales |
|---|---|---|
| New Zealand (RMNZ) | Platinum | 30,000^{‡} |
| United Kingdom (BPI) | Gold | 400,000^{‡} |
| United States (RIAA) | 4× Platinum | 4,000,000^{‡} |
^{‡} Sales+streaming figures based on certification alone.

== See also ==
- 1980 in music
- Hard rock music
- Journey discography
- List of songs in Glee (Season One)
