= Schon & Hammer =

American rock duo

- Origin: United States
- Genres: Pop, rock
- Years active: 1981–1982, 1998
- Label: Columbia
- Past members: Neal Schon; Jan Hammer; Glen Burtnik; Colin Hodgkinson; Steve Perry; Steve Smith; Ross Valory

Schon & Hammer was an American rock duo composed of composer/drummer/keyboardist Jan Hammer and guitarist Neal Schon. They released two studio albums, Untold Passion in 1981 and Here to Stay in 1982 and a collection entitled No More Lies in 1998. Hammer is best known for his soundtrack work on the Miami Vice TV series, and Schon as the guitarist from the band Journey. The duo's second album featured backing vocals by Journey's Steve Perry as well as contributions from former Journey drummer Steve Smith and bassist Ross Valory, and former Styx bassist Glen Burtnik. Each album received 3.5 out of 5 stars from AllMusic.

== Discography ==
- 1981: Untold Passion
- 1982: Here to Stay
- 1998: No More Lies
