= Stevie "Keys" Roseman =

Stevie Roseman
- Instrument: Keyboards
- Years active: 1966–present
- Formerly of: Journey

Stevie "Keys" Roseman (born Steve Roseman; January 29, 1951) is a keyboardist and performer born in Oakland, California. He has worked as a session and live musician since the late 1960s, most notably with the rock band Journey.

In between the departure of original keyboardist Gregg Rolie from Santana and the arrival of Jonathan Cain from The Babys he was invited to play keyboards on the track "The Party's Over (Hopelessly In Love)" on the 1981 live Journey release Captured. This same track appears on the package set Time³ and the 2001 compilation The Essential Journey.

He recorded several tracks with Journey guitarist Neal Schon on the 1999 "Piranha Blues" release and stayed close to the Journey family co-writing and recording the 2005 release VTR (Valory-Tickner-Roseman) with founders Ross Valory and George Tickner.

He also co-wrote the No Nation "Illumine" project in 2007 which includes guest artists such as vocalist Jon Anderson of Yes, bassist Ross Valory and keyboardist Mike Pinder of The Moody Blues.

Roseman continues to live and work in the Northern California Bay Area as an artist and performer.

== Discography ==
- With Journey: Captured (1981)
- With No Nation: Illumine (2007)

Preceded by Gregg Rolie	Journey keyboardist 1981	Succeeded by Jonathan Cain
