= Just the Same Way =

1979 single by Journey

Single by Journey

from the album Evolution
- Released: March 1979
- Recorded: 1978
- Genre: Rock
- Length: 3:18
- Label: Columbia
- Songwriters: Gregg Rolie; Neal Schon; Ross Valory
- Producer: Roy Thomas Baker

Journey singles chronology
"Lights" (1978)	"Just the Same Way" (1979)	"Lovin', Touchin', Squeezin'" (1979)

Music video
- "Just the Same Way" on YouTube

"Just the Same Way" is a song by American rock band Journey and the lead single from their fifth studio album, Evolution (1979). It was written by Gregg Rolie, Neal Schon and Ross Valory.

The song is built upon a piano riff and features layered harmony vocals recorded by Steve Perry and Rolie. Record World called the song a "hard but slick rocker."

== Charts ==
Chart (1979)	Peak position
Canada Hot 100 (Billboard)	80
US Billboard Hot 100	58
US Cash Box Top 100	63
