= Late Nite =

Studio album by Neal Schon
- Released: 1989
- Studio: Gush Studios (Oakland, California); Conway Studios (Hollywood, California); Fantasy Studios (Berkeley, California)
- Genre: Instrumental rock, hard rock
- Length: 57:56
- Label: Columbia
- Producer: Bob Marlette

Neal Schon chronology
Here to Stay - as Schon & Hammer (1982)	Late Nite (1989)	Beyond the Thunder (1995)

Late Nite is the first solo album by Neal Schon released in 1989. Bob Marlette played keyboards and produced the album. Several of the musicians were former Journey members Gregg Rolie, Jonathan Cain, Steve Smith, and Randy Jackson as well as future Journey members Deen Castronovo and Omar Hakim.

== Critical reception ==
Professional ratings
Review scores
Source	Rating
AllMusic	link
Guitar Nine	(not rated) link

In review of 24 June 1989 David Spodek of RPM, admitted that album showcases Schon's talent but the overall effect could be mixed. He wrote: "This sounds like nothing more than another Journey record, and may end up fading away fast with only die-hard Journey fans providing it with any support at retail."

== Track listing ==
1. "Le Dome" (instrumental*) (Schon, Marlette) - 1:07
2. "Late Nite" (instrumental) (Schon, Marlette) - 6:37
3. "Softly" (Schon, Marlette, Rolie, Burtnick) - 5:19
4. "The Theme" (instrumental*) (Schon, Marlette) - 9:41
5. "I'll Be Waiting" (instrumental*) (Schon, Marlette, Rolie) - 5:05
6. "I'll Cover You" (Schon, Burtnick, Marlette) - 5:56
7. "Rain's Comin' Down" (Schon, Cain, Marlette) - 7:06
8. "Smoke of the Revolution" (Schon, Cain, Spiro) - 4:45
9. "Inner Circles" (instrumental) (Schon, Marlette) - 4:38
10. "Steps" (instrumental) (Schon, Marlette) - 5:32
11. "Blackened Bacon" (Schon, Marlette, Newman) - 2:28

^{*}except for background vocals.

== Personnel ==
- Neal Schon – guitars, arrangements (1–7, 9, 10, 11), lead vocals (3, 6–8, 11), mandolin (11)
- Bob Marlette – keyboards (1–7, 9, 10, 11), arrangements (1–7, 9, 10, 11), harp (11)
- Jonathan Cain – keyboards (8), arrangements (8)
- Randy Jackson – bass guitar, backing vocals (8)
- Omar Hakim – drums (2, 6, 7, 9–11)
- Steve Smith – drums (3–5), percussion (7, 11)
- Deen Castronovo – drums (8)
- Pastiche – backing vocals (1, 3, 5–7)
- Lynn Mabry – scat (7)
- Margaret Taylor – scat (7)
- Sheryl Crow – backing vocals (8), vocal scats (8)
- Mark Spiro – backing vocals (8), arrangements (8)

Production

- Bob Marlette – producer, recording (1–7, 9–11), mixing (1, 2, 5, 11)
- Gary Wagner – mixing (1, 2, 5, 8, 11), recording (8), assistant engineer
- Kevin Elson – mixing (3, 4, 6, 7, 9, 10)
- Bryan Arnett – assistant engineer
- Chris Becker – assistant engineer
- Richard McKernon – assistant engineer
- Mark Newman – assistant engineer
- Marnie Riley – assistant engineer
- Tom Size – assistant engineer
- Bob Ludwig – mastering at Masterdisk (New York, NY)
- David Coleman – art direction
- Nancy Donald – art direction
- Randee St. Nicholas – photography
- Carolina Bagnarol – management
- John Griswold – guitar technician, studio crew
- Richard Bandoni – studio crew
- Laura Salazar – studio crew

== Sources ==
- Liner notes from the album.
