= Electric World =

Studio album by Neal Schon
- Released: July 15, 1997
- Studios: Warehouse 7 (Oakland, California)
- Genres: Fusion, hard rock
- Length: 112:42
- Label: Higher Octave
- Producer: Neal Schon

Neal Schon chronology
Beyond the Thunder (1995)	Electric World (1997)	Piranha Blues (1999)

Professional ratings
Review scores
Source	Rating
Allmusic	3/5 stars

Electric World is a double album by Neal Schon. It was released in 1997 on Higher Octave. In an ambient hard-rock laced world fusion style, the album is influenced by Carlos Santana.

== Track listing ==
All tracks composed by Neal Schon and Kit Walker, except where indicated.

1. "Night Spirit" (Igor Len, Schon) - 3:47
2. "N.Y.C." - 4:43
3. "Highway 1" - 4:29
4. "Electric World" - 6:03
5. "Gypsy Dance" - 6:15
6. "My Past Life" - 6:12
7. "Memphis Voodoo" - 4:50
8. "Breaking Waves" - 5:48
9. "Midnight Express" (Len, Schon) - 5:10
10. "Living Desert" (Schon) - 2:29
11. "The Dragon" - 7:22
12. "Medicine Man" - 4:57
13. "The Emperor" - 4:50
14. "Emerald Forest" - 5:38
15. "One and Only" - 6:56
16. "High Mileage" - 8:12
17. "Scram" - 5:09
18. "Mandolin Sky" (Schon) - 1:55
19. "Eye on the World" (Len, Schon) - 10:40
20. "All Our Yesterdays" (Len, Schon) - 3:33
21. "A Prayer for Peace" (Len, Schon) - 3:44

== Personnel ==
- Neal Schon – all guitars (1–9, 11–21), all instruments (10), mandolin (18)
- Igor Len – keyboards (1, 9, 19, 20, 21), synth bass programming (1, 9, 19, 20, 21), synth drums (1, 9), drum programming (19, 20)
- Kit Walker – keyboards (2–8, 11–17), bass programming (11), synth drums (11), synth bass programming (13, 16, 17), drum programming (16, 17)
- Alphonso Johnson – bass guitar (2–8, 12, 14, 15, 19)
- Walfredo Reyes Jr. – drums (2–8, 12–15, 19), percussion (2–8, 12–15)
- Steve Smith – drums (9, 21)
- Zakir Hussain – tabla (1, 9, 19), other East Indian percussion instruments (1, 9, 19)
- Michael Carabello – percussion (2–7, 12–15, 17, 19)

=== Production ===
- Matt Marshall – executive producer
- Dan Selene – executive producer
- Neal Schon – producer
- William Aura – associate producer
- Robert Allen Craft Jr. – engineer
- Richard DeSanto – mixing
- Fred Baysinger – mastering
- Ken Lee – mastering
- Rocket Lab (San Francisco, California) – mastering location
- Benjamin Cziller – art direction, design
- Murry Whiteman – digital imaging
- Joseph Quever – photography
- Irving Azoff – management
