= Voice (Neal Schon album) =

Studio album by Neal Schon
- Released: 2001
- Length: 48:00
- Label: Higher Octave Records
- Producer: Gary Cirimelli, David Foster

Neal Schon chronology
Piranha Blues (1999)	Voice (2001)	I on U (2005)

Professional ratings
Review scores
Source	Rating
allmusic	3.5/5 stars

Voice is a 2001 solo album by Journey guitarist Neal Schon. The album features instrumental versions of popular songs. It peaked at number 15 on Billboard's Top New Age album chart in the same year. In 2002, Voice was nominated for a Grammy Award for Best Pop Instrumental Album.

== Track listing ==
1. "Caruso" (feat. David Foster) (Lucio Dalla) (Produced by David Foster) - 5:40
2. "Hero" (Mariah Carey) - 4:49
3. "(Everything I Do) I Do It for You" (Bryan Adams) - 5:52
4. "Killing Me Softly" (Roberta Flack) - 5:03
5. "From This Moment On" (Shania Twain) - 5:07
6. "Why" (Annie Lennox) - 4:53
7. "I Can't Make You Love Me" (Bonnie Raitt) - 4:44
8. "Time to Say Goodbye (Con te partiro)" (Andrea Bocelli) - 4:11
9. "My Heart Will Go On" (Céline Dion) - 4:41
10. "A Song for You" (feat. David Foster) (Leon Russell) (Produced by David Foster) - 4:12

== Personnel ==
- Neal Schon – guitars
- Gary Cirimelli – keyboards, programming, acoustic rhythm guitar
- Scott Fuller – keyboards (1, 2, 4, 5, 7–9)
- David Foster – acoustic piano (1, 10)

Production

- Matt Marshall – executive producer
- Dan Selene – executive producer
- David Foster – producer (1, 10)
- Gary Cirimelli – producer (2–9), engineer, mixing, mastering
- Victor Bracke – photography
- Janet Wolsborn – art direction, design
