= Here to Stay (Schon & Hammer album) =

Studio album by Schon & Hammer
- Released: December 1982
- Recorded: Red Gate Studios, Kent, New York
- Genre: Pop; rock; jazz fusion
- Length: 38:46
- Label: Columbia
- Producer: Schon; Hammer

Schon & Hammer chronology
Untold Passion (1981)	Here to Stay (1982)	Neal Schon and Jan Hammer Collection: No More Lies (1998)

Professional ratings
Review scores
Source	Rating
Allmusic	3.5/5 stars

Here to Stay is the second album by the duo of composer Jan Hammer and guitarist Neal Schon. This album also featured contributions from Schon's bandmates in Journey including songwriting and background vocals from Steve Perry, notable as the only time Schon and Perry collaborated outside of Journey. The song "Self Defense" can be considered an unofficial Journey song as all members of Journey appear (though Jonathan Cain only contributed as a songwriter, instead of contributing keys).

The lead single "No More Lies" featured Schon on vocals and had a music video that was played on MTV.

The album cover is a play on the well known Arm & Hammer brand baking soda.

"Self Defense" would later be re-recorded for Journey's 2005 album Generations (under the title "In Self Defense"), with Schon taking lead vocal duties once again.

== Track listing ==
Side one

1. "No More Lies" (Neal Schon, Glen Burtnik, Jan Hammer) – 3:29
2. "Don't Stay Away" (Schon, Hammer) – 3:35
3. "(You Think You're) So Hot" (Hammer, Colin Hodgkinson) – 3:54
4. "Turnaround" (Hammer, Hodgkinson) – 4:48
5. "Self Defense" (Schon, Steve Perry, Jonathan Cain) – 3:13

Side two

6. "Long Time" (Hammer, Burtnik) – 3:50
7. "Time Again" (Hammer) – 4:55
8. "Sticks and Stones" (Schon, Hammer, Hodgkinson) – 3:15
9. "Peace of Mind" (Schon) – 2:10 (instrumental)
10. "Covered by Midnight" (Schon, Perry, Hammer, Hodgkinson) – 5:27

Bonus track on 2013 reissue

1. "Weekend Heaven" (Hammer, Hodgkinson) – 3:45

== Personnel ==
=== Musicians ===
- Neal Schon – guitars, guitar synthesizer, lead vocals
- Jan Hammer – drums, percussion, keyboards

Additional Personnel

- Glen Burtnik – backing vocals (tracks 1, 2, 7), harmony vocals (track 6), bass (track 1)
- Colin Hodgkinson – bass (tracks 3, 4, 6, 8–10)
- Steve Perry – backing vocals (track 5)
- Ross Valory – bass (track 5)
- Steve Smith – drums (track 5)

== Production ==
- Arranged and produced by Neal Schon and Jan Hammer
- Track 5 produced by Mike "Clay" Stone and Kevin Elson
- Recorded by Jan Hammer
- Mixed by Jan Hammer and Kevin Elson (at Fantasy Studios, Berkeley)
- Bob Ludwig – mastering at Masterdisk, New York
