= Dream, After Dream =

Studio album / soundtrack by Journey
- Released: December 10, 1980
- Recorded: October 13–22, 1980
- Studios: CBS/Sony Shinanomachi Studios, Tokyo, Japan
- Genre: Progressive rock
- Length: 35:22
- Label: Columbia
- Producers: Kevin Elson, Journey

Journey chronology
Departure (1980)	Dream, After Dream (1980)	Captured (1981)

Dream, After Dream, performed by the American rock band Journey, is the soundtrack album to the Japanese romantic fantasy film Yume, Yume No Ato (夢、夢のあと). Released in 1980 on Columbia Records, it was the seventh album-length recording by the group. The soundtrack firmly overshadowed the film itself, which enjoyed little fame. The album was a significant departure from the hard rock which characterized the band's three preceding albums, harking back to their progressive rock beginnings and relying on complex musicianship and instrumentals.

Dream, After Dream features a full vocal on three of its nine tracks, "Destiny", "Sandcastles" and "Little Girl". "Little Girl" was later released as the B-side of the "Open Arms" single and is featured on Journey's Time^{3} collection. It also appears as a bonus track on the 2006 reissue of Departure and the 2011 edition of Greatest Hits 2. "The Rape" is essentially an orchestral arrangement of "Conversations" from their debut album.

Dream, After Dream is the last studio album to feature founding member Gregg Rolie.

== Reception ==
Professional ratings
Review scores
Source	Rating
AllMusic	3/5 stars

Dream, After Dream has been viewed as a major departure from the commercially successful, radio-friendly pop of their previous three albums, instead harking back to their early, progressive rock-oriented work. AllMusic wrote, "One of the most overlooked albums in Journey's catalogue ... Dream, After Dream is a fine example of Journey's underrated musicianship, and recommended for devoted fans." Dave Marsh, normally an ardent detractor of the band, was even more enthusiastic, describing the album as "the band's finest recording of the 80's".

== Track listing ==
Side one
No.	Title	Writer(s)	Length
1.	"Destiny"	Steve Perry; Neal Schon	8:06
2.	"Snow Theme"	Ross Valory	4:12
3.	"Sandcastles"	Perry; Gregg Rolie	4:44
4.	"A Few Coins"	Rolie; Schon; Steve Smith; Valory	0:40

Side two
No.	Title	Writer(s)	Length
5.	"Moon Theme"	Perry; Schon	4:35
6.	"When the Love Has Gone"	Schon	4:02
7.	"Festival Dance"	Perry; Rolie; Schon; Smith; Valory	0:57
8.	"The Rape"	Valory	2:11
9.	"Little Girl"	Perry; Rolie; Schon	5:48
Total length:			35:22

== Personnel ==
Band members

- Steve Perry – lead and backing vocals, producer
- Neal Schon – guitars, vocals, producer
- Gregg Rolie – keyboards, harmonica, producer
- Ross Valory – bass, piano, recorder, producer
- Steve Smith – drums, percussion, producer

Additional musicians

- Eiji Arai, Yasuo Hirauchi, Tadataka Nakazawa, Sumio Okada – trombones
- Toshio Araki, Yoshikazu Kishi, Kenji Yoshida, Takatoki Yoshioka – trumpets
- Takashi Fukumori, Hachiro Ohmatsu, Kiyoshi Ohsawa, Masatsugu Shinozaki – violins
- Hiroto Kawamura, Kazuo Okamoto – cellos
- Masayuki Yamashiro – horn
- Strings and horns arranged and conducted by Matthew A. Schon

Production

- Kevin Elson – producer, engineer, mixing
- Akira Fukada, Geoff Workman – engineers
