= Untold Passion =

Studio album by Schon & Hammer
- Released: November 1981
- Genre: Pop, rock, instrumental
- Length: 42:09
- Label: Columbia
- Producer: Neal Schon, Jan Hammer

Schon & Hammer chronology
Untold Passion (1981)	Here to Stay (1982)

Professional ratings
Review scores
Source	Rating
AllMusic	3.5/5 stars

Untold Passion is the debut album by Schon & Hammer. Hammer, a founding member of the Mahavishnu Orchestra, is best known for his soundtrack work on Miami Vice. Schon is the guitarist for the band Journey.

== Track listing ==
1. "Wasting Time" (Schon, Hodgkinson) 3:46
2. "I'm Talking to You" (Schon, Hodgkinson, Hammer) 4:54
3. "The Ride" (Hammer) 4:41 (instrumental)
4. "I'm Down" (Schon, Hodgkinson) 4:08
5. "Arc" (Hammer) 3:58 (instrumental)
6. "It's Alright" (Schon, R. Silver, Hodgkinson) 4:43
7. "Hooked on Love" (Hodgkinson, Hammer) 3:06
8. "On the Beach" (Schon) 5:29 (instrumental)
9. "Untold Passion" (Hammer) 7:02 (instrumental)
10. (Bonus track in 2013 reissue) "Planet Empathy" (Hammer, Schon) 4:26 (instrumental)

== Personnel ==
- Neal Schon - guitars, synth guitar, vocals
- Colin Hodgkinson - bass guitar
- Jan Hammer - drums, keyboards, synthesizers

== Production ==
- Produced By Neal Schon & Jan Hammer
- Engineered By Jan Hammer
