= Beyond the Thunder =

Studio album by Neal Schon
- Released: March 30, 1995
- Recorded: Wild Horse Studio, Novato, CA
- Genre: Smooth jazz
- Length: 51:39
- Label: Higher Octave
- Producer: Jonathan Cain and Neal Schon

Neal Schon chronology
Late Nite (1989)	Beyond the Thunder (1995)	Electric World (1997)

Professional ratings
Review scores
Source	Rating
AllMusic	link

Beyond the Thunder is the second solo album by American guitarist Neal Schon released in 1995. This is his first album in six years on Higher Octave.

== Background and writing ==
Between the time in the early-to-mid-90s that Neal Schon played in the band Hardline and later reformed Journey, he released this album mixing fusion, world music and acoustic rock influences. Schon collaborated with many old friends including Jonathan Cain and Steve Smith from Journey, and Santana percussionists Chepito Areas and Michael Carabello.

In the liner notes Schon recalls the background on some of the songs including "Send Me an Angel" which is about his wife Dina. The unique wolf howl sound effects on "Call of the Wild" were created by Schon on guitar after listening to a tape Michael Carabello had recorded on a trip in Alaska. "Big Moon" contains Journey-esque melodies, as Cain and Schon used the original guitar from the Journey song "I'll Be Alright Without You" for the track's sound.

The track "Deep Forest" originated as an acoustic instrumental Schon would perform live in concert with Hardline. As he described "I had all these bits and pieces that I had played over the years that I just love. And so "Deep Forest" is a composed version of what I used to do when I was improvising on stage.". The viola parts of this arrangement were played on keyboard by Schon and according to Cain the first take of the song was used for the album.

As a footnote, the album's liner notes contained a shout-out to Journey's former lead singer Steve Perry when Schon commented "I think Steve Perry is going to like this record." The comment may have been a response to words in Perry's song "Anyway" from his 1994 album For the Love of Strange Medicine, which recalled his time together with his "brothers" in Journey. Within one year, Schon and Perry would reunite Journey to release Trial by Fire in 1996.

== Track listing ==
All songs written by Schon & Cain unless noted:

1. "Big Moon" (instrumental) – 4:54
2. "Bandalero" (instrumental) – 4:47
3. "Cool Breeze" (instrumental) – 4:55
4. "Zanzibar" (instrumental) – 5:09
5. "Send Me an Angel" (instrumental) – 5:06
6. "Boulevard of Dreams" (instrumental) – 4:15
7. "Espanique" (instrumental) – 4:28
8. "Caribbean Blue" (instrumental) – 4:36
9. "Someone's Watching Over Me / Iguassa Falls" (instrumental) (Schon) – 5:10
10. "Deep Forest" (instrumental) (Schon) – 2:52
11. "Call of the Wild" (instrumental) – 5:27

== Album credits ==
=== Personnel ===
- Neal Schon – electric guitars, acoustic guitars, guitar synthesizer, string arrangements
- Jonathan Cain – keyboards, string arrangements (10)
- Tony Saunders – bass (1, 3, 6)
- Billy Peterson – bass (2, 4, 5, 7–11), string arrangements
- Tommy Bradford – drums (1, 3, 6, 8–10)
- Steve Smith – drums (2, 4, 5, 7, 11)
- John "JH" Hernandez – percussion
- Michael Carabello – percussion (2, 7)
- José Areas – percussion (7)

=== Production ===
- Matt Marshall – executive producer
- Dan Selene – executive producer
- Neal Schon – producer
- Jonathan Cain – producer, engineer, mixing
- Dale Everingham – additional engineer
- Thomas Leukens – additional engineer
- Bob Ludwig – mastering at Gateway Mastering (Portland, Maine)
- Stan Slap – creative direction
- Geoff Gans – art direction, design
- Karen Miller – photography
- Dee Westlund – creative coordinator
- Tami Levy – project management
- Herbie Herbert Management and Bill Thompson Management – artist management
