= Departure (Journey album) =

- Cover art by Alton Kelley and Stanley Mouse

Studio album by Journey
- Released: February 29, 1980
- Recorded: November 5–12, 1979
- Studios: The Automatt, San Francisco
- Genres: Rock, hard rock
- Length: 37:49
- Label: Columbia
- Producers: Geoff Workman, Kevin Elson

Journey chronology
In the Beginning (1979)	Departure (1980)	Dream, After Dream (1980)

Singles from Departure
- 1. "Any Way You Want It" Released: February 1980; 2. "Walks Like a Lady" Released: May 1980; 3. "Good Morning Girl"/"Stay Awhile" Released: July 30, 1980

Professional ratings
Review scores
Source	Rating
AllMusic	3.5/5 stars
Rolling Stone	(favorable)

Departure is the sixth studio album by the American rock band Journey. It was released on February 29, 1980, by Columbia Records.

Departure was Journey's highest-charting album to that point, giving them their first appearance in the top 10 of the Billboard 200 album charts, peaking at No. 8. The album includes "Any Way You Want It", the leadoff track and top 25 single.

The album featured an edgier sound, thanks partly to the "live in studio" way the songs were recorded. The band went into The Automatt studio with 19 tracks, eventually trimming down to 12.

Three singles were released off Departure. "Any Way You Want It" reached No. 23 on the Billboard Hot 100 and the follow-up "Walks Like a Lady" reached No. 32. The last single was a medley of "Good Morning Girl" and "Stay Awhile" which only reached No. 55. Record World called the medley "an epic ballad" with "healthy amounts of pomp and bravado."

Departure would mark the last full-time studio album appearance of founding member Gregg Rolie, and his penultimate recording with the band: his final contributions would appear on Dream, After Dream, a soundtrack album to the Japanese film of the same name, which would also be released in 1980. Rolie had become tired of life on the road and decided to leave the band after assisting in the selection of his replacement, Jonathan Cain, then of The Babys. Rolie sang lead vocals on only one song on Departure, the ballad "Someday Soon".

In 1986, Columbia reissued Departure on compact disc in the U.S. and Europe. They subsequently remastered the album in 1996. BMG/Columbia remastered Departure again in 2006 for European, Japanese and American listeners, adding bonus tracks 13 "Natural Thing" and 14 "Little Girl". Dave Donnelly at DNA Mastering in New York City led the 2006 project.

== Track listing ==
All tracks are written by Steve Perry and Neal Schon, except where noted.

Side one
No.	Title	Writer(s)	Length
1.	"Any Way You Want It"		3:22
2.	"Walks Like a Lady"	Perry	3:17
3.	"Someday Soon"	Perry; Gregg Rolie; Schon	3:32
4.	"People and Places"	Perry; Schon; Ross Valory	5:05
5.	"Precious Time"		4:49

Side two
No.	Title	Writer(s)	Length
6.	"Where Were You"		3:01
7.	"I'm Cryin'"	Perry; Rolie	3:43
8.	"Line of Fire"		3:06
9.	"Departure"	Schon	0:38
10.	"Good Morning Girl"		1:44
11.	"Stay Awhile"		2:48
12.	"Homemade Love"	Perry; Schon; Steve Smith	2:54

2006 remaster bonus tracks
No.	Title	Writer(s)	Length
13.	"Natural Thing" (B-Side of "Don't Stop Believin'")	Perry; Valory	3:43
14.	"Little Girl" (from the soundtrack Dream, After Dream)	Schon; Perry; Rolie	5:47

== Personnel ==
Journey

- Steve Perry – lead vocals
- Neal Schon – guitars, co-lead vocals on "People and Places", backing vocals
- Gregg Rolie – keyboards, harmonica, co-lead vocals on "Someday Soon", backing vocals
- Ross Valory – bass guitar, bass pedals, backing vocals
- Steve Smith – drums, percussion

Production

- Geoff Workman – producer, engineer, mixing
- Kevin Elson – producer, live sound
- Ken Kessie – engineer
- Jim Welch – art direction

== Charts ==
Chart (1980)	Peak position
Canada Top Albums/CDs (RPM)	48
Japanese Albums (Oricon)	61
US Billboard 200	8

== Certifications ==
Region	Certification	Certified units/sales
United States (RIAA)	3× Platinum	3,000,000^{^}
^{^} Shipments figures based on certification alone.
