= Evolution (Journey album) =

- Cover art by Alton Kelley and Stanley Mouse

Studio album by Journey
- Released: March 20, 1979
- Recorded: October–November 1978
- Studios: Cherokee, Los Angeles
- Genre: Arena rock
- Length: 36:56
- Label: Columbia
- Producer: Roy Thomas Baker

Journey chronology
Infinity (1978)	Evolution (1979)	In the Beginning (1979)

Singles from Evolution
- 1. "Just the Same Way" Released: March 1979; 2. "Lovin', Touchin', Squeezin'" Released: June 1979; 3. "Too Late" Released: December 1979

Evolution is the fifth studio album by the American rock band Journey, released in March 1979 by Columbia Records. It is the band's first album to feature drummer Steve Smith.

It was the band's most successful album at the time, reaching No. 20 on the Billboard 200 chart, and has sold three million copies in the US. They retained Roy Thomas Baker (best known for his work with Queen) as producer, but drummer Aynsley Dunbar was replaced with Smith, formerly with Ronnie Montrose's band.

Evolution features their first top 20 hit, "Lovin', Touchin', Squeezin'", which reached No. 16 on the Billboard Hot 100. "Just the Same Way", which reached No. 58, featured original lead vocalist Gregg Rolie along with Steve Perry.

== Critical reception ==
Professional ratings
Review scores
Source	Rating
AllMusic	4.5/5 stars
Collector's Guide to Heavy Metal	7/10
The Rolling Stone Album Guide	2/5 stars

Record World said that the single "Too Late" "takes the rock ballad to new limits with a call & response hookline and Neal Schon's dashing guitar break." The magazine called "Just the Same Way" a "hard but slick rocker."

The Globe and Mail concluded that "all the songs here could well have originated at the same session as the numbers on the previous album, and that suggests stagnation."

== Track listing ==
Side one
No.	Title	Writer(s)	Length
1.	"Majestic" (instrumental)	Steve Perry; Neal Schon	1:16
2.	"Too Late"	Perry; Schon	2:58
3.	"Lovin', Touchin', Squeezin'"	Perry	3:51
4.	"City of the Angels"	Perry; Schon; Gregg Rolie	3:08
5.	"When You're Alone (It Ain't Easy)"	Perry; Schon	3:10
6.	"Sweet and Simple"	Perry	4:11

Side two
No.	Title	Writer(s)	Length
7.	"Lovin' You Is Easy"	Perry; Schon; Greg Errico	3:36
8.	"Just the Same Way"	Schon; Rolie; Ross Valory	3:18
9.	"Do You Recall"	Perry; Rolie	3:13
10.	"Daydream"	Perry; Schon; Rolie; Valory	4:41
11.	"Lady Luck"	Perry; Schon; Valory	3:35
Total length:			36:56

== Personnel ==
Journey

- Steve Perry – lead vocals
- Gregg Rolie – keyboards, backing vocals, co-lead vocals (track 8)
- Neal Schon – guitars, Roland GR-500 guitar synthesizer, backing vocals
- Ross Valory – bass guitar, Moog bass, backing vocals
- Steve Smith – drums, percussion

Production and design

- Roy Thomas Baker – producer, mixing
- Geoff Workman – engineer
- George Tutko – second engineer
- Greg Schafer – production manager
- Larry Noggle – package design
- Jim Welch – package design
- Alton Kelley – cover art
- Stanley Mouse – cover art
- Sam Emerson – back cover photography, liner photography
- Hiro Ito – liner photography
- Pat Morrow – liner notes

== Charts ==
Chart (1979)	Peak position
Canada Top Albums/CDs (RPM)	35
Japanese Albums (Oricon)	70
Swedish Albums (Sverigetopplistan)	36
US Billboard 200	20

Chart (1983)	Peak position
UK Albums (Official Charts)	100

== Certifications ==
Region	Certification	Certified units/sales
Canada (Music Canada)	Gold	50,000^{^}
United States (RIAA)	3× Platinum	3,000,000^{^}
^{^} Shipments figures based on certification alone.
