= Wheel in the Sky =

Single by Journey

from the album Infinity
- B-side: "Can Do"
- Released: March 1978
- Recorded: 1977
- Genre: Hard rock
- Length: 3:31 (single); 4:12 (album)
- Label: Columbia
- Songwriters: Robert Fleischman, Neal Schon, Diane Valory
- Producer: Roy Thomas Baker

Journey singles chronology
"Spaceman" (1977)	"Wheel in the Sky" (1978)	"Anytime" (1978)

"Wheel in the Sky" is a song by the American rock band Journey from their album, Infinity and released as its lead single in March 1978. It was written and composed by Robert Fleischman, Neal Schon, and Diane Valory.

== Background ==
At the time of the song's composition, the band had decided to follow a new direction into an edgier sound and began recording simple hard rock pieces with new lead vocalist Fleischman. He was replaced by Steve Perry once work on Infinity began in earnest. The song had started out as a poem titled "Wheels in My Mind", which had been written by Diane Valory, the wife of Journey bassist Ross Valory.

== Reception ==
Cash Box said it has "tight lick guitar work and effective lead and backing vocals".

"Wheel in the Sky" reached #57 on the Billboard Hot 100 in 1978, becoming Journey's first song to chart on the Hot 100, and also reached #45 on the Canadian RPM 100.

== Structure ==
The song opens with an instrumental that lasts for 28 seconds. Perry then sings the first verse, which is followed by the chorus, and the second verse with the chorus repeated once again. Neal Schon joins with a guitar solo which is filled with Perry's vocals. The chorus is repeated four times before the outro that closes the song.

== Lyrics content ==
The narrator of "Wheel in the Sky" describes the newly arrived winter, as he is lamenting not having been home "in a year or more." He is missing home and longing to return and reconnect with an unnamed woman, and he hopes that "she holds on a little bit longer." He sings forlornly of "running down [a] dusty road" and admits, "I can't take this very much longer."

Throughout the refrain, the narrator notes the "wheel in the sky" which "keeps on turning" and hence can be interpreted as Diane Valory's metaphor for the various twists and turns of the narrator's life on the road as he repeatedly emphasizes, "I don't know where I'll be tomorrow." Alternatively, the wheel in the sky has often denoted the sun, which "keeps turning" as the Earth rotates on its axis, with each successive turn marking the passage of another day, bringing one closer to an anticipated date or event—in this case, the narrator's reunion with the woman.

== Personnel ==
- Steve Perry – lead vocals
- Neal Schon – guitars, backing vocals
- Gregg Rolie – piano, organ, backing vocals
- Ross Valory – bass guitar, backing vocals
- Aynsley Dunbar – drums

== Chart performance ==
Chart (1978)	Peak position
Canadian RPM 100	45
South Africa (Springbok)	12
U.S. Billboard Hot 100	57
U.S. Cash Box Top 100	52

== Certifications ==
Region	Certification	Certified units/sales
United States (RIAA)	2× Platinum	2,000,000^{‡}
^{‡} Sales+streaming figures based on certification alone.
