= Infinity (Journey album) =

- Cover art by Alton Kelley and Stanley Mouse

Studio album by Journey
- Released: January 30, 1978
- Recorded: October–December 1977
- Studios: His Masters Wheels (San Francisco); Cherokee (Los Angeles)
- Genres: Rock; hard rock
- Length: 36:28
- Label: Columbia
- Producer: Roy Thomas Baker

Journey chronology
Next (1977)	Infinity (1978)	Evolution (1979)

Singles from Infinity
- 1. "Wheel in the Sky" Released: March 1978; 2. "Anytime" Released: June 1978 (US); 3. "Lights" Released: June 1978 (UK)

Infinity is the fourth studio album by the American rock band Journey, released in January 1978 by Columbia Records. It was the band's first album with vocalist Steve Perry and the last to feature drummer Aynsley Dunbar.

== Background ==
Looking for a stronger lead vocalist, Journey briefly enlisted Robert Fleischman and even recorded a few tracks with him, one of which, "For You", later appeared on the Time^{3} compilation album and Fleischman's solo album Perfect Stranger. Fleischman was soon replaced by Steve Perry. Fleischman would later resurface as the first singer of the glam metal band Vinnie Vincent Invasion.

In "Feeling That Way", Perry dueted with keyboardist Gregg Rolie, who sings lead vocals on "Anytime".

"Patiently" was the first song Perry and Neal Schon wrote together. Perry wrote the lyrics, in which he expresses the sadness of being on the road and away from home, while also expressing admiration for the band's fans, and Schon wrote the music for the song. Other popular singles included "Lights" and "Wheel in the Sky". The latter was co-written with temporary frontman Fleischman.

Journey's manager, Herbie Herbert, enlisted English producer Roy Thomas Baker to produce Infinity. Baker produced a layered sound approach, similar to his work with Queen, as demonstrated on tracks such as "Winds of March" (with help from engineer Geoff Workman). In addition, Baker's method of stacked harmonies, notable on several other albums he produced, became trademarks of Journey's sound. He achieved this by having each vocalist (usually Perry and Rolie, sometimes joined by Valory and/or Schon) sing each harmony part in unison. This had the effect of making three or four voices sound like more, and is notable on the songs "Feeling that Way" and "Anytime", which are often played in tandem consecutively on radio stations as presented on the album.

The addition of Perry gave the band a more mainstream sound, and helped Journey attain their highest chart success to date.

== Reception ==
Professional ratings
Review scores
Source	Rating
AllMusic	4/5 stars
Collector's Guide to Heavy Metal	8/10
The Rolling Stone Album Guide	2/5 stars

Cash Box said of the single "Anytime" that it is a "dynamic, irresistible effort that features exuberant, multi-tracked harmonies and potent lead guitar." Record World said of "Anytime" that "The a capella opening and high harmonies are guaranteed to catch the listener within seconds." The Globe and Mail deemed the album "one of the most unjustifiably ignored gems of 1978."

In John Franck's AllMusic review, he wrote that the album, "effectively cemented their rep as one of America's most beloved (and sometimes hated) commercial rock/pop bands." The changes to the band and its music allowed "each bandmember to play to his strength: Perry's soaring, whale of a voice, Schon's scorching fret work, and Gregg Rolie's subtle keyboard arrangements."

== Track listing ==
Side one
No.	Title	Writer(s)	Length
1.	"Lights"	Steve Perry; Neal Schon	3:11
2.	"Feeling That Way"	Perry; Gregg Rolie; Aynsley Dunbar	3:28
3.	"Anytime"	Rolie; N. Schon; Ross Valory; Roger Silver; Robert Fleischman	3:28
4.	"Lă Do Dā"	Perry; N. Schon	3:01
5.	"Patiently"	Perry; N. Schon	3:21

Side two
No.	Title	Writer(s)	Length
1.	"Wheel in the Sky"	N. Schon; Fleischman; Diane Valory	4:12
2.	"Somethin' to Hide"	Perry; N. Schon	3:27
3.	"Winds of March"	Perry; N. Schon; Rolie; Matt Schon; Fleischman	5:04
4.	"Can Do"	Perry; R. Valory	2:39
5.	"Opened the Door"	Perry; N. Schon; Rolie	4:37
Total length:			36:28

== Personnel ==
Journey

- Steve Perry – lead vocals
- Neal Schon – electric and acoustic guitars, backing vocals
- Gregg Rolie – keyboards, backing vocals, co-lead vocals (tracks 2, 3)
- Ross Valory – bass guitar, backing vocals
- Aynsley Dunbar – drums, percussion

Production and design

- Roy Thomas Baker – producer, mixing
- Geoff Workman – engineer
- John Golden – mastering
- Tommy Steele – design
- Alton Kelley – artwork
- Stanley Mouse – artwork
- Sam Emerson – photography
- Mark Linett – technician
- Greg Schafer – technician

== Charts ==
Chart (1978)	Peak position
Canada Top Albums/CDs (RPM)	22
Swedish Albums (Sverigetopplistan)	37
US Billboard 200	21

== Certifications ==
Region	Certification	Certified units/sales
Canada (Music Canada)	Gold	50,000^{^}
United States (RIAA)	3× Platinum	3,000,000^{^}
^{^} Shipments figures based on certification alone.
