= Geoff Workman =

British record producer

- Born: Geoffrey Workman; 21 September 1947; Liverpool, England
- Died: 21 January 2010 (aged 62); Aurora, Colorado, US
- Resting place: Newcomer Funeral Home & Crematory, East Metro Chapel
- Occupations: Musician; record producer
- Years active: 1958–2010
- Spouses: Christina Workman (m. 1997); Lauri Day Workman (m. ~1985); Ruth Batt
- Children: 5
- Musical career
- Genres: Rock; pop
- Instruments: Bass guitarist; keyboards; harmonica

Geoff Workman (21 September 1947 – 21 January 2010) was an English record producer and engineer, best known for producing and engineering albums for The Cars, Queen, Journey, Foreigner, Drivin N Cryin, Toto, Dokken, Mötley Crüe, Private Eye and Twisted Sister. In the late 1970s, he engineered several albums with Roy Thomas Baker, eventually leaving in the 1980s to become a full-time producer. He produced the band Secretz at Cherokee Studios with Darrahl Foley. Geoff called Denver, Colorado home during the 1990s, where he produced and engineered for bands such as the Hippie Werewolves, Dogs of Pleasure, Killian Dare and Strange Parade, as well as Logan out of Houston TX.

== Early life ==
Geoffrey Workman was born in a small household in Liverpool, Lancashire, United Kingdom. Geoff's father was Thomas Arthur Rose Workman, a drummer and a Naval Architect for the British. John Lennon, who was perhaps one of the more influential person(s) in his future music career, would occasionally eat dinner at his family's house in Liverpool. Geoff created a band during his early education called the "Feelgoods," who would play at small local venues. John, who was at that point a part of the Beatles, invited him to tour with them as the opening act. After asking his father, Geoff remembered Thomas saying, "If you don't do it, you'll regret it."

The tour bus, which was allegedly said to have arrived at Geoff's school, was a dramatic beginning to a long career. Starting their tour in Germany, the newly found Beatles and the young Feelgoods were moved quickly around in Hamburg due to several issues, including the termination of contract by one club owner. After several years of opening for bands, including at a popular club by the name of Reeperbahn, he returned to England to work in the studio, producing for other bands.

Upon finding a periodical that introduced the world of recording to him, he copied down the relevant details and applied for a job. on his first night, he was rejected, and had to sleep on a bench. The following day, he asked again, and they offered him a position, "swabbing toilets and bringing coffee," and he agreed. His first attempt at producing was as a fill in for an album released by King Crimson, working on their album, In the Court of the Crimson King and Lizard. Eventually, after working for Wessex Sound Studios for several years engineering orchestras, commercial jingles, and local projects, he got his "big break" through being offered the chance to produce Journey.
