= Steve Smith (drummer) =

American drummer (born 1954)

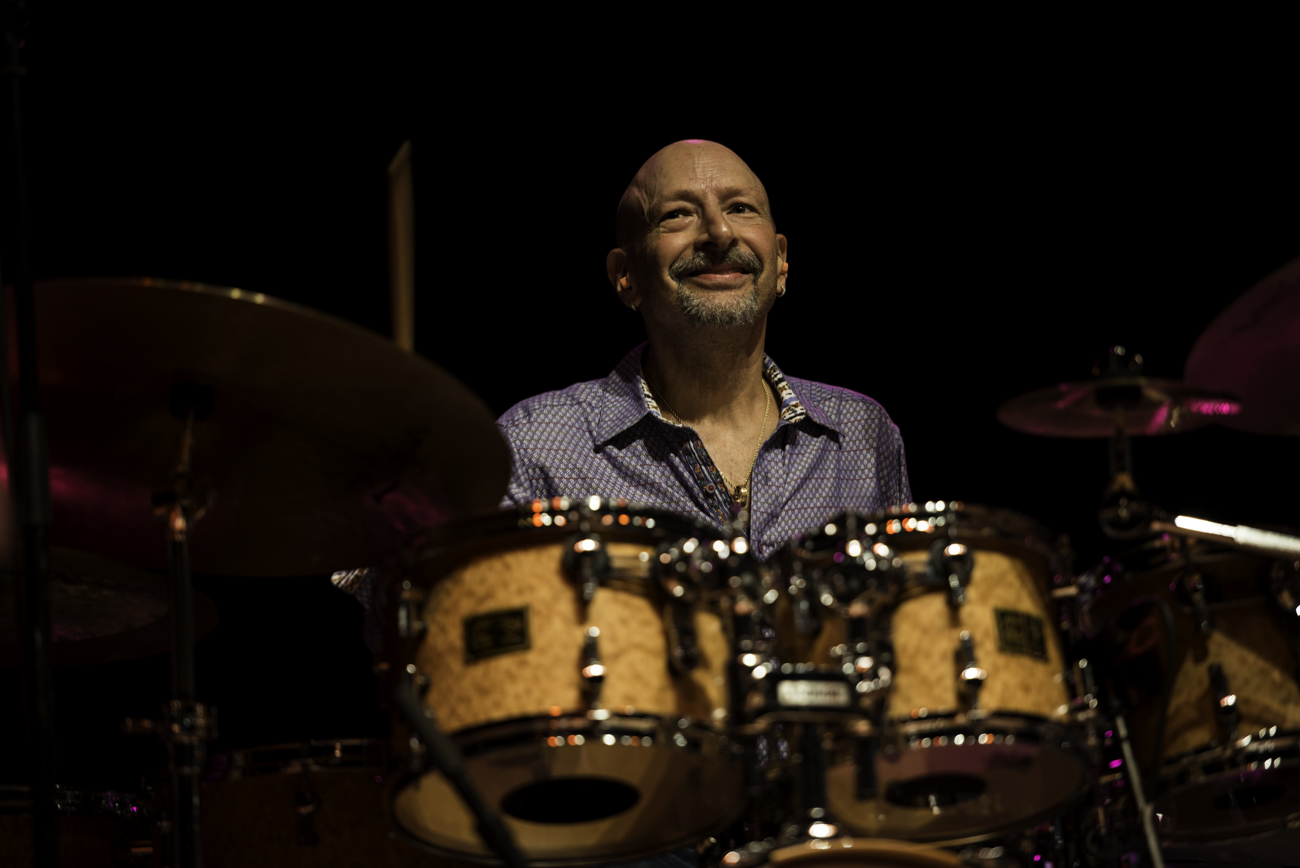
- Smith in 2013

Background information
- Born: Steven Bruce Smith; August 21, 1954 (age 72); Whitman, Massachusetts, U.S.
- Genres: Jazz; jazz fusion; rock
- Occupation: Drummer
- Years active: 1971–present
- Member of: Vital Information; Steps Ahead
- Formerly of: Journey; Mariah Carey; Jean-Luc Ponty; The RD Crusaders; Focus; Shaw Blades
- Website: vitalinformation.com

Steven Bruce Smith (born August 21, 1954) is an American drummer best known as a member of the rock band Journey across three stints: 1978 to 1985, 1995 to 1998 and 2015 to 2020. Modern Drummer magazine readers have voted him the No. 1 All-Around Drummer five years in a row. In 2001, the publication named Smith one of the Top 25 Drummers of All Time, and in 2002 he was voted into the Modern Drummer Hall of Fame. He was inducted into the Rock and Roll Hall of Fame as a member of Journey on April 7, 2017.

== Early life ==
Smith received his first drum kit at age two and in 1963 he began taking formal lessons with local Boston area drum teacher Bill Flanagan, who played in big bands in the swing era. Smith got his first "real" drum set when he was 12 years old. On many nights, Steve could be heard practicing in a small shed in the back yard of his Harvard Street home. Smith performed in the usual school band program and garage bands while in his teens, including Clyde, a South Shore sensation, but also began to broaden his performing experience by playing in a professional concert band and the big band at local Bridgewater State College.

== Career ==
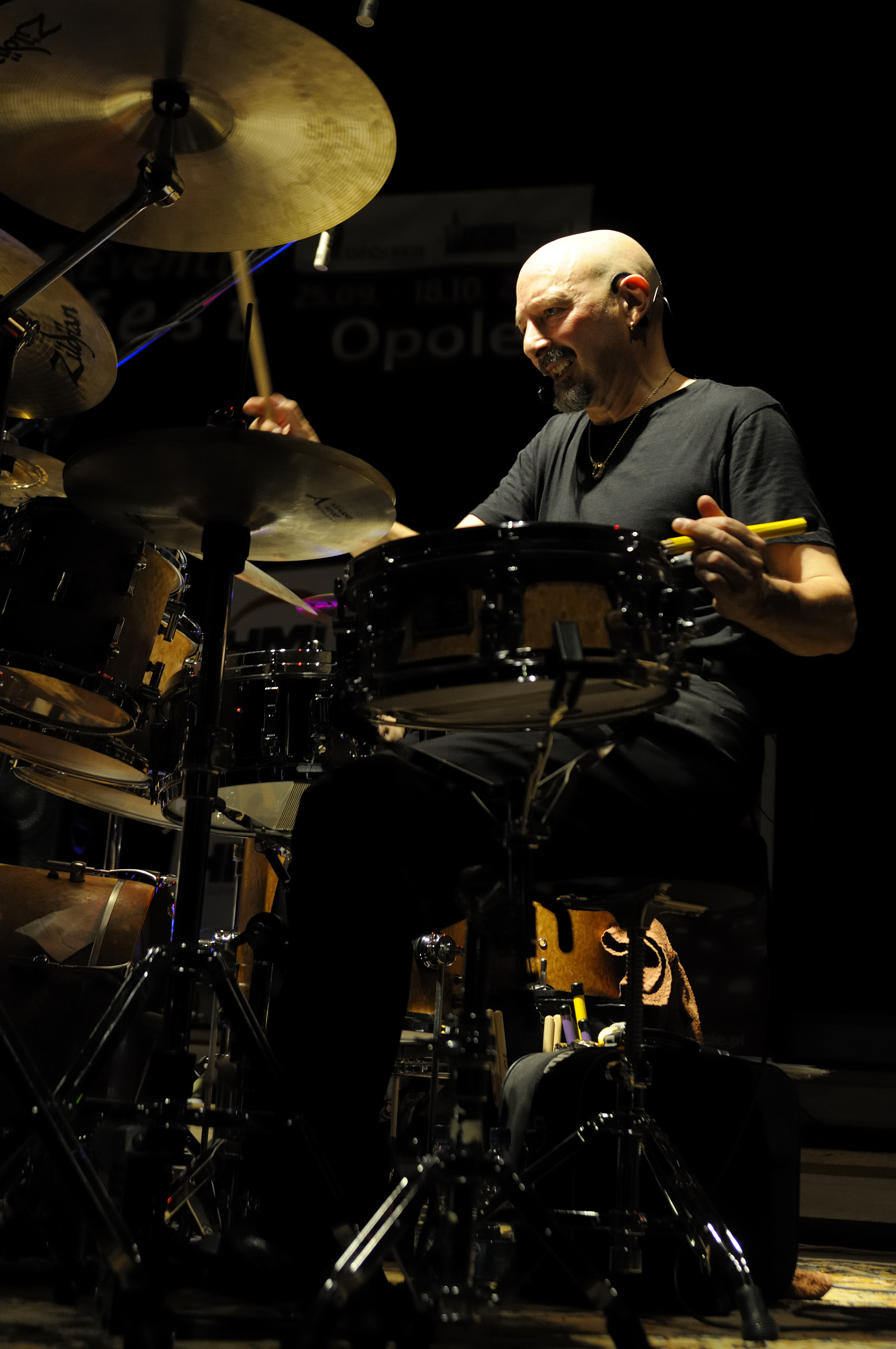
Smith in 2009

Smith graduated from high school in 1972, and at 19 he joined the Lin Biviano Big Band, playing with them for two years. After high school, Smith attended the Berklee College of Music and studied with Alan Dawson. In the early 1970s, he studied with Freddie Gruber. He recorded and toured with jazz violinist Jean-Luc Ponty in 1977–78. He was the drummer on the Focus album Focus con Proby (1978) and played with Ronnie Montrose. From 1978 to 1985, he was the drummer for the rock band Journey. He left the band in 1985 but returned in 1995 for the band's comeback album Trial by Fire. In the interim, he played with Journey offshoot the Storm. In 2015, he rejoined Journey again, but was terminated from the group (along with bassist Ross Valory) in March, 2020.

Since 1977, Smith has led his own jazz group, Vital Information. Drummer Neil Peart of Rush invited him in 1994 to perform on Burning for Buddy: A Tribute to the Music of Buddy Rich, a tribute album to Buddy Rich, who inspired both drummers. Smith recorded the song "Nutville" and was invited for the sequel tribute album, Burning for Buddy: A Tribute to the Music of Buddy Rich, Vol. 2, for which he recorded "Moment's Notice". He recorded two albums with Buddy's Buddies, a quintet composed of musicians who played with Rich. In 2007, Smith and Buddy's Buddies were renamed Steve Smith's Jazz Legacy. The band pays tribute to many great jazz drummers in addition to Buddy Rich. In 1989, Smith headlined the Buddy Rich Memorial Scholarship Concert held in New York City, performing a duet with drummer Marvin "Smitty" Smith. Smith released two albums, Very Live at Ronnie Scott's Set One & Set Two, for Tone Center, recorded at Ronnie Scott's club in London.

In 2001 Modern Drummer magazine named Smith one of the Top 25 Drummers of All Time. During the following year, he was voted into the Modern Drummer Hall of Fame. In 2003, his DVD Steve Smith Drumset Technique – History of the U.S. Beat was voted the No. 1 Educational DVD of the year.

Smith has worked as a session musician for Mariah Carey, Andrea Bocelli, Elisa, Vasco Rossi, Zucchero, Savage Garden, Bryan Adams, Zakir Hussain and Sandip Burman. Additionally, he has played with jazz musicians such as Steps Ahead, Wadada Leo Smith, Tom Coster, Ahmad Jamal, Dave Liebman, Larry Coryell, Victor Wooten, Mike Stern, Randy Brecker, Scott Henderson, Frank Gambale, Stuart Hamm, Dweezil Zappa, Anthony Jackson, Aydın Esen, Torsten de Winkel, George Brooks, Michael Zilber, Steve Marcus, Andy Fusco, Kai Eckhardt, Lee Musiker, Howard Levy, Oteil Burbridge, Jerry Goodman, Tony MacAlpine, Hiromi Uehara and Bill Evans.

== Equipment ==
Smith endorses Sonor drums, Remo drumheads, Zildjian cymbals, Vic Firth drumsticks and Drum Workshop hardware and bass drum pedals.

== Discography ==
=== As leader ===
- 1999 Steve Smith & Buddy's Buddies (Tone Center)
- 2003 Reimagined, Vol. 1: Jazz Standards (Bluejay)
- 2003 Very Live at Ronnie Scott's London, Set 1 (Tone Center)
- 2003 Very Live at Ronnie Scott's London, Set 2 (Tone Center)
- 2005 Flashpoint (Tone Center)

=== As member/co-leader ===
With Journey

- 1979 Evolution
- 1980 Departure
- 1980 Dream, After Dream
- 1981 Captured
- 1981 Escape
- 1981 Live in Houston 1981: The Escape Tour
- 1983 Frontiers
- 1986 Raised on Radio (tracks 2, 10, 11)
- 1996 Trial by Fire
- 1998 Greatest Hits Live
- 2017 Escape & Frontiers Live in Japan

With Vital Information

- 1983 Vital Information
- 1984 Orion
- 1987 Global Beat
- 1988 Fiafiaga
- 1991 Vitalive!
- 1992 Easier Done Than Said
- 1996 Ray of Hope
- 1998 Where We Come From
- 2000 Live Around the World
- 2001 Live from Mars
- 2002 Show 'Em Where You Live
- 2004 Come on In
- 2007 Vitalization
- 2012 Live! One Great Night (BFM Jazz)
- 2015 Viewpoint (BFM Jazz)
- 2017 Heart of the City (BFM Jazz)
- 2023 Time Flies (Drum Legacy)
- 2025 New Perspective (Drum Legacy)

With Steps Ahead

- 1986 Live in Tokyo 1986
- 1989 N.Y.C.
- 1992 Yin-Yang
- 2016 Steppin' Out

With Vital Tech Tones - with Scott Henderson and Victor Wooten

- Vital Tech Tones (Tone Center, 1998)
- VTT2 (Tone Center, 2000)

With Steve Smith's Jazz Legacy

- 2008 Live on Tour, Vol. 1
- 2009 Live on Tour, Vol. 2

With others

- 1987 Players with T. Lavitz, Jeff Berlin and Scott Henderson
- 1990 Ten (all tracks except 5, 8 & 11), Y&T
- 1990 The Storm, The Storm
- 1998 Cause and Effect with Larry Coryell and Tom Coster
- 2016 Groove: Blue with Tony Monaco and Vinny Valentino (Q-Rious)

=== As sideman ===
With Jeff Berlin

- 1985 Champion
- 1998 Crossroads

With Frank Gambale

- 1987 A Present for the Future
- 1991 Note Worker
- 1998 Show Me What You Can Do
- 2000 The Light Beyond
- 2002 GHS3

With Henry Kaiser and Wadada Leo Smith

- 2004 Yo Miles: Sky Garden
- 2005 Yo Miles: Upriver
- 2010 Yo Miles: Lightning
- 2010 Yo Miles: Shinjuku

With Neal Schon

- 1982 Here to Stay with Jan Hammer
- 1989 Late Nite
- 1995 Beyond the Thunder
- 1997 Electric World
- 2012 The Calling
- 2015 Vortex

With others

- 1977 Focus con Proby, Focus
- 1977 Enigmatic Ocean, Jean-Luc Ponty
- 1984 Reckless, Bryan Adams (appears on Heaven)
- 1986 Edge of Insanity, Tony MacAlpine
- 1989 Richie Kotzen, Richie Kotzen
- 1989 Metropolis, Turtle Island String Quartet
- 1991 Emotions, Mariah Carey
- 1994 Thonk, Michael Manring
- 1995 Spirito DiVino, Zucchero
- 1997 Pipes & Flowers, Elisa
- 1999 The Stranger's Hand, with Jerry Goodman, Howard Levy, and Oteil Burbridge
- 2000 Room Full of Fools, Kevin Coyne
- 2001 Count's Jam Band Reunion, Larry Coryell
- 2001 Defying Gravity, Vinnie Moore
- 2001 Chromaticity, Tony MacAlpine
- 2004 Andrea, Andrea Bocelli
