= Neal Schon =

American guitarist (born 1954)

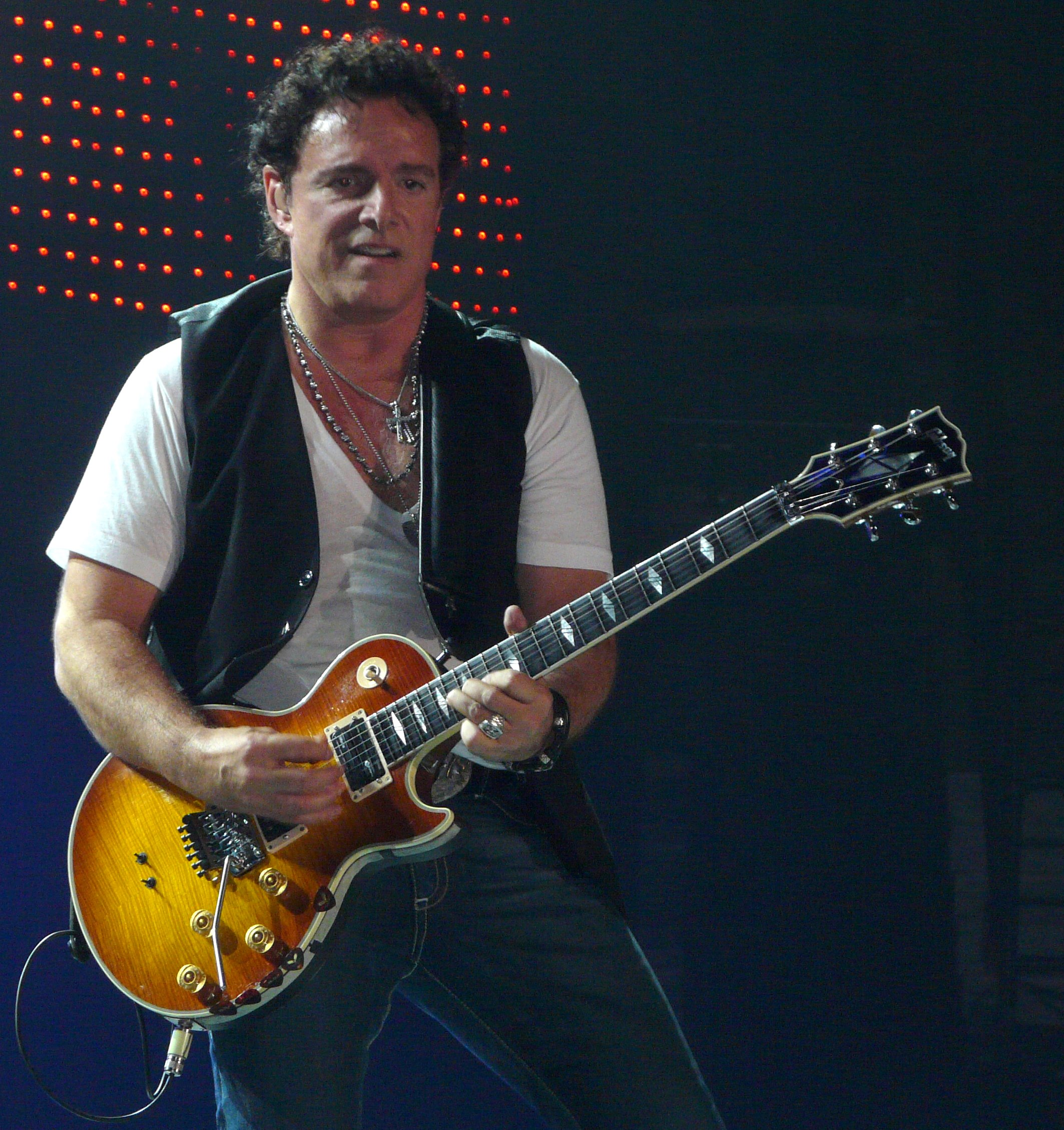
- Schon performing in 2008

Background information
- Born: February 27, 1954 (age 72); Tinker Air Force Base, Oklahoma, U.S.
- Genres: Hard rock; instrumental rock; progressive rock; jazz fusion; glam metal
- Occupation: Guitarist
- Years active: 1968–present
- Member of: Journey
- Formerly of: Santana; Azteca; Schon & Hammer; HSAS; Bad English; Hardline; Planet Us; Soul SirkUS
- Website: schonmusic.com

Neal Joseph Schon (/ʃɒn/; born February 27, 1954) is an American guitarist, best known as the co-founder and lead guitarist for the rock band Journey. He is the last original member to remain throughout the group's history. He was a member of the rock band Santana before forming Journey. He was also a member of the group Bad English during Journey's hiatus from 1987 to 1995, as well as an original member of Hardline.

Schon was inducted into the Oklahoma Music Hall of Fame in 2013, and into the Rock and Roll Hall of Fame as a member of Journey in 2017.

== Early life and career ==
Neal Joseph Schon was born at Tinker Air Force Base in Oklahoma, the son of Matthew and Barbara Schon. He is of German and Italian ancestry. His father was a big band musician, arranger, and composer, and played and taught all reed instruments with emphasis on jazz tenor saxophone; his mother was a big band singer. Schon started playing guitar at age 10. He attended Aragon High School in San Mateo, California, later dropping out to pursue his music career.

A quick learner, he joined Santana at age 17, in 1971. Schon has said he was asked by Eric Clapton to join Derek and the Dominos, but that he joined Santana instead, performing on the albums Santana III and Caravanserai. Schon also played in the band Azteca.

In 1973, he, Gregg Rolie and manager Herbie Herbert co-founded the Golden Gate Rhythm Section, which had later been re-named to Journey after a suggestion by roadie John Villaneuva.

Schon's guitar style is influenced by guitarists such as B.B. King, Albert King, Robert Johnson, Muddy Waters, John Lee Hooker, Jeff Beck, Eric Clapton, Carlos Santana, Jimmy Page and Peter Green.

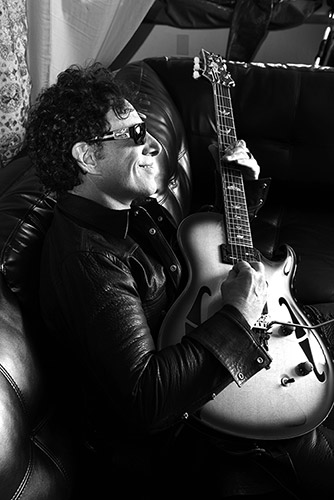
Schon in 2013

In addition to several solo albums and his work with Journey, Schon's work also includes: a pair of albums with keyboardist Jan Hammer, short-term collaborations with Sammy Hagar (HSAS and Planet Us) and Paul Rodgers, stints with Bad English (a supergroup that featured Journey's Jonathan Cain and Deen Castronovo and Cain's former Babys bandmates John Waite and Ricky Phillips) and Hardline (which also featured Castronovo). Even as Journey's latest lineup plays to a still-faithful body of fans, Schon has immersed himself in side projects such as Piranha Blues (1999); "Black Soup Cracker", a funk outfit that features former Prince associates Rosie Gaines and Michael Bland; and Soul SirkUS with Jeff Scott Soto.

Schon can be heard on other albums including three tracks on Michael Bolton's The Hunger, with the Schon sound most recognizable on "(Sittin' On) The Dock of the Bay". He also joined Larry Graham to play in an all-star band for cult funk artist and ex-wife of Miles Davis, Betty Davis. In addition, Schon (along with then Journey manager Herbie Herbert) also contributed to Lenny White's 1977 album Big City, specifically the instrumental jam "And We Meet Again".

On February 9, 2018, Schon played a charity show at San Francisco's The Independent, benefiting North Bay Fire Relief. The group recruited featured former Journey drummer Deen Castronovo (who also sang some of the vocals), former Journey keyboardist Gregg Rolie, and bassist Marco Mendoza of The Dead Daisies. The concert was released as a live album and DVD on May 19, 2023.

In 2019, Schon announced a tour to be called Neal Schon's Journey Through Time. The tour was stated to feature Castronovo, Rolie and Mendoza.

Schon played "The Star-Spangled Banner" on electric guitar for the opening game of the 2022 NBA Finals.

== Guitars ==
Schon's first guitar was an acoustic Stella, followed two years later by a Gibson ES-335. When the 335 was stolen, he replaced it with a '56 Les Paul Goldtop reissue that he used for many years. Schon has used Gibson guitars over the years, having also used Fender and Ovation guitars during Journey's Departure tour. He had a limited edition signature Les Paul model called the Neal Schon Signature Model Custom Les Paul, of which Gibson made only 35, according to the Gibson Custom website (80 according to Neal Schon's website). He has previously employed Godin guitars on his 1995 solo album Beyond the Thunder, and more recently uses Paul Reed Smith guitars. In the late 1980s, Schon manufactured (through Jackson Guitars and later Larrivee) and played his own line of guitars. Simply named Schon, about 200 of the Jackson-produced models were made.

As of 2008, Schon prefers guitar pedals from Xotic, a Vox Satriani model and occasionally uses a Buddy Guy wah pedal.

== Personal life ==
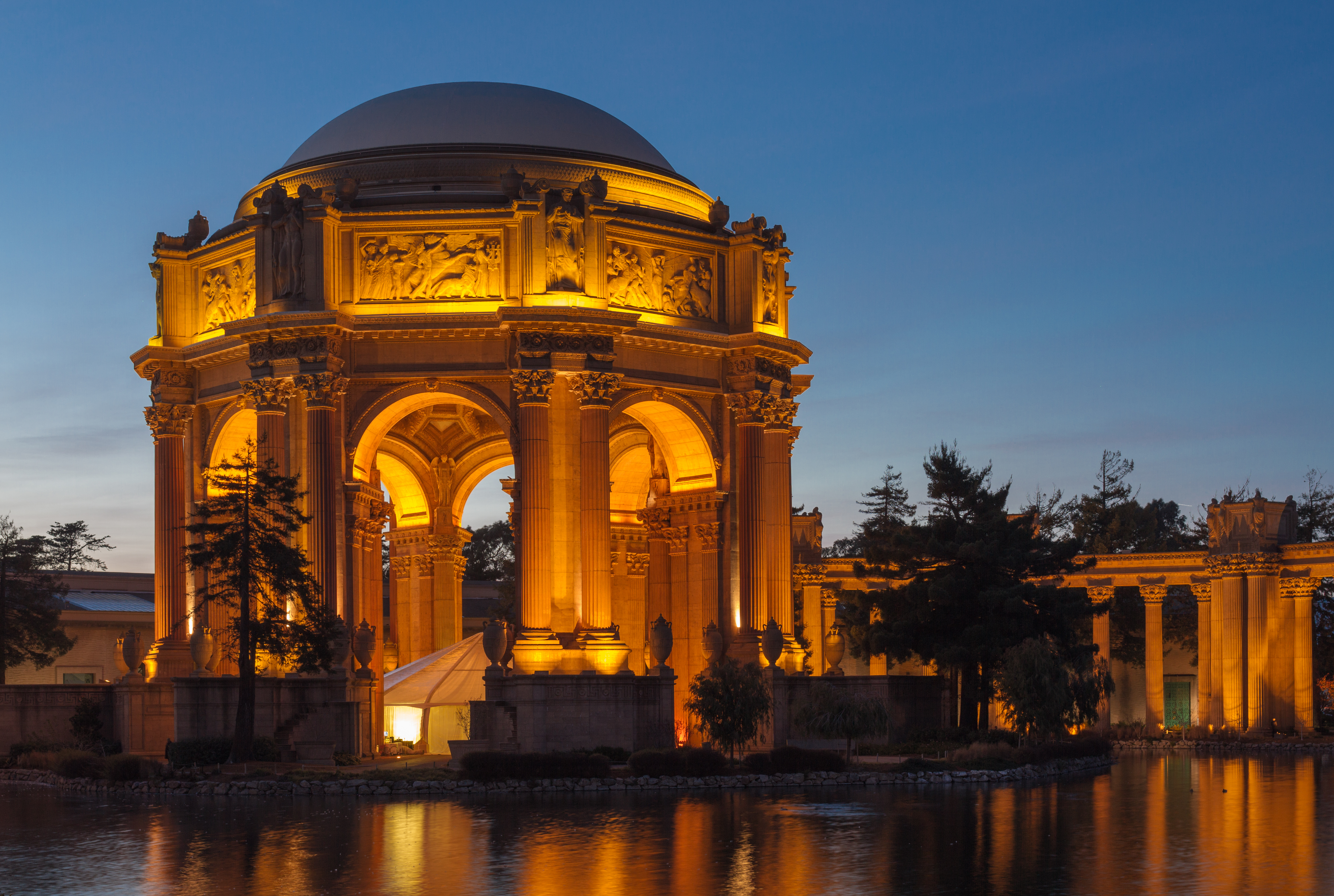
In December 2013, Schon married Michaele Salahi at the Palace of Fine Arts in San Francisco. A white tent (photo) had been erected in the rotunda for the occasion.

Schon's first marriage was to Tena Austin in 1976. After divorcing Austin in 1986, Schon married Beth Buckley a year later. They were together for approximately five years and had two children together. In 1993 he married Dina Gioeli, divorcing in 1999. In 2001, he married Amber Kozan, with whom he had two more children. They divorced in 2008. In September 2011, Schon publicly confirmed he was in a relationship with Michaele Salahi. The two said they had dated years previously in the 1990s. On October 14, 2012, Schon proposed to Salahi onstage during a charity concert at the Lyric Opera House in Baltimore, Maryland, offering her an oval 11.42 carat diamond engagement ring. The couple married on December 15, 2013, in a live broadcast wedding that was held in the Palace of Fine Arts in San Francisco, California.

Schon has confirmed that he has tinnitus, a constant ringing in the ears, common in musicians who have toured extensively.

== Discography ==
=== Solo albums ===
- Late Nite (1989)
- Beyond the Thunder (1995)
- Electric World (1997)
- Piranha Blues (1999)
- Voice (2001)
- I on U (2005)
- The Calling (2012)
- So U (2014)
- Vortex (2015)
- Universe (2020)
- Journey Through Time (2023)

=== with Santana ===
- Santana III (1971)
- Caravanserai (1972)
- Santana IV (2016)

=== with Azteca ===
- Azteca (1972)
- Pyramid of the Moon (1973)

=== with Journey ===
- Journey (1975)
- Look into the Future (1976)
- Next (1977)
- Infinity (1978)
- Evolution (1979)
- Departure (1980)
- Dream, After Dream (1980, Japanese movie soundtrack)
- Escape (1981)
- Frontiers (1983)
- Raised on Radio (1986)
- Trial by Fire (1996)
- Arrival (2001)
- Generations (2005)
- Revelation (2008)
- Eclipse (2011)
- Freedom (2022)

=== with Jan Hammer ===
- Untold Passion (1981)
- Here to Stay (1982)

=== with HSAS ===
- Through the Fire (1984)

=== with Bad English ===
- Bad English (1989)
- Backlash (1991)

=== with Hardline ===
- Hot Cherie EP (1992)
- Double Eclipse (1992)
- Can't Find My Way EP (1992)
- II (2002)

=== with Paul Rodgers ===
- Muddy Water Blues: A Tribute to Muddy Waters (1993)
- The Hendrix Set (1993)
- Now (1997; co-writer of "Saving Grace")
- Paul Rodgers & Friends Live at Montreux 1994 (2011)

=== with Just·If·I ===
- All One People (1991)

=== with Abraxas Pool ===
- Abraxas Pool (1997)

=== with Soul SirkUS ===
- World Play (2004)

=== Guest appearances ===
- Betty Davis – Betty Davis (1973)
- Robert Fleischman - Perfect Stranger (1979)
- Sammy Hagar - Danger Zone (1980)
- Tané Cain - Tané Cain (1983)
- Silver Condor - Trouble at Home (1983)
- Hear 'n Aid - Stars (1985)
- Gregg Rolie - Gregg Rolie (1985)
- Eric Martin - Eric Martin (1985; co-writer of "Just One Night")
- Joe Cocker - Cocker (1986)
- Gregg Rolie - Gringo (1987)
- Michael Bolton - The Hunger (1987)
- Jimmy Barnes - Freight Train Heart (1987)
- Glen Burtnick (ex Styx) - Heroes and Zeroes (1987)
- The Allman Brothers Band - Where It All Begins (1994; co-writer of "Temptation Is a Gun")
- Frederiksen/Phillips - Frederiksen/Phillips (1995)
- Fergie Frederiksen – Equilibrium (1999)
- Carmine Appice - Guitar Zeus - Safe (1996)
- Various artists - Merry Axemas, Vol. 2: More Guitars for Christmas (1998)
- Trichromes - Trichromes (2002)
- Jeff Scott Soto - Lost in the Translation (2004)
- Mickey Thomas - Over the Edge (2004)
- Beth Hart - "Les Paul & Friends: American Made World Played" (2005)
- Radioactive - Taken (2005)
- Sammy Hagar - Cosmic Universal Fashion (2008)
- Gary Schutt - Loss 4 Words (2008; guitar solo on "Road Trip")
- Lee Ritenour - Lee Ritenour's 6 String Theory (2010)
- Two Fires - Burning Bright (2011; co-writer of "Some Things Are Better Left Unsaid")
- Eric Martin - Mr. Rock Vocalist (2012)
- Sammy Hagar - Sammy Hagar & Friends (2013)
- Jimmy Barnes - 30:30 Hindsight (2014)
- Revolution Saints - Revolution Saints (2015)
- Jason Becker - Triumphant Hearts (2018)
- Steve Augeri - Seven Ways 'til Sunday (2022; co-writer of "Desert Moon")
- America's Got Talent - "Richard Goodall - finale performance" (2024)
