= List of Santana live performances (1960s–1970s) =

Santana is an American rock band, formed in 1966 by American guitarist Carlos Santana, which has performed for five decades.

The group's first concert tours were North America, with performances in Europe, where they performed at small and medium-size venues and rock festivals. Following a lineup change in early 1972, they toured the world from 1972 to 1973. During this tour, the band performed at arenas and theaters, while doing several concerts in South America, one of the first tours of the continent by a major American rock act. After a North American tour in 1974, the last remaining members of the group from their famous lineup, Michael Shrieve and José Areas, quit the group, and the band underwent multiple lineup changes during the following years. In the 1970s to the 1980s, the band played at arenas, but mostly theaters and seldom music festivals.

In the 1990s, the group lost their recording contract, but they continued to tour extensively throughout the decade, mostly playing at theaters and amphitheaters. However, the band ended the decade with the Supernatural Tour, a vehicle for their popular 1999 album Supernatural. The 177–date tour was a success with audiences and critics, and the group continued to perform within the 2000s. In the third quarter of 2010, Carlos Santana proposed to drummer Cindy Blackman after her solo on the song "Corazón Espinado", and she became an official member of the band in 2016. The group continues to tour the world to this day.

== 1967–68 performances (1967–1968) ==
Santana 1967–68 performances
- Tour by Santana
- Carlos Santana and Marcus Malone performing at the Los Altos High School Gym in Los Altos, California
- Start date: March 1, 1967
- End date: December 31, 1968
- Legs: 1
- No. of shows: 90 (approximately) (92 scheduled)

Santana concert chronology
- Santana 1967–68 performances; Santana Tour (1969–70)

Santana, then known as the Santana Blues Band, performed in 1967 and 1968 in many line-ups throughout the West Coast of the United States.

=== History ===
In January 1967, Carlos Santana was offered a slot by Bill Graham as an opener for an upcoming show at San Francisco's Fillmore Auditorium after Graham was impressed with Santana's performance with Paul Butterfield at the same venue in late January. In February 1967, his group, the Santana Blues Band, was officially formed when guitarist Tom Fraser invited Carlos Santana to jam with his friend Gregg Rolie, after seeing Santana play with Butterfield at the Fillmore. The band's first performance was on March 1, 1967, at The Ark club located inside a converted ferry boat in Sausalito, California. At the second show on March 17 at the Winchester Cathedral in Redwood City, California, the band was paid $75 for their performance, and allegedly, future drummer Michael Shrieve was in the audience at that show.

After a hiatus due to Santana being treated for tuberculosis, the group opened for the Who at the Fillmore on June 16 and 17, 1967, but the band was blacklisted from performing at the venue due to players Sergio "Gus" Rodriguez and Danny Haro showing up late for the gig on the 17th. In July, manager Stan Marcum made Santana remove Rodriguez and Haro from the band, and Haro was replaced by Bob Wehr for one performance at the Grant & Green jazz bar, where David Brown was asked to join after the performance. In November 1967, the band changed their name to Santana.

=== Live releases ===
Live material from these performances has appeared on the following:

- Songs from the band's shows from December 19 to 22, 1968 were released on the 1997 live album Live at the Fillmore 1968.
- A performance from 1968 was released as The Very Best of Santana – Live in 1968 in 2007.

=== Tour band ===
- Gregg Rolie – lead vocals, Hammond organ, piano
- Carlos Santana – lead guitar, percussion, vocals
- Tom Fraser – rhythm guitar (through August 1967)
- Sergio "Gus" Rodriguez – bass guitar (through July 1967)
- David Brown – bass guitar (beginning July 1967)
- Danny Haro – drums (through July 1967)
- Bob Wehr – drums (in July 1967)
- Rod Harper – drums (from July to November 1967)
- Bob "Doc" Livingston – drums (beginning November 1967)
- Michael Carabello – congas, percussion (to July 1967)
- Marcus Malone – congas, percussion (beginning July 1967)

=== Set list ===
The group's set list usually consisted of covers of Latin music and blues songs, such as Willie Bobo's "Fried Neckbones and Some Homefries" and Chico Hamilton's "Conquistadore Rides Again." The set list of the live album Live at the Fillmore 1968 consists of the following:

1. "Jingo" (Babatunde Olatunji)
2. "Persuasion" (Gregg Rolie)
3. "Treat" (Carlos Santana, Rolie, David Brown)
4. "Chunk a Funk" (Santana, Rolie)
5. "Fried Neckbones and Some Homefries" (Willie Bobo, Melvin Lastie)
6. "Conquistadore Rides Again" (Chico Hamilton)
7. "Soul Sacrifice" (Santana, Rolie, Marcus Malone, Brown)
8. "As the Years Go Passing By" (Deadric Malone)
9. "Freeway" (Santana, Rolie)

=== Performance dates ===
List of tour dates with date, city, country, venue
Date	City	Country	Venue
March 1, 1967	Sausalito	United States	The Ark
March 17, 1967	Redwood City	United States	Winchester Cathedral
March 30, 1967	San Francisco	United States	California Hall
March 31, 1967	San Francisco	United States	California Hall
June 16, 1967 (Note: The band opened for The Who on June 16, 1967. They were also supposed to open for them on the 17th, but they were blacklisted from performing there that date.)	San Francisco	United States	Fillmore Auditorium
~~June 17, 1967~~	San Francisco	United States	Fillmore Auditorium
June 23, 1967 (Note: The concert on June 23, 1967 was a part of the First Annual Synanon Street Fair.)	San Francisco	United States	Folsom Street & 7th Street
July 28, 1967	San Carlos	United States	Carlmont YMCA
November 10, 1967 (Note: The concert on November 10 and 29, 1967 was a part of the Peace & Freedom Party Rally.)	San Francisco	United States	55 Colton Street
November 17, 1967	San Francisco	United States	The Matrix
November 18, 1967	San Francisco	United States	The Matrix
November 19, 1967	San Francisco	United States	The Matrix
November 24, 1967 (Note: The concert on November 24, 1967 was a part of the Peace & Freedom Party Benefit Dance.)	San Francisco	United States	55 Colton Street
November 29, 1967	Fresno	United States	Fresno State Amphitheater
December 1, 1967	San Francisco	United States	Straight Theater
December 2, 1967	San Francisco	United States	Straight Theater
December 3, 1967	San Francisco	United States	Straight Theater
December 26, 1967 (Note: The concert on December 26, 1967 was a part of the 2nd Annual Grope For Peace.)	San Francisco	United States	Straight Theater
January 18, 1968	San Francisco	United States	The Matrix
January 19, 1968	San Francisco	United States	The Matrix
January 20, 1968	San Francisco	United States	The Matrix
January 26, 1968	Sausalito	United States	The Ark
January 27, 1968	Sausalito	United States	The Ark
January 30, 1968	San Francisco	United States	Straight Theater
January 31, 1968	San Francisco	United States	Straight Theater
February 1, 1968	San Francisco	United States	Straight Theater
March 1, 1968	San Francisco	United States	Straight Theater
March 2, 1968	San Francisco	United States	Straight Theater
March 20, 1968 (Note: The concert on March 20, 1968 was a part of the KMPX Strike Fund Benefit.)	San Francisco	United States	Avalon Ballroom
April 4, 1968	Los Altos Hills	United States	Foothill College
April 12, 1968	San Francisco	United States	Straight Theater
April 13, 1968	San Francisco	United States	Straight Theater
April 19, 1968	San Francisco	United States	Carousel Ballroom
April 20, 1968	San Francisco	United States	Carousel Ballroom
April 21, 1968	San Francisco	United States	Carousel Ballroom
May 7, 1968	San Francisco	United States	Straight Theater
May 8, 1968	San Francisco	United States	Straight Theater
May 9, 1968	San Francisco	United States	Straight Theater
May 10, 1968	San Francisco	United States	Straight Theater
May 11, 1968	San Francisco	United States	Straight Theater
May 17, 1968	San Francisco	United States	Avalon Ballroom
May 18, 1968	San Francisco	United States	Avalon Ballroom
May 19, 1968	San Francisco	United States	Avalon Ballroom
May 24, 1968	San Jose	United States	Balconades Ballroom
May 25, 1968	San Jose	United States	Balconades Ballroom
May 28, 1968 (Note: The concert on May 28, 1968 was a part of the Spring Medicine Show: A Benefit for the Haight-Ashbury Free Medical Clinic.)	San Francisco	United States	Avalon Ballroom
June 16, 1968 (Note: The concert on May 28, 1968 was a part of The Matrix Benefit.)	San Francisco	United States	Fillmore Auditorium
June 20, 1968	South Lake Tahoe	United States	The Sanctuary
June 21, 1968	South Lake Tahoe	United States	The Sanctuary
June 22, 1968	South Lake Tahoe	United States	The Sanctuary
June 28, 1968	San Francisco	United States	Avalon Ballroom
June 29, 1968	San Francisco	United States	Avalon Ballroom
June 30, 1968	San Francisco	United States	Avalon Ballroom
July 20, 1968	Winters	United States	Lake Berryessa Bowl
July 26, 1968	Sacramento	United States	The Sound Factory
July 27, 1968	Sacramento	United States	The Sound Factory
July 28, 1968 (Note: The concert on July 28, 1968 was a part of Stanford Summer Rock.)	Stanford	United States	Laurence Frost Amphitheater
July 30, 1968	San Francisco	United States	Fillmore West
July 31, 1968	San Francisco	United States	Fillmore West
August 1, 1968	San Francisco	United States	Fillmore West
August 9, 1968	San Francisco	United States	Avalon Ballroom
August 10, 1968	San Francisco	United States	Avalon Ballroom
August 11, 1968	San Francisco	United States	Avalon Ballroom
August 27, 1968	San Francisco	United States	Fillmore West
August 28, 1968	San Francisco	United States	Fillmore West
August 29, 1968	San Francisco	United States	Fillmore West
August 30, 1968 (Note: The concert on August 30, 1968 was a part of the Palace Of Fine Arts Festival.)	San Francisco	United States	Palace of Fine Arts
September 2, 1968 (Note: The concert on September 2, 1968 was a part of the Sky River Rock Festival and Lighter Than Air Fair.)	Sultan	United States	The Farm
September 12, 1968	San Francisco	United States	Fillmore West
September 13, 1968	San Francisco	United States	Fillmore West
September 14, 1968	San Francisco	United States	Fillmore West
September 21, 1968 (Note: The concert on September 21, 1968 was a part of the Autumn Rock Concert.)	San Jose	United States	Santa Clara County Fairgrounds
September 25, 1968 (Note: The concert on September 25, 1968 was a part of the Peace & Freedom Benefit For Cabaret.)	San Francisco	United States	Fillmore West
October 6, 1968	Berkeley	United States	Provo Park
October 18, 1968	Oakland	United States	St. Elizabeth High School
October 31, 1968	San Francisco	United States	Fillmore West
November 1, 1968	San Francisco	United States	Fillmore West
November 2, 1968	San Francisco	United States	Fillmore West
November 3, 1968 (Note: The concert on November 3, 1968 was a part of the Climax of the Autumnal Equinox.)	Fresno	United States	Selland Arena
November 13, 1968	San Francisco	United States	The Matrix
November 21, 1968 (Note: The concert on November 21, 1968 was a part of the L.A.H.S. Fall Concert.)	Los Altos	United States	Los Altos High School Gym
November 22, 1968	Moraga	United States	Campolindo High School
December 1, 1968 (Note: The concert on December 1, 1968 was a part of the Delano Benefit Concert.)	Los Altos Hills	United States	Foothill College
December 19, 1968	San Francisco	United States	Fillmore West
December 20, 1968	San Francisco	United States	Fillmore West
December 21, 1968	San Francisco	United States	Fillmore West
December 22, 1968	San Francisco	United States	Fillmore West
December 26, 1968 (Note: The concert on December 26, 1968 was a part of the Holiday Rock Festival.)	Daly City	United States	Cow Palace
December 28, 1968	Sacramento	United States	The Sound Factory
December 30, 1968	Fresno	United States	Rainbow Ballroom
December 31, 1968	San Francisco	United States	Winterland Ballroom

== Santana Tour (1969–1970) ==
Santana Tour
- Tour by Santana
- Associated album: Santana
- Start date: January 10, 1969
- End date: June 28, 1970
- Legs: 4
- No. of shows: 172 in North America; 8 in Europe; 180 in total

Santana concert chronology
- 1967–68 performances; Santana Tour (1969–70); Abraxas Tour (1970–71)

The Santana Tour was the first concert tour by the American rock band Santana, promoting their self-titled debut album.

=== History ===
1969 marked the first year Santana entered the mainstream, thanks to the group's appearance at the Woodstock festival, where drummer Michael Shrieve, aged 20, was one of the youngest musicians to play at the festival, and the success of their self-titled debut album. They performed nearly non-stop in the United States during that year, appearing at several large music festivals such as the Texas International Pop Festival and the Altamont Speedway Free Festival. During that year, the group's lineup was finalized, Carlos Santana on guitar, percussion, and vocals, David Brown on bass guitar, Gregg Rolie on Hammond organ and lead vocals, Michael Carabello on congas, José Areas on timbales, congas, and trumpet, and Shrieve on drums. In 1970, the group toured Europe (as well as playing at the Bath Festival of Blues and Progressive Music) and they played in Canada for the first time.

=== Live releases ===
Live material from this tour has appeared on a number of different releases:

- The group's set at the Woodstock festival on August 16, 1969, has appeared on the following releases:
  - The group's entire set was released on the 2008 box set The Woodstock Experience.
  - The group's whole set at the festival (minus "Evil Ways") was released on the 2004 Legacy Edition of Santana.
  - "Savor", "Soul Sacrifice", and "Fried Neck Bones and Some Homefries" was released on the 1998 reissue of Santana.
  - "Persuasion" and "Soul Sacrifice" was released on the 1988 compilation album Viva Santana!.
  - "Soul Sacrifice" saw release on the 1988 video Viva Santana! An Intimate Conversation With Carlos Santana. Additionally, the same song was released on the 1995 box set Dance of the Rainbow Serpent, the 1970 live album Woodstock: Music from the Original Soundtrack and More, and the 1970 film Woodstock.
- "Incident at Neshabur", "Soul Sacrifice", and "A Super Jam!" (with the Grateful Dead and Jefferson Airplane) from the show on February 4, 1970, was released on the 2005 video A Night at the Family Dog. Plus, "Incident at Neshabur" was released on the video Viva Santana! An Intimate Conversation With Carlos Santana.
- The band's performance in London on April 18, 1970, has appeared on the following releases:
  - "Se a Cabo", "Toussaint L'Overture", "Black Magic Woman", and "Gypsy Queen" were released on the 1998 remastered edition of Abraxas.
  - "Gumbo" and "Soul Sacrifice" were released on the 2001 video Legends of Rock: Live in Concert at the Royal Albert Hall.
- "Gumbo", "Savor", and "Jin-go-lo-ba" from the band's performance at the Kralingen Music Festival in the Netherlands was released on the 1971 film Stamping Ground and the live album of the same name.

=== Tour band ===
- Gregg Rolie – lead vocals, Hammond organ, piano, percussion
- Carlos Santana – guitar, percussion, backing vocals
- David Brown – bass guitar
- Bob "Doc" Livingston – drums (through March 15, 1969)
- Johnny Rae – drums (from March 21, 1969, to April 5, 1969)
- Michael Shrieve – drums (beginning April 1969)
- Marcus Malone – congas, percussion (through January 17, 1969)
- Michael Carabello – congas, percussion (beginning February 11, 1969)
- José Areas – timbales, congas, percussion, trumpet (beginning May 3, 1969)

=== Typical set lists ===
==== January 1969–April 1970: North American tour ====
Known as the Santana Blues Band up around March 1969, the band performed extensively during this tour, playing at mostly high schools, colleges, clubs, small music venues, fairgrounds, and large rock festivals such as Woodstock throughout. The tour began at January 10, 1969, at The TNT in Olympic Valley, California and ended on April 12, 1970, at the Fillmore East in New York City. A typical set list from 1969 was as follows (all songs written by the members of Santana unless specified otherwise).

1. "Waiting" (Carlos Santana)
2. "Evil Ways" (Clarence "Sonny" Henry)
3. "Savor"
4. "Treat"
5. "You Just Don't Care"
6. "Jin-go-lo-ba" (Babatunde Olatunji)
7. "Persuasion"
8. "Soul Sacrifice" (Santana, Gregg Rolie, David Brown, Marcus Malone)

A typical set list from 1970 (all songs written by the members of Santana unless specified otherwise) was as follows (actual set list taken from the first or second show on April 12):

1. "Se Acabó" (José Areas)
2. "Black Magic Woman" (Peter Green)
3. "Gypsy Queen" (Gábor Szabó)
4. "Savor"
5. "Jin-go-lo-ba" (Olatunji)
6. "Oye Como Va" (Tito Puente)
7. "Hope You're Feeling Better" (Rolie)
8. "Toussaint L'Overture"
9. "Evil Ways" (Henry)
10. "Persuasion"
11. "Soul Sacrifice" (Santana, Rolie, Brown, Malone)
12. "Treat"

==== April 1970: One show in England ====
On April 18, 1970, the band did one show in England for The Sound of the Seventies festival at the Royal Albert Hall in London, their first show in Europe and their first show outside North America. These are the songs known to have been performed there are (all songs written by the members of Santana unless specified otherwise):

1. "Se Acabó" (Areas)
2. "Toussaint L'Overture"
3. "Black Magic Woman" (Green)
4. "Gypsy Queen" (Szabó)
5. "Gumbo" (Santana, Rolie)
6. "Soul Sacrifice" (Santana, Rolie, Brown, Malone)

==== April–June 1970: Second North American tour ====
A short North American tour followed the gig in England, lasting from April 24, 1970, at the Memorial Hall in Allentown, Pennsylvania and ending on June 13, 1970, at the Capitol Theatre in Port Chester, New York. Taken from the show on May 22 at the Waikiki Shell in Honolulu, a typical set list from this tour was as follows (all songs written by the members of Santana unless specified otherwise):

1. "Se Acabó" (Areas)
2. "Black Magic Woman" (Green)
3. "Gypsy Queen" (Szabó)
4. "Savor"
5. "Jin-go-lo-ba" (Olatunji)
6. "Oye Como Va" (Puente)
7. "Toussaint L'Overture"
8. "Evil Ways" (Henry)
9. "Treat"
10. "Gumbo" (Santana, Rolie)
11. "Waiting" (Santana)
12. "Hope You're Feeling Better" (Rolie)
13. "Conquistadore Rides Again" (Chico Hamilton)

==== June 1970: European tour ====
The group embarked on a short, 8-date European tour in June 1970, which commenced on June 16, 1970, at the Royal Albert Hall in London, England and concluded on June 28, 1970, at the Bath Festival of Blues and Progressive Music at the Royal Bath and West Showground in Shepton Mallet, England. This set list is representative of the show on June 28. It does not represent all concerts for the duration of the tour.

All songs written by the members of Santana unless specified otherwise.

1. "Se Acabó" (Areas)
2. "Black Magic Woman" (Green)
3. "Gypsy Queen" (Szabó)
4. "Savor"
5. "Jin-go-lo-ba" (Olatunji)
6. "Oye Como Va" (Puente)
7. "Incident at Neshabur" (Alberto Gianquinto, Santana)
8. "Toussaint L'Overture"
9. "Evil Ways" (Henry)
10. "Persuasion"
11. "Soul Sacrifice" (Santana, Rolie, Brown, Malone)
12. "Gumbo" (Santana, Rolie)

=== Tour dates ===
==== North American leg (January 10, 1969 – April 12, 1970) ====
List of tour dates with date, city, country, venue
Date	City	Country	Venue
January 10, 1969	Olympic Valley	United States	The TNT
January 11, 1969	Olympic Valley	United States	The TNT
January 17, 1969	Santa Barbara	United States	Robertson Gymnasium
February 11, 1969	Woodside	United States	Woodside High School Gymnasium
February 13, 1969	San Francisco	United States	Fillmore West
February 14, 1969	San Francisco	United States	Fillmore West
February 15, 1969	San Francisco	United States	Fillmore West
February 16, 1969	San Francisco	United States	Fillmore West
February 21, 1969	Santa Barbara	United States	Earl Warren Showgrounds
February 25, 1969	San Francisco	United States	Fillmore West
February 28, 1969	Vallejo	United States	The Dream Bowl
March 1, 1969	Vallejo	United States	The Dream Bowl
March 1, 1969	Santa Barbara	United States	Earl Warren Showgrounds
March 7, 1969	San Jose	United States	James Lick High School
March 8, 1969	Fremont	United States	Washington High School
March 12, 1969	San Francisco	United States	Avalon Ballroom
March 14, 1969	San Jose	United States	Santa Clara County Fairgrounds
March 15, 1969	Pleasant Hill	United States	Diablo Valley College Gym
March 21, 1969	San Francisco	United States	Avalon Ballroom
March 22, 1969	San Francisco	United States	Avalon Ballroom
March 23, 1969	San Francisco	United States	Avalon Ballroom
March 26, 1969 (Note: The concert on March 26, 1969 was a part of Rockarama!!! 5 Days of Music at the Avalon Ballroom.)	San Francisco	United States	Avalon Ballroom
March 28, 1969	San Mateo	United States	CSM Gym
March 29, 1969	Las Vegas	United States	Las Vegas Ice Palace
April 1, 1969	Walnut Creek	United States	Las Lomas High School
April 3, 1969 (Note: The concerts on April 3–5, 1969 were a part of the Teen Expo '69.)	San Jose	United States	Santa Clara County Fairgrounds
April 4, 1969	San Jose	United States	Santa Clara County Fairgrounds
April 5, 1969	San Jose	United States	Santa Clara County Fairgrounds
April 11, 1969	Pasadena	United States	Rose Palace
April 12, 1969	Pasadena	United States	Rose Palace
April 18, 1969	San Pablo	United States	Contra Costa College Gym
May 3, 1969	Seattle	United States	Hec Edmundson Pavilion
May 9, 1969	Pasadena	United States	Rose Palace
May 10, 1969 (Note: The concert on May 10, 1969 was a part of the Pacific Pop Festival.)	Stockton	United States	Pacific Memorial Stadium
May 11, 1969	San Diego	United States	Aztec Bowl
May 15, 1969	San Francisco	United States	Fillmore West
May 16, 1969	San Francisco	United States	Fillmore West
May 17, 1969	San Francisco	United States	Fillmore West
May 18, 1969	San Francisco	United States	Fillmore West
May 24, 1969 (Note: The concerts on May 24–25, 1969 were a part of the Northern California Folk-Rock Festival II.)	San Jose	United States	Santa Clara County Fairgrounds
May 25, 1969	San Jose	United States	Santa Clara County Fairgrounds
May 28, 1969 (Note: The concert on May 28, 1969 was a part of the People's Park Bail Ball.)	San Francisco	United States	Winterland Ballroom
May 29, 1969 (Note: The concert on May 29, 1969 was a part of the Sounds of the City.)	Fresno	United States	Exhibit Hall
May 30, 1969 (Note: The concert on May 30, 1969 was a part of the Memorial Day Rock Festival.)	Merced	United States	Merced County Fairgrounds
June 10, 1969 (Note: The concert on June 10, 1969 was a part of the Palo Alto High School's graduation dance.)	Palo Alto	United States	Palo Alto High School
June 14, 1969	South Lake Tahoe	United States	The Fun House
June 20, 1969	San Francisco	United States	Fillmore West
June 21, 1969 (2 shows)	Salt Lake City	United States	Terrace Ballroom
June 28, 1969	San Diego	United States	San Diego International Sports Center
July 3, 1969	South Lake Tahoe	United States	The Fun House
July 4, 1969	South Lake Tahoe	United States	The Fun House
July 5, 1969	South Lake Tahoe	United States	The Fun House
July 11, 1969	San Francisco	United States	Fillmore West
July 12, 1969	San Francisco	United States	Fillmore West
July 13, 1969	San Francisco	United States	Fillmore West
July 19, 1969	Monterey	United States	Monterey Peninsula College Gymnasium
July 21, 1969	Concord	United States	Concord Armory
July 25, 1969 (Note: The concerts on July 25–26, 1969 were a part of the Seattle Pop Festival.)	Woodinville	United States	Gold Creek Park
July 26, 1969	Woodinville	United States	Gold Creek Park
July 30, 1969 (Note: The concert on July 30, 1969 was a part of the CBS Convention.)	Los Angeles	United States	The Century Plaza Hotel
August 1, 1969	New York City	United States	Fillmore East
August 2, 1969	New York City	United States	Fillmore East
August 3, 1969 (Note: The concert on August 3, 1969 was a part of the Atlantic City Pop Festival.)	Hamilton Township	United States	Atlantic City Race Track
August 8, 1969 (Note: The concerts on August 8–9, 1969 were a part of the Singer Bowl Music Festival.)	Queens	United States	New York State Pavilion
August 9, 1969	Queens	United States	New York State Pavilion
August 10, 1969	New York City	United States	Sheep Meadow
August 11, 1969	Stony Brook	United States	Stony Brook Student Activities Center
August 16, 1969 (Note: The concert on August 16, 1969 was a part of the Woodstock Music & Arts Fair.)	Bethel	United States	Yasgur Farms
August 18, 1969	Philadelphia	United States	Electric Factory
August 19, 1969	Philadelphia	United States	Electric Factory
August 21, 1969	Boston	United States	Boston Tea Party
August 22, 1969	Boston	United States	Boston Tea Party
August 23, 1969	Boston	United States	Boston Tea Party
August 29, 1969	Philadelphia	United States	The Main Point
August 31, 1969 (Note: The concert on August 31, 1969 was a part of the Texas International Pop Festival.)	Lewisville	United States	Dallas International Motor Speedway
September 1, 1969 (Note: The concert on September 1, 1969 was a part of the New Orleans Pop Festival.)	Prairieville	United States	Louisiana International Speedway
September 3, 1969	Grand Rapids	United States	Civic Auditorium
September 4, 1969	San Francisco	United States	Fillmore West
September 5, 1969	San Francisco	United States	Fillmore West
September 6, 1969	San Francisco	United States	Fillmore West
September 7, 1969	San Francisco	United States	Fillmore West
September 9, 1969	St. Louis	United States	N/A
September 10, 1969	Kansas City	United States	N/A
September 11, 1969	Omaha	United States	N/A
September 13, 1969	Sacramento	United States	Sacramento Memorial Auditorium
September 20, 1969	Los Angeles	United States	Hollywood Bowl
September 26, 1969	San Jose	United States	Santa Clara County Fairgrounds
September 27, 1969	Santa Rosa	United States	Santa Rosa Fairgrounds
October 1, 1969	Oakland	United States	Oakland Civic Auditorium
October 1, 1969	San Francisco	United States	Fillmore West
October 2, 1969	San Francisco	United States	Fillmore West
October 3, 1969	San Francisco	United States	Winterland Ballroom
October 4, 1969	San Francisco	United States	Winterland Ballroom
October 4, 1969 (Note: The second concert on October 4, 1969 was a part of Gold Rush.)	Amador County	United States	Lake Amador
October 9, 1969	Hayward	United States	Pioneer Gym
October 10, 1969	Fresno	United States	Exhibit Hall
October 11, 1969	Cincinnati	United States	Xavier University Fieldhouse
October 16, 1969	Minneapolis	United States	New City Opera House
October 17, 1969	Chicago	United States	Kinetic Playground
October 18, 1969	Chicago	United States	Kinetic Playground
October 19, 1969	Chicago	United States	Kinetic Playground
October 21, 1969 (2 shows)	Cincinnati	United States	Ludlow Garage
October 22, 1969	Cincinnati	United States	Ludlow Garage
October 24, 1969	Detroit	United States	Eastown Theatre
October 25, 1969	Detroit	United States	Eastown Theatre
October 31, 1969 (Note: The concerts on October 31–November 1, 1969 was a part of the 3rd Annual Quaker City Rock Festival.)	Philadelphia	United States	Philadelphia Convention Hall and Civic Center
November 1, 1969	Philadelphia	United States	Philadelphia Convention Hall and Civic Center
November 2, 1969	Pittsburgh	United States	Civic Arena
November 7, 1969 (2 shows)	New York City	United States	Fillmore East
November 8, 1969 (2 shows)	New York City	United States	Fillmore East
November 9, 1969	Washington, D.C.	United States	N/A
November 13, 1969	Cambridge	United States	The Ark
November 14, 1969	Cambridge	United States	The Ark
November 15, 1969	Cambridge	United States	The Ark
November 16, 1969	Rindge	United States	Franklin Pierce College
November 21, 1969	Detroit	United States	Eastown Theatre
November 22, 1969	Detroit	United States	Eastown Theatre
November 23, 1969 (2 shows)	Milwaukee	United States	Captain Frederick Pabst Theater
November 26, 1969	Denver	United States	Denver Coliseum
November 27, 1969	Salt Lake City	United States	Salt Palace
November 28, 1969	Dallas	United States	Dallas Memorial Auditorium
November 29, 1969	Phoenix	United States	Arizona Veterans Memorial Coliseum
December 6, 1969 (Note: The concert on December 6, 1969 was a part of the Altamont Speedway Free Festival.)	Tracy	United States	Altamont Speedway
December 18, 1969	San Francisco	United States	Winterland Ballroom
December 19, 1969	San Francisco	United States	Winterland Ballroom
December 20, 1969	San Francisco	United States	Winterland Ballroom
December 21, 1969	San Francisco	United States	Winterland Ballroom
December 27, 1969 (Note: The concerts on December 27 and 29, 1969 were a part of the Miami Rock Festival.)	Pembroke Pines	United States	Miami-Hollywood Motorsports Park
December 29, 1969	Pembroke Pines	United States	Miami-Hollywood Motorsports Park
December 31, 1969	San Francisco	United States	Fillmore West
January 16, 1970 (2 shows)	New York City	United States	Fillmore East
January 17, 1970 (2 shows)	New York City	United States	Fillmore East
February 4, 1970	San Francisco	United States	Family Dog on the Great Highway
February 6, 1970 (Note: The concert on February 6, 1970 was a part of the Black Panther Party Legal Defense Fund Benefit.)	Berkeley	United States	Berkeley Community Theatre
February 23, 1970	San Francisco	United States	Winterland Ballroom
February 26, 1970	Fresno	United States	Selland Arena
February 27, 1970	Ventura	United States	Ventura College
February 28, 1970 (2 shows)	Santa Monica	United States	Santa Monica Civic Auditorium
March 6, 1970 (2 shows)	Reno	United States	University of Nevada Gym
March 7, 1970	San Jose	United States	Santa Clara County Fairgrounds
March 13, 1970	Lancaster	United States	Mayser Center
March 14, 1970	Philadelphia	United States	Electric Factory
March 15, 1970 (2 shows)	Boston	United States	Boston Tea Party
March 19, 1070	Atlanta	United States	Municipal Auditorium
March 21, 1970	Tampa	United States	Curtis Hixon Hall
March 29, 1970	Vancouver	Canada	PNE Agrodome
April 10, 1970 (2 shows)	New York City	United States	Fillmore East
April 11, 1970 (2 shows)	New York City	United States	Fillmore East
April 12, 1970 (2 shows)	New York City	United States	Fillmore East

==== U.K. show (April 18, 1970) ====
List of tour dates with date, city, country, venue
Date	City	Country	Venue
April 18, 1970 (Note: The concert on April 18, 1970 was a part of The Sound of the Seventies.)	London	England	Royal Albert Hall

==== North American leg (April 24 – June 13, 1970) ====
List of tour dates with date, city, country, venue
Date	City	Country	Venue
April 24, 1970	Allentown	United States	Memorial Hall
April 26, 1970 (Note: The concert on April 26, 1970 was a part of the Gansett Tribal Rock Festival.)	Kingston	United States	Frank W. Keaney Gymnasium
May 15, 1970	Cleveland	United States	Allen Theatre
May 16, 1970 (2 shows)	Toronto	Canada	Massey Hall
May 22, 1970	Honolulu	United States	Waikiki Shell
May 23, 1970	Honolulu	United States	Waikiki Shell
June 11, 1970	Philadelphia	United States	Spectrum
June 12, 1970	Port Chester	United States	Capitol Theatre
June 13, 1970 (2 shows)	Port Chester	United States	Capitol Theatre

==== European leg (June 16–28, 1970) ====
List of tour dates with date, city, country, venue
Date	City	Country	Venue
June 16, 1970	London	England	Royal Albert Hall
June 19, 1970	London	England	Lyceum Ballroom
June 20, 1970 (Note: The concert on June 20, 1970 was a part of the Montreux Jazz Festival.)	Montreux	Switzerland	Montreux Casino
June 21, 1970	Hamburg	West Germany	N/A
June 23, 1970	Copenhagen	Denmark	Tivolis Koncertsal
June 26, 1970 (Note: The concert on June 26, 1970 was a part of the Kralingen Music Festival.)	Rotterdam	Netherlands	Kralingse Bos
June 28, 1970 (Note: The concert on June 28, 1970 was a part of the Bath Festival of Blues and Progressive Music '70.)	Shepton Mallet	England	Royal Bath and West Showground

== Abraxas Tour (1970–1971) ==
Abraxas Tour
- Tour by Santana
- Associated album: Abraxas
- Start date: August 4, 1970
- End date: May 9, 1971
- Legs: 4
- No. of shows: 44 in North America; 16 in Europe; 1 in Africa; 61 in total

Santana concert chronology
- Santana Tour (1969–1970); Abraxas Tour (1970–71); Santana III Tour (1971)

The Abraxas Tour was the second concert tour by American rock band Santana.

=== History ===
This tour was the first of two to feature guitarist Neal Schon. Schon joined the group in December 1970 after declining an invitation to be a part of Derek and the Dominos. The band now boasted a powerful dual-lead-guitar act that gave their music a tougher sound. In January 1971, drugs were becoming a problem in the group, so Carlos Santana spoke to Michael Carabello about this problem, but it would be a long time before they fixed it. Around the same time, José Areas was stricken with a near-fatal brain hemorrhage, and Santana hoped to continue by finding a temporary replacement (Willie Bobo played with the group for the sole African concert), while others in the band, especially Michael Carabello, felt it was wrong to perform publicly without Areas. Cliques formed, and the band started to disintegrate. In March 1971, Coke Escovedo joined the group, and these problems plagued the group into the start of the next tour.

=== Live releases ===
Live material from this tour has appeared on a number of different releases:

- "Toussaint L'Overture" and "Evil Ways" from the concert on August 18, 1970, in Lenox, Massachusetts were released on the 1988 video Viva Santana! An Intimate Conversation With Carlos Santana.
- "Jungle Strut", "Waiting", "Black Magic Woman", and "Gypsy Queen" from the show on March 6, 1971, in Ghana were released on the 1971 film Soul to Soul.

=== Reception ===
Billboard described one of the band's shows on August 10, 1970, at the Fillmore East in New York City as "exciting."

=== Tour band ===
- Gregg Rolie – lead vocals, Hammond organ, piano, percussion
- Carlos Santana – guitar, percussion, vocals
- Neal Schon – guitar
- David Brown – bass guitar
- Michael Shrieve – drums
- Michael Carabello – percussion, vocals
- José ”Chepito” Areas – timbales, congas, percussion, trumpet (on all dates but March 6, 1971)
- Willie Bobo – percussion (on March 6, 1971)
- Coke Escovedo – timbales, percussion (beginning on March 20, 1971)

=== Typical set lists ===
This is a usual set list of the group's concerts in 1970 (actual set list taken from the August 18 Lenox show):

All songs written by the members of Santana unless otherwise specified.

1. "Batuka" (José Areas, David Brown, Michael Carabello, Gregg Rolie, Michael Shrieve)
2. "Se Acabó" (Areas)
3. "Black Magic Woman" (Peter Green)
4. "Gypsy Queen" (Gábor Szabó)
5. "Oye Como Va" (Tito Puente)
6. "Incident at Neshabur" (Alberto Gianquinto, Carlos Santana)
7. "Toussaint L'Overture"
8. "Evil Ways" (Clarence "Sonny" Henry)
9. "Hope You're Feeling Better" (Rolie)
10. "Treat"
11. "Savor"
12. "Jin-go-lo-ba" (Babatunde Olatunji
13. "Soul Sacrifice" (Santana, Rolie, Brown, Marcus Malone)
14. "Gumbo" (Santana, Rolie)
15. "Persuasion"

This is an average set list of the group's performances in 1971 (actual set list taken from the March 23 Inglewood show):

1. "Waiting"
2. "Ballin'" (Carlos Santana, Gregg Rolie)
3. "Black Magic Woman" (Peter Green)
4. "Gypsy Queen" (Gábor Szabó)
5. "Oye Como Va" (Tito Puente)
6. "Samba Pa Ti" (Santana)
7. "Toussaint L'Overture"
8. "Evil Ways" (Clarence "Sonny" Henry)
9. "Incident at Neshabur" (Gianquinto, Santana)
10. "Jungle Strut" (Gene Ammons)
11. "Everybody's Everything" (Santana, Milton Brown, Tyrone Moss)
12. "Gumbo" (Santana, Rolie)
13. "Black Magic Woman (Reprise)" (Green)
14. "Oye Como Va (Reprise)" (Puente)
15. "Guajira" (José Areas, David Brown, Rico Reyes)

=== Tour dates ===
==== North American leg (August 4, 1970 – January 1, 1971) ====
List of tour dates with date, city, country, venue
Date	City	Country	Venue
August 4, 1970	San Francisco	United States	The Matrix
August 10, 1970 (2 shows)	New York City	United States	Fillmore East
August 11, 1970 (2 shows)	New York City	United States	Fillmore East
August 12, 1970 (2 shows)	New York City	United States	Fillmore East
August 14, 1970	Baltimore	United States	Baltimore Civic Center
August 15, 1970 (2 shows)	Stony Brook	United States	Stony Brook Student Activities Center
August 18, 1970	Lenox	United States	Tanglewood Music Shed
September 9, 1970	San Diego	United States	Community Concourse
September 10, 1970	San Francisco	United States	Fillmore West
September 11, 1970	San Francisco	United States	Fillmore West
September 12, 1970	San Francisco	United States	Fillmore West
September 13, 1970	San Francisco	United States	Fillmore West
September 16, 1970	Denver	United States	Mammoth Gardens
September 17, 1970	Denver	United States	Mammoth Gardens
September 18, 1970	Salt Lake City	United States	Salt Palace
September 19, 1970	Phoenix	United States	Arizona Veterans Memorial Coliseum
September 20, 1970	San Bernardino	United States	Swing Auditorium
September 24, 1970	Oklahoma City	United States	Oklahoma City University
September 25, 1970	Houston	United States	Houston Music Hall
September 26, 1970	San Antonio	United States	HemisFair Arena
September 27, 1970	Fort Worth	United States	Will Rogers Memorial Center
October 8, 1970	Nazareth	United States	Nazareth National Speedway
October 9, 1970	Troy	United States	RPI Field House
October 10, 1970 (2 shows)	Providence	United States	Rhode Island Auditorium
October 11, 1970	Chestnut Hill	United States	Roberts Center
October 14, 1970 (2 shows)	Port Chester	United States	Capitol Theatre
October 17, 1970	Coral Gables	United States	University of Miami
October 21, 1970	San Francisco	United States	The Matrix
January 1, 1971 (Note: The concert on January 1, 1971 was a part of the Sunshine '71 Festival.)	Honolulu	United States	Diamond Head

==== Ghanaian show (March 6, 1971) ====
List of tour dates with date, city, country, venue
Date	City	Country	Venue
March 6, 1971 (Note: The concert on March 6, 1971 was a part of Soul to Soul.)	Accra	Ghana	Black Star Square

==== U.S. leg (March 20 – April 3, 1971) ====
List of tour dates with date, city, country, venue
Date	City	Country	Venue
March 20, 1971	Sacramento	United States	California Exposition
March 22, 1971	Inglewood	United States	The Forum
March 23, 1971	Inglewood	United States	The Forum
March 26, 1971	San Francisco	United States	Winterland Ballroom
March 27, 1971	San Francisco	United States	Winterland Ballroom
March 28, 1971	San Francisco	United States	Winterland Ballroom
April 1, 1971	New York City	United States	Fillmore East
April 2, 1971	New York City	United States	Fillmore East
April 3, 1971	New York City	United States	Fillmore East

==== European leg (April 14 – May 9, 1971) ====
List of tour dates with date, city, country, venue
Date	City	Country	Venue
April 14, 1971	Copenhagen	Denmark	K.B. Hallen
April 16, 1971	Stockholm	Sweden	Stockholm Concert Hall
April 18, 1971	Rotterdam	Netherlands	Sportpaleis
April 19, 1971	Frankfurt	West Germany	Jahrhunderthalle
April 20, 1971	Munich	West Germany	Circus Krone Building
April 23, 1971	Hamburg	West Germany	N/A
April 24, 1971	Paris	France	L'Olympia Bruno Coquatrix
April 25, 1971	Paris	France	L'Olympia Bruno Coquatrix
April 27, 1971	Milan	Italy	Palazzetto Lido Sport
April 28, 1971	Rome	Italy	N/A
April 29, 1971	Rome	Italy	N/A
May 1, 1971 (2 shows) (Note: The concert on May 1, 1971 was a part of the Montreux Jazz Festival.)	Montreux	Switzerland	Montreux Casino
May 8, 1971	London	England	Hammersmith Odeon
May 9, 1971	London	England	Hammersmith Odeon

== Santana III Tour (1971) ==
Santana III Tour
- Tour by Santana
- Associated album: Santana
- Start date: June 10, 1971
- End date: December 6, 1971
- Legs: 3 (4 scheduled)
- No. of shows: 42 (43 scheduled)

Santana concert chronology
- Abraxas Tour (1970–71); Santana III Tour (1971); Caravanserai Tour (1972–73)

The Santana III Tour was the third concert tour by American rock band Santana in 1971, supporting their album Santana, commonly known as Santana III.

=== History ===
This tour was a rather unfavorable one for Santana. Due to David Brown's severe heroin use, he was replaced by Tom Rutley in August. In late September, due to an argument, the group toured without Carlos Santana, which Santana dismissed the group minus him as a "Santana tribute". In mid-October, Santana returned to the band, and Michael Carabello was taken out of the group. Santana returned because during a series of shows in New York City, the group was booed because Santana wasn't playing with them. An audience member from one of these shows, Mingo Lewis was chosen to play with the group in the meantime.

A South American tour was cut short in Lima, Peru in December. The group was supposed to perform on December 11 at the Estadio Universidad Nacional Mayor San Marcos in Lima, but they were deported back to the United States due to student protests against U.S. governmental policies. Even if around five million soles were sold in tickets, the concert was cancelled and its cancellation was announced on December 10 by the Minister of the Interior.

=== Live releases ===
Live material from this tour that has seen release all comes from the group's performance at the Fillmore West in San Francisco on July 4 and has appeared on the following:

- "Incident at Neshabur" was released on the 1988 compilation album Viva Santana!.
- "Incident at Neshabur" and "In a Silent Way" was released on the 1972 live album Fillmore: The Last Days and the 1972 film Fillmore.
- "In a Silent Way" was released on the 1995 box set Dance of the Rainbow Serpent.
- "Toussaint L'Overture" was released on the 1999 compilation album Rare Rock Tracks (11 Previously Unreleased Performances).
- The group's entire set minis "Soul Sacrifice" was released on the 2006 Legacy Edition of Santana III.

=== Tour band ===
- Gregg Rolie – lead vocals, Hammond organ, piano, percussion
- Carlos Santana – guitar, percussion, vocals (from June 10 to September 24, returning mid-October)
- Neal Schon – guitar
- Michael Shrieve – drums
- David Brown – bass guitar (through July 18)
- Tom Rutley – bass guitar (beginning September 16)
- José ”Chepito” Areas – timbales, congas, percussion, trumpet
- Michael Carabello – congas, percussion, vocals (through July 18)
- Coke Escovedo – timbales, percussion (through October 12)
- James ”Mingo” Lewis – congas, percussion (beginning mid-October)

=== Set list ===
This is a usual set list of this tour (actual set list taken from the September 28 Denver show):

1. "Batuka" (José Areas, David Brown, Michael Carabello, Gregg Rolie, Michael Shrieve)
2. "No One to Depend On" (Carabello, Coke Escovedo, Rolie, Willie Bobo, Melvin Lastie)
3. "Taboo" (Areas, Rolie)
4. "Se Acabó" (Areas)
5. "Waiting" (Carlos Santana)
6. "Incident at Neshabur" (Alberto Gianquinto, Santana)
7. "Black Magic Woman" (Peter Green)
8. "Gypsy Queen" (Gábor Szabó)
9. "Oye Como Va" (Tito Puente)
10. "In a Silent Way" (Joe Zawinul)
11. "Marbles" (John McLaughlin)
12. "Toussaint L'Overture" (Areas, Brown, Carabello, Rolie, Santana, Shrieve)
13. "Evil Ways" (Clarence "Sonny" Henry)
14. "Para los Rumberos" (Puente)
15. "Soul Sacrifice" (Santana, Rolie, Brown, Marcus Malone)

=== Tour dates ===
==== U.S. leg (June 10 – September 18) ====
List of tour dates with date, city, country, venue
Date (1971)	City	Country	Venue
June 10	Louisville	United States	Kentucky Exposition Center
June 11	Milwaukee	United States	Milwaukee Auditorium
June 12	Indianapolis	United States	Indiana State Fairgrounds Coliseum
June 13 (2 shows)	Chicago	United States	International Amphitheatre
July 4	San Francisco	United States	Fillmore West
July 18	Stanford	United States	Laurence Frost Amphitheater
September 16	Spokane	United States	Spokane Coliseum
September 17	Seattle	United States	Seattle Center Coliseum
September 18	Seattle	United States	Seattle Center Coliseum

==== Brazilian show (September 24) ====
List of tour dates with date, city, country, venue
Date (1971)	City	Country	Venue
September 24	Rio de Janeiro	Brazil	Theatro Municipal do Rio de Janeiro

==== North American leg (September 28 – December 6) ====
List of tour dates with date, city, country, venue
Date (1971)	City	Country	Venue
September 28	Denver	United States	Denver Coliseum
September 29	Denver	United States	Denver Coliseum
September 30	Denver	United States	Denver Coliseum
October 1	Cincinnati	United States	Cincinnati Gardens
October 2	Cleveland	United States	Public Auditorium
October 4	Detroit	United States	Detroit Olympia
October 5	Toronto	Canada	Massey Hall
October 7	Buffalo	United States	N/A
October 8	Syracuse	United States	Onondaga County War Memorial
October 11	Boston	United States	Boston Garden
October 12	Washington, D.C.	United States	D.C. Armory
October 14	New York City	United States	Felt Forum
October 15 (2 shows)	New York City	United States	Felt Forum
October 16 (2 shows)	New York City	United States	Felt Forum
October 18	Syracuse	United States	Onondaga County War Memorial
October 21	Greensboro	United States	Greensboro Memorial Coliseum
October 22	Richmond	United States	Richmond Coliseum
October 23	Baltimore	United States	N/A
October 24	N/A	United States	N/A
October 25	Philadelphia	United States	Spectrum
October 27	Pembroke Pines	United States	Hollywood Sportatorium
October 28	Pembroke Pines	United States	Hollywood Sportatorium
October 31	San Juan	Puerto Rico	Hiram Bithorn Stadium
November 5	San Diego	San Diego Sports Arena	
November 6 (2 shows)	Fresno	Selland Arena	
December 5	Honolulu	Honolulu International Center	
December 6	Honolulu	Honolulu International Center	

==== Canceled South American leg (December 11) ====
List of tour dates with date, city, country, venue
Date (1971)	City	Country	Venue
~~December 11~~	~~Lima~~	~~Peru~~	~~Stadium of the National University of San Marcos~~

=== Box office score data ===
List of box office score data with date, city, venue, attendance, gross, references
Date (1971)	City	Venue	Attendance	Gross	Ref(s)
October 14	New York City, United States	Felt Forum	22,350	$122,959	
October 15 (2 shows)	New York City, United States	Felt Forum	22,350	$122,959	
October 16 (2 shows)	New York City, United States	Felt Forum	22,350	$122,959	

== Caravanserai Tour (1972–1973) ==
The Caravanserai Tour was a series of performances by American Latin rock band Santana in support of their album Caravanserai during 1972 and 1973. It started on September 4, 1972, at the Erie Canal Soda Pop Festival in Griffin, Indiana, and ended on October 21, 1973, at Ginasio Municipal Novo in Brasília, Brazil. This tour could be considered to be the group's most eclectic tour at this point, as the band did concerts at every continent except Africa and Antarctica, including one of the first, if not the first, tours of Latin America by a major American rock act.

The tour was the first and only tour to feature the group's second lineup, "The New Santana Band", consisting of guitarist Carlos Santana, percussionists Armando Peraza and José Areas, bassist Doug Rauch, drummer Michael Shrieve, and Tom Coster and Richard Kermode on keyboards. The group often performed material from Caravanserai along with other improvisations and covers.

Some concerts were recorded and filmed and released as albums and films. The shows on July 3 and 4, 1973 at the Osaka Kōsei Nenkin Kaikan in Osaka, Japan were released as the triple vinyl LP Lotus (1974). Select concerts during the tour's Latin American portion were filmed and incorporated into the documentary, Santana en Colores (1973).

== Welcome Tour (1973–1974) ==
The Welcome Tour was a concert tour by Santana promoting their album, Welcome. The tour began on November 13, 1973, at Colston Hall in Bristol, England and ended on October 29, 1974, at the William P. Cole, Jr. Student Activities Building in College Park, Maryland.

== Borboletta Tour (1974–1975) ==
Borboletta Tour
- Tour by Santana
- Associated album: Borboletta
- Start date: November 16, 1974
- End date: December 31, 1975
- Legs: 5
- No. of shows: 67 in North America; 38 in Europe; 16 in Asia; 121 in total

Santana concert chronology
- Welcome Tour (1973–74); Borboletta Tour (1974–75); Pacific Tour '76 (1976)

The Borboletta Tour was the sixth concert tour by American rock band Santana in 1974 and 1975 in support of their album Borboletta.

=== History ===
After a performance in Honolulu, Hawaii, Santana toured Japan in November–December 1974. After the conclusion of the Japanese tour, the group performed extensively in North America from March to September 1975 with Eric Clapton and his band. Then, the band toured with Earth, Wind & Fire in Europe.

The singer of the opening act for the show at the Beacon Theatre in New York City on April 11, 1975, Alex Ligertwood of Tone, influenced Carlos Santana to enroll him into Santana in 1979 because he was enamored by his performance.

=== Tour band ===
- Leon Patillo – lead vocals, piano, organ (through November 15, 1975)
- Greg Walker – lead vocals, percussion (beginning December 4, 1975)
- Carlos Santana – guitar, percussion, vocals
- Tom Coster – Yamaha organ, Hammond organ, Minimoog, electric piano, percussion, vocals
- David Brown – bass guitar
- Leon "Ndugu" Chancler – drums
- Armando Peraza – congas, percussion
- Jules Broussard - saxophone, flute

=== Typical set lists ===
==== November–December 1974: Asian tour ====
After a show in Hawaii, the group embarked on 16-date tour of Japan, starting on November 23, 1974, at Kanazawa City Tourism Center in Kanazawa, and ending on December 14, 1974, in Fukuoka Kyuden Kinen Gymnasium in Fukuoka. This is a usual set list for this leg (actual set list taken from the December 3 Yokohama show):

1. "Going Home" (Anton Dvorák; arranged by Alice Coltrane, Carlos Santana, Tom Coster, Richard Kermode, Doug Rauch, Michael Shrieve, José Areas, Armando Peraza)
2. "A-1 Funk" (Santana, Coster, Kermode, Rauch, Shrieve, Areas, Peraza)
3. "Every Step of the Way" (Shrieve)
4. "Black Magic Woman" (Peter Green)
5. "Gypsy Queen" (Gábor Szabó)
6. "Oye Como Va" (Tito Puente)
7. "Mirage" (Leon Patillo)
8. "Just in Time to See the Sun" (Gregg Rolie, Santana, Shrieve)
9. "Bambele" (Areas, Peraza)
10. "Xibaba (She-Ba-Ba)" (Airto Moreira)
11. "Give and Take" (Santana, Coster, Shrieve)
12. "Incident at Neshabur" (Alberto Gianquinto, Santana)
13. "Soul Sacrifice" (Santana, Rolie, David Brown, Marcus Malone)
14. "Samba Pa Ti" (Santana)
15. "Savor" (Areas, Brown, Michael Carabello, Rolie, Santana, Shrieve)
16. "Toussaint L'Ouverture" (Areas, Brown, Carabello, Rolie, Santana, Shrieve)

==== March–September 1975: First North American tour ====
This tour began on March 23, 1975, with a benefit concert for the San Francisco school system at Kezar Stadium before at least 60,000 people, and stopped on September 1, 1975, at Oakland–Alameda County Coliseum in Oakland, California. A common set list for this tour was as follows (actual set list from the early May 29 Toronto concert):

1. "Incident at Neshabur" (Gianquinto, Santana)
2. "Black Magic Woman" (Green)
3. "Gypsy Queen" (Szabó)
4. "Oye Como Va" (Puente)
5. "Let the Music Set You Free" (Coster, Patillo, David Rubinson, Santana)
6. "Time Waits for No One" (Mick Jagger, Keith Richards)
7. "Give and Take" (Santana, Coster, Shrieve)
8. "Samba Pa Ti" (Santana)
9. "Mirage" (Leon Patillo)
10. "Savor" (Areas, Brown, Michael Carabello, Rolie, Santana, Shrieve)
11. "Toussaint L'Ouverture" (Areas, Brown, Carabello, Rolie, Santana, Shrieve)
12. "Soul Sacrifice" (Santana, Rolie, Brown, Malone)

==== September–October 1975: European tour ====
This tour lasted from September 5, 1975, at the Birmingham Hippodrome in Birmingham, England to October 13, 1975, at the Pavillon de Paris in Paris, France. The most complete set list of this leg is from September 14 at the [Palace Manchester] in Manchester, England.

1. "Incident at Neshabur" (Gianquinto, Santana)
2. "Black Magic Woman" (Green)
3. "Gypsy Queen" (Szabó)
4. "Oye Como Va" (Puente)
5. "Let the Music Set You Free" (Coster, Patillo, David Rubinson, Santana)
6. "Time Waits for No One" (Mick Jagger, Keith Richards)
7. "Samba Pa Ti" (Santana)
8. "Savor" (Areas, Brown, Michael Carabello, Rolie, Santana, Shrieve)
9. "Toussaint L'Ouverture" (Areas, Brown, Carabello, Rolie, Santana, Shrieve)
10. "Soul Sacrifice" (Santana, Rolie, Brown, Malone)

==== November–December 1975: Second North American tour ====
This brief tour of the United States commenced on November 14, 1975, at San Francisco's Winterland Ballroom and concluded on December 31, 1975, at the Cow Palace in Daly City, California. The only set list of this tour available is the New Year's Eve gig.

1. "Incident at Neshabur" (Gianquinto, Santana)
2. "Black Magic Woman" (Green)
3. "Gypsy Queen" (Szabó)
4. "Oye Como Va" (Puente)
5. "Tell Me Are You Tired" (Leon "Ndugu" Chancler, Coster)
6. "Time Waits for No One" (Jagger, Richards)
7. "Samba Pa Ti" (Santana)
8. "Give and Take" (Santana, Coster, Shrieve)
9. "Savor" (Areas, Brown, Michael Carabello, Rolie, Santana, Shrieve)
10. "Toussaint L'Ouverture" (Areas, Brown, Carabello, Rolie, Santana, Shrieve)
11. "Let Me" (Coster, Santana)
12. "Soul Sacrifice" (Santana, Rolie, Brown, Malone)

=== Tour dates ===
==== North American show (November 16, 1974) ====
List of tour dates with date, city, country, venue
Date	City	Country	Venue
November 16, 1974	Honolulu	United States	Honolulu International Center

==== Japanese leg (November 23 – December 14, 1974) ====
List of tour dates with date, city, country, venue
Date	City	Country	Venue
November 23, 1974	Kanazawa	Japan	Kanazawa City Tourism Center
November 25, 1974	Niigata	Japan	Niigata Prefectural Civic Center
November 26, 1974	Akita	Japan	Akita Prefectural Hall
November 29, 1974	Sapporo	Japan	Hokkaido Kōsei Nenkin Kaikan
November 30, 1974	Sapporo	Japan	Hokkaido Kōsei Nenkin Kaikan
December 3, 1974	Yokohama	Japan	Yokohama Cultural Gymnasium
December 5, 1974	Nagoya	Japan	Nagoya Civic Assembly Hall
December 6, 1974	Wakayama	Japan	Wakayama Prefecture Cultural Hall
December 7, 1974	Osaka	Japan	Osaka Kōsei Nenkin Kaikan
December 8, 1974	Tokyo	Japan	Shibuya Public Hall
December 9, 1974	Tokyo	Japan	Nippon Budokan
December 10, 1974	Tokyo	Japan	Nippon Budokan
December 11, 1974	Kyoto	Japan	Kyoto Kaikan
December 12, 1974	Osaka	Japan	Osaka Kōsei Nenkin Kaikan
December 13, 1974	Hiroshima	Japan	Hiroshima Prefectural Sports Center
December 14, 1974	Fukuoka	Japan	Fukuoka Kyuden Kinen Gymnasium

==== North American leg (March 23 – September 1, 1975) ====
List of tour dates with date, city, country, venue
Date	City	Country	Venue
March 23, 1975 (Note: The concert on March 23, 1975 was a part of the SNACK Benefit.)	San Francisco	United States	Kezar Stadium
April 1, 1975	Santa Monica	United States	Santa Monica Civic Auditorium
April 3, 1975	Watsonville	United States	Santa Cruz County Fairgrounds
April 4, 1975	San Jose	United States	San Jose Center for the Performing Arts
April 5, 1975	San Luis Obispo	United States	Mustang Stadium
April 6, 1975	San Diego	United States	San Diego Sports Arena
April 10, 1975	Buffalo	United States	Kleinhans Music Hall
April 11, 1975	New York City	United States	Beacon Theatre
April 12, 1975	Hempstead	United States	Calderone Concert Hall
April 15, 1975	Columbus	United States	Veterans Memorial Auditorium
April 16, 1975	Indianapolis	United States	Indiana Convention Center
April 18, 1975	Notre Dame	United States	Athletic & Convocation Center
April 19, 1975	Louisville	United States	Louisville Gardens
April 20, 1975	Cincinnati	United States	Armory Fieldhouse
April 21, 1975	Harrisonburg	United States	Godwin Hall
April 23, 1975	Hamilton	United States	Cotterell Court
April 24, 1975	Lewisburg	United States	Davis Gymnasium
April 25, 1975	Roanoke	United States	Roanoke Civic Center
April 26, 1975	Clemson	United States	Littlejohn Coliseum
April 27, 1975	Asheville	United States	Asheville Civic Center Arena
May 25, 1975	Ypsilanti	United States	Rynearson Stadium
May 29, 1975 (2 shows)	Toronto	Canada	Massey Hall
June 1, 1975	London	Canada	London Gardens
June 4, 1975	Moncton	Canada	Moncton Coliseum
June 14, 1975	Tampa	United States	Tampa Stadium
June 15, 1975	Jacksonville	United States	Jacksonville Veterans Memorial Coliseum
June 17, 1975	Mobile	United States	Mobile Municipal Auditorium
June 18, 1975	Memphis	United States	Mid-South Coliseum
June 19, 1975	Knoxville	United States	General James White Memorial Civic Coliseum
June 20, 1975	Charlotte	United States	Charlotte Coliseum
June 21, 1975	Cincinnati	United States	Cincinnati Gardens
June 23, 1975	Niagara Falls	United States	Niagara Falls International Convention Center
June 24, 1975	Springfield	United States	Springfield Civic Center
June 25, 1975	Providence	United States	Providence Civic Center
June 26, 1975	Saratoga Springs	United States	Saratoga Performing Arts Center
June 29, 1975	New Haven	United States	New Haven Veterans Memorial Coliseum
June 30, 1975	Pittsburgh	United States	Civic Arena
July 1, 1975	Detroit	United States	Olympia Stadium
July 3, 1975	Baltimore	United States	Memorial Stadium
July 4, 1975	Cleveland	United States	Richfield Coliseum
July 5, 1975	Chicago	United States	Chicago Stadium
July 7, 1975	Bloomington	United States	Metropolitan Sports Center
July 8, 1975	Madison	United States	Dane County Coliseum
July 10, 1975	Kansas City	United States	Municipal Auditorium
July 11, 1975	St. Louis	United States	Kiel Auditorium
August 3, 1975	Vancouver	Canada	Pacific Coliseum
August 4, 1975	Portland	United States	Veterans Memorial Coliseum
August 5, 1975	Seattle	United States	Seattle Center Coliseum
August 6, 1975	Spokane	United States	Spokane Coliseum
August 9, 1975	Stanford	United States	Frost Amphitheater
August 11, 1975	Salt Lake City	United States	Salt Palace
August 12, 1975	Denver	United States	Denver Coliseum
August 14, 1975	Inglewood	United States	The Forum
August 15, 1975	San Bernardino	United States	Swing Auditorium
August 16, 1975	San Diego	United States	San Diego Sports Arena
August 17, 1975	Tucson	United States	Tucson Community Center
August 31, 1975	Oakland	United States	Oakland–Alameda County Coliseum
September 1, 1975	Oakland	United States	Oakland–Alameda County Coliseum

==== European leg (September 5 – October 13, 1975) ====
List of tour dates with date, city, country, venue
Date	City	Country	Venue
September 5, 1975	Birmingham	England	Birmingham Hippodrome
September 6, 1975 (2 shows)	Birmingham	England	Birmingham Hippodrome
September 7, 1975 (2 shows)	Cardiff	Wales	Capitol Theatre
September 8, 1975 (2 shows)	Southampton	England	Gaumont Theatre
September 9, 1975 (2 shows)	London	England	Hammersmith Odeon
September 10, 1975 (2 shows)	London	England	Hammersmith Odeon
September 11, 1975 (2 shows)	London	England	Hammersmith Odeon
September 13, 1975	Liverpool	England	Liverpool Empire Theatre
September 14, 1975	Manchester	England	Palace Theatre Manchester
September 15, 1975	Newcastle upon Tyne	England	Newcastle City Hall
September 16, 1975	Glasgow	Scotland	The Apollo
September 17, 1975	Glasgow	Scotland	The Apollo
September 20, 1975	Frankfurt	West Germany	Jahrhunderthalle
September 21, 1975	Wiesbaden	West Germany	Rhein-Main-Hallen
September 22, 1975	Münster	West Germany	Halle Münsterland
September 23, 1975	Cologne	West Germany	Sporthalle
September 24, 1975	Düsseldorf	West Germany	Philips Halle
September 26, 1975	Hamburg	West Germany	Congress Centrum Hamburg
September 27, 1975	Gothenburg	Sweden	Scandinavium
September 28, 1975	Copenhagen	Denmark	Brøndbyhallen
September 30, 1975	West Berlin	West Germany	Deutschlandhalle
October 2, 1975	Linz	Austria	Linzer Sporthalle
October 3, 1975	Vienna	Austria	Wighalle
October 4, 1975	Zagreb	Yugoslavia	Dom Sportova
October 5, 1975	Belgrade	Yugoslavia	Pionir Hall
October 7, 1975 (2 shows)	Munich	West Germany	Circus Krone Building
October 8, 1975	Basel	Switzerland	St. Jakobshalle
October 9, 1975	Eppelheim	West Germany	Rhein-Neckar-Halle
October 10, 1975	Saarbrücken	West Germany	Messehalle 10
October 11, 1975	Rotterdam	Netherlands	Rotterdam Ahoy Sportpaleis
October 13, 1975	Paris	France	Pavillon de Paris

==== U.S. leg (November 14 – December 31, 1975) ====
List of tour dates with date, city, country, venue
Date	City	Country	Venue
November 14, 1975	San Francisco	United States	Winterland Ballroom
November 15, 1975	San Francisco	United States	Winterland Ballroom
December 4, 1975	Medford	United States	Medford Armory
December 5, 1975	Arcata	United States	Humboldt State University
December 6, 1975	Redding	United States	Cascade Theatre
December 7, 1975	Chico	United States	California State University, Chico
December 31, 1975	Daly City	United States	Cow Palace

== Pacific Tour '76 (1976) ==
List of Santana live performances
- Tour by Santana
- Associated album: Amigos
- Start date: February 1, 1976
- End date: March 17, 1976
- Legs: 2
- No. of shows: 21 in Asia; 8 in Oceania; 29 in total

Santana concert chronology
- Borboletta Tour (1974–75); Santana Pacific Tour '76 (1976); Amigos Tour (1976)

Santana Pacific Tour '76 was the seventh concert tour of countries bordering the Pacific Ocean in February and March 1976 by Santana.

=== Overview ===
This was a short, five-week tour of countries located in the Southern Hemisphere. It consisted of a tour of Australia and New Zealand and a tour of Japan. The tour began on 1 February 1976 with a performance at Carlaw Park in Auckland, New Zealand and ended on 17 March 1976 with a concert at Tsukisamu Dome in Sapporo, Japan. The Oceanic concerts were promoted by Paul Dainty Corporation, while the Japanese shows were promoted by Udo Concerts.

=== Tour band ===
- Greg Walker – lead vocals
- Carlos Santana – electric guitar, Latin percussion, vocals
- Tom Coster – Yamaha organ, Hammond organ, Minimoog, electric piano, keyboards, percussion, vocals
- David Brown – bass guitar
- Leon "Ndugu" Chancler – drums
- Armando Peraza – congas, percussion, vocals

=== Set list ===
This is an average set list of this tour:

1. "Incident at Neshabur" (Carlos Santana, Alberto Gianquinto)
2. "Black Magic Woman" (Peter Green)
3. "Gypsy Queen" (Gábor Szabó)
4. "Oye Como Va" (Tito Puente)
5. "Let It Shine" (David Brown, Ray Gardner)
6. "Europa (Earth's Cry Heaven's Smile)" (Tom Coster, Santana)
7. "Dance Sister Dance (Baila Mi Hermana)" (Leon "Ndugu" Chancler, Coster, David Rubinson)
8. "Give and Take" (Santana, Coster, Michael Shrieve)
9. "Samba Pa Ti" (Santana)
10. "Savor" (José "Chepito" Areas, Brown, Michael Carabello, Gregg Rolie, Santana, Shrieve)
11. "Toussaint L'Overture" (Areas, Brown, Carabello, Rolie, Shrieve, Carlos Santana)
12. "Let Me" (Coster, Santana)
13. "Soul Sacrifice" (Santana, Rolie, Brown, Marcus Malone)

=== Tour dates ===
==== Oceanic leg (February 1–17) ====
List of tour dates with date, city, country, venue
Date (1976)	City	Country	Venue
February 1	Auckland	New Zealand	Carlaw Park
February 4	Melbourne	Australia	Festival Hall
February 7	Adelaide	Australia	Apollo Stadium
February 10	Perth	Australia	Subiaco Oval
February 13	Brisbane	Australia	Brisbane Festival Hall
February 15	Sydney	Australia	Hordern Pavilion
February 16	Sydney	Australia	Hordern Pavilion
February 17	Sydney	Australia	Hordern Pavilion

==== Japanese leg (February 20 – March 17) ====
List of tour dates with date, city, country, venue
Date (1976)	City	Country	Venue
February 20	Tokyo	Japan	Nippon Budokan
February 21	Tokyo	Japan	Nippon Budokan
February 22	Osaka	Japan	Festival Hall
February 25	Osaka	Japan	Osaka Kōsei Nenkin Kaikan
February 27	Kyoto	Japan	Kyoto Kaikan
February 28	Takamatsu	Japan	Takamatsu Shimin Kaikan
February 29	Takamatsu	Japan	Takamatsu Shimin Kaikan
March 1	Osaka	Japan	Osaka Kōsei Nenkin Kaikan
March 2	Okayama	Japan	Kenritsu Taiikukan
March 3	Kitakyushu	Japan	Kokura Shimin Kaikan
March 5	Kumamoto	Japan	Kumamoto Prefectural Gymnasium
March 6	Fukuoka	Japan	Fukuoka Kyuden Kinen Gymnasium
March 8	Hiroshima	Japan	Hiroshima Prefectural Sports Center
March 9	Nagoya	Japan	Nagoya Civic Assembly Hall
March 10	Yokohama	Japan	Yokohama Cultural Gymnasium
March 11	Tokyo	Japan	Shibuya Public Hall
March 12	Tokyo	Japan	Shibuya Public Hall
March 13	Niigata	Japan	Niigata Prefectural Civic Center
March 15	Noboribetsu	Japan	Shin Nittetsu Muroran Taiikukan
March 16	Sapporo	Japan	Tsukisamu Dome
March 17	Sapporo	Japan	Tsukisamu Dome

== Amigos Tour (1976) ==
Amigos Tour
- Tour by Santana
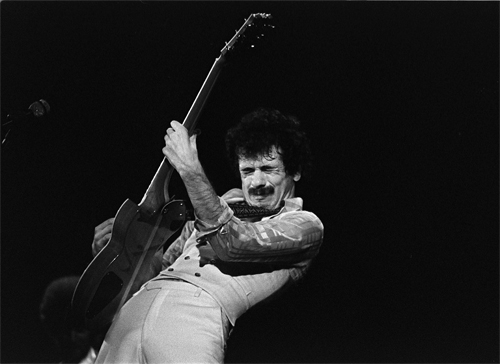
- Associated album: Amigos
- Start date: March 20, 1976
- End date: December 31, 1976
- Legs: 3
- No. of shows: 35 in Europe; 34 in North America; 69 in total

Santana concert chronology
- Pacific Tour '76 (1976); Amigos Tour (1976); Festivál Tour (1977)

The Amigos Tour was the eighth concert tour by Santana supporting their album Amigos.

=== History ===
The band spent most of 1976 supporting Amigos by embarking on a tour of the United States and Canada followed by a series of concerts in Europe, with the group finishing the year with a New Year's Eve concert at San Francisco's Winterland Ballroom. Lineup changes were frequent during this tour: David Brown left and he was replaced by Bryon Miller. However, Miller was replaced by Pablo Tellez around the same time as Leon "Ndugu" Chancler was replaced by Gaylord Birch. Armando Peraza was replaced by Raul Rekow and José "Chepito" Areas. Finally, Birch was replaced by Graham Lear, and Greg Walker was replaced by Luther Rabb for the European tour. The only consistent members of the entire tour were Tom Coster and Carlos Santana.

=== Reception ===
In a review of the band's show at New York City's Beacon Theatre on May 7, 1976, music critic John Rockwell described the concert as "unsuccessful." He stated that the gig had a poor sound system, and the music played at the performance was "faceless, Latin‐flavored jazz rock." On the hand, Robert Ford Jr. gave the concert a more positive review in Billboard.

=== Live releases ===
Live material from this tour has appeared on the following releases:

- Songs from different performances during the European tour were released on the 1977 album Moonflower. This is a list of songs from the album that were taken from a show during this leg:
  - "Carnaval", "Let the Children Play", and "Jugando" from the show on December 2 at Olympiahalle in Munich, West Germany.
  - "Savor" and "Toussaint L'Overture" from the gig on December 4 at the Théâtre de Plein Air in Colmar, France.
  - "Black Magic Woman", "Gypsy Queen", "Dance Sister Dance (Baila Mi Hermana)", and "Europa (Earth's Cry Heaven's Smile)" from the performance on December 5 at the Pavillon de Paris in Paris, France.
  - "Soul Sacrifice" and "Head, Hands & Feet" from the concert on December 15 at the Hammersmith Odeon in London, England.
    - Additionally, "Europa (Earth's Cry Heaven's Smile)" was also featured on the 1988 video Viva Santana! An Intimate Conversation With Carlos Santana.

=== Tour band ===
- Greg Walker – lead vocals, percussion (through June 5)
- Luther Rabb – lead vocals, percussion (beginning November 5)
- Carlos Santana – guitar, percussion, vocals
- Tom Coster – Yamaha organ, Hammond organ, Minimoog, electric piano, keyboards, percussion, vocals
- Byron Miller – bass guitar (through June 5)
- Pablo Tellez – bass guitar, vocals (beginning July 2)
- Leon "Ndugu" Chancler – drums (through June 5)
- Gaylord Birch – drums (from July 2 to August 25)
- Graham Lear – drums (beginning November 5)
- Armando Peraza – congas, percussion (through June 5)
- Francisco Aguabella – percussion (on June 5)
- Raul Rekow – congas, bongos, percussion, vocals (beginning July 2)
- José ”Chepito” Areas – timbales, congas, percussion, vocals (beginning July 2)

=== Typical set lists ===
==== March–August: North American tour ====
This tour began with a performance on March 20 at Sun Devil Stadium in Tempe, Arizona intended for the filming of A Star Is Born, and concluded with a gig on August 25 at the Schaefer Music Festival in Central Park's Wollman Rink. Here is a typical set list for this leg (actual set list taken from the May 8 Boston show):

1. "Black Magic Woman" (Peter Green)
2. "Gypsy Queen" (Gábor Szabó)
3. "Dance Sister Dance (Baila Mi Hermana)" (Leon "Ndugu" Chancler, Tom Coster, David Rubinson)
4. "Europa (Earth's Cry Heaven's Smile)" (Tom Coster, Carlos Santana)
5. "Let It Shine" (David Brown, Ray Gardner)
6. "Oye Como Va" (Tito Puente)
7. "Samba Pa Ti" (Santana)
8. "Savor" (José "Chepito" Areas, Brown, Michael Carabello, Gregg Rolie, Santana, Michael Shrieve)
9. "Toussaint L'Overture" (Areas, Brown, Carabello, Rolie, Shrieve, Santana)
10. "Let Me" (Coster, Santana)
11. "Soul Sacrifice" (Santana, Rolie, Brown, Marcus Malone)
12. "Incident at Neshabur" (Santana, Alberto Gianquinto)
13. "Evil Ways" (Clarence "Sonny" Henry)

==== November–December: European tour ====
This tour started on November 5 at Empire Pool in London, England, and ended on December 16 at an unknown venue in Lugano, Switzerland. Here is a typical set list for this leg (actual set list taken from the December 5 Paris show):

1. "Carnaval" (Coster, Santana)
2. "Let the Children Play" (Leon Patillo, Santana)
3. "Jugando" (Areas, Santana)
4. "Black Magic Woman" (Green)
5. "Gypsy Queen" (Szabó)
6. "Dance Sister Dance (Baila Mi Hermana)" (Chancler, Coster, Rubinson)
7. "Samba Pa Ti" (Santana)
8. "Savor" (Areas, Brown, Carabello, Rolie, Santana, Shrieve)
9. "Toussaint L'Overture" (Areas, Brown, Carabello, Rolie, Shrieve, Santana)
10. "Revelations" (Coster, Santana)
11. "Incident at Neshabur" (Santana, Gianquinto)
12. "Oye Como Va" (Puente)
13. "Let the Music Set You Free" (Coster, Patillo, Rubinson, Santana)
14. "María Caracóles" (Pello el Afrokán)
15. "Europa (Earth's Cry Heaven's Smile)" (Coster, Santana)
16. "Soul Sacrifice" (Santana, Rolie, Brown, Malone)

=== Tour dates ===
==== North American leg (March 20 – August 25) ====
List of tour dates with date, city, country, venue
Date (1976)	City	Country	Venue
March 20 (Note: The concert on March 20 was intended for the filming of A Star Is Born.)	Tempe	United States	Sun Devil Stadium
April 7	Saskatoon	Canada	N/A
April 8	Edmonton	Canada	N/A
April 15	Milwaukee	United States	Riverside Theater
April 16	Minneapolis	United States	Cyrus Northrop Memorial Auditorium
April 19	Detroit	United States	Cobo Arena
April 20	Madison	United States	Dane County Coliseum
May 2 (Note: The concert on May 2 was a part of Sunday Break.)	Austin	United States	Texas State Highway 290
May 7 (2 shows)	New York City	United States	Beacon Theatre
May 8	Boston	United States	Orpheum Theatre
May 9	Landover	United States	Capital Centre
May 11	Nashville	United States	Nashville Municipal Auditorium
May 12	Chattanooga	United States	Soldiers and Sailors Memorial Auditorium
May 14	Johnson City	United States	Freedom Hall Civic Center
May 15	Cincinnati	United States	Riverfront Coliseum
May 18	Toledo	United States	Toledo Sports Arena
May 26	Greater Sudbury	Canada	N/A
May 27	Toronto	Canada	Maple Leaf Gardens
May 30 (Note: The concert on May 30 was a part of Iowa Jam.)	Des Moines	United States	Iowa State Fairgrounds
June 5 (Note: The concert on June 5 was a part of Day on the Green.)	Oakland	United States	Oakland–Alameda County Coliseum
July 2	Fresno	United States	Selland Arena
July 3	Anaheim	United States	Anaheim Stadium
July 5	San Diego	United States	Golden Hall
July 6	Las Vegas	United States	Las Vegas Convention Center
July 7	Tucson	United States	Tucson Convention Center
July 13	San Antonio	United States	HemisFair Arena
July 16	Lubbock	United States	N/A
July 18	Denver	United States	Mile High Stadium
July 24	Kansas City	United States	Royals Stadium
July 25	Tulsa	United States	Tulsa Fairgrounds Speedway
August 23 (Note: The concerts on August 23 and 25 were a part of the Schaefer Music Festival.)	New York City	United States	Wollman Rink
August 25	New York City	United States	Wollman Rink

==== European leg (November 5 – December 16) ====
List of tour dates with date, city, country, venue
Date (1976)	City	Country	Venue
November 5	London	England	Empire Pool
November 6	London	England	Empire Pool
November 7	Leicester	England	De Montfort Hall
November 8	Bournemouth	England	Bournemouth Winter Gardens
November 10	Birmingham	England	Birmingham Odeon
November 11	Manchester	England	Kings Hall
November 12	Leeds	England	University of Leeds Refectory
November 13	Glasgow	Scotland	The Apollo
November 14	Edinburgh	Scotland	Edinburgh Playhouse
November 15	Liverpool	England	Liverpool Empire Theatre
November 18	Vienna	Austria	Wiener Stadthalle
November 19	Linz	Austria	Linzer Sporthalle
November 20	Böblingen	West Germany	Sporthalle
November 21	Zürich	Switzerland	Hallenstadion
November 23	Karlsruhe	West Germany	Schwarzwaldhalle
November 24	Frankfurt	West Germany	Festhalle Messe Frankfurt
November 25	Eppelheim	West Germany	Rhein-Neckar-Halle
November 26	Nuremberg	West Germany	Messezentrum Nuremberg
November 27	Saarbrücken	West Germany	Saarlandhalle
November 29	Brussels	Belgium	Forest National
November 30	Rotterdam	Netherlands	Sportpaleis
December 1	Düsseldorf	West Germany	Philips Halle
December 2	Munich	West Germany	Olympiahalle München
December 4	Colmar	France	Théâtre de Plein Air
December 5	Paris	France	Pavillon de Paris
December 6	Paris	France	Pavillon de Paris
December 7	Paris	France	Pavillon de Paris
December 8	Cologne	West Germany	Sporthalle
December 9	Kiel	West Germany	Ostseehalle
December 10	Hamburg	West Germany	Ernst-Merck-Halle
December 11	West Berlin	West Germany	Eissporthalle an der Jafféstraße
December 12	Dortmund	West Germany	Westfalenhallen
December 14	Geneva	Switzerland	N/A
December 15	London	England	Hammersmith Odeon
December 16	Lugano	Switzerland	N/A

==== U.S. show (December 31) ====
List of tour dates with date, city, country, venue
Date (1976)	City	Country	Venue
December 31	Daly City	United States	Cow Palace

=== Box office score data ===
List of box office score data with date, city, venue, attendance, gross, references
Date (1976)	City	Venue	Attendance	Gross	Ref(s)
April 15	Milwaukee, United States	Riverside Theater	3,557	$20,933	
April 16	Minneapolis, United States	Cyrus Northrop Memorial Auditorium	4,400	$24,300	
May 7 (2 shows)	New York City, United States	Beacon Theatre	5,298	$36,000	
May 12	Chattanooga, United States	Soldiers and Sailors Memorial Auditorium	3,024	$17,643	
May 14	Johnson City, United States	Freedom Hall Civic Center	3,947	$23,450	
May 15	Cincinnati, United States	Riverfront Coliseum	11,320	$68,671	
June 5	Oakland, United States	Oakland–Alameda County Coliseum	40,173	$341,472	
July 2	Fresno, United States	Selland Arena	6,000	$38,893	
July 3	Anaheim, United States	Anaheim Stadium	55,000	$550,000	
July 18	Denver, United States	Mile High Stadium	62,000 / 62,000	$496,000	
July 24	Kansas City, United States	Royals Stadium	36,662	$291,824	
July 25	Tulsa, United States	Tulsa Fairgrounds Speedway	26,495	$225,948	
December 31	Daly City, United States	Cow Palace	14,500 / 14,500	$145,000	
TOTAL			272,376	$2,280,134	

== Festivál Tour (1977) ==
Festivál Tour
- Tour by Santana
- Associated album: Festivál
- Start date: January 25, 1977
- End date: September 14, 1977
- Legs: 2
- No. of shows: 52 in North America; 16 in Europe; 68 in total

Santana concert chronology
- Amigos Tour (1976); Festivál Tour (1977); Moonflower Tour (1977–78)

The Festivál Tour was the ninth concert tour by Santana supporting their album Festivál.

=== History ===
Following the release of Festivál in January 1977, the group embarked on a tour of North America, followed by a 17-date European tour. Lineup changes weren't as common as the last tour, but some members came and went throughout this tour. Greg Walker came back, replacing Luther Rabb in January, and bassist David Margen and percussionist Pete Escovedo took over from Pablo Tellez and José "Chepito" Areas respectively in June. During the tour, Carlos Santana cancelled shows to reconcile with his wife Deborah. Bill Graham booked the band to perform at New York City's Radio City Music Hall during this tour, but the concerts were cancelled when Santana told Graham he needed time to settle with his wife. A show in Milan, Italy at Velodromo Vigorelli on September 14, 1977, was interrupted by leftist protesters in the beginning.

=== Live releases ===
Live material from this tour has appeared on the following releases:

- The group's concert with Spanish flamenco guitarist Paco de Lucía from August 19 or August 21 was released on the video Light and Shade in 2001.
- "Song of the Wind" from the show on August 23 or August 24 at the Arènes de Fréjus in Fréjus, France was released on the 1988 compilation album Viva Santana!. It was mislabeled on the album as being from a show in Paris.

=== Tour band ===
- Greg Walker – lead vocals, percussion
- Carlos Santana – guitar, percussion, vocals
- Tom Coster – Yamaha organ, Hammond organ, Minimoog, electric piano, keyboards, percussion, vocals
- Pablo Tellez – bass guitar, vocals (through April 24)
- David Margen – bass guitar (beginning June 29)
- Graham Lear – drums
- José "Chepito" Areas – timbales, congas, percussion, vocals (through April 24)
- Raul Rekow – congas, bongos, percussion, vocals
- Pete Escovedo – timbales, percussion (beginning June 29)

=== Reception ===
The concert on January 30, 1977, at the Long Beach Arena in Long Beach, California was praised by Billboard.

=== Typical set lists ===
==== January–July: North American tour ====
This leg began with a concert on January 25 at Robertson Gymnasium in Santa Barbara, California, and ended with a performance on July 9 at Seattle's Seattle Center Coliseum. Here is a typical set list for this leg (actual set list taken from the March 6 Hempstead show):

1. "Carnaval" (Tom Coster, Carlos Santana)
2. "Let the Children Play" (Leon Patillo, Santana)
3. "Jugando" (José "Chepito" Areas, Santana)
4. "Black Magic Woman" (Peter Green)
5. "Gypsy Queen" (Gábor Szabó)
6. "Dance Sister Dance (Baila Mi Hermana)" (Leon "Ndugu" Chancler, Coster, David Rubinson)
7. "Europa (Earth's Cry Heaven's Smile)" (Coster, Santana)
8. "Oye Como Va" (Tito Puente)
9. "Incident at Neshabur" (Santana, Alberto Gianquinto)
10. "Let Me" (Coster, Santana)
11. "Give Me Love" (Pablo Tellez)
12. "Savor" (Areas, Brown, Carabello, Rolie, Santana, Shrieve)
13. "Conga Solo" (Raul Rekow)
14. "Toussaint L'Overture" (Areas, Brown, Carabello, Rolie, Shrieve, Santana)
15. "Soul Sacrifice" (Santana, Rolie, Brown, Marcus Malone)
16. "Revelations" (Coster, Santana)
17. "María Caracóles" (Pello el Afrokán)
18. "Samba Pa Ti" (Santana)
19. "Let the Music Set You Free" (Coster, Patillo, Rubinson, Santana)
20. "Transcendance" (Santana)

==== August–September: European tour ====
This leg started on August 19 at Plaza de toros de las Arenas in Barcelona, Spain and ended on September 14 at Velodromo Vigorelli in Milan, Italy. Here is a typical set list for this leg (actual set list taken from the August 30 Bad Segeberg show):

1. "El Morocco" (Coster)
2. "Let the Children Play" (Patillo, Santana)
3. "Jugando" (Areas, Santana)
4. "Black Magic Woman" (Green)
5. "Gypsy Queen" (Szabó)
6. "Dance Sister Dance (Baila Mi Hermana)" (Chancler, Coster, Rubinson)
7. "Europa (Earth's Cry Heaven's Smile)" (Coster, Santana)
8. "I'll Be Waiting" (Santana)
9. "Oye Como Va" (Puente)
10. "Samba Pa Ti" (Santana)
11. "She's Not There" (Rod Argent)
12. "Savor" (Areas, David Brown, Michael Carabello, Gregg Rolie, Santana, Michael Shrieve)
13. "Toussaint L'Overture" (Areas, Brown, Carabello, Rolie, Shrieve, Santana)
14. "Flor d'Luna (Moonflower)" (Coster)
15. "Here And Now" (Armando Peraza, Santana)
16. "Soul Sacrifice" (Santana, Rolie, Brown, Malone)
17. "Evil Ways" (Clarence "Sonny" Henry)
18. "Transcendance" (Santana)

=== Tour dates ===
==== North American leg (January 25 – July 9) ====
List of tour dates with date, city, country, venue
Date (1977)	City	Country	Venue
January 25	Santa Barbara	United States	Robertson Gymnasium
January 28	San Bernardino	United States	Swing Auditorium
January 29	Los Angeles	United States	Shrine Auditorium
January 30	Long Beach	United States	Long Beach Arena
February 2	San Diego	United States	Golden Hall
February 3	Phoenix	United States	Phoenix Convention Center
February 5	Denver	United States	McNichols Sports Arena
February 6	Colorado Springs	United States	United States Air Force Academy
February 7	Colorado Springs	United States	Colorado Springs City Auditorium
February 9	Austin	United States	Municipal Auditorium
February 10	Houston	United States	Sam Houston Coliseum
February 11	Dallas	United States	Dallas Memorial Auditorium
February 12	Abilene	United States	Taylor County Coliseum
February 13	Corpus Christi	United States	Exhibition Hall
February 14	Kansas City	United States	Arrowhead Stadium
February 15	Kansas City	United States	Memorial Hall
February 16	St. Louis	United States	N/A
February 17	Bloomington	United States	N/A
February 18	Chicago	United States	Aragon Ballroom
February 19	Chicago	United States	Aragon Ballroom
February 21	Des Moines	United States	Veterans Memorial Auditorium
March 4	New York City	United States	Roseland Ballroom
March 5 (2 shows)	New York City	United States	Palladium
March 6	Hempstead	United States	Calderone Concert Hall
March 8	Toronto	Canada	Maple Leaf Gardens
March 9	Montreal	Canada	Montreal Forum
March 10	Kingston	Canada	Jock Harty Arena
March 12	East Lansing	United States	Jenison Fieldhouse
March 13	Port Huron	United States	St. Clair County Community College
March 14	Kalamazoo	United States	Wings Stadium
March 15	Detroit	United States	Detroit Masonic Temple
March 16	Boston	United States	Boston Garden
March 18	Durham	United States	Cameron Indoor Stadium
March 19	Landover	United States	Capital Centre
March 20	Philadelphia	United States	Spectrum
March 22	Atlanta	United States	Fox Theatre
March 23	Tampa	United States	Curtis Hixon Hall
March 24	Pembroke Pines	United States	Hollywood Sportatorium
April 1 (2 shows)	San Francisco	United States	Old Waldorf
April 2 (2 shows)	San Francisco	United States	Old Waldorf
April 5	Cincinnati	United States	Riverfront Coliseum
April 6	Pittsburgh	United States	Civic Arena
April 24 (Note: The concert on April 24 was part of Bread & Roses.)	Soledad	United States	Correctional Training Facility
June 29 (2 shows)	Santa Cruz	United States	The Catalyst
July 4 (Note: The concert on July 4 was part of Day on the Green.)	Oakland	United States	Oakland–Alameda County Coliseum
July 8	Portland	United States	Memorial Coliseum
July 9	Seattle	United States	Seattle Center Coliseum

==== European leg (August 19 – September 14) ====
List of tour dates with date, city, country, venue
Date (1977)	City	Country	Venue
August 19	Barcelona	Spain	Plaza de toros de las Arenas
August 21	San Sebastián	Spain	Palacio Municipal de Deportes
August 23	Fréjus	France	Arènes de Fréjus
August 24	Fréjus	France	Arènes de Fréjus
August 27	Leiden	Netherlands	Groenoordhallen
August 28	Neumünster	West Germany	Holstenhallen
August 29	Bremen	West Germany	Stadthalle Bremen
August 30	Bad Segeberg	West Germany	Kalkberg Stadium
September 3 (Note: The concert on September 3 was part of the Nuernberg Rock Festival '77.)	Nuremberg	West Germany	Zeppelinfeld
September 4 (Note: The concert on September 4 was part of the Karlsruhe Rock Festival '77.)	Karlsruhe	West Germany	Wildparkstadion
September 6	Essen	West Germany	Grugahalle
September 7	Brussels	Belgium	Forest National
September 10 (Note: The concert on September 10 was part of Garden Party X.)	London	England	Crystal Palace Bowl
September 12	Verona	Italy	Verona Arena
September 13	Turin	Italy	Palazzetto dello sport Parco Ruffini
September 14 (Note: The concert on September 14 was interrupted by leftist protesters in the beginning.)	Milan	Italy	Velodromo Vigorelli

=== Box office score data ===
List of box office score data with date, city, venue, attendance, gross, references
Date (1977)	City	Venue	Attendance	Gross	Ref(s)
January 30	Long Beach, United States	Long Beach Arena	6,258	$40,012	
February 2	San Diego, United States	Golden Hall	4,172 / 4,172	$27,000	
February 5	Denver, United States	McNichols Sports Arena	10,305	$82,235	
February 9	Austin, United States	Municipal Auditorium	4,260	$27,690	
February 12	Abilene, United States	Taylor County Coliseum	4,065	$26,244	
February 13	Corpus Christi, United States	Exhibit Hall	5,002	$33,532	
February 15	Kansas City, United States	Memorial Hall	3,100	$21,700	
March 5 (2 shows)	New York City, United States	Palladium	6,766 / 6,766	$54,400	
March 20	Philadelphia, United States	Spectrum	18,950 / 18,950	$127,926	
March 22	Atlanta, United States	Fox Theatre	3,833 / 3,833	$28,748	
March 23	Tampa, United States	Curtis Hixon Hall	3,608	$23,740	
April 6	Pittsburgh, United States	Civic Arena	7,748	$46,485	
July 4 (Note: The box office data for July 4 combines attendance and gross with July 2 show.)	Oakland, United States	Oakland–Alameda County Coliseum	102,239	$1,129,879	
TOTAL (Note: The total attendance combines attendance and gross from two Day in the Green shows; Santana only performed at the second show.)			180,306	$1,669,591	

== Moonflower Tour (1977–1978) ==
Moonflower Tour
- Tour by Santana
- Associated album: Moonflower
- Start date: October 8, 1977
- End date: October 16, 1978
- Legs: 4
- No. of shows: 70 in North America; 25 in Asia; 2 in Oceania; 97 in total

Santana concert chronology
- Festivál Tour (1977); Moonflower Tour (1977–78); European Tour 1978 (1978)

The Moonflower Tour was the tenth concert tour by Santana supporting the Moonflower album. The tour consisted of shows in small to mid-sized venues and rock festivals, as well as universities.

=== Live releases ===
Live material from this tour has appeared on the following releases:

- On Carlos Santana's 1979 solo album Oneness: Silver Dreams - Golden Reality, every song before "Silver Dreams Golden Smiles" was recorded on December 7, 1977, at Osaka Kōsei Nenkin Kaikan in Osaka, Japan.
- "Jugando" and "Dance Sister Dance (Baila Mi Hermana)" from the performance at the California Jam II festival in Ontario, California on March 18, 1978, was featured on the live album of the same name.
- "Dance Sister Dance (Baila Mi Hermana)" from the 1988 compilation album Viva Santana! is also from the March 18 show.

=== Tour band ===
- Greg Walker – lead vocals, percussion
- Carlos Santana – lead guitar, percussion, vocals
- Tom Coster – keyboards, synthesizer (through June 1978)
- Chris Solberg – rhythm guitar, keyboards (beginning June 1978)
- Chris Rhyne – keyboards (beginning June 1978)
- David Margen – bass guitar
- Graham Lear – drums
- Pete Escovedo – timbales, percussion
- Armando Peraza – congas, percussion, vocals
- Raul Rekow – congas, bongos, percussion, vocals

=== Typical set lists ===
==== November 1977: Australian shows ====
The band performed twice in Australia during this tour, solely as an act of the Rockarena festival, occurring on November 11, 1977, at the Sydney Showground in Sydney and November 13 at the Calder Park Raceway in Melbourne, playing to crowds of more than 43,000 and 60,000 respectively. The November 13 gig was televised, and the songs broadcast on television were:

1. "Zulu" (Tom Coster)
2. "Let the Children Play" (Leon Patillo, Carlos Santana)
3. "Jugando" (José Areas, Santana)
4. "Black Magic Woman" (Peter Green)
5. "Gypsy Queen" (Gábor Szabó)
6. "Dance Sister Dance (Baila Mi Hermana)" (Leon "Ndugu" Chancler, Coster, David Rubinson)
7. "Europa (Earth's Cry Heaven's Smile)" (Coster, Santana)
8. "I'll Be Waiting" (Santana)
9. "She's Not There" (Rod Argent)
10. "Batuka" (Areas, David Brown, Michael Carabello, Gregg Rolie, Michael Shrieve)
11. "No One to Depend On" (Carabello, Coke Escovedo, Rolie, Willie Bobo, Melvin Lastie)
12. "Evil Ways" (Clarence "Sonny" Henry)
13. "Oye Como Va" (Tito Puente)
14. "Oneness" (Santana)
15. "Savor" (Areas, Brown, Carabello, Rolie, Santana, Shrieve)
16. "Toussaint L'Overture" (Areas, Brown, Carabello, Rolie, Shrieve, Santana)
17. "Gitano" (Armando Peraza)
18. "Soul Sacrifice" (Santana, Rolie, Brown, Marcus Malone)

==== November–December 1977: Japanese tour ====
Santana performed 25 concerts in Japan, starting on November 19, 1977, at Nakajima Sports Center in Sapporo and ending on December 16, 1977, at Kurashiki Civic Cultural Hall in Kurashiki. This is a usual set list for this series of concerts (actual set list taken from the December 9 Osaka show):

1. "Arise Awake" (Santana)
2. "Light Versus Darkness" (Santana)
3. "Jim Jeannie" (Chico Hamilton)
4. "Transformation Day" (Alan Hovhaness, Santana)
5. "Victory" (Santana)
6. "Incident at Neshabur" (Alberto Gianquinto, Santana)
7. "Zulu" (Coster)
8. "Let the Children Play" (Patillo, Santana)
9. "Jugando" (Areas, Santana)
10. "Black Magic Woman" (Green)
11. "Gypsy Queen" (Szabó)
12. "Dance Sister Dance (Baila Mi Hermana)" (Chancler, Coster, Rubinson)
13. "Europa (Earth's Cry Heaven's Smile)" (Coster, Santana)
14. "The River" (Patillo, Santana)
15. "Batuka" (Areas, Brown, Carabello, Rolie, Shrieve)
16. "No One to Depend On" (Carabello, Escovedo, Rolie, Bobo, Lastie)
17. "Evil Ways" (Henry)
18. "Oye Como Va" (Puente)
19. "I'll Be Waiting" (Santana)
20. "She's Not There" (Argent)
21. "Savor" (Areas, Brown, Carabello, Rolie, Santana, Shrieve)
22. "Toussaint L'Overture" (Areas, Brown, Carabello, Rolie, Shrieve, Santana)
23. "Flor d'Luna (Moonflower)" (Coster)
24. "Guajira" (Areas, Brown, Rico Reyes)
25. "Soul Sacrifice" (Santana, Rolie, Brown, Malone)
26. "Solamente una vez" (Agustín Lara)
27. "Gitano" (Peraza)
28. "Concierto de Aranjuez" (Joaquín Rodrigo)
29. "Oneness" (Santana)
30. "Dawn" (Coster)
31. "Transcendance" (Santana)
32. "Samba Pa Ti" (Santana)

==== December 1977–October 1978: North American tour ====
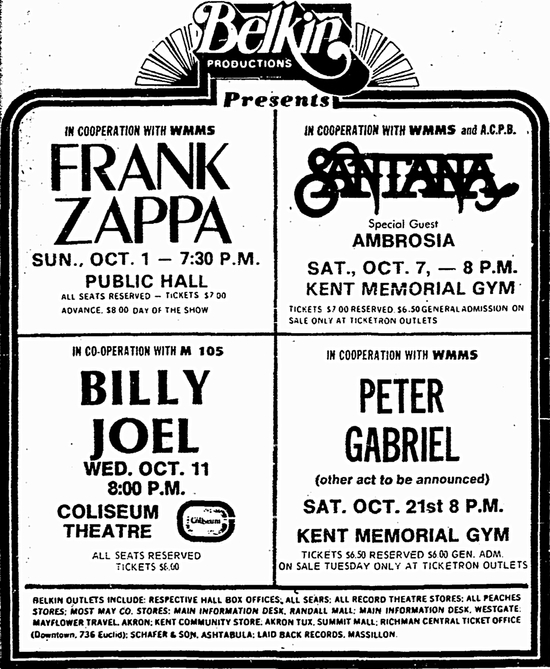
A Belkin Productions print advertisement for October 1978 concerts in Northeast Ohio, including Santana's concert at the Memorial Gym in Kent, Ohio on October 7, 1978

This tour lasted from December 31, 1977, at the Winterland Ballroom in San Francisco to October 16, 1978, at The Bottom Line in New York City. The band often performed at universities and clubs as well as large rock festivals. This set list is representative of the second show on October 16, 1978. It does not represent all concerts for the duration of the tour.

1. "Marathon" (Carlos Santana)
2. "Well All Right" (Norman Petty, Buddy Holly, Jerry Allison, Joe B. Mauldin)
3. "Black Magic Woman" (Peter Green)
4. "Gypsy Queen" (Gábor Szabó)
5. "Oye Como Va" (Tito Puente)
6. "Dance Sister Dance (Baila Mi Hermana)" (Leon "Ndugu" Chancler, Tom Coster, David Rubinson)
7. "Europa (Earth's Cry Heaven's Smile)" (Coster, Santana)
8. "Dealer/Spanish Rose" (Jim Capaldi/Santana)
9. "Incident at Neshabur" (Alberto Gianquinto, Santana)
10. "Victory" (Santana)
11. "Move On" (Santana, Chris Rhyne)
12. "Batuka" (Areas, Brown, Carabello, Rolie, Shrieve])
13. "No One to Depend On" (Carabello, Escovedo, Rolie, Bobo, Lastie)
14. "One Chain (Don't Make No Prison)" (Dennis Lambert, Brian Potter)
15. "Toussaint L'Overture" (Areas, Brown, Carabello, Rolie, Shrieve, Santana)
16. "She's Not There" (Argent)
17. "Open Invitation" (Santana, Lambert, Potter, Greg Walker, David Margen)
18. "Jungle Strut" (Gene Ammons)
19. "Transcendance" (Santana)
20. "Evil Ways" (Henry)

=== Tour dates ===
==== U.S. leg (October 8–29, 1977) ====
List of tour dates with date, city, country, venue
Date	City	Country	Venue
October 8, 1977	San Diego	United States	California Theatre
October 17, 1977	Atlanta	United States	Fox Theatre
October 24, 1977	New Orleans	United States	The Warehouse
October 25, 1977	Houston	United States	Sam Houston Coliseum
October 29, 1977	San Francisco	United States	Winterland Ballroom

==== Australian leg (November 11–13, 1977) ====
List of tour dates with date, city, country, venue
Date	City	Country	Venue
November 11, 1977 (Note: The concert on November 11, 1977 was a part of the Rockarena festival.)	Sydney	Australia	Sydney Showground
November 13, 1977 (Note: The concert on November 13, 1977 was a part of the Rockarena festival.)	Melbourne	Australia	Calder Park Raceway

==== Japanese leg (November 19 – December 16, 1977) ====
List of tour dates with date, city, country, venue
Date	City	Country	Venue
November 19, 1977	Sapporo	Japan	Nakajima Sports Center
November 20, 1977	Noboribetsu	Japan	Shin Nittetsu Muroran Taiikukan
November 21, 1977	Hakodate	Japan	Hakodate Shimin Taiikukan
November 22, 1977	Akita	Japan	Akita Prefectural Hall
November 24, 1977	Niigata	Japan	Niigata-shi Taiikukan
November 25, 1977	Fukui	Japan	Fukui Shiei Taiikukan
November 26, 1977	Kanazawa	Japan	Ishikawa Kōsei Nenkin Kaikan
November 27, 1977	Toyama	Japan	Toyama-shi Kokaido
November 28, 1977	Tokyo	Japan	Nippon Budokan
November 29, 1977	Tokyo	Japan	Nippon Budokan
November 30, 1977	Tokyo	Japan	Nakano Sun Plaza Hall
December 1, 1977	Tokyo	Japan	Nakano Sun Plaza Hall
December 2, 1977	Mito	Japan	Prefectural Culture Center
December 3, 1977	Kōriyama	Japan	Kōriyama Shimin Kaikan
December 5, 1977	Nagoya	Japan	Nagoya Civic Assembly Hall
December 6, 1977	Kyoto	Japan	Kyoto Kaikan
December 7, 1977	Osaka	Japan	Osaka Kōsei Nenkin Kaikan
December 8, 1977	Osaka	Japan	Osaka Kōsei Nenkin Kaikan
December 9, 1977	Osaka	Japan	Osaka Kōsei Nenkin Kaikan
December 10, 1977	Osaka	Japan	Festival Hall
December 12, 1977	Kitakyushu	Japan	Yahata Shimin Kaikan
December 13, 1977	Fukuoka	Japan	Fukuoka Kyuden Kinen Gymnasium
December 14, 1977	Kumamoto	Japan	Kumamoto Prefectural Gymnasium
December 15, 1977	Hiroshima	Japan	Hiroshima Prefectural Sports Center
December 16, 1977	Kurashiki	Japan	Kurashiki Civic Cultural Hall

==== North American leg (December 31, 1977 – October 16, 1978) ====
List of tour dates with date, city, country, venue
Date	City	Country	Venue
December 31, 1977	San Francisco	United States	Winterland Ballroom
February 7, 1978	Buffalo	United States	Shea's Buffalo
February 8, 1978	Passaic	United States	Capitol Theatre
February 9, 1978 (2 shows)	New York City	United States	Palladium
February 10, 1978 (2 shows)	New York City	United States	Palladium
February 11, 1978	Philadelphia	United States	Spectrum
February 12, 1978	Cleveland	United States	Public Auditorium
February 13, 1978	Toledo	United States	N/A
February 14, 1978 (2 shows)	Detroit	United States	Detroit Masonic Temple
February 15, 1978	Flint	United States	IMA Sports Arena
February 16, 1978	Toronto	Canada	Maple Leaf Gardens
February 17, 1978	Montreal	Canada	Montreal Forum
February 18, 1978 (2 shows)	Boston	United States	Music Hall
February 19, 1978	Syracuse	United States	Manley Field House
February 20, 1978	Landover	United States	Capital Centre
February 22, 1978	Houston	United States	Sam Houston Coliseum
February 24, 1978 (2 shows)	San Diego	United States	Fox Theatre
February 25, 1978	Los Angeles	United States	Shrine Auditorium
February 26, 1978	Fresno	United States	Selland Arena
March 12, 1978 (2 shows)	Portland	United States	Paramount Theatre
March 14, 1978	Seattle	United States	Seattle Center Arena
March 15, 1978	Boulder	United States	Balch Fieldhouse
March 16, 1978	Omaha	United States	Omaha Civic Auditorium
March 17, 1978	Minneapolis	United States	Cyrus Northrop Memorial Auditorium
March 18, 1978 (Note: The concert on March 18, 1978 was a part of California Jam II.)	Ontario	United States	Ontario Motor Speedway
March 19, 1978	Chicago	United States	International Amphitheatre
March 20, 1978	St. Louis	United States	Kiel Opera House
March 21, 1978	Fort Worth	United States	Tarrant County Convention Center
March 22, 1978	New Orleans	United States	Municipal Auditorium
March 23, 1978	Mobile	United States	Municipal Auditorium
March 24, 1978	Atlanta	United States	N/A
March 25, 1978	Lakeland	United States	Lakeland Civic Center
March 26, 1978	Pembroke Pines	United States	Hollywood Sportatorium
June 3, 1978	Cincinnati	United States	Bogart's
June 4, 1978	Richmond	United States	Much More
June 5, 1978	Philadelphia	United States	Spectrum
June 7, 1978	Chicago	United States	B'Ginnings
June 8, 1978	Rockford	United States	Flight of the Phoenix
June 9, 1978	Toronto	Canada	Maple Leaf Gardens
June 10, 1978	Montreal	Canada	Montreal Forum
June 23, 1978 (2 shows)	San Francisco	United States	Old Waldorf
June 25, 1978 (Note: The concert on June 25, 1978 was a part of the Oregon Music Harvest.)	Eugene	United States	Autzen Stadium
July 26, 1978 (Note: The concert on July 26, 1978 was a part of Day on the Green.)	Oakland	United States	Oakland–Alameda County Coliseum
September 1, 1978	Kansas City	United States	N/A
September 3, 1978 (Note: The concert on September 3, 1978 was a part of the Champagne Jam.)	Atlanta	United States	Grant Field
September 9, 1978	Santa Barbara	United States	Santa Barbara Bowl
September 10, 1978	Berkeley	United States	William Randolph Hearst Greek Theatre
September 22, 1978 (2 shows)	Monterey	United States	Monterey Conference Center
September 28, 1978	Minneapolis	United States	Cyrus Northrop Memorial Auditorium
October 1, 1978	Ann Arbor	United States	Hill Auditorium
October 5, 1978	Columbus	United States	Mershon Auditorium
October 7, 1978	Kent	United States	Memorial Gym
October 8, 1978	Dayton	United States	University of Dayton Arena
October 9, 1978	Passaic	United States	Capitol Theatre
October 12, 1978	Providence	United States	Alumni Hall
October 13, 1978	Vestal	United States	P.E. Center
October 16, 1978 (2 shows)	New York City	United States	The Bottom Line

=== Box office score data ===
List of box office score data with date, city, venue, attendance, gross, references
Date	City	Venue	Attendance	Gross	Ref(s)
December 31, 1977	Daly City, United States	Cow Palace	14,500 / 14,500	$144,160	
February 8, 1978	Passaic, United States	Capitol Theatre	3,356	$27,405	
February 9, 1978 (2 shows)	New York City, United States	Palladium	13,548	$111,604	
February 10, 1978 (2 shows)	New York City, United States	Palladium	13,548	$111,604	
February 18, 1978 (2 shows)	Boston, United States	Music Hall	8,450 / 8,450	$69,235	
February 24, 1978 (2 shows)	San Diego, United States	Fox Theatre	4,812 / 4,812	$39,146	
March 12, 1978 (2 shows)	Portland, United States	Paramount Theatre	5,679 / 5,679	$42,593	
March 14, 1978	Seattle, United States	Seattle Center Arena	6,000 / 6,000	$45,051	
March 15, 1978	Boulder, United States	Balch Fieldhouse	5,154	$34,468	
March 18, 1978	Ontario, United States	Ontario Motor Speedway	290,000 / 290,000	$2,500,000	
March 23, 1978	Mobile, United States	Municipal Auditorium	12,000 / 12,000	$87,568	
March 25, 1978	Lakeland, United States	Lakeland Civic Center	9,755 / 9,755	$68,285	
June 25, 1978	Eugene, United States	Autzen Stadium	48,713	$512,236	
July 26, 1978	Oakland, United States	Oakland–Alameda County Coliseum	60,000 / 60,000	$750,000	
September 9, 1978	Santa Barbara, United States	Santa Barbara Bowl	4,324	$34,082	
September 10, 1978	Berkeley, United States	William Randolph Hearst Greek Theatre	8,327 / 8,327	$64,281	
September 22, 1978 (2 shows)	Monterey, United States	Monterey Conference Center	4,900 / 4,900	$41,827	
September 28, 1978	Minneapolis, United States	Cyrus Northrop Memorial Auditorium	4,800 / 4,800	$35,060	
October 9, 1978	Passaic, United States	Capitol Theatre	3,456 / 3,456	$28,182	
October 13, 1978	Vestal, United States	P.E. Center	3,200 / 3,200	$19,200	
TOTAL			510,971	$4,654,383	

== European Tour 1978 (1978) ==
Santana European Tour 1978
- Tour by Santana
- Associated album: Inner Secrets
- Start date: October 30, 1978
- End date: December 10, 1978
- Legs: 1
- No. of shows: 34

Santana concert chronology
- Moonflower Tour (1977–78); Santana European Tour 1978 (1978); North American Tour 1979 (1979)

Santana European Tour 1978 was a concert tour of Europe by Santana, supporting the just released Inner Secrets album. The opening act for all of the shows was the Devadip Orchestra, a short-lived group led by Carlos Santana. The tour started on 30 October 1978 at Wembley Arena in London, England and ended on 10 December 1978 at Marché aux Fleurs in Nice, France.

=== Tour band ===
- Greg Walker – lead vocals, percussion
- Carlos Santana – lead guitar, percussion, vocals
- Chris Solberg – rhythm guitar, keyboards
- Chris Rhyne – keyboards
- David Margen – bass guitar
- Graham Lear – drums
- Pete Escovedo – timbales, percussion
- Armando Peraza – congas, percussion, vocals
- Raul Rekow – congas, bongos, percussion, vocals

=== Set list ===
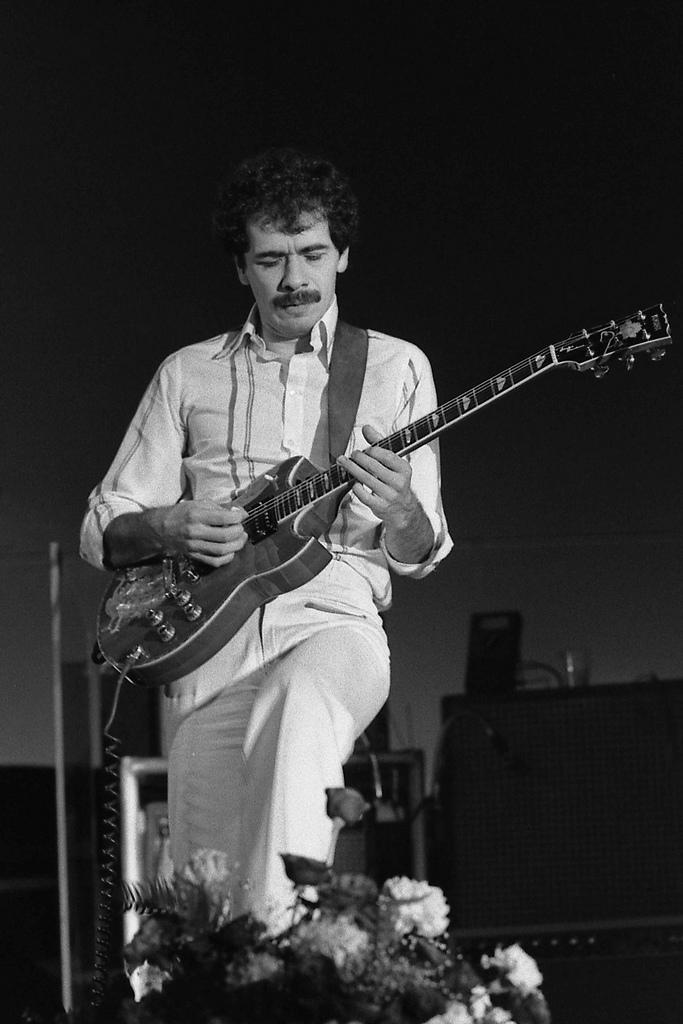
Carlos Santana performing at the Groenoordhallen in Leiden, Netherlands on 17 November 1978

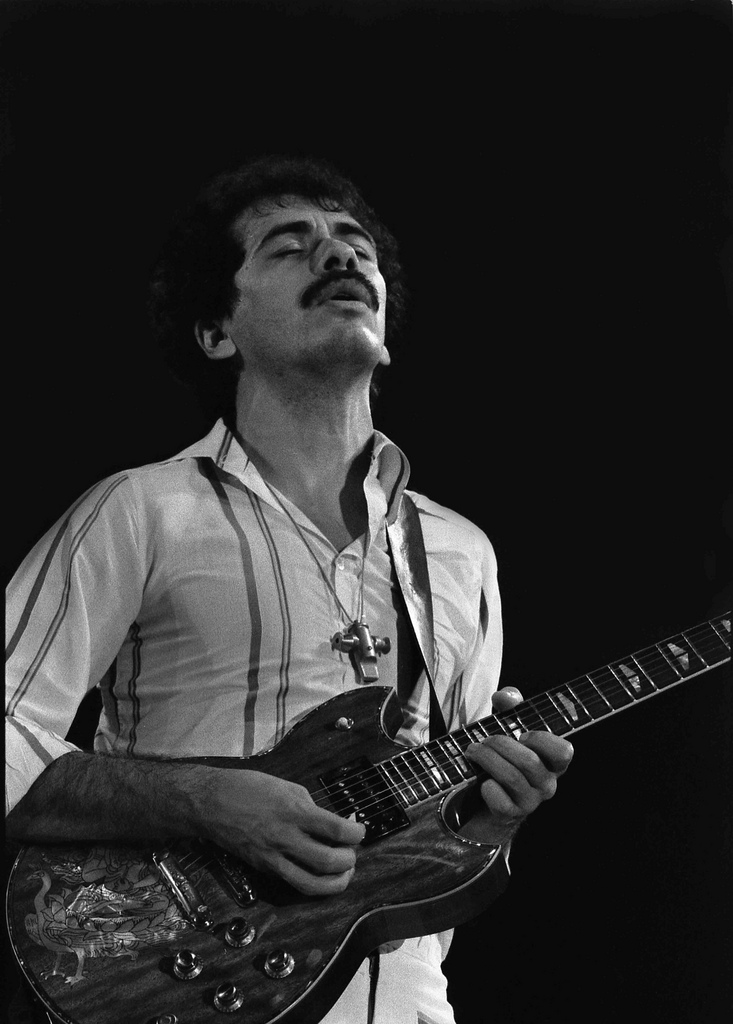
Carlos Santana performing at the Groenoordhallen in Leiden, Netherlands on 17 November 1978

This set list is representative of the show on 11 November. It does not represent all concerts for the duration of the tour.

1. "Marathon" (Carlos Santana)
2. "Well All Right" (Norman Petty, Buddy Holly, Jerry Allison, Joe B. Mauldin)
3. "Black Magic Woman" (Peter Green)
4. "Gypsy Queen" (Gábor Szabó)
5. "Oye Como Va" (Tito Puente)
6. "Dance Sister Dance (Baila Mi Hermana)" (Leon "Ndugu" Chancler, Tom Coster, David Rubinson)
7. "Europa (Earth's Cry Heaven's Smile)" (Coster, Santana)
8. "Dealer/Spanish Rose" (Jim Capaldi/Santana)
9. "Victory is Won" (Santana)
10. "Move On" (Santana, Chris Rhyne)
11. "Batuka" (José "Chepito" Areas, David Brown, Michael Carabello, Gregg Rolie, Michael Shrieve)
12. "No One to Depend On" (Carabello, Rolie, Coke Escovedo)
13. "Life Is a Lady/Holiday" (Dennis Lambert/Santana)
14. "One Chain (Don't Make No Prison)" (Lambert, Brian Potter)
15. "Toussaint L'Overture" (Areas, Brown, Carabello, Rolie, Shrieve, Santana)
16. "She's Not There" (Rod Argent)
17. "Open Invitation" (Santana, Lambert, Potter, Greg Walker, David Margen)
18. "Well All Right (Reprise)" (Petty, Holly, Allison, Mauldin)
19. "Transcendance" (Santana)
20. "Evil Ways" (Clarence "Sonny" Henry)

=== Tour dates ===
The itinerary as shown inside the official Santana European Tour 1978 tour programme consisted of:

List of tour dates with date, city, country, venue
Date (1978)	City	Country	Venue
October 30	London	England	Wembley Arena
October 31	London	England	Wembley Arena
November 1	London	England	Wembley Arena
November 3	Stafford	England	Bingley Hall
November 4	Manchester	England	Manchester Apollo
November 5	Manchester	England	Manchester Apollo
November 7	Brussels	Belgium	Forest National
November 8	West Berlin	West Germany	Deutschlandhalle
November 9	Hamburg	West Germany	Congress Centrum Hamburg
November 11	Gothenburg	Sweden	Scandinavium
November 12	Lund	Sweden	Olympen
November 13	Oslo	Norway	Ekeberghallen
November 14	Copenhagen	Denmark	Falkoner Teatret
November 16	Bremen	West Germany	Stadthalle Bremen
November 17	Leiden	Netherlands	Groenoordhallen
November 18	Dortmund	West Germany	Westfalenhallen
November 19	Zürich	Switzerland	Hallenstadion
November 21	Vienna	Austria	Wiener Stadthalle
November 22	Passau	West Germany	Nibelungenhalle
November 24	Cologne	West Germany	Sporthalle
November 25	Frankfurt	West Germany	Festhalle Messe Frankfurt
November 26	Saarbrücken	West Germany	Saarlandhalle
November 27	Stuttgart	West Germany	N/A
November 28	Eppelheim	West Germany	Rhein-Neckar-Halle
November 30	Hanover	West Germany	Eilenriedehalle
December 1	Nuremberg	West Germany	Messehalle
December 2	Munich	West Germany	Olympiahalle München
December 3	Colmar	France	Théâtre de Plein Air
December 4	Paris	France	Pavillon de Paris
December 5	Paris	France	Pavillon de Paris
December 6	Paris	France	Pavillon de Paris
December 7	Lyon	France	Palais d'Hiver
December 9	Barcelona	Spain	Palau dels Esports de Barcelona
December 10	Madrid	Spain	N/A

While the final dates performed were:

List of tour dates with date, city, country, venue
Date (1978)	City	Country	Venue
October 30	London	England	Wembley Arena
October 31	London	England	Wembley Arena
November 1	London	England	Wembley Arena
November 3	Stafford	England	Bingley Hall
November 4	Manchester	England	Manchester Apollo
November 5	Manchester	England	Manchester Apollo
November 7	Brussels	Belgium	Forest National
November 8	West Berlin	West Germany	Deutschlandhalle
November 9	Hamburg	West Germany	Congress Centrum Hamburg
November 11	Gothenburg	Sweden	Scandinavium
November 12	Lund	Sweden	Olympen
November 13	Oslo	Norway	Ekeberghallen
November 14	Copenhagen	Denmark	Falkoner Teatret
November 15	Essen	West Germany	N/A
November 16	Bremen	West Germany	Stadthalle Bremen
November 17	Leiden	Netherlands	Groenoordhallen
November 18	Frankfurt	West Germany	Festhalle Messe Frankfurt
November 19	Zürich	Switzerland	Hallenstadion
November 20	Ulm	West Germany	Donauhalle Ulm
November 22	Dortmund	West Germany	Westfalenhallen
November 24	Passau	West Germany	Nibelungenhalle
November 25	Sindelfingen	West Germany	Messehalle
November 26	Saarbrücken	West Germany	Saarlandhalle
November 27	Böblingen	West Germany	Sporthalle
November 29	Eppelheim	West Germany	Rhein-Neckar-Halle
November 30	Hanover	West Germany	Radrennbahn Messe-Sportpalast
December 1	Cologne	West Germany	Sporthalle
December 2	Munich	West Germany	Olympiahalle München
December 4	Paris	France	Pavillon de Paris
December 5	Paris	France	Pavillon de Paris
December 6	Paris	France	Pavillon de Paris
December 7	Paris	France	Pavillon de Paris
December 8	Saint-Étienne	France	Palais des Expositions
December 9	Barcelona	Spain	Palau dels Esports de Barcelona
December 10	Nice	France	Marché aux Fleurs

== North American Tour 1979 (1979) ==
Santana North American Tour 1979
- Tour by Santana
- Associated album: Inner Secrets
- Start date: February 3, 1979
- End date: September 16, 1979
- Legs: 1
- No. of shows: 52
- Box office: $1.512 million ($15 million in 2025 dollars)

Santana concert chronology
- European Tour 1978 (1978); Santana North American Tour 1979 (1979); 1979 tour of Australia, Japan and the United States (1979)

Santana North American Tour 1979 was a North American tour by Santana, supporting their album Inner Secrets.

=== Tour band ===
- Greg Walker – lead vocals, percussion (through April)
- Alex Ligertwood – lead vocals, rhythm guitar (beginning April)
- Carlos Santana – lead guitar, percussion, vocals
- Chris Solberg – rhythm guitar, keyboards
- Chris Rhyne – keyboards (through April)
- Alan Pasqua – keyboards (beginning April)
- David Margen – bass guitar
- Graham Lear – drums
- Raul Rekow – percussion, vocals
- Armando Peraza – percussion, vocals
- Pete Escovedo – percussion

=== Reception ===
The concert on February 7, 1979, at the Convention Center in Anaheim, California was described as a "technically excellent, yet, surprisingly uninspiring nine-song nearly 90-minute set."

=== Set list ===
The tour commenced on February 3 at the Paramount Theatre in Portland, Oregon and concluded on September 16, 1979, at Albuquerque Sports Stadium in Albuquerque, New Mexico. An average set list of this tour was as follows (actual set list from September 2):

1. "Marathon" (Carlos Santana)
2. "Well All Right" (Norman Petty, Buddy Holly, Jerry Allison, Joe B. Mauldin)
3. "All I Ever Wanted" (Alex Ligertwood, Santana, Chris Solberg)
4. "Black Magic Woman" (Peter Green)
5. "Gypsy Queen" (Gábor Szabó)
6. "Hard Times" (Ligertwood, Margen, Alan Pasqua) - 3:57
7. "Europa (Earth's Cry Heaven's Smile)" (Tom Coster, Santana)
8. "Batuka" (José "Chepito" Areas, David Brown, Michael Carabello, Gregg Rolie, Michael Shrieve)
9. "No One to Depend On" (Carabello, Rolie, Coke Escovedo)
10. "Savor" (Areas, Brown, Carabello, Rolie, Santana, Shrieve)
11. "Toussaint L'Ouverture" (Areas, Brown, Carabello, Rolie, Santana, Shrieve)
12. "Aqua Marine" (Pasqua, Santana)
13. "Lightning in the Sky" (Santana, Solberg)
14. "Open Invitation" (Santana, Dennis Lambert, Brian Potter, Greg Walker, David Margen)
15. "I Want You (She's So Heavy)" (John Lennon)
16. "Drum Solo" (Graham Lear)
17. "Percussion Solos" (Armando Peraza, Raul Rekow)
18. "Stand Up" (Santana, Solberg)
19. "Runnin" (Margen)
20. "Soul Sacrifice" (Santana, Rolie, Brown, Marcus Malone)
21. "She's Not There" (Rod Argent)
22. "Incident at Neshabur" (Alberto Gianquinto, Santana)
23. "Transcendance" (Santana)
24. "Evil Ways" (Clarence "Sonny" Henry)

=== Tour dates ===
List of tour dates with date, city, country, venue
Date (1979)	City	Country	Venue
February 3 (2 shows)	Portland	United States	Paramount Theatre
February 4	Seattle	United States	Seattle Center Arena
February 6	Sacramento	United States	Sacramento Memorial Auditorium
February 7	Anaheim	United States	Anaheim Convention Center
February 9	San Diego	United States	San Diego Civic Theatre
February 10	Las Vegas	United States	Aladdin Theatre for the Performing Arts
February 11	Tucson	United States	Tucson Arena
February 13	Fort Worth	United States	Tarrant County Convention Center Arena
February 14	Houston	United States	Sam Houston Coliseum
February 16	Tampa	United States	Curtis Hixon Hall
February 17	Pembroke Pines	United States	Hollywood Sportatorium
February 19	Atlanta	United States	Capri Ballroom
February 28	Cleveland	United States	Public Auditorium
March 1	Chicago	United States	International Amphitheatre
March 2 (2 shows)	Pittsburgh	United States	Stanley Theatre
March 3	Philadelphia	United States	Spectrum
March 5	Boston	United States	Boston Garden
March 7	Buffalo	United States	Buffalo Memorial Auditorium
March 8	Landover	United States	Capital Centre
March 9	Cincinnati	United States	Riverfront Coliseum
March 10	Indianapolis	United States	Market Square Arena
March 11	Tucson	United States	Tucson Arena
March 13	Montreal	Canada	Montreal Forum
March 14	Rochester	United States	Rochester Community War Memorial
March 15	New York City	United States	Madison Square Garden
March 17	Detroit	United States	Cobo Arena
March 18	Toronto	Canada	Maple Leaf Gardens
March 23	San Rafael	United States	Marin Veterans' Memorial Auditorium
March 25	Berkeley	United States	Zellerbach Auditorium
April 22	San Francisco	United States	Old Waldorf
June 23	Saratoga Springs	United States	Saratoga Performing Arts Center
July 14 (2 shows)	Los Angeles	United States	Universal Amphitheatre
July 15	Santa Barbara	United States	Santa Barbara Bowl
August 4	Milwaukee	United States	Henry Maier Festival Park
August 5 (Note: The concert on August 5 was a part of Day in the Park.)	Chicago	United States	Comiskey Park
August 20	Kansas City	United States	Kemper Arena
August 28	Battle Creek	United States	W.K. Kellogg Auditorium
August 29	Saint Paul	United States	Midway Stadium
August 31	Omaha	United States	Johnny Rosenblatt Stadium
September 1 (Note: The concert on September 1 was a part of Summer Jam '79.)	Kansas City	United States	Royals Stadium
September 2	Kansas City	United States	Uptown Theater
September 3	Morrison	United States	Red Rocks Amphitheatre
September 6	Austin	United States	Municipal Auditorium
September 7	San Antonio	United States	Convention Center Arena
September 8	Corpus Christi	United States	Memorial Coliseum
September 9	McAllen	United States	La Villa Real Special Events Center
September 14	Las Cruces	United States	Pan American Center
September 15	Phoenix	United States	Celebrity Theatre
September 16	Albuquerque	United States	Albuquerque Sports Stadium

=== Box office score data ===
List of box office score data with date, city, venue, attendance, gross, references
Date (1979)	City	Venue	Attendance	Gross	Ref(s)
February 3 (2 shows)	Portland, United States	Paramount Theatre	5,920 / 5,920	$48,875	
February 4	Seattle, United States	Seattle Center Arena	6,000 / 6,000	$50,932	
February 6	Sacramento, United States	Sacramento Memorial Auditorium	3,838 / 8,838	$32,245	
February 7	Anaheim, United States	Anaheim Convention Center	8,220 / 8,220	$64,552	
February 16	Tampa, United States	Curtis Hixon Hall	7,600	$60,288	
March 2 (2 shows)	Pittsburgh, United States	Stanley Theatre	7,400 / 7,400	$68,404	
March 5	Boston, United States	Boston Garden	9,200	$86,343	
March 9	Cincinnati, United States	Riverfront Coliseum	8,405 / 8,405	$63,000	
March 10	Indianapolis, United States	Market Square Arena	13,533	$104,950	
March 11	Tucson, United States	Tucson Arena	7,100	$54,800	
March 14	Rochester, United States	Rochester Community War Memorial	6,205	$41,510	
March 15	New York City, United States	Madison Square Garden	19,600 / 19,600	$171,000	
March 23	San Rafael, United States	Marin Veterans' Memorial Auditorium	2,000 / 2,000	$19,831	
March 23	Berkeley, United States	Zellerbach Auditorium	2,096	$16,276	
September 1	Kansas City, United States	Royals Stadium	34,087	$423,204	
September 3	Morrison, United States	Red Rocks Amphitheatre	8,500 / 8,500	$79,843	
September 7	San Antonio, United States	Convention Center Arena	7,284	$54,630	
September 8	Corpus Christi, United States	Memorial Coliseum	4,380	$37,142	
September 9	McAllen, United States	La Villa Real Special Events Center	4,000 / 4,000	$34,565	
TOTAL			165,368	$1,512,360	

== 1979 tour of Australia, Japan and the United States (1979) ==
Santana's 1979 tour of Australia, Japan and the United States
- Tour by Santana
- Associated album: Marathon
- Start date: October 1, 1979
- End date: December 2, 1979
- Legs: 3
- No. of shows: 15 in North America; 9 in Oceania; 8 in Asia; 32 in total

Santana concert chronology
- North American Tour 1979 (1979); Santana's 1979 tour of Australia, Japan and the United States (1979); Europe Tour '80 (1980)

During the last quarter of 1979, American rock band Santana toured Australia, Japan and the United States in support of their album Marathon. Eddie Money toured with the group through October 28.

=== Live releases ===
Live material from this tour has appeared on the following releases:

- "Europa (Earth's Cry Heaven's Smile)" from October 24 at the Festival Hall in Osaka, Japan was featured on the 1988 compilation album Viva Santana!.

=== Tour band ===
- Alex Ligertwood – lead vocals, rhythm guitar
- Carlos Santana – lead guitar, percussion, vocals
- Chris Solberg – rhythm guitar, keyboards
- Alan Pasqua – keyboards
- David Margen – bass guitar
- Graham Lear – drums
- Pete Escovedo – timbales, percussion
- Armando Peraza – congas, percussion, vocals
- Raul Rekow – congas, bongos, percussion, vocals

=== Reception ===
The band's concert on November 25, 1979, at the Palladium in New York City was praised in a review for Billboard.

=== Typical set lists ===
==== Australian dates ====
The Australian tour lasted from October 1 in Apollo Stadium in Adelaide to October 10 at the Hordern Pavilion in Sydney. The most complete set list is from the 8th.

1. "Marathon" (Carlos Santana)
2. "Well All Right" (Norman Petty, Buddy Holly, Jerry Allison, Joe B. Mauldin)
3. "All I Ever Wanted" (Alex Ligertwood, Santana, Chris Solberg)
4. "Singing Winds, Crying Beasts" (Michael Carabello)
5. "Black Magic Woman" (Peter Green)
6. "Gypsy Queen" (Gábor Szabó)
7. "Open Invitation" (Santana, Dennis Lambert, Brian Potter, Greg Walker, David Margen)
8. "Europa (Earth's Cry Heaven's Smile)" (Tom Coster, Santana)
9. "Batuka" (José "Chepito" Areas, David Brown, Michael Carabello, Gregg Rolie, Michael Shrieve)
10. "No One to Depend On" (Carabello, Rolie, Coke Escovedo)
11. "You Know That I Love You" (Ligertwood, Alan Pasqua, Santana)
12. "Lightning in the Sky" (Santana, Solberg)
13. "Aqua Marine" (Pasqua, Santana)
14. "Stand Up" (Santana, Solberg)
15. "Runnin" (Margen)
16. "Soul Sacrifice" (Santana, Rolie, Brown, Marcus Malone)
17. "She's Not There" (Rod Argent)
18. "Transcendance" (Santana)
19. "I Want You (She's So Heavy)" (John Lennon)
20. "Evil Ways" (Clarence "Sonny" Henry)
21. "Shake Your Moneymaker" (Elmore James)

==== Japanese performances ====
The band performed in Japan from October 16 at Fukuoka Kyuden Kinen Gymnasium in Fukuoka to October 25 at Festival Hall in Osaka. An average set list was as follows (actual set list from October 19):

1. "Marathon" (Santana)
2. "Well All Right" (Petty, Holly, Allison, Mauldin)
3. "All I Ever Wanted" (Ligertwood, Santana, Solberg)
4. "Tales of Kilimanjaro" (Pasqua, Armando Peraza, Raul Rekow, Santana)
5. "Black Magic Woman" (Green)
6. "Gypsy Queen" (Szabó)
7. "Open Invitation" (Santana, Lambert, Potter, Walker, Margen)
8. "Europa (Earth's Cry Heaven's Smile)" (Coster, Santana)
9. "Batuka" (Areas, Brown, Carabello, Rolie, Shrieve)
10. "No One to Depend On" (Carabello, Rolie, Escovedo)
11. "Incident at Neshabur" (Alberto Gianquinto, Santana)
12. "Lightning in the Sky" (Santana, Solberg)
13. "Aqua Marine" (Pasqua, Santana)
14. "Stand Up" (Santana, Solberg)
15. "Runnin" (Margen)
16. "Soul Sacrifice" (Santana, Rolie, Brown, Malone)
17. "She's Not There" (Argent)
18. "Transcendance" (Santana)
19. "I Want You" (Arthur "T-Boy" Ross, Leon Ware)
20. "Evil Ways" (Henry)

==== US tour ====
This US tour commenced on October 28 at the Aloha Stadium in Honolulu and concluded on December 2 at the Fox Theatre in Atlanta. Unusually, selections from Caravanserai were performed. An average set list was as follows (taken from November 17):

1. "Marathon" (Santana)
2. "Well All Right" (Petty, Holly, Allison, Mauldin)
3. "All I Ever Wanted" (Ligertwood, Santana, Solberg)
4. "Tales of Kilimanjaro" (Pasqua, Peraza, Rekow, Santana)
5. "Black Magic Woman" (Green)
6. "Gypsy Queen" (Szabó)
7. "Open Invitation" (Santana, Lambert, Potter, Walker, Margen)
8. "Europa (Earth's Cry Heaven's Smile)" (Coster, Santana)
9. "No One to Depend On" (Carabello, Rolie, Escovedo)
10. "Toussaint L'Ouverture" (Areas, Brown, Carabello, Rolie, Santana, Shrieve)
11. "Aqua Marine" (Pasqua, Santana)
12. "Just in Time to See the Sun" (Rolie, Santana, Shrieve)
13. "Song of the Wind" (Rolie, Santana, Schon)
14. "Lightning in the Sky" (Santana, Solberg)
15. "Savor" (Areas, Brown, Carabello, Rolie, Santana, Shrieve)
16. "Jin-go-lo-ba" (Babatunde Olatunji
17. "You Know That I Love You" (Ligertwood, Pasqua, Santana)
18. "Stand Up" (Santana, Solberg)
19. "Runnin" (Margen)
20. "Soul Sacrifice" (Santana, Rolie, Brown, Malone)
21. "Incident at Neshabur" (Gianquinto, Santana)
22. "Oye Como Va" (Tito Puente)
23. "She's Not There" (Rod Argent)
24. "Transcendance" (Santana)
25. "I Want You" (Ross, Ware)
26. "Evil Ways" (Henry)

=== Tour dates ===
==== Australian leg (October 1–10) ====
List of tour dates with date, city, country, venue
Date (1979)	City	Country	Venue
October 1	Adelaide	Australia	Apollo Stadium
October 2	Adelaide	Australia	Apollo Stadium
October 3	Melbourne	Australia	Festival Hall
October 4	Melbourne	Australia	Festival Hall
October 5	Melbourne	Australia	Festival Hall
October 7	Brisbane	Australia	Brisbane Festival Hall
October 8	Sydney	Australia	Hordern Pavilion
October 9	Sydney	Australia	Hordern Pavilion
October 10	Sydney	Australia	Hordern Pavilion

==== Japanese leg (October 16–25) ====
List of tour dates with date, city, country, venue
Date (1979)	City	Country	Venue
October 16	Fukuoka	Japan	Fukuoka Kyuden Kinen Gymnasium
October 18	Hiroshima	Japan	Yubin Chokin Hall
October 19	Osaka	Japan	Osaka Kōsei Nenkin Kaikan
October 21 (Note: The concert on October 21 was a part of Guitar Wars.)	Tokyo	Japan	Korakuen Hall
October 22	Tokyo	Japan	Nippon Budokan
October 23	Tokyo	Japan	Nippon Budokan
October 24	Osaka	Japan	Festival Hall
October 25	Osaka	Japan	Festival Hall

==== U.S. leg (October 28 – December 2) ====
List of tour dates with date, city, country, venue
Date (1979)	City	Country	Venue
October 28	Honolulu	United States	Aloha Stadium
November 15	San Diego	United States	Fox Theatre
November 16	Long Beach	United States	Terrace Theater
November 17 (2 shows)	San Francisco	United States	Warfield Theatre
November 21 (2 shows)	Detroit	United States	Detroit Masonic Temple
November 22	Chicago	United States	Uptown Theatre
November 24	Hempstead	United States	Calderone Concert Hall
November 25	New York City	United States	Palladium
November 27	Washington, D.C.	United States	DAR Constitution Hall
November 28	Passaic	United States	Capitol Theatre
November 29	Boston	United States	Music Hall
November 30	Upper Darby Township	United States	Tower Theater
December 2	Atlanta	United States	Fox Theatre

=== Box office score data ===
List of box office score data with date, city, venue, attendance, gross, references
Date (1979)	City	Venue	Attendance	Gross	Ref(s)
October 28	Honolulu, United States	Aloha Stadium	12,193	$123,405	
November 15	San Diego, United States	Fox Theatre	2,285 / 2,285	$21,350	
November 16	Long Beach, United States	Terrace Theater	2,884 / 2,884	$27,932	
November 17 (2 shows)	San Francisco, United States	Warfield Theatre	4,199 / 4,199	$39,301	
November 29	Boston, United States	Music Hall	4,200 / 4,200	$38,837	
TOTAL			25,761	$250,825	
