= Groenoordhallen =

Complex facility in Leiden, Netherlands

Coordinates: 52°10′11″N 4°29′39″E

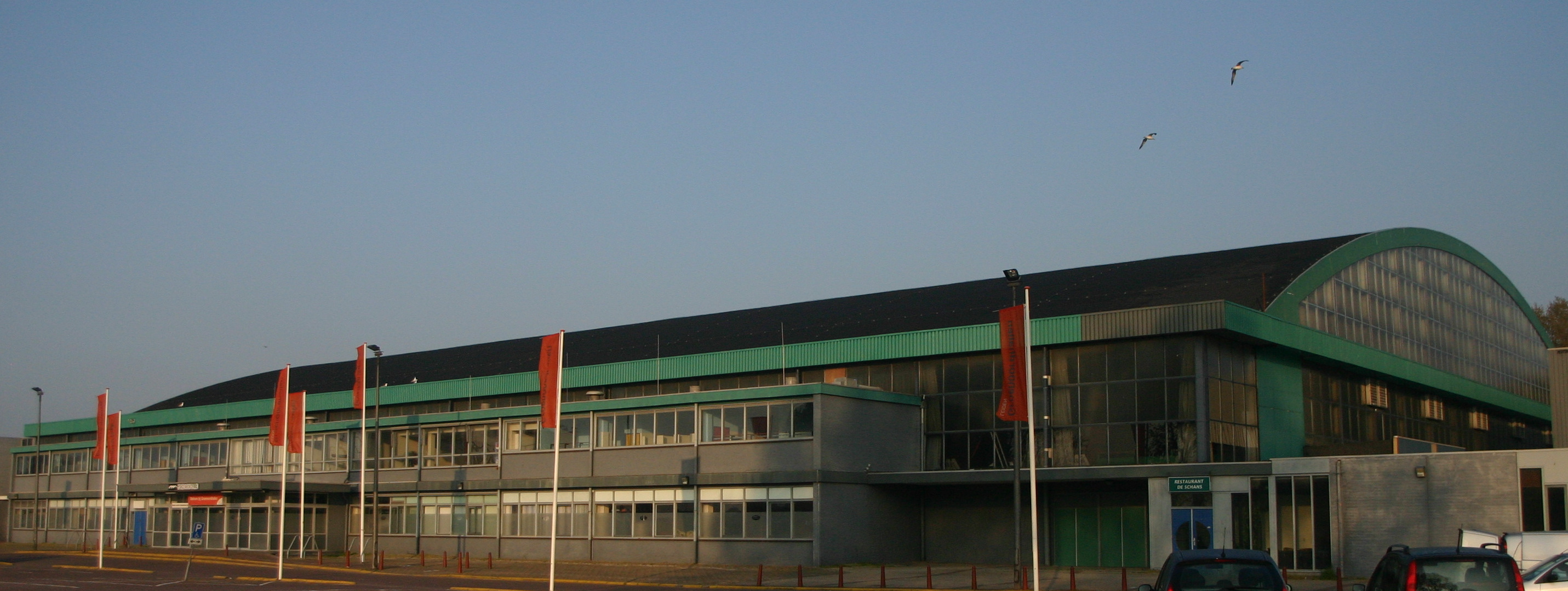
Groenoordhallen in 2009

Groenoordhallen (English: Groenoord Halls) was a building located in Leiden, Netherlands. It was used for concerts and conventions, but one of its main sources of revenue was the cattle market. The closure of that market in 2005 led to its demise. In 2010, the building was demolished; homes and offices are to be built in its place, with bricks and other elements retained from the original structure. Groenoordhallen has hosted artists such as Queen, Def Leppard, Kiss, The Police and U2.
