= Gansett Tribal Rock Festival =

The Gansett Tribal Rock Festival was a series of concerts held at several venues in Boston, Massachusetts and Providence, Rhode Island in 1969 and 1970. The festival concerts featured notable artists such as The Band, Led Zeppelin, Santana, Crosby, Stills, Nash and Young, Dr. John, MC5, Johnny Winter, and Taj Mahal. The venues at which the concerts were performed included Boston College and Rhode Island Auditorium.
