= Sunday Break (1976, Austin, Texas) =

Rock festival

Sunday Break was a rock festival held in Austin, Texas, the first of Mayday Productions, on May 2, 1976.

The event was first scheduled for Saturday, May 1, but was then moved to the morrow Sunday to avoid a conflict with an election. The chosen 130-acre (53 ha) site was located near the northeast corner of the intersection of Interstate Highway 35 and U.S. Highway 290.

The festival featured major acts of the time, such as America, Peter Frampton, Santana, Gary Wright and newly signed Columbia artists Cecilio & Kapono from Hawaii, The promoters had hoped to have The Band, The Beach Boys, Fleetwood Mac, Jefferson Starship, Joni Mitchell, and Neil Young, but their schedules did not allow those to come participate. Also hoped were Paul Simon and Bruce Springsteen, who both declined.

The gross income tallied $532,000, against expenses of $425,000, with an attendance of 56,000 spectators. The concert went well, with traffic flowing easily and medical assistance provided by the Austin YWCA’s Middle Earth program. Police forces were not invited inside the gates.

== Sunday Break II ==
Local cartoonist Jaxon was hired to draw a map of the area for a following edition, named Sunday Break II, which took place on 5 September of the same year, under a severe summer heat, at a location outside of town known as Steiner Ranch near Lake Austin, below Mansfield dam of Lake Travis. The event featured artists such as The Band, Chicago, England Dan & John Ford Coley, Fleetwood Mac, Peter Frampton again, and the Steve Miller Band. The crowd was estimated at 45,000 (for an expected attendance of 100,000); access to the area was seriously limited, unlike at the previous location, with only one road leading in, which got heavily congested, delaying the arrival of spectators. The performers were flown in by helicopter. The event gathered about $350,000 whereas it had allotted $800,000, forcing Mayday Productions in bankruptcy.
