= Akita Prefectural Hall =

Public cultural facility

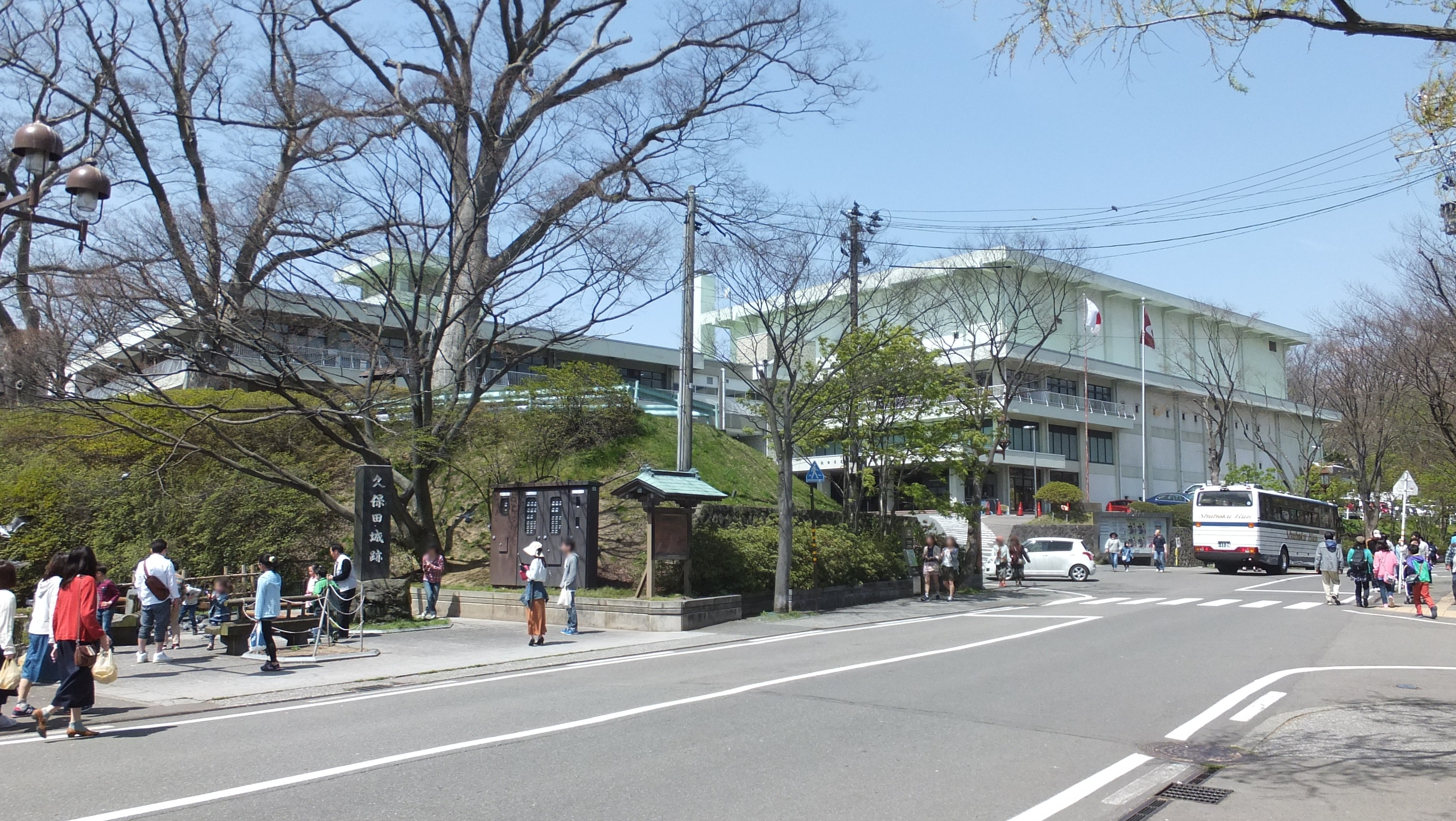
- Akita Kenmin Kaikan, April 2016

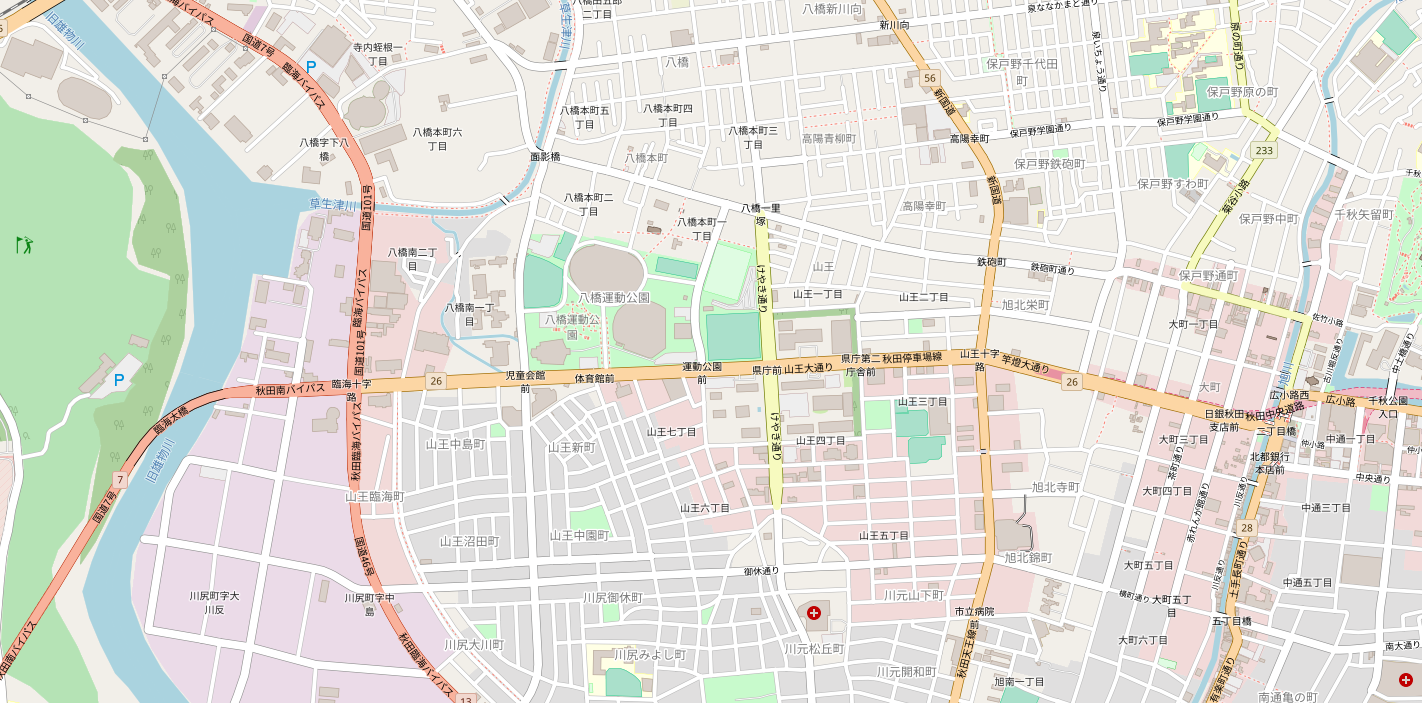
- Location within Akita, Akita Location within Akita Prefecture Location within Japan

General information
- Location: Akita, Japan, 2-52 Senshumeitokumachi. Akitashi 010-0875
- Coordinates: 39°43′10.9″N 140°07′18.7″E
- Opened: 30 September 1961
- Closed: 31 May 2018
- Owner: Akita Prefecture

Technical details
- Floor area: 5,779.79 m^{2}

Other information
- Seating capacity: 1,839

Website
- www.akisouko.com/ken_kai/

The Akita Prefectural Hall (秋田県民会館, Akita Kenminkaikan) was a multi-purpose public cultural facility in Akita, Japan, which operated from 30 April 1961 to 31 May 2018. The main concert hall had a seating capacity of 1,839. Notable past performers include Rainbow.

== Events ==
- Santana 26 November 1974
- Quincy Jones 10 April 1975
- Three Dog Night 6 May1975
- Keith Jarrett 4 June 1975
- Suzi Quatro 7 July 1976
- Santana 22 November 1977
- Rainbow 29 January 1978
- Cheap Trick 26 March 1979
- Yellow Magic Orchestra 1 April 1980
- The Nolans 1980
- The Crusaders
- Chick Corea 2 November 1982
- Gary Moore 15 October 1985
- The Ventures 10 September 1992
- C.J. Lewis 1995
- Cyndi Lauper 26 November 1996
- Bob Dylan 22 February 1997
- Whitesnake 19 September 1997
- Bob Dylan 28 February 2001
- Alanis Morissette 2 October 2002
- Mr. Big 19 April 2011
- Téada 8 April 2014

== See also ==
- Akita City Culture Hall

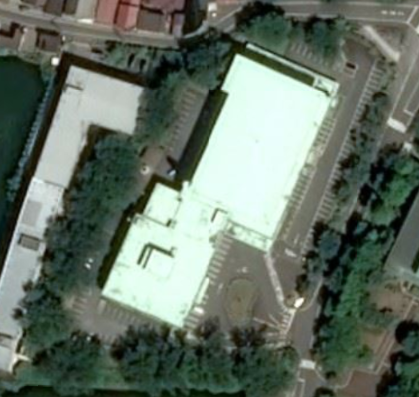
Satellite view
