= List of Santana live performances (1980s) =

Santana is an American rock band, formed in 1966 by the Mexican American guitarist Carlos Santana, which has performed for five decades.

The group's first concert tours were North America, with performances in Europe, where they performed at small and medium-size venues and rock festivals. Following a lineup change in early 1972, they toured the world from 1972 to 1973. During this tour, the band performed at arenas and theaters, while doing several concerts in South America, one of the first tours of the continent by a major American rock act. After a North American tour in 1974, the last remaining members of the group from their famous lineup, Michael Shrieve and José Areas, quit the group, and the band underwent multiple lineup changes during the following years. In the 1970s to the 1980s, the band played at arenas, but mostly theaters and seldom music festivals.

In the 1990s, the group lost their recording contract, but they continued to tour extensively throughout the decade, mostly playing at theaters and amphitheaters. However, the band ended the decade with the Supernatural Tour, a vehicle for their popular 1999 album Supernatural. The 177–date tour was a success with audiences and critics, and the group continued to perform within the 2000s. In the third quarter of 2010, Carlos Santana proposed to drummer Cindy Blackman after her solo on the song "Corazón Espinado", and she became an official member of the band in 2016. The group continues to tour the world to this day.

== Europe Tour '80 (1980) ==
Santana Europe Tour '80
- Tour by Santana
- Associated album: Marathon
- Start date: May 23, 1980
- End date: July 14, 1980
- Legs: 2
- No. of shows: 32

Santana concert chronology
- 1979 tour of Australia, Japan and the United States (1979); Santana Europe Tour '80 (1980); US Tour 1980 (1980)

Santana Europe Tour '80 was a concert tour of Europe by American band Santana in 1980.

=== Tour band ===
The tour band consisted of:

- Alex Ligertwood – lead vocals, rhythm guitar
- Carlos Santana – lead guitar, percussion, vocals
- Richard Baker – keyboards
- David Margen – bass guitar
- Graham Lear – drums
- Armando Peraza – congas, percussion, vocals
- Raul Rekow – congas, bongos, percussion, vocals
- Orestes Vilató – timbales, percussion

=== Set list ===
This set list is representative of the show on July 1. It does not represent all concerts for the duration of the tour.

1. "Hannibal" (Alex Ligertwood, Alan Pasqua, Raul Rekow, Carlos Santana)
2. "All I Ever Wanted" (Ligertwood, Santana, Chris Solberg)
3. "Tales of Kilimanjaro" (Pasqua, Armando Peraza, Rekow, Santana)
4. "Black Magic Woman" (Peter Green)
5. "Gypsy Queen" (Gábor Szabó)
6. "Oye Como Va" (Tito Puente)
7. "Just in Time to See the Sun" (Gregg Rolie, Santana, Michael Shrieve)
8. "Incident at Neshabur" (Alberto Gianquinto, Santana)
9. "Lightning in the Sky" (Santana, Solberg)
10. "Aqua Marine" (Pasqua, Santana)
11. "Savor" (José Areas, David Brown, Michael Carabello, Rolie, Santana, Shrieve)
12. "Jin-go-lo-ba" (Babatunde Olatunji)
13. "You Just Don't Care" (Areas, Brown, Carabello, Rolie, Santana, Shrieve)
14. "Europa (Earth's Cry Heaven's Smile)" (Tom Coster, Santana)
15. "Well All Right" (Norman Petty, Buddy Holly, Jerry Allison, Joe B. Mauldin)
16. "Runnin" (David Margen)
17. "Soul Sacrifice" (Santana, Rolie, Brown, Marcus Malone)
18. "Open Invitation" (Santana, Dennis Lambert, Brian Potter, Greg Walker, Margen)
19. "Samba Pa Ti" (Santana)
20. "She's Not There" (Rod Argent)
21. "Transcendance" (Santana)
22. "Shake Your Moneymaker" (Elmore James)
23. "Evil Ways" (Clarence "Sonny" Henry)

=== Tour dates ===
List of tour dates with date, city, country, venue
Date (1980)	City	Country	Venue
June 2	London	England	Wembley Arena
June 3	London	England	Wembley Arena
June 4	London	England	Wembley Arena
June 6	Leiden	Netherlands	Groenoordhallen
June 7 (2 shows)	Cologne	West Germany	Sporthalle
June 9	Barcelona	Spain	Plaza de toros Monumental de Barcelona
June 11	Mannheim	West Germany	Eisstadion am Friedrichspark
June 12	Dortmund	West Germany	Westfalenhallen
June 13	Kassel	West Germany	Eissporthalle Kassel
June 14	Hanover	West Germany	Eisstadion am Pferdeturm
June 21 (Note: The concert on June 21 was a part of the Knebworth Festival.)	Knebworth	England	Knebworth House
June 22 (Note: The concert on June 22 was a part of the Fête de la Liberté.)	Paris	France	Paris–Le Bourget Airport
June 23	Brussels	Belgium	Forest National
June 24	Bremen	West Germany	Stadthalle Bremen
June 26	Stockholm	Sweden	Gröna Lund
June 27	Kiel	West Germany	Ostseehalle
June 28 (Note: The concert on June 28 was a part of the Roskilde Festival.)	Roskilde	Denmark	Darupvej
June 29 (Note: The concert on June 29 was a part of the Kalvøyafestivalen.)	Oslo	Norway	Kalvøya
July 1	Frankfurt	West Germany	Festhalle Messe Frankfurt
July 2	Zwolle	Netherlands	IJsselhallen
July 4 (Note: The concert on July 4 was a part of the Montreux Jazz Festival.)	Montreux	Switzerland	Casino Barrière de Montreux
July 5	Zürich	Switzerland	Hallenstadion
July 6	Munich	West Germany	Olympiahalle München
July 7	Munich	West Germany	Olympiahalle München
July 8	Vienna	Austria	Praterstadion
July 10	Avignon	France	Parc des Expositions de Chateaublanc
July 11	Fréjus	France	Arènes de Fréjus
July 12	Fréjus	France	Arènes de Fréjus
July 13	Agde	France	Arènes du Cap d'Agde
July 14	Dax	France	Arènes de Dax

== US Tour 1980 (1980) ==
Santana US Tour 1980
- Tour by Santana
- Associated album: Marathon
- Start date: July 30, 1980
- End date: September 13, 1980
- Legs: 1
- No. of shows: 25

Santana concert chronology
- Europe Tour '80 (1980); Santana US Tour 1980 (1980); Zebop! Tour (1981)

Santana US Tour 1980 was a short concert tour of the United States by American rock band Santana.

=== Tour band ===
The tour band consisted of:

- Alex Ligertwood – lead vocals, rhythm guitar
- Carlos Santana – lead guitar, percussion, vocals
- Richard Baker – keyboards
- David Margen – bass guitar
- Graham Lear – drums
- Armando Peraza – congas, percussion, vocals
- Raul Rekow – congas, bongos, percussion, vocals
- Orestes Vilató – timbales, percussion

=== Set list ===
The tour lasted from July 30, 1980, at the Blossom Music Center in Cuyahoga Falls, Ohio, to September 13, 1980, at the Hearst Greek Theatre in Berkeley, California. Taken from September 5, a common set list was as follows:

1. "All I Ever Wanted" (Alex Ligertwood, Carlos Santana, Chris Solberg)
2. "Incident at Neshabur" (Alberto Gianquinto, Santana)
3. "Tales of Kilimanjaro" (Alan Pasqua, Armando Peraza, Raul Rekow, Santana)
4. "Black Magic Woman" (Peter Green)
5. "Gypsy Queen" (Gábor Szabó)
6. "Lightning in the Sky" (Santana, Solberg)
7. "Europa (Earth's Cry Heaven's Smile)" (Tom Coster, Santana)
8. "Savor" (José Areas, David Brown, Michael Carabello, Gregg Rolie, Santana, Michael Shrieve)
9. "Jin-go-lo-ba" (Babatunde Olatunji)
10. "Well All Right" (Norman Petty, Buddy Holly, Jerry Allison, Joe B. Mauldin)
11. "Runnin" (Margen)
12. "Soul Sacrifice" (Santana, Rolie, Brown, Marcus Malone)
13. "Concierto de Aranjuez" (Joaquín Rodrigo)
14. "Open Invitation" (Santana, Dennis Lambert, Brian Potter, Greg Walker, David Margen)
15. "She's Not There" (Rod Argent)
16. "Transcendance" (Santana)
17. "Whole Lotta Love" (John Bonham, Willie Dixon, John Paul Jones, Jimmy Page, Robert Plant)
18. "Evil Ways" (Clarence "Sonny" Henry)

=== Tour dates ===
List of tour dates with date, city, country, venue
Date (1980)	City	Country	Venue
July 30	Cuyahoga Falls	United States	Blossom Music Center
July 31	Clarkston	United States	Pine Knob Music Theatre
August 2	South Yarmouth	United States	Cape Cod Coliseum
August 3	Shelton	United States	Pinecrest Country Club
August 5	Albany	United States	Palace Theatre
August 7	Tarrytown	United States	Westchester Premiere Theater
August 8	Philadelphia	United States	Mann Music Center
August 9	Columbia	United States	Merriweather Post Pavilion
August 10	Asbury Park	United States	Asbury Park Convention Hall
August 12	Chicago	United States	Poplar Creek Music Theatre
August 13	Kansas City	United States	Memorial Hall
August 15	St. Louis	United States	Kiel Opera House
August 16	St. Louis	United States	Kiel Opera House
August 17	Oklahoma City	United States	Zoo Amphitheatre
August 30	Denver	United States	Denver Coliseum
August 31 (Note: The concert on August 31 was a part of the Stadium Jam.)	Albuquerque	United States	Albuquerque Sports Stadium
September 1	El Paso	United States	Civic Center Theater
September 3	Tucson	United States	Tucson Community Center
September 5	San Diego	United States	Open Air Theatre
September 6	Phoenix	United States	Arizona Veterans Memorial Coliseum
September 8	Los Angeles	United States	Universal Amphitheatre
September 9	Los Angeles	United States	Universal Amphitheatre
September 10	Los Angeles	United States	Universal Amphitheatre
September 12	Santa Barbara	United States	Santa Barbara Bowl
September 13	Berkeley	United States	William Randolph Hearst Greek Theatre

=== Box office score data ===
List of box office score data with date, city, venue, attendance, gross, references
Date (1980)	City	Venue	Attendance	Gross	Ref(s)
August 7	Tarrytown, United States	Westchester Premiere Theater	3,574 / 3,574	$42,713	
August 8	Philadelphia, United States	Mann Music Center	9,934	$79,459	
August 10	Asbury Park, United States	Asbury Park Convention Hall	3,927 / 3,927	$39,417	
August 13	Kansas City, United States	Memorial Hall	2,715	$25,792	
August 15	St. Louis, United States	Kiel Opera House	7,114 / 7,114	$65,875	
August 16	St. Louis, United States	Kiel Opera House	7,114 / 7,114	$65,875	
August 17	Oklahoma City, United States	Zoo Amphitheatre	4,276	$35,640	
August 30	Denver, United States	Denver Coliseum	9,514 / 9,514	$99,300	
September 5	San Diego, United States	Open Air Theatre	4,100 / 4,100	$43,801	
September 12	Santa Barbara, United States	Santa Barbara Bowl	4,646 / 4,646	$42,901	
TOTAL			49,800	$474,988	

== Zebop! Tour (1981) ==
Zebop! Tour
- Tour by Santana
- Associated album: Zebop!
- Start date: February 1, 1981
- End date: December 1, 1981
- Legs: 5
- No. of shows: 83 in North America; 33 in Europe; 5 in Asia; 121 in total

Santana concert chronology
- US Tour 1980 (1980); Zebop! Tour (1981); Shangó Tour (1982–83)

The Zebop! Tour (also known as The Zebop Concert '81) was the sixteenth concert tour by Santana supporting the Zebop! album.

=== History ===
Santana spent 1981 promoting Zebop! by touring in North America, Europe, and Asia. As well as playing at sporting venues and theaters, the group performed at nightclubs. The group started the year off with a huge 76-show tour of North America, followed by a brief tour of Japan with Masayoshi Takanaka. The band then flew to the United States to do seven concerts in California, and a tour of Europe soon followed. After the European tour concluded, the group opened for the Rolling Stones at the Pontiac Silverdome in Pontiac, Michigan, in December.

During the Japanese tour, after visiting the Zōjō-ji temple in Tokyo, Carlos Santana's wife Deborah confessed to him that in early 1976, their guru Sri Chinmoy asked her to get an abortion. Carlos was saddened by this news, and they both parted ways with Chinmoy. Deborah's sister Kitsaun King also left the guru's path, and Dipti Nivas, a restaurant in San Francisco the Santanas helped create in September 1973, was sold.

=== Live releases ===
Live material from 1981 has appeared on the following:

- The band's concert on July 4 at the Cape Cod Coliseum in South Yarmouth, Massachusetts, was broadcast nationwide on radio and subsequently became a popular bootleg recording.
- "I Love You Much Too Much" from the show of August 12 at the Greek Theatre in Los Angeles was featured on the 1988 video Viva Santana! An Intimate Conversation With Carlos Santana.

=== Tour band ===
- Alex Ligertwood – lead vocals, rhythm guitar
- Carlos Santana – lead guitar, percussion, vocals
- Richard Baker – keyboards
- David Margen – bass guitar
- Graham Lear – drums
- Armando Peraza – congas, percussion, vocals
- Raul Rekow – congas, bongos, percussion, vocals
- Orestes Vilató – timbales, percussion

=== Reception ===
The concert on July 1 at Kleinhans Music Hall in Buffalo was given a positive review by Billboard.

=== Set list ===
An average set list of this tour is as follows:

1. "All I Ever Wanted" (Alex Ligertwood, Carlos Santana, Chris Solberg)
2. "Primera Invasion" (Graham Lear, David Margen, Alan Pasqua, Santana)
3. "Searchin'" (Ligertwood, Santana, Solberg)
4. "Tales of Kilimanjaro" (Pasqua, Armando Peraza, Raul Rekow, Santana)
5. "Black Magic Woman" (Peter Green)
6. "Gypsy Queen" (Gábor Szabó)
7. "Well All Right" (Norman Petty, Buddy Holly, Jerry Allison, Joe B. Mauldin)
8. "E Papa Ré" (Santana, Richard Baker, Margen, Orestes Vilató, Ligertwood)
9. "Europa (Earth's Cry Heaven's Smile)" (Tom Coster, Santana)
10. "Savor" (José Areas, David Brown, Michael Carabello, Gregg Rolie, Santana, Michael Shrieve)
11. "Jin-go-lo-ba" (Babatunde Olatunji)
12. "Incident at Neshabur" (Alberto Gianquinto, Santana)
13. "Body Surfing" (Santana, Ligertwood)
14. "Soul Sacrifice" (Santana, Rolie, Brown, Marcus Malone)
15. "Runnin" (Margen)
16. "Open Invitation" (Santana, Dennis Lambert, Brian Potter, Greg Walker, Margen)
17. "She's Not There" (Rod Argent)
18. "The Sensitive Kind" (J.J. Cale)
19. "American Gypsy" (Russ Ballard, Lear, Ligertwood)
20. "Shake Your Moneymaker" (Elmore James)

=== Tour dates ===
==== North American leg (January 12 – July 11) ====
List of tour dates with date, city, country, venue
Date (1981)	City	Country	Venue
February 1	San Francisco	United States	Old Waldorf
February 2	San Francisco	United States	Old Waldorf
February 3	San Francisco	United States	Old Waldorf
February 4	San Francisco	United States	Old Waldorf
February 5	San Francisco	United States	Old Waldorf
February 8	Davis	United States	Freeborn Hall
February 12 (2 shows)	Denver	United States	Rainbow Music Hall
February 13	Boulder	United States	Balch Fieldhouse
February 14	Pueblo	United States	Massari Arena
February 16	Colorado Springs	United States	Clune Arena
February 18	Salt Lake City	United States	Symphony Hall
February 21 (2 shows)	Santa Cruz	United States	Santa Cruz Civic Auditorium
February 22	San Luis Obispo	United States	Mustang Stadium
February 23	Salinas	United States	Sherwood Hall
February 25	San Jose	United States	San Jose Civic Auditorium
February 27	Petaluma	United States	Petaluma Veterans Memorial Hall
March 13	Anaheim	United States	Anaheim Convention Center
March 14	Anaheim	United States	Anaheim Convention Center
March 16	Los Angeles	United States	Reseda Country Club
March 17	Las Vegas	United States	Aladdin Theatre for the Performing Arts
March 18	Reno	United States	Reno Centennial Coliseum
March 24	Odessa	United States	Ector County Coliseum
March 25	Austin	United States	Frank C. Erwin Jr. Special Events Center
March 27	Dallas	United States	Dallas Convention Center
March 28	Houston	United States	Sam Houston Coliseum
March 29	Mobile	United States	Mobile Municipal Auditorium
March 31	New Orleans	United States	Saenger Theatre
April 2	Coral Gables	United States	Norman A. Whitten University Center
April 3	Sunrise	United States	Sunrise Musical Theater
April 4	Tampa	United States	Curtis Hixon Hall
April 18	San Juan	Puerto Rico	Roberto Clemente Coliseum
April 19	San Juan	Puerto Rico	Roberto Clemente Coliseum
April 21	Washington, D.C.	United States	DAR Constitution Hall
April 22	Richmond	United States	The Mosque
April 24 (Note: The concert on April 24 was a part of the Spring Carnival Concert.)	Pittsburgh	United States	Carnegie-Mellon University Gym
April 25	Syracuse	United States	Carrier Dome
April 26	Albany	United States	Palace Theatre
April 28	Plattsburgh	United States	SUNY Plattsburgh Field House
April 29	Potsdam	United States	Walker Arena
May 1	Burlington	United States	Roy L. Patrick Gymnasium
May 2 (2 shows)	Tarrytown	United States	Westchester Premiere Theater
May 3	Stony Brook	United States	Stony Brook Gymnasium
May 5	New York City	United States	The Savoy
May 6	Buffalo	United States	Kleinhans Music Hall
May 8	Boston	United States	Orpheum Theatre
May 9	Amherst	United States	Curry Hicks Physical Education Building
May 10	State College	United States	Recreation Building
May 28	Columbus	United States	Veterans Memorial Coliseum
May 29	Indianapolis	United States	Market Square Arena
May 30	St. Louis	United States	Checkerdome
June 1	Atlanta	United States	Fox Theatre
June 3	Clarkston	United States	Pine Knob Music Theatre
June 4	Clarkston	United States	Pine Knob Music Theatre
June 5	Clarkston	United States	Pine Knob Music Theatre
June 6	Clarkston	United States	Pine Knob Music Theatre
June 7	Chicago	United States	Poplar Creek Music Theater
June 9	New Haven	United States	New Haven Veterans Memorial Coliseum
June 10	Boston	United States	Orpheum Theatre
June 12	Philadelphia	United States	Mann Music Center
June 13	Cuyahoga Falls	United States	Blossom Music Center
June 26	Pittsburgh	United States	Civic Arena
June 27	Pittsburgh	United States	Stanley Theatre
June 29	Montreal	Canada	Montreal Forum
June 30	Toronto	Canada	Maple Leaf Gardens
July 1	Buffalo	United States	Kleinhans Music Hall
July 3	Portland	United States	Cumberland County Civic Center
July 4	South Yarmouth	United States	Cape Cod Coliseum
July 6	Virginia Beach	United States	Virginia Beach Pavilion
July 7	West Orange	United States	South Mountain Music Fair
July 8 (Note: The concert on July 8 was a part of the Dr. Pepper Central Park Music Festival.)	New York City	United States	Pier 84
July 10	Columbia	United States	Merriweather Post Pavilion
July 11	Uniondale	United States	Nassau Veterans Memorial Coliseum

==== Japanese leg (August 2–7) ====
List of tour dates with date, city, country, venue
Date (1981)	City	Country	Venue
August 2 (Note: The concert on August 2 was a part of the Pioneer Live Special.)	Yokohama	Japan	Yokohama Stadium
August 3	Kyoto	Japan	Kyoto Kaikan
August 4	Nagoya	Japan	Nagoya Civic Assembly Hall
August 6	Osaka	Japan	Festival Hall
August 7	Fukuoka	Japan	Fukuoka Sports Center

==== U.S. leg (August 11 – September 2) ====
List of tour dates with date, city, country, venue
Date (1981)	City	Country	Venue
August 11	Los Angeles	United States	Greek Theatre
August 12	Los Angeles	United States	Greek Theatre
August 13	Los Angeles	United States	Greek Theatre
August 14	Los Angeles	United States	Greek Theatre
August 15	Berkeley	United States	William Randolph Hearst Greek Theatre
August 16	Sacramento	United States	Charles C. Hughes Stadium
September 2	Sacramento	United States	California Exposition

==== European leg (September 11 – November 15) ====
List of tour dates with date, city, country, venue
Date (1981)	City	Country	Venue
September 11	Fréjus	France	Arènes de Fréjus
September 12	Agde	France	Arènes du Cap d'Agde
September 13	San Sebastián	Spain	Velódromo de Anoeta
September 15	Madrid	Spain	Estadio Román Valero
September 16	Valencia	Spain	Plaza de Toros de Valencia
September 18	Annecy	France	Parc des Sports
September 19	Munich	West Germany	Olympiahalle München
September 20	Cologne	West Germany	Sporthalle
September 21	Essen	West Germany	Grugahalle
September 23	Saint-Ouen	France	Grande Nef de l'Île-des-Vannes
September 24	Saint-Ouen	France	Grande Nef de l'Île-des-Vannes
September 26	West Berlin	West Germany	Waldbühne
September 28	Hanover	West Germany	Eilenriedehalle
September 29	Copenhagen	Denmark	Forum Copenhagen
October 1	Drammen	Norway	Drammenshallen
October 2	Stockholm	Sweden	Johanneshovs Isstadion
October 3	Gothenburg	Sweden	Scandinavium
October 24 (2 shows)	Birmingham	England	Birmingham Odeon
October 26	London	England	Royal Albert Hall
October 27	London	England	Royal Albert Hall
October 28	London	England	Royal Albert Hall
October 31	Brussels	Belgium	Forest National
November 1	Strasbourg	France	Rhénus Sport
November 2	Frankfurt	West Germany	Alte Oper
November 4	Eppelheim	West Germany	Rhein-Neckar-Halle
November 6	Vienna	Austria	Wiener Stadthalle
November 7	Passau	West Germany	Nibelungenhalle
November 8	Zürich	Switzerland	Hallenstadion
November 10	Lyon	France	Palais des Sports de Gerland
November 12	Böblingen	West Germany	Sporthalle
November 13	Bremen	West Germany	Stadthalle Bremen
November 15	Rotterdam	Netherlands	Sportpaleis

==== U.S. show (December 1) ====
List of tour dates with date, city, country, venue
Date (1981)	City	Country	Venue
December 1	Pontiac	United States	Pontiac Silverdome

=== Box office score data ===
List of box office score data with date, city, venue, attendance, gross, references
Date (1981)	City	Venue	Attendance	Gross	Ref(s)
February 12 (2 shows)	Denver, United States	Rainbow Music Hall	2,900 / 2,900	$29,072	
February 13	Boulder, United States	Balch Fieldhouse	4,369	$42,289	
February 14	Pueblo, United States	Massari Arena	3,388	$31,752	
February 18	Salt Lake City, United States	Symphony Hall	2,742 / 2,742	$25,508	
February 21 (2 shows)	Santa Cruz, United States	Santa Cruz Civic Auditorium	3,928 / 3,928	$39,349	
February 23	Salinas, United States	Sherwood Hall	1,600 / 1,600	$16,000	
February 25	San Jose, United States	San Jose Civic Auditorium	3,200 / 3,200	$30,400	
March 13	Anaheim, United States	Anaheim Convention Center	14,226 / 14,226	$129,848	
March 14	Anaheim, United States	Anaheim Convention Center	14,226 / 14,226	$129,848	
March 17	Las Vegas, United States	Aladdin Theatre for the Performing Arts	4,074	$44,074	
April 4	Tampa, United States	Curtis Hixon Hall	7,535 / 7,535	$67,815	
April 25	Syracuse, United States	Carrier Dome	15,213 / 15,213	$113,700	
May 2 (2 shows)	Tarrytown, United States	Westchester Premiere Theater	6,774	$79,500	
May 30	St. Louis, United States	Checkerdome	10,412 / 10,412	$97,060	
June 9	New Haven, United States	New Haven Veterans Memorial Coliseum	7,800	$70,316	
June 10	Boston, United States	Orpheum Theatre	2,800	$28,760	
June 12	Philadelphia, United States	Mann Music Center	8,117	$72,765	
July 1	Buffalo, United States	Kleinhans Music Hall	2,994 / 2,994	$29,020	
July 4	South Yarmouth, United States	Cape Cod Coliseum	7,200 / 7,200	$68,588	
August 15	Berkeley, United States	William Randolph Hearst Greek Theatre	8,500 / 8,500	$89,250	
August 16	Sacramento, United States	Charles C. Hughes Stadium	21,041	$331,577	
December 1	Pontiac, United States	Pontiac Silverdome	76,348 / 76,348	$1,145,000	
TOTAL			215,161	$2,581,643	

== Shangó Tour (1982–1983) ==
Shangó Tour
- Tour by Santana
- Associated album: Shangó
- Start date: May 30, 1982
- End date: May 13, 1983
- Legs: 2
- No. of shows: 65 in North America; 33 in Europe; 98 in total

Santana concert chronology
- Zebop! Tour (1981); Shangó Tour (1982–83); Havana Moon Tour (1983)

The Shangó Tour was the seventeenth concert tour by Santana supporting their album Shangó.

=== Live releases ===
Live material from this tour has appeared on the following releases:

- "All I Ever Wanted", "Black Magic Woman" and "Gypsy Queen" from August 20, 1982, at the Altos de Chavón Amphitheater in La Romana, Dominican Republic were featured on the 1988 video Viva Santana! An Intimate Conversation With Carlos Santana.
- The band's entire concert on September 4, 1982, as a part of the US Festival was released in 2019 as Santana: Live at US Festival.
- "Black Magic Woman", "Gypsy Queen" and "Oye Como Va" on the 1988 compilation album Viva Santana! are from September 22, 1982, at the Montreal Forum in Montreal, Canada.
- "Abi Cama", "Vilató" and "Paris Finale" from April 18, 19 or 20, 1983, at Grande Nef de l'Île-des-Vannes in Saint-Ouen, France, also appear on Viva Santana!.

=== Tour band ===
==== 1982 tour band ====
- Alex Ligertwood – lead vocals, rhythm guitar
- Carlos Santana – lead guitar, percussion, vocals
- Richard Baker – keyboards
- David Margen – bass guitar
- Graham Lear – drums
- Armando Peraza – congas, percussion, vocals
- Raul Rekow – congas, bongos, percussion, vocals
- Orestes Vilató – timbales, percussion

==== 1983 tour band ====
- Greg Walker – lead vocals, percussion
- Carlos Santana – lead guitar, percussion, vocals
- Tom Coster – keyboards
- Chester D. Thompson – keyboards
- Keith Jones – bass guitar
- Graham Lear – drums
- Armando Peraza – congas, percussion, vocals
- Raul Rekow – congas, bongos, percussion, vocals
- Orestes Vilató – timbales, percussion

=== Typical set lists ===
==== May 1982—March 1983: North American tour ====
Santana embarked on a 65-date North American tour through all of 1982 and a small part of 1983, beginning on May 29, 1982, at the Kabuki Night Club in San Francisco and ending on March 3, 1983, at the same venue. During this tour, the band headlined large music festivals such as the two-day Texxas Jam '82 (to a crowd of 64,945 and 65,000 fans each), Day on the Green (before a crowd of exactly 57,500 people), and Summerfest, appeared at the Concert for the Americas at the Altos de Chavón Amphitheater in La Romana, Dominican Republic, where their set was cut short due to rain, and opened for British rock band The Who on September 25, 1982, during their farewell tour, as documented by Billboard. An average set list for this outing is as follows:

1. "Primera Invasion" (Graham Lear, David Margen, Alan Pasqua, Carlos Santana)
2. "Searchin'" (Alex Ligertwood, Santana, Chris Solberg)
3. "The Nile" (Santana, Ligertwood, Gregg Rolie)
4. "Black Magic Woman" (Peter Green)
5. "Gypsy Queen" (Gábor Szabó)
6. "Oye Como Va" (Tito Puente)
7. "Oxun (Oshūn)" (Santana, Ligertwood, Rolie, Lear, Armando Peraza, Raul Rekow, Orestes Vilató)
8. "Well All Right" (Norman Petty, Buddy Holly, Jerry Allison, Joe B. Mauldin)
9. "Incident at Neshabur" (Alberto Gianquinto, Santana)
10. "Nowhere to Run" (Russ Ballard)
11. "Savor" (José Areas, David Brown, Michael Carabello, Rolie, Santana, Michael Shrieve)
12. "Body Surfing" (Santana, Ligertwood)
13. "Jin-go-lo-ba" (Babatunde Olatunji)
14. "Hold On" (Ian Thomas)
15. "Open Invitation" (Santana, Dennis Lambert, Brian Potter, Greg Walker, Margen)
16. "She's Not There" (Rod Argent)
17. "American Gypsy" (Ballard, Lear, Ligertwood)
18. "Europa (Earth's Cry Heaven's Smile)" (Tom Coster, Santana)
19. "Shangó" (Rekow, Vilató, Peraza)

==== March—May 1983: European tour ====
The European tour lasted from March 11, 1983, at the Carl-Diem-Halle in Würzburg, West Germany to May 13, 1983, at Budapest Sportcsarnok in Budapest, Hungary. This set list is representative of the show on April 26. It does not represent all concerts for the duration of the tour.

1. "Nowhere to Run" (Ballard)
2. "Hold On" (Thomas)
3. "Tales of Kilimanjaro" (Pasqua, Peraza, Rekow, Santana)
4. "Black Magic Woman" (Green)
5. "Gypsy Queen" (Szabó)
6. "Oye Como Va" (Puente)
7. "Incident at Neshabur" (Gianquinto, Santana)
8. "Watch Your Step" (Ricky Lee Phelps, Doug Phelps)
9. "Aqua Marine" (Pasqua, Santana)
10. "Brotherhood" (David Sancious, Santana, Chester D. Thompson)
11. "That's the Way God Planned It" (Billy Preston)
12. "Savor" (Areas, Brown, Carabello, Rolie, Santana, Shrieve)
13. "Jin-go-lo-ba" (Olatunji)
14. "Havana Moon" (Chuck Berry)
15. "Soul Sacrifice" (Santana, Rolie, Brown, Marcus Malone)
16. "Concierto de Aranjuez" (Joaquín Rodrigo)
17. "Open Invitation" (Santana, Lambert, Potter, Walker, Margen)
18. "She's Not There" (Argent)
19. "Marbles" (John McLaughlin)
20. "American Gypsy" (Ballard, Lear, Ligertwood)
21. "Europa (Earth's Cry Heaven's Smile)" (Coster, Santana)
22. "Shangó" (Rekow, Vilató, Peraza)
23. "Super Boogie"
24. "Shake Your Moneymaker" (Elmore James)

=== Tour dates ===
==== North American leg (May 29, 1982 – March 3, 1983) ====
List of tour dates with date, city, country, venue
Date	City	Country	Venue
May 29, 1982	San Francisco	United States	Kabuki Night Club
June 2, 1982	Los Angeles	United States	Greek Theatre
June 3, 1982	Los Angeles	United States	Greek Theatre
June 4, 1982	Los Angeles	United States	Greek Theatre
June 5, 1982	Los Angeles	United States	Greek Theatre
June 6, 1982	Los Angeles	United States	Greek Theatre
June 12, 1982 (Note: The concerts on June 12–13, 1982 were a part of the Texxas World Music Festival '82.)	Dallas	United States	Cotton Bowl
June 13, 1982	Houston	United States	Houston Astrodome
June 16, 1982	Stateline	United States	Sahara Tahoe
June 17, 1982	Stateline	United States	Sahara Tahoe
June 18, 1982	Stateline	United States	Sahara Tahoe
June 19, 1982	Stateline	United States	Sahara Tahoe
June 26, 1982 (Note: The concert on June 26, 1982, was a part of Day on the Green.)	Oakland	United States	Oakland–Alameda County Coliseum
June 29, 1982	San Francisco	United States	Warfield Theatre
June 30, 1982 (Note: The concert on June 30, 1982, was a part of Summerfest.)	Milwaukee	United States	Henry Maier Festival Park
July 2, 1982	Clarkston	United States	Pine Knob Music Theatre
July 3, 1982	Clarkston	United States	Pine Knob Music Theatre
July 4, 1982	Clarkston	United States	Pine Knob Music Theatre
July 5, 1982	Clarkston	United States	Pine Knob Music Theatre
July 9, 1982	Chicago	United States	Poplar Creek Music Theatre
July 10, 1982	Bloomington	United States	Met Center
July 12, 1982	Cuyahoga Falls	United States	Blossom Music Center
July 20, 1982	San Francisco	United States	Old Waldorf
July 30, 1982	New Haven	United States	New Haven Veterans Memorial Coliseum
July 31, 1982	Columbia	United States	Merriweather Post Pavilion
August 1, 1982	South Yarmouth	United States	Cape Cod Coliseum
August 2, 1982	Boston	United States	Boston Common
August 4, 1982	Philadelphia	United States	Mann Music Center
August 6, 1982	Hempstead	United States	Calderone Concert Hall
August 7, 1982	Woodridge	United States	Music Mountain
August 9, 1982	Saratoga Springs	United States	Saratoga Performing Arts Center
August 10, 1982	Darien Center	United States	Lakeside Amphitheater
August 11, 1982	Pittsburgh	United States	Civic Arena
August 13, 1982	Atlanta	United States	Fox Theatre
August 14, 1982	Tampa	United States	USF Sun Dome
August 15, 1982	Sunrise	United States	Sunrise Musical Theater
August 20, 1982 (Note: The concert on August 20, 1982, was a part of Concert for the Americas.)	La Romana	Dominican Republic	Altos de Chavón Amphitheater
August 28, 1982	Sacramento	United States	Cal Expo Amphitheatre
September 3, 1982	Santa Barbara	United States	Santa Barbara Bowl
September 4, 1982 (Note: The concert on September 4, 1982, was a part of the US Festival.)	San Bernardino	United States	Glen Helen Pavilion
September 5, 1982	Berkeley	United States	William Randolph Hearst Greek Theatre
September 8, 1982	Morrison	United States	Red Rocks Amphitheatre
September 17, 1982	Amherst	United States	Curry Hicks Physical Education Building
September 18, 1982	New York City	United States	Madison Square Garden
September 20, 1982	Ottawa	Canada	Ottawa Civic Centre
September 22, 1982	Montreal	Canada	Montreal Forum
September 24, 1982	Albany	United States	Palace Theatre
September 25, 1982	Philadelphia	United States	John F. Kennedy Stadium
September 26, 1982	State College	United States	Recreation Building
September 29, 1982	Merrillville	United States	Holiday Star Theatre
October 1, 1982	Kansas City	United States	Municipal Auditorium
October 2, 1982	St. Louis	United States	Checkerdome
October 3, 1982	St. Louis	United States	Checkerdome
October 28, 1982	San Antonio	United States	Convention Center Arena
October 29, 1982	Dallas	United States	Reunion Arena
October 30, 1982	Austin	United States	Frank C. Erwin Jr. Special Events Center
October 31, 1982	Houston	United States	The Summit
November 2, 1982	Corpus Christi	United States	Memorial Coliseum
November 5, 1982	Albuquerque	United States	Tingley Coliseum
November 6, 1982	El Paso	United States	El Paso County Coliseum
November 7, 1982	Tempe	United States	Grady Gammage Memorial Auditorium
November 12, 1982	Portland	United States	Paramount Theatre
November 13, 1982	Seattle	United States	Seattle Center Coliseum
November 27, 1982	San Juan	Puerto Rico	Roberto Clemente Coliseum
March 3, 1983	San Francisco	United States	Kabuki Night Club

==== European leg (March 11, 1983 – May 13, 1983) ====
List of tour dates with date, city, country, venue
Date	City	Country	Venue
March 11, 1983	Würzburg	West Germany	Carl-Diem-Halle
March 12, 1983	Frankfurt	West Germany	Festhalle Messe Frankfurt
March 13, 1983	Hanover	West Germany	Eilenriedehalle
March 14, 1983	West Berlin	West Germany	Deutschlandhalle
March 16, 1983	Lille	France	Hall des Expositions Foire de Lille
March 18, 1983	Nantes	France	Parc des Expositions de la Beaujoire
March 19, 1983	Orléans	France	Parc des Expositions et des Congrès d'Orléans
March 20, 1983	Strasbourg	France	Rhénus Sport
March 22, 1983	Copenhagen	Denmark	Brøndbyhallen
March 24, 1983	Drammen	Norway	Drammenshallen
March 25, 1983	Gothenburg	Sweden	Scandinavium
March 26, 1983	Stockholm	Sweden	Johanneshovs Isstadion
March 28, 1983	Helsinki	Finland	Helsinki Ice Hall
March 29, 1983	Cologne	West Germany	Sporthalle
March 31, 1983	Lyon	France	Palais des Sports de Gerland
April 1, 1983	Toulouse	France	Palais des Sports
April 2, 1983	Avignon	France	Parc des Expositions de Chateaublanc
April 18, 1983	Saint-Ouen	France	Grande Nef de l'Île-des-Vannes
April 19, 1983	Saint-Ouen	France	Grande Nef de l'Île-des-Vannes
April 20, 1983	Saint-Ouen	France	Grande Nef de l'Île-des-Vannes
April 21, 1983	Brussels	Belgium	Forest National
April 22, 1983	Rotterdam	Netherlands	Sportpaleis
April 23, 1983	Bremen	West Germany	Stadthalle Bremen
April 26, 1983	Rome	Italy	Palazzo dello Sport
April 27, 1983	Rome	Italy	Palazzo dello Sport
April 28, 1983	Genoa	Italy	Palasport di Genova
April 30, 1983	Dortmund	West Germany	Westfalenhallen
May 2, 1983	London	England	Royal Albert Hall
May 3, 1983	London	England	Royal Albert Hall
May 4, 1983	London	England	Royal Albert Hall
May 6, 1983	Ludwigshafen	West Germany	Friedrich-Ebert-Halle
May 7, 1983	Zürich	Switzerland	Hallenstadion
May 8, 1983	Zürich	Switzerland	Hallenstadion
May 11, 1983	Munich	West Germany	Olympiahalle München
May 12, 1983	Vienna	Austria	Wiener Stadthalle
May 13, 1983	Budapest	Hungary	Budapest Sportcsarnok

=== Box office score data ===
List of box office score data with date, city, venue, attendance, gross, references
Date	City	Venue	Attendance	Gross	Ref(s)
June 12, 1982	Dallas, United States	Cotton Bowl	64,945 / 70,000	$1,199,310	
June 13, 1982	Houston, United States	Houston Astrodome	65,000 / 65,000	$1,160,504	
June 26, 1982	Oakland, United States	Oakland–Alameda County Coliseum	57,500 / 57,500	$957,851	
July 10, 1982	Bloomington, United States	Met Center	4,443 / 5,000	$46,074	
July 30, 1982	New Haven, United States	New Haven Veterans Memorial Coliseum	7,186 / 10,000	$73,382	
August 28, 1982	Sacramento, United States	Cal Expo Amphitheatre	24,583 / 25,000	$372,144	
September 5, 1982	Berkeley, United States	William Randolph Hearst Greek Theatre	8,500 / 8,500	$99,056	
September 25, 1982	Philadelphia, United States	John F. Kennedy Stadium	91,451 / 91,451	$1,440,353	
October 28, 1982	San Antonio, United States	Convention Center Arena	5,949 / 8,300	$52,448	
October 29, 1982	Dallas, United States	Reunion Arena	5,925 / 9,300	$49,066	
October 30, 1982	Austin, United States	Frank C. Erwin Jr. Special Events Center	4,500 / 7,252	$44,018	
November 5, 1982	Albuquerque, United States	Tingley Coliseum	7,468 / 10,500	$73,180	
TOTAL			347,450 / 367,803 (94%)	$5,567,386	

== Havana Moon Tour (1983) ==
Havana Moon Tour
- Tour by Santana
- Associated album: Havana Moon
- Start date: July 3, 1983
- End date: October 21, 1983
- Legs: 3
- No. of shows: 26 in North America; 12 in Asia; 2 in Oceania; 40 in total

Santana concert chronology
- Shangó Tour (1982–83); Havana Moon Tour (1983); Bob Dylan/Santana European Tour 1984 (1984)

The Havana Moon Tour was the eighteenth concert tour by Santana in 1983, supporting leader Carlos Santana's solo album Havana Moon.

=== Tour band ===
- Greg Walker – lead vocals, percussion
- Carlos Santana – guitar, percussion, vocals
- Tom Coster – keyboards
- Chester D. Thompson – keyboards
- Keith Jones – bass guitar
- Graham Lear – drums
- Armando Peraza – congas, percussion
- Raul Rekow – congas, bongos, percussion, backing vocals
- Orestes Vilató – timbales, percussion

=== Typical set lists ===
==== Japan and Hong Kong ====
Santana did an Asian tour from July 3 at the Yokohama Cultural Gymnasium in Yokohama, Japan to July 19 at Queen Elizabeth Stadium in Wan Chai, Hong Kong. A typical set list is from July 19:

1. "Batuka" (José Areas, David Brown, Michael Carabello, Gregg Rolie, Michael Shrieve)
2. "No One to Depend On" (Carabello, Coke Escovedo, Rolie, Willie Bobo, Melvin Lastie)
3. "Taboo" (Areas, Rolie)
4. "Hold On" (Ian Thomas)
5. "Tales of Kilimanjaro" (Alan Pasqua, Armando Peraza, Raul Rekow, Carlos Santana)
6. "Black Magic Woman" (Peter Green)
7. "Gypsy Queen" (Gábor Szabó)
8. "Oye Como Va" (Tito Puente)
9. "Incident at Neshabur" (Alberto Gianquinto, Santana)
10. "Waited All My Life"
11. "Aqua Marine" (Pasqua, Santana)
12. "Savor" (Areas, Brown, Carabello, Rolie, Santana, Shrieve)
13. "Jin-go-lo-ba" (Babatunde Olatunji)

==== Australia ====
The band did two shows in Australia on July 23 at Sydney Entertainment Centre in Sydney and July 24 at Melbourne Sports and Entertainment Centre in Melbourne. Sourced from a bootleg recording, the most complete set list is from Melbourne:

1. "Concierto de Aranjuez" (Joaquín Rodrigo)
2. "Soul Sacrifice" (Santana, Rolie, Brown, Marcus Malone)
3. "Batuka" (Areas, Brown, Carabello, Rolie, Shrieve)
4. "No One to Depend On" (Carabello, Escovedo, Rolie, Bobo, Lastie)
5. "Taboo" (Areas, Rolie)
6. "Gypsy Queen" (Szabó)
7. "Savor" (Areas, Brown, Carabello, Rolie, Santana, Shrieve)
8. "Jin-go-lo-ba" (Olatunji)
9. "Havana Moon" (Chuck Berry)
10. "Toussaint L'Overture" (Areas, Brown, Carabello, Rolie, Santana, Shrieve)
11. "Incident at Neshabur" (Gianquinto, Santana)
12. "Open Invitation" (Santana, Lambert, Potter, Greg Walker, David Margen)
13. "She's Not There" (Rod Argent)
14. "Right Now" (Alex Ligertwood, Santana)
15. "Shangó" (Rekow, Orestes Vilató, Peraza)
16. "Super Boogie"
17. "Hong Kong Blues"
18. "John Henry" (traditional)
19. "Shake Your Moneymaker" (Elmore James)
20. "Hold On" (Thomas)
21. "Europa (Earth's Cry Heaven's Smile)" (Tom Coster, Santana)

==== US and Canada ====
A North American tour lasted from July 29 at Neal S. Blaisdell Center Arena in Honolulu, Hawaii to October 21 at the Caesars Tahoe casino in Stateline, Nevada. A typical set list is from October 6 at the Universal Amphitheatre in Los Angeles, California:

1. "Batuka" (Areas, Brown, Carabello, Rolie, Shrieve)
2. "No One to Depend On" (Carabello, Escovedo, Rolie, Bobo, Lastie)
3. "Taboo" (Areas, Rolie)
4. "Hold On" (Thomas)
5. "Tales of Kilimanjaro" (Pasqua, Peraza, Rekow, Santana)
6. "Black Magic Woman" (Green)
7. "Gypsy Queen" (Szabó)
8. "Incident at Neshabur" (Gianquinto, Santana)
9. "Waited All My Life"
10. "Aqua Marine" (Pasqua, Santana)
11. "Brotherhood" (David Sancious, Santana, Chester D. Thompson)
12. "Savor" (Areas, Brown, Carabello, Rolie, Santana, Shrieve)
13. "Jin-go-lo-ba" (Olatunji)
14. "Havana Moon" (Berry)
15. "Soul Sacrifice" (Santana, Rolie, Brown, Malone)
16. "Concierto de Aranjuez" (Rodrigo)
17. "Open Invitation" (Santana, Lambert, Potter, Walker, Margen)
18. "She's Not There" (Argent)
19. "Right Now" (Ligertwood, Santana)
20. "Europa (Earth's Cry Heaven's Smile)" (Coster, Santana)
21. "Shangó" (Rekow, Vilató, Peraza)
22. "In a Silent Way" (Joe Zawinul, Miles Davis)
23. "Dealer" (Jim Capaldi)
24. "Super Boogie"
25. "Hong Kong Blues"
26. "Shake Your Moneymaker" (James)

=== Tour dates ===
The tour itinerary consisted of:

==== Asian leg (July 3–19) ====
List of tour dates with date, city, country, venue
Date (1983)	City	Country	Venue
July 3	Yokohama	Japan	Yokohama Cultural Gymnasium
July 4	Hamamatsu	Japan	Hamamatsu Shimin Kaikan
July 6	Osaka	Japan	Festival Hall
July 7	Osaka	Japan	Festival Hall
July 9	Nagoya	Japan	Nagoya Civic Assembly Hall
July 10	Tokyo	Japan	NHK Hall
July 11	Utsunomiya	Japan	Utsunomiya Bunka Kaikan
July 13	Takasaki	Japan	Gunma Music Center
July 14	Chiba	Japan	Chiba Bunka Kaikan
July 15	Tokyo	Japan	Nakano Sun Plaza Hall
July 16	Tokyo	Japan	Nippon Budokan
July 19	Wan Chai	Hong Kong	Queen Elizabeth Stadium

==== Australian leg (July 23–24) ====
List of tour dates with date, city, country, venue
Date (1983)	City	Country	Venue
July 23	Sydney	Australia	Sydney Entertainment Centre
July 24	Melbourne	Australia	Melbourne Sports and Entertainment Centre

==== North American leg (July 29 – October 21) ====
List of tour dates with date, city, country, venue
Date (1983)	City	Country	Venue
July 29	Honolulu	United States	Neal S. Blaisdell Center Arena
July 30	Lahaina	United States	Royal Lahaina Tennis Stadium
August 26	Philadelphia	United States	Spectrum
August 27	Wantagh	United States	Jones Beach Marine Theater
August 29	New York City	United States	Pier 84
August 30	New York City	United States	Pier 84
August 31	Syracuse	United States	New York State Fair Grandstand
September 1	Vaughan	Canada	Kingswood Music Theatre
September 3	Holmdel Township	United States	Garden State Arts Center
September 4	South Yarmouth	United States	Cape Cod Coliseum
September 5	Saratoga Springs	United States	Saratoga Performing Arts Center
September 7	Columbia	United States	Merriweather Post Pavilion
September 9	Cuyahoga Falls	United States	Blossom Music Center
September 10	Chicago	United States	Poplar Creek Music Theatre
September 11	Mecosta	United States	Northern Star Live Stage
September 15	Clarkston	United States	Pine Knob Music Theatre
September 16	Clarkston	United States	Pine Knob Music Theatre
September 17	Clarkston	United States	Pine Knob Music Theatre
September 30	Fresno	United States	Fresno State Amphitheatre
October 2	Stanford	United States	Laurence Frost Amphitheater
October 5	Los Angeles	United States	Universal Amphitheatre
October 6	Los Angeles	United States	Universal Amphitheatre
October 7	San Diego	United States	SDSU Open Air Theatre
October 8	Costa Mesa	United States	Pacific Amphitheatre
October 9	Sacramento	United States	Cal Expo Amphitheatre
October 10	Los Angeles	United States	Greek Theatre
October 21	Stateline	United States	Caesars Tahoe

=== Box office score data ===
List of box office score data with date, city, venue, attendance, gross, references
Date (1983)	City	Venue	Attendance	Gross	Ref(s)
October 2	Stanford, United States	Laurence Frost Amphitheater	7,968 / 10,000	$100,524	
October 7	San Diego, United States	SDSU Open Air Theatre	4,343 / 4,343	$62,800	
TOTAL			12,311 / 14,343 (86%)	$163,324	

== Bob Dylan/Santana European Tour 1984 (1984) ==
From May 28 to July 8, 1984, Bob Dylan and Santana set out on a twenty-seven date European tour.

== Beyond Appearances Tour (1984–1986) ==
Beyond Appearances Tour
- Tour by Santana
- Associated album: Beyond Appearances
- Start date: October 6, 1984
- End date: November 1, 1986
- Legs: 4
- No. of shows: 107 in North America; 3 in Oceania; 1 in Asia; 111 in total

Santana concert chronology
- Bob Dylan/Santana European Tour 1984 (1984); Beyond Appearances Tour (1984–86); Freedom Tour (1987)

The Beyond Appearances Tour was the twentieth concert tour by American rock band Santana from 1984 to 1986.

=== Live releases ===
Live material from this tour has appeared on the following releases:

- "Super Boogie" and "Hong Kong Blues" on the 1988 compilation album Viva Santana! are from July 14, 1985, at the Agora Ballroom in West Hartford, Connecticut.
- "Open Invitation" and "She's Not There" from the second show on August 9, 1985, at the Warfield Theatre in San Francisco were also featured on Viva Santana!.
- "She's Not There" and "Savor" from the same show at the Warfield were released on the 1988 video Viva Santana! An Intimate Conversation With Carlos Santana.

=== Tour band ===
- Alex Ligertwood – lead vocals, rhythm guitar (through May 1986)
- Buddy Miles – lead vocals (beginning May 1986)
- Carlos Santana – lead guitar, percussion, vocals
- Chester D. Thompson – keyboards
- Sterling Crew – keyboards (from April 1985 to May 1986)
- Tom Coster – keyboards (beginning May 1986)
- Alphonso Johnson – bass guitar
- Greg Walker – lead vocals, percussion (through May 1986)
- Graham Lear – drums
- Raul Rekow – congas, bongos, percussion, backing vocals
- Armando Peraza – congas, percussion
- Orestes Vilató – timbales, percussion

=== Reception ===
The concerts on October 31, 1984, at The Ritz in New York City were given a positive review by Billboard. The band's set at the Crack Down! concert in Madison Square Garden on October 31, 1986, was given a mostly positive review. In a review for The New York Times, Jon Pareles said that the band's new vocalist, Buddy Miles, "did not do much with the songs, but he delivered an impassioned version of his own 'Them Changes'." He also added that the band "worked up a percussive momentum during instrumental sections, particularly the climactic 'Black Magic Woman'".

=== Set list ===
1984
1. "Brotherhood" (David Sancious, Carlos Santana, Chester D. Thompson)
2. "Spirit" (Alphonso Johnson, Alex Ligertwood, Raul Rekow)
3. "Primera Invasion" (Graham Lear, David Margen, Alan Pasqua, Santana)
4. "Open Invitation" (Santana, Dennis Lambert, Brian Potter, Greg Walker, Margen)
5. "Body Surfing" (Santana, Ligertwood)
6. "She's Not There" (Rod Argent)
7. "Incident at Neshabur" (Alberto Gianquinto, Santana)
8. "Waited All My Life"
9. "Breaking Out" (Johnson, Ligertwood)
10. "Super Boogie"
11. "Hong Kong Blues" (Hoagy Carmichael)
12. "Savor" (José Areas, David Brown, Michael Carabello, Gregg Rolie, Santana, Michael Shrieve)
13. "Soul Sacrifice" (Santana, Rolie, Brown, Marcus Malone)
14. "Batuka" (Areas, Brown, Carabello, Rolie, Shrieve)
15. "No One to Depend On" (Carabello, Coke Escovedo, Rolie, Willie Bobo, Melvin Lastie)
16. "Black Magic Woman" (Peter Green)
17. "Gypsy Queen" (Gábor Szabó)
18. "Right Now" (Ligertwood, Santana)
1985
1. "Brotherhood" (Sancious, Santana, Thompson)
2. "Primera Invasion" (Lear, Margen, Pasqua, Santana)
3. "Open Invitation" (Santana, Lambert, Potter, Walker, Margen)
4. "She's Not There" (Argent)
5. "Incident at Neshabur" (Gianquinto, Santana)
6. "Waited All My Life"
7. "Body Surfing" (Santana, Ligertwood)
8. "Breaking Out" (Johnson, Ligertwood)
9. "Super Boogie"
10. "Black Magic Woman" (Green)
11. "Gypsy Queen" (Szabó)
12. "Hong Kong Blues" (Carmichael)
13. "Savor" (Areas, Brown, Carabello, Rolie, Santana, Shrieve)
14. "Say It Again" (Val Garay, Steve Goldstein, Anthony La Peau)
15. "Soul Sacrifice" (Santana, Rolie, Brown, Marcus Malone)
16. "Two Points of View" (Ligertwood, Santana)
17. "Batuka" (Areas, Brown, Carabello, Rolie, Shrieve)
18. "No One to Depend On" (Carabello, Escovedo, Rolie, Bobo, Lastie)
19. "Europa (Earth's Cry Heaven's Smile)" (Tom Coster, Santana)
20. "Right Now" (Ligertwood, Santana)
1986
1. "Brotherhood" (Sancious, Santana, Thompson)
2. "Primera Invasion" (Lear, Margen, Pasqua, Santana)
3. "Open Invitation" (Santana, Lambert, Potter, Walker, Margen)
4. "She's Not There" (Argent)
5. "Incident at Neshabur" (Gianquinto, Santana)
6. "Super Boogie"
7. "Songs of Freedom" (Coster, Buddy Miles, Santana)
8. "Hong Kong Blues" (Carmichael)
9. "Savor" (Areas, Brown, Carabello, Rolie, Santana, Shrieve)
10. "Them Changes" (Miles)
11. "Black Magic Woman" (Green)
12. "Gypsy Queen" (Szabó)
13. "Soul Sacrifice" (Santana, Rolie, Brown, Malone)
14. "Oye Como Va" (Tito Puente)
15. "By the Pool"
16. "Evil Ways" (Clarence "Sonny" Henry)
17. "Once It's Gotcha" (Jeffrey Cohen, Coster, Johnson)
18. "Europa (Earth's Cry Heaven's Smile)" (Coster, Santana)
19. "Jin-go-lo-ba" (Babatunde Olatunji)
20. "Right Now" (Ligertwood, Santana)

=== Tour dates ===
==== North American leg (October 6, 1984 – May 24, 1986) ====
List of tour dates with date, city, country, venue
Date	City	Country	Venue
October 6, 1984	San Diego	United States	SDSU Open Air Theatre
October 7, 1984	Ventura	United States	Seaside Park
October 26, 1984	Rockford	United States	Rockford MetroCentre
October 27, 1984	Ann Arbor	United States	Crisler Arena
October 28, 1984	Evanston	United States	Welsh–Ryan Arena
October 29, 1984	New York City	United States	The Ritz
October 31, 1984 (2 shows)	New York City	United States	The Ritz
November 2, 1984	Burlington	United States	Roy L. Patrick Gymnasium
November 3, 1984	Durham	United States	Lundholm Gym
November 4, 1984	Stony Brook	United States	Stony Brook Gymnasium
November 5, 1984	Albany	United States	Palace Theatre
November 7, 1984	Washington, D.C.	United States	DAR Constitution Hall
November 9, 1984	Sunrise	United States	Sunrise Musical Theater
November 10, 1984	Tampa	United States	USF Sun Dome
November 11, 1984	Atlanta	United States	Fox Theatre
November 24, 1984	Los Angeles	United States	Hollywood Palladium
November 25, 1984	Berkeley	United States	Berkeley Community Theatre
November 28, 1984	San Jose	United States	San Jose Civic Auditorium
November 29, 1984	Stateline	United States	Caesars Tahoe
November 30, 1984	Stateline	United States	Caesars Tahoe
December 1, 1984	Stateline	United States	Caesars Tahoe
April 27, 1985	Buffalo	United States	Shea's Performing Arts Center
April 28, 1985	Ithaca	United States	Barton Hall
April 30, 1985	Amherst	United States	Fine Arts Center
May 1, 1985	Troy	United States	Houston Field House
May 2, 1985	New Brunswick	United States	College Avenue Gymnasium
May 3, 1985	Binghamton	United States	Broome County Veterans Memorial Arena
May 4, 1985	Grand Rapids	United States	Welsh Auditorium
May 5, 1985	Newark	United States	Delaware Field House
May 8, 1985	Poughkeepsie	United States	Mid-Hudson Civic Center
May 9, 1985	Providence	United States	Providence Civic Center
May 10, 1985	New Haven	United States	New Haven Veterans Memorial Coliseum
May 30, 1985	Grand Rapids	United States	Welsh Auditorium
May 31, 1985	Chicago	United States	Poplar Creek Music Theatre
June 1, 1985	Cuyahoga Falls	United States	Blossom Music Center
June 2, 1985	Hampton	United States	Hampton Coliseum
June 4, 1985	Atlanta	United States	Fox Theatre
June 6, 1985	Kansas City	United States	Starlight Theatre
June 7, 1985	St. Louis	United States	St. Louis Municipal Opera Theatre
June 8, 1985	Indianapolis	United States	Indianapolis Tennis Center
June 9, 1985	Pittsburgh	United States	Civic Arena
June 11, 1985	Davenport	United States	Palmer Auditorium
June 12, 1985	Chicago	United States	Bismarck Theatre
June 14, 1985	Clarkston	United States	Pine Knob Music Theatre
June 15, 1985	Clarkston	United States	Pine Knob Music Theatre
June 16, 1985	Cincinnati	United States	J. Ralph Corbett Pavilion
June 27, 1985	Middletown	United States	Orange County Fair Speedway
June 28, 1985	Boston	United States	Boston Common
June 29, 1985	Weedsport	United States	Cayuga County Fair Speedway
July 2, 1985	Philadelphia	United States	Mann Music Center
July 3, 1985	Holmdel Township	United States	Garden State Arts Center
July 5, 1985	Wantagh	United States	Jones Beach Marine Theater
July 6, 1985	Columbia	United States	Merriweather Post Pavilion
July 8, 1985 (Note: The concerts on July 8–9, 1985 were a part of Miller Time Concerts on the Pier.)	New York City	United States	Pier 84
July 9, 1985	New York City	United States	Pier 84
July 10, 1985	Canandaigua	United States	Finger Lakes Performing Arts Center
July 12, 1985	Vaughan	Canada	Kingswood Music Theatre
July 13, 1985 (Note: The concert on July 13, 1985, was a part of Live Aid.)	Philadelphia	United States	John F. Kennedy Stadium
July 14, 1985	West Hartford	United States	Agora Ballroom
July 26, 1985	San Jose	United States	Santa Clara County Fairgrounds
July 27, 1985 (2 shows)	Los Angeles	United States	Wiltern Theatre
July 28, 1985	San Diego	United States	SDSU Open Air Theatre
July 30, 1985	Santa Barbara	United States	Santa Barbara County Fairgrounds
August 2, 1985	Los Angeles	United States	Greek Theatre
August 3, 1985	Costa Mesa	United States	Pacific Amphitheatre
August 4, 1985	Mesa	United States	Mesa Amphitheatre
August 6, 1985	Park City	United States	Park West
August 7, 1985	Morrison	United States	Red Rocks Amphitheatre
August 9, 1985	San Francisco	United States	Warfield Theatre
August 10, 1985	Concord	United States	Concord Pavilion
August 17, 1985	Fresno	United States	Fresno State Amphitheatre
August 22, 1985	Cincinnati	United States	J. Ralph Corbett Pavilion
November 15, 1985	Albany	United States	Palace Theatre
January 18, 1986 (Note: The concert on January 18, 1986 was a part of We Still Have a Dream: From Selma to Soweto.)	Oakland	United States	Kaiser Convention Center
March 15, 1986 (Note: The concert on March 15, 1986 was a part of the Bammies.)	San Francisco	United States	San Francisco Civic Auditorium
May 24, 1986 (Note: The concert on March 15, 1986 was a part of the Music & Tennis Festival.)	Concord	United States	Concord Pavilion

==== Japanese show (June 1, 1986) ====
List of tour dates with date, city, country, venue
Date	City	Country	Venue
June 1, 1986 (Note: The concert on June 1, 1986 was a part of Suntory Beer Sound Market '86.)	Karuizawa	Japan	Karuizawa Prince Hotel

==== Australian leg (June 5–9, 1986) ====
List of tour dates with date, city, country, venue
Date	City	Country	Venue
June 5, 1986	Perth	Australia	Perth Entertainment Centre
June 7, 1986	Perth	Australia	Perth Entertainment Centre
June 9, 1986	Melbourne	Australia	Melbourne Sports and Entertainment Centre

==== North American leg (June 12 – November 1, 1986) ====
List of tour dates with date, city, country, venue
Date	City	Country	Venue
June 12, 1986	Honolulu	United States	Waikiki Shell
July 17, 1986	Oklahoma City	United States	Zoo Amphitheatre
July 18, 1986	Dallas	United States	Park Central Amphitheater
July 19, 1986	Houston	United States	Southern Star Amphitheatre
July 20, 1986	San Antonio	United States	San Antonio Municipal Auditorium
July 22, 1986	St. Louis	United States	Kiel Opera House
July 24, 1986	Cuyahoga Falls	United States	Blossom Music Center
July 25, 1986	Chicago	United States	Poplar Creek Music Theatre
July 26, 1986	Clarkston	United States	Pine Knob Music Theatre
July 28, 1986	Poughkeepsie	United States	Mid-Hudson Civic Center
July 30, 1986	New York City	United States	Pier 84
August 1, 1986	Wantagh	United States	Jones Beach Marine Theater
August 2, 1986	Philadelphia	United States	Mann Music Center
August 3, 1986	Holmdel Township	United States	Garden State Arts Center
August 5, 1986	Darien Center	United States	Darien Lake Performing Arts Center
August 6, 1986	Columbia	United States	Merriweather Post Pavilion
August 8, 1986	Tampa	United States	Tampa Jai-Alai Fronton
August 9, 1986	Sunrise	United States	Sunrise Musical Theater
August 11, 1986	Mansfield	United States	Great Woods Center for the Performing Arts
August 17, 1986 (Note: The concert on August 17, 1986 was a part of the 20th anniversary celebration of the Santana band.)	Mountain View	United States	Shoreline Amphitheatre
September 19, 1986 (2 shows)	Stateline	United States	Caesers Tahoe
September 20, 1986 (2 shows)	Stateline	United States	Caesers Tahoe
September 25, 1986	Miami Beach	United States	Doral Beach Hotel
September 26, 1986	Sunrise	United States	Sunrise Musical Theater
September 27, 1986	Miami	United States	Bayfront Park Amphitheater
October 1, 1986	Mesa	United States	Mesa Amphitheatre
October 2, 1986	Los Angeles	United States	Wiltern Theatre
October 3, 1986	Los Angeles	United States	Wiltern Theatre
October 4, 1986	Santa Barbara	United States	Santa Barbara Bowl
October 31, 1986 (Note: The concerts on October 31–November 1, 1986 were a part of Crack Down!)	New York City	United States	Madison Square Garden
November 1, 1986	New York City	United States	Felt Forum

=== Box office score data ===
List of box office score data with date, city, venue, attendance, gross, references
Date	City	Venue	Attendance	Gross	Ref(s)
May 8, 1985	Poughkeepsie, United States	Mid-Hudson Civic Center	3,037 / 3,037	$40,100	
May 9, 1985	Providence, United States	Providence Civic Center	3,864 / 7,117	$44,182	
June 4, 1985	Atlanta, United States	Fox Theatre	2,635 / 3,985	$36,231	
June 6, 1985 (2 shows)	Kansas City, United States	Starlight Theatre	3,963 / 7,800	$48,505	
June 7, 1985	St. Louis, United States	St. Louis Municipal Opera Theatre	8,812 / 10,235	$131,880	
June 27, 1985	Middletown, United States	Orange County Fair Speedway	5,576 / 6,000	$60,830	
June 29, 1985	Weedsport, United States	Cayuga County Fair Speedway	4,684 / 6,000	$48,946	
July 13, 1985	Philadelphia, United States	John F. Kennedy Stadium	89,484 / 89,484	$3,552,800	
August 10, 1985	Concord, United States	Concord Pavilion	8,372 / 8,372	$123,129	
August 17, 1986	Mountain View, United States	Shoreline Amphitheatre	10,088 / 15,000	$159,836	
October 2, 1986	Los Angeles, United States	Wiltern Theatre	6,900 / 6,900	$120,750	
October 3, 1986	Los Angeles, United States	Wiltern Theatre	6,900 / 6,900	$120,750	
TOTAL			147,415 / 163,930 (90%)	$4,367,189	

== Freedom Tour (1987) ==
Freedom Tour
- Tour by Santana
- Associated album: Freedom
- Start date: February 14, 1987
- End date: September 12, 1987
- Legs: 7
- No. of shows: 55 in North America; 45 in Europe; 2 in Asia; 102 in total

Santana concert chronology
- Beyond Appearances Tour (1984–86); Freedom Tour (1987); Blues for Salvador Tour (1988)

The Freedom Tour (also known as The Freedom Concert '87 or The Freedom Concert 1987) was the twenty-first concert tour by Santana, supporting their album Freedom.

=== History ===
In 1987, Santana did a long world tour promoting Freedom, their tenth international tour since 1970. Aside from visiting countries they have never visited before, such as East Berlin, the band did two shows in war-torn Israel on April 29 and 30. The concert at the Sultan's Pool in Jerusalem on the 29th attracted at least 10,000 Jewish and Arab fans. Lead guitarist Carlos Santana's highlight of the tour was on July 4 at the Izmailovo Stadium in Moscow, Russia, where the band, alongside James Taylor, the Doobie Brothers, Bonnie Raitt and more, played to more than 25,000 Russians, the band's first show in Russia.

On the night of September 11, 1987, at the Sunrise Musical Theater in Sunrise, Florida, bass player Jaco Pastorius sneaked onstage before being kicked out by the theater's security team. He then made his way to the Midnight Bottle Club in Wilton Manors, Florida, where he ended up in a fight with Luc Havan, the club's manager, after reportedly kicking in a glass door, having been refused entry to the club. As a result of his injuries, he died on September 21, 1987, at the age of 35 at Broward General Medical Center in Fort Lauderdale.

=== Live releases ===
Live material from 1987 has appeared on the following releases:

- Crowd shots from the concert on July 4 at the Izmailovo Stadium in Moscow were used for the 1988 video Viva Santana! An Intimate Conversation With Carlos Santana.

=== Tour band ===
- Alex Ligertwood – lead vocals, rhythm guitar
- Buddy Miles – lead vocals (through July)
- Carlos Santana – lead guitar, percussion, vocals
- Chester D. Thompson – keyboards
- Alphonso Johnson – bass guitar
- Graham Lear – drums
- Raul Rekow – congas, bongos, percussion, backing vocals
- Armando Peraza – congas, percussion
- Orestes Vilató – timbales, percussion

=== Set list ===
A typical set list of this tour was as follows (a song not followed by the writer indicates that the writer of the song is unknown):

1. "The Beat of My Drum" (Babatunde Olatunji)
2. "Veracruz" (Jeffrey Cohen, Buddy Miles, Gregg Rolie, Carlos Santana)
3. "Primera Invasion" (Graham Lear, David Margen, Alan Pasqua, Santana)
4. "Open Invitation" (Santana, Dennis Lambert, Brian Potter, Greg Walker, Margen)
5. "She's Not There" (Rod Argent)
6. "One"
7. "Incident at Neshabur" (Alberto Gianquinto, Santana)
8. "Body Surfing" (Santana, Alex Ligertwood)
9. "Songs of Freedom" (Tom Coster, Miles, Santana)
10. "Savor" (José Areas, David Brown, Michael Carabello, Rolie, Santana, Michael Shrieve)
11. "Cavatina" (Stanley Myers)
12. "Black Magic Woman" (Peter Green)
13. "Gypsy Queen" (Gábor Szabó)
14. "Oye Como Va" (Tito Puente)
15. "Evil Ways" (Clarence "Sonny" Henry)
16. "Jin-go-lo-ba" (Babatunde Olatunji)
17. "Once It's Gotcha" (Cohen, Coster, Alphonso Johnson)

Encore

18. "The Healer" (John Lee Hooker, Roy Rogers, Santana, Chester Thompson)
19. "By the Pool"
20. "Europa (Earth's Cry Heaven's Smile)" (Coster, Santana)
21. "Right Now" (Ligertwood, Santana)

Second Encore

22. "Soul Sacrifice" (Santana, Rolie, Brown, Marcus Malone)
23. "Deeper, Dig Deeper" (Sterling Crew, Miles, Santana, Thompson)

=== Tour dates ===
The tour itinerary consisted of:

==== North American show (February 14) ====
List of tour dates with date, city, country, venue
Date (1987)	City	Country	Venue
February 14	Oakland	United States	Omni Club

==== European leg (March 5 – April 26) ====
List of tour dates with date, city, country, venue
Date (1987)	City	Country	Venue
March 5	Helsinki	Finland	Helsinki Ice Hall
March 7	Stockholm	Sweden	Johanneshovs Isstadion
March 9	Lillestrøm	Norway	Skedsmohallen
March 10	Copenhagen	Denmark	Valby Idrætspark
March 12	West Berlin	West Germany	Deutschlandhalle
March 13	Kassel	West Germany	Eissporthalle Kassel
March 14	Würzburg	West Germany	Carl-Diem-Halle
March 16	Vienna	Austria	Wiener Stadthalle
March 17	Stuttgart	West Germany	Hanns-Martin-Schleyer-Halle
March 19	Frankfurt	West Germany	Festhalle Messe Frankfurt
March 20	Zürich	Switzerland	Hallenstadion
March 21	Bremen	West Germany	Stadthalle Bremen
March 22	Hamburg	West Germany	Alsterdorfer Sporthalle
March 24	Eppelheim	West Germany	Rhein-Neckar-Halle
March 25	Essen	West Germany	Grugahalle
March 26	Hanover	West Germany	Eilenriedehalle
March 28	Paris	France	Palais Omnisports de Paris-Bercy
March 29	Lyon	France	Palais des Sports de Gerland
March 31	Munich	West Germany	Olympiahalle München
April 1	Saarbrücken	West Germany	Saarlandhalle
April 2	Cologne	West Germany	Sporthalle
April 3	Kiel	West Germany	Ostseehalle
April 5	East Berlin	East Germany	Palace of the Republic
April 6	East Berlin	East Germany	Palace of the Republic
April 24	Milan	Italy	Palatrussardi
April 25	Rome	Italy	Teatro Tenda Pianeta
April 26	Rome	Italy	Teatro Tenda Pianeta

==== Israeli leg (April 29–30) ====
List of tour dates with date, city, country, venue
Date (1987)	City	Country	Venue
April 29	Jerusalem	Israel	Sultan's Pool
April 30	Tel Aviv	Israel	Yarkon Park

==== European leg (May 2–24) ====
List of tour dates with date, city, country, venue
Date (1987)	City	Country	Venue
May 2	Clermont-Ferrand	France	Clermont-Ferrand Sports Hall
May 3	Perpignan	France	Parc des Expositions de Perpignan
May 4	Bordeaux	France	Patinoire de Mériadeck
May 6	Toulouse	France	Palais des Sports
May 7	Montpellier	France	Le Zénith Sud
May 8	Angers	France	Parc des Expositions d'Angers
May 10	Guilers	France	Parc des Expositions de Penfeld
May 12	Lausanne	Switzerland	Centre Intercommunal de Glace de Malley
May 13	Brussels	Belgium	Forest National
May 14	Rotterdam	Netherlands	Sportpaleis
May 16	London	England	Hammersmith Odeon
May 17	London	England	Hammersmith Odeon
May 19	Biedermannsdorf	Austria	Jubiläumshalle
May 20	Graz	Austria	Eisstadion Graz Liebenau
May 21	Budapest	Hungary	Hidegkuti Nándor Stadion
May 23 (Note: The concert on May 23 was a part of Rock am See.)	Konstanz	West Germany	Bodenseestadion
May 24 (Note: The concert on May 24 was a part of Open Air Festival Loreley.)	Sankt Goarshausen	West Germany	Freilichtbühne Loreley

==== U.S. leg (June 13 – July 1) ====
List of tour dates with date, city, country, venue
Date (1987)	City	Country	Venue
June 13 (Note: The concert on June 13 was a part of the Twilight Dance Concert.)	Berkeley	United States	William Randolph Hearst Greek Theatre
June 14 (Note: The concert on June 14 was a part of the Carnaval San Francisco.)	San Francisco	United States	Harrison Street
June 19 (2 shows)	Stateline	United States	Caesars Tahoe
June 20 (2 shows)	Stateline	United States	Caesars Tahoe
June 26	Clarkston	United States	Pine Knob Music Theatre
June 27	Chicago	United States	Poplar Creek Music Theatre
June 28	Indianapolis	United States	Indianapolis Tennis Center
June 30	Saratoga Springs	United States	Saratoga Performing Arts Center
July 1	Canandaigua	United States	Finger Lakes Performing Arts Center

==== Russian show (July 4) ====
List of tour dates with date, city, country, venue
Date (1987)	City	Country	Venue
July 4 (Note: The concert on July 4 was a part of the Soviet/American Peace Concert.)	Moscow	Russia	Izmailovo Stadium

==== North American leg (July 8 – September 12) ====
List of tour dates with date, city, country, venue
Date (1987)	City	Country	Venue
July 8	Norfolk	United States	Chrysler Hall
July 10	Columbia	United States	Merriweather Post Pavilion
July 11	Cleveland	United States	Nautica Stage
July 13	Mansfield	United States	Xfinity Center
July 14	Upper Darby Township	United States	Tower Theater
July 16	Holmdel Township	United States	Garden State Arts Center
July 17	New York City	United States	Pier 84
July 18	Wantagh	United States	Jones Beach Marine Theater
July 19	Syracuse	United States	Long Branch Park
July 21 (2 shows)	New Haven	United States	Toad's Place
July 23	Canandaigua	United States	Finger Lakes Performing Arts Center
July 24	Vaughan	Canada	Kingswood Music Theatre
July 25	Montreal	Canada	Salle Wilfrid-Pelletier
June 26	Hampton Beach	United States	Hampton Beach Casino Ballroom
August 14	San Diego	United States	San Diego State University
August 15	Los Angeles	United States	Universal Amphitheatre
August 16	Los Angeles	United States	Universal Amphitheatre
August 19	Ventura	United States	Seaside Park
August 20	Irvine	United States	Irvine Meadows Amphitheatre
August 22 (Note: The concerts on August 22–23 were a part of Mountain Aire II.)	Angels Camp	United States	Calaveras County Fairgrounds
August 23	Angels Camp	United States	Calaveras County Fairgrounds
August 26	Denver	United States	McNichols Sports Arena
August 27	Santa Fe	United States	Paolo Soleri Amphitheater
August 28	Santa Fe	United States	Paolo Soleri Amphitheater
August 29	El Paso	United States	Special Events Center
September 1	Austin	United States	Lester E. Palmer Auditorium
September 4	San Antonio	United States	Sunken Garden Theater
September 5	Dallas	United States	State Fair Band Shell
September 6	Houston	United States	Buffalo Bayou Park
September 10	Tampa	United States	Expo Hall
September 11	Sunrise	United States	Sunrise Musical Theater
September 12	Sunrise	United States	Sunrise Musical Theater

=== Box office score data ===
List of box office score data with date, city, venue, attendance, gross, references
Date (1987)	City	Venue	Attendance	Gross	Ref(s)
June 13	Berkeley, United States	William Randolph Hearst Greek Theatre	8,500 / 8,500	$150,873	
July 11	Cleveland, United States	Nautica Stage	4,110 / 4,110	$59,150	
July 16	Holmdel Township, United States	Garden State Arts Center	6,513 / 10,802	$97,847	
July 18	Wantagh, United States	Jones Beach Marine Theater	9,996 / 10,000	$184,926	
August 20	Irvine, United States	Irvine Meadows Amphitheatre	5,487 / 6,133	$72,958	
August 22	Angels Camp, United States	Calaveras County Fairgrounds	40,000 / 40,000	$840,000	
August 23	Angels Camp, United States	Calaveras County Fairgrounds	40,000 / 40,000	$840,000	
August 27	Santa Fe, United States	Paolo Soleri Amphitheater	4,587 / 4,587	$80,797	
August 28	Santa Fe, United States	Paolo Soleri Amphitheater	4,587 / 4,587	$80,797	
TOTAL			79,193 / 84,132 (94%)	$1,486,551	

== Blues for Salvador Tour (1988) ==
Blues for Salvador Tour
- Tour by Santana
- Associated album: Blues for Salvador
- Start date: April 29, 1988
- End date: May 17, 1988
- Legs: 1
- No. of shows: 16

Santana concert chronology
- Freedom Tour (1987); Blues for Salvador Tour (1988); Viva Santana! Tour (1988–89)

The Blues for Salvador Tour was the twenty-second concert tour by Santana in 1988, supporting leader Carlos Santana's 1987 solo album Blues for Salvador.

=== Tour band ===
Known as "the Promise Band", the tour band was:

- Carlos Santana – guitar, percussion, vocals
- Chester D. Thompson – keyboards, vocals
- Alphonso Johnson – bass guitar
- Leon "Ndugu" Chancler – drums
- José Areas – timbales, congas, percussion
- Armando Peraza – percussion, vocals

=== Set list ===
The tour lasted from April 29, 1988, at the Orpheum in Vancouver, Canada to May 17, 1988, at the Celebrity Theatre in Phoenix, Arizona. An average set list of this tour was as follows:

1. "Bailando/Aquatic Park" (Carlos Santana, Chester D. Thompson, Orestes Vilató)
2. "Bella" (Sterling Crew, Santana, Thompson)
3. "Smooth Criminal" (Michael Jackson)
4. "The Healer" (John Lee Hooker, Roy Rogers, Santana, Chester Thompson)
5. "Wayne I" (Wayne Shorter)
6. "Super Boogie"
7. "Hong Kong Blues" (Hoagy Carmichael)
8. "Wonderful Combination"
9. "Savor" (José Areas, David Brown, Michael Carabello, Gregg Rolie, Santana, Michael Shrieve)
10. "Goodness and Mercy" (Santana, Thompson)
11. "'Trane" (Santana)
12. "Cavatina" (Stanley Myers)
13. "Cloud Nine" (Norman Whitfield, Barrett Strong)
14. "Blues for Salvador" (Santana, Thompson)

Encore

15. "Mandela" (Armando Peraza)
16. "Tryin' Again" (Leon "Ndugu" Chancler)
17. "Hannibal" (Alex Ligertwood, Alan Pasqua, Raul Rekow)
18. "Europa (Earth's Cry Heaven's Smile)" (Tom Coster, Santana)
19. "Deeper, Dig Deeper" (Crew, Buddy Miles, Santana, Thompson)

=== Tour dates ===
List of tour dates with date, city, country, venue
Date (1988)	City	Country	Venue
April 29	Vancouver	Canada	Orpheum
April 30	Seattle	United States	Paramount Theatre
May 1	Spokane	United States	Spokane Opera House
May 2	Portland	United States	Portland Civic Auditorium
May 4	Eugene	United States	Silva Concert Hall
May 5	Redding	United States	Redding Civic Auditorium
May 6	Sacramento	United States	Community Center Theater
May 7 (Note: The concert on May 7 was a part of the Cinco de Mayo Concert.)	Berkeley	United States	William Randolph Hearst Greek Theatre
May 8	Santa Cruz	United States	Santa Cruz Civic Auditorium
May 10	Salinas	United States	Sherwood Hall
May 11	San Francisco	United States	The Fillmore
May 13	San Diego	United States	Open Air Theatre
May 14	Los Angeles	United States	Wiltern Theatre
May 15	Santa Barbara	United States	Santa Barbara Bowl
May 16	Anaheim	United States	Celebrity Theatre
May 17	Phoenix	United States	Celebrity Theatre

=== Box office score data ===
List of box office score data with date, city, venue, attendance, gross, references
Date (1988)	City	Venue	Attendance	Gross	Ref(s)
April 30	Seattle, United States	Paramount Theatre	2,870 / 2,870	$53,095	
May 4	Eugene, United States	Silva Concert Hall	2,449 / 2,449	$44,857	
May 13	San Diego, United States	Open Air Theatre	4,377 / 4,377	$76,014	
May 17	Phoenix, United States	Celebrity Theatre	2,545 / 2,701	$45,122	
TOTAL			12,241 / 12,397 (99%)	$219,088	

== Viva Santana! Tour (1988–1989) ==
Viva Santana! Tour
- Tour by Santana
- Associated album: Viva Santana!
- Start date: August 26, 1988
- End date: November 26, 1989
- Legs: 3
- No. of shows: 62 in North America; 47 in Europe; 109 in total

Santana concert chronology
- Blues for Salvador Tour (1988); Viva Santana! Tour (1988–89); Spirits Dancing in the Flesh Tour (1990)

The Viva Santana! Tour was the twenty-third concert tour by American rock band Santana, supporting the Viva Santana! compilation album. Most of this tour was a reunion tour of sorts, as organist and lead vocalist Gregg Rolie, percussionist José Areas, and drummer Michael Shrieve accompanied the group for some performances.

=== Live releases ===
Live material from this tour has appeared on the following releases:

- "Blues for Salvador" from the show on September 17, 1988, at Blossom Music Center in Cuyahoga Falls, Ohio, was featured on the 1988 video Viva Santana! An Intimate Conversation With Carlos Santana.

=== Tour band ===
- Gregg Rolie – lead vocals, organ, keyboards (through April 1989)
- Alex Ligertwood – lead vocals, rhythm guitar (beginning April 1989)
- Carlos Santana – lead guitar, percussion, vocals
- Chester D. Thompson – keyboards, vocals
- Alphonso Johnson – bass guitar (through September 1989)
- Keith Jones – bass guitar (beginning September 1989)
- Michael Shrieve – drums (through April 1989)
- Walfredo Reyes Jr. – drums (beginning April 1989)
- José Areas – timbales, congas, percussion (through September 1989)
- Armando Peraza – congas, percussion, vocals

=== Set list ===
A typical set list of this tour was as follows:

1. "Mandela" (Armando Peraza)
2. "Batuka" (José Areas, David Brown, Michael Carabello, Gregg Rolie, Michael Shrieve)
3. "No One to Depend On" (Carabello, Coke Escovedo, Rolie, Willie Bobo, Melvin Lastie)
4. "For Those Who Chant" (Luis Gasca)
5. "The Healer" (John Lee Hooker, Roy Rogers, Carlos Santana, Chester Thompson)
6. "Smooth Criminal" (Michael Jackson)
7. "Taboo" (Areas, Rolie)
8. "Black Magic Woman" (Peter Green)
9. "Gypsy Queen" (Gábor Szabó)
10. "Oye Como Va" (Tito Puente)
11. "Se Acabó" (Areas)
12. "Incident at Neshabur" (Alberto Gianquinto, Santana)
13. "Savor" (Areas, Brown, Carabello, Rolie, Santana, Shrieve)
14. "Goodness and Mercy" (Santana, Thompson)
15. "Europa (Earth's Cry Heaven's Smile)" (Tom Coster, Santana)
16. "Everybody's Everything" (Santana, Milton Brown, Tyrone Moss)
17. "Cavatina" (Stanley Myers)
18. "Toussaint L'Overture" (Areas, Brown, Carabello, Rolie, Shrieve, Santana)
19. "Once It's Gotcha" (Jeffrey Cohen, Coster, Alphonso Johnson)

Encore

20. "Soul Sacrifice" (Santana, Rolie, Brown, Marcus Malone)

Second Encore

21. "Deeper, Dig Deeper" (Sterling Crew, Buddy Miles, Santana, Thompson)

=== Tour dates ===
The tour dates were as follows:

==== North American leg (August 26, 1988 – April 29, 1989) ====
List of tour dates with date, city, country, venue
Date	City	Country	Venue
August 26, 1988	Tacoma	United States	Tacoma Dome
August 28, 1988	Eureka	United States	Six Flags St. Louis
August 31, 1988	Atlanta	United States	Chastain Park Amphitheater
September 2, 1988	Richmond	United States	The Mosque
September 3, 1988	Columbia	United States	Merriweather Post Pavilion
September 4, 1988	Wantagh	United States	Jones Beach Marine Theater
September 5, 1988	Bristol	United States	Lake Compounce
September 8, 1988	Mansfield	United States	Great Woods Center for the Performing Arts
September 9, 1988	New York City	United States	Pier 84
September 10, 1988	Holmdel Township	United States	Garden State Arts Center
September 11, 1988	Wantagh	United States	Jones Beach Marine Theater
September 12, 1988	Poughkeepsie	United States	Mid-Hudson Civic Center
September 13, 1988	Wilkes-Barre	United States	Comerford Theater
September 14, 1988	New York City	United States	Pier 84
September 16, 1988	Clarkston	United States	Pine Knob Music Theatre
September 17, 1988	Cuyahoga Falls	United States	Blossom Music Center
September 18, 1988	Chicago	United States	Poplar Creek Music Theatre
September 27, 1988	Los Angeles	United States	Greek Theatre
September 28, 1988	Los Angeles	United States	Greek Theatre
September 30, 1988	Santa Barbara	United States	Santa Barbara Bowl
October 1, 1988	San Diego	United States	Open Air Theatre
October 2, 1988	Costa Mesa	United States	Pacific Amphitheatre
October 4, 1988 (2 shows)	Fresno	United States	Fresno Fairgrounds
October 6, 1988	Las Vegas	United States	Aladdin Theatre for the Performing Arts
October 7, 1988	Mesa	United States	Mesa Amphitheatre
October 8, 1988	Santa Fe	United States	Paolo Soleri Amphitheater
October 9, 1988	El Paso	United States	Special Events Center
October 12, 1988	Houston	United States	Houston Music Hall
October 13, 1988	Corpus Christi	United States	Bayfront Plaza
October 14, 1988	Austin	United States	Lester E. Palmer Auditorium
October 15, 1988	San Antonio	United States	Sunken Garden Theater
October 16, 1988	Dallas	United States	Coca-Cola Starplex Amphitheatre
November 5, 1988	León	Mexico	Estadio León
November 23, 1988	St. Petersburg	United States	Mahaffey Theater
November 25, 1988	Sunrise	United States	Sunrise Musical Theater
November 26, 1988 (2 shows)	Sunrise	United States	Sunrise Musical Theater
November 27, 1988	Kissimmee	United States	Tupperware Convention Center
December 10, 1988 (2 shows)	San Quentin	United States	San Quentin State Prison
January 20, 1989	Miami	United States	James L. Knight Center Theater
April 14, 1989 (2 shows)	San Rafael	United States	Marin Veterans Memorial Auditorium
April 28, 1989 (2 shows) (Note: The concerts on April 28–29, 1989 was a part of the New Orleans Jazz & Heritage Festival.)	New Orleans	United States	Fair Grounds Race Course
April 29, 1989	New Orleans	United States	Fair Grounds Race Course

==== European leg (May 3 – July 27, 1989) ====
List of tour dates with date, city, country, venue
Date	City	Country	Venue
May 3, 1989	Braunschweig	West Germany	Stadthalle Braunschweig
May 4, 1989	Grefrath	West Germany	Eissporthalle
May 5, 1989	Kassel	West Germany	Stadthalle Kassel
May 6, 1989	Würzburg	West Germany	Carl-Diem-Halle
May 8, 1989	Budapest	Hungary	Budapest Sportcsarnok
May 9, 1989	Vienna	Austria	Wiener Stadthalle
May 11, 1989	West Berlin	West Germany	Deutschlandhalle
May 12, 1989	Kiel	West Germany	Ostseehalle
May 13, 1989	Frankfurt	West Germany	Alte Oper
May 15, 1989	Lausanne	Switzerland	Centre Intercommunal de Glace de Malley
May 16, 1989	Zürich	Switzerland	Hallenstadion
May 17, 1989	Locarno	Switzerland	Fevi Associazione
May 19, 1989	Cologne	West Germany	Sporthalle
May 20, 1989	Hamburg	West Germany	Freilichtbühne
May 22, 1989	Essen	West Germany	Grugahalle
May 23, 1989	Stuttgart	West Germany	Hanns-Martin-Schleyer-Halle
May 24, 1989	Siegen	West Germany	Siegerlandhalle
May 26, 1989	Hanover	West Germany	Music Hall
May 27, 1989	Bremen	West Germany	Stadthalle Bremen
May 28, 1989 (2 shows)	The Hague	Netherlands	Statenhal
May 30, 1989	Kockelscheuer	Luxembourg	Patinoire de Kockelscheuer
May 31, 1989	Brussels	Belgium	Forest National
June 2, 1989	Paris	France	Zénith de Paris
June 24, 1989	Bournemouth	England	Bournemouth International Centre
June 25, 1989	London	England	Hammersmith Odeon
June 26, 1989	London	England	Hammersmith Odeon
June 27, 1989	London	England	Hammersmith Odeon
June 29, 1989	Solihull	England	NEC Arena
July 1, 1989 (Note: The concert on July 1, 1989, was a part of the Midtfyns Festival.)	Ringe	Denmark	Dyrskuepladsen
July 3, 1989	Stockholm	Sweden	Gröna Lund
July 4, 1989	Oslo	Norway	Rockefeller Music Hall
July 5, 1989	Stavanger	Norway	Kongeparken
July 8, 1989 (Note: The concert on July 8, 1989, was a part of Ruisrock.)	Turku	Finland	Ruissalo
July 9, 1989	Tübingen	West Germany	Marktplatz
July 12, 1989	Livorno	Italy	N/A
July 13, 1989	Rome	Italy	Palazzo della Civiltà Italiana
July 14, 1989	Lamezia Terme	Italy	Stadio Guido D'Ippolito
July 16, 1989	Modena	Italy	Stadio Alberto Braglia
July 17, 1989	Turin	Italy	Parco della Pellerina
July 18, 1989	Milan	Italy	Palatrussardi
July 19, 1989	Pistoia	Italy	Piazza del Duomo
July 21, 1989	Sanremo	Italy	Teatro Ariston
July 22, 1989	Fréjus	France	Arènes de Fréjus
July 23, 1989	Nîmes	France	Arena of Nîmes
July 24, 1989	Dax	France	Arènes de Dax
July 27, 1989 (Note: The concert on July 27, 1989, was a part of the Paléo Festival de Nyon.)	Nyon	Switzerland	La Prairie de Colovray

==== U.S. leg (September 1 – November 26, 1989) ====
List of tour dates with date, city, country, venue
Date	City	Country	Venue
September 1, 1989	Las Vegas	United States	Aladdin Theatre for the Performing Arts
September 2, 1989	San Diego	United States	Open Air Theatre
September 3, 1989	Costa Mesa	United States	Pacific Amphitheatre
September 4, 1989	Santa Barbara	United States	Santa Barbara Bowl
September 7, 1989	Saratoga	United States	Mountain Winery
September 8, 1989	Saratoga	United States	Mountain Winery
September 9, 1989	Saratoga	United States	Mountain Winery
September 10, 1989	Saratoga	United States	Mountain Winery
September 13, 1989	Los Angeles	United States	Greek Theatre
September 14, 1989	Los Angeles	United States	Greek Theatre
September 15, 1989	Stateline	United States	Caesars Tahoe
September 16, 1989 (2 shows)	Stateline	United States	Caesars Tahoe
September 20, 1989	Bakersfield	United States	Kern County Fairgrounds
November 26, 1989 (Note: The concert on November 26, 1989 was a part of the Earthquake Relief Benefit Concert.)	Watsonville	United States	Watsonville High School

=== Box office score data ===
List of box office score data with date, city, venue, attendance, gross, references
Date	City	Venue	Attendance	Gross	Ref(s)
September 11, 1988	Wantagh, United States	Jones Beach Marine Theater	8,718 / 10,000	$161,283	
