= Blues for Salvador =

Studio album by Carlos Santana
- Released: October 1987
- Studio: Sound City Studios (Van Nuys, California)
- Genre: Instrumental rock
- Length: 45:09
- Label: CBS
- Producer: Carlos Santana

Carlos Santana chronology
Freedom (1987)	Blues for Salvador (1987)	Viva Santana! (1988)

Professional ratings
Review scores
Source	Rating
Allmusic	4.5/5 stars
New Musical Express	6/10

Blues for Salvador is a 1987 album by Carlos Santana, dedicated to his son Salvador. The record was released by Carlos Santana as a solo project, not with the Santana band. It won the 1989 Grammy Award for Best Rock Instrumental Performance, his first Grammy ever.

== Track listing ==
1. "Bailando/Aquatic Park" (Carlos Santana, Chester D. Thompson, Orestes Vilató) – 5:46
2. "Bella" (Sterling Crew, Santana, Thompson) – 4:31
3. "I'm Gone" (Crew, Santana, Thompson) – 3:08
4. "'Trane" (Santana) – 3:11
5. "Deeper, Dig Deeper" (Crew, Buddy Miles, Santana, Thompson) – 6:09
6. "Mingus" (Crew, Santana, Thompson) – 1:26
7. "Now That You Know" (live) (Santana) – 10:29
8. "Hannibal" (Alex Ligertwood, Alan Pasqua, Raul Rekow) – 4:28
9. "Blues for Salvador" (Santana, Thompson) – 5:57

== Personnel ==
- Greg Walker – vocals
- Alex Ligertwood – percussion, vocals
- Carlos Santana – guitar
- Chris Solberg – guitar, vocals
- Chester D. Thompson – keyboards
- Sterling Crew – keyboards, synthesizer
- Orestes Vilató – flute, percussion, timbales, backing vocals
- Alphonso Johnson – bass
- Graham Lear – percussion, drums
- Tony Williams – drums
- Buddy Miles – backing vocals
- Armando Peraza – percussion, bongos, vocals
- Raul Rekow – percussion, conga, vocals, backing vocals

== Charts ==
Chart (1987)	Peak position
Australian Albums (Kent Music Report)	95
US Billboard 200	195
