= Bob Dylan/Santana European Tour 1984 =

1984 concert tour by Bob Dylan and Santana

1984 European Tour
- Tour by Bob Dylan and Santana
- Poster to the concert in Brussels, Belgium
- Location: Europe
- Start date: May 28, 1984
- End date: July 8, 1984
- Legs: 1
- No. of shows: 27
Bob Dylan concert chronology
World Tour 1981 (1981)	European Tour 1984 (1984)	True Confessions Tour (1986)
Santana concert chronology
Havana Moon Tour (1983)	European Tour 1984 (1984)	Beyond Appearances Tour (1984–86)

In the late spring of 1984, Bob Dylan and Santana set out on a twenty-seven date European tour.

== Background ==
Dylan and Carlos Santana played some of the biggest and best known European music venues including the Stade de Schaerbeek in Brussels, Belgium, Ullevi stadium in Gothenburg, Sweden, St James' Park in Newcastle upon Tyne, England, Wembley Stadium in London, England, Slane Castle in Slane, Ireland.

Dylan's band included ex-Rolling Stone Mick Taylor on guitar, ex-Faces' keyboard player Ian McLagan, drummer Colin Allen and bassist Greg Sutton. Dylan and Santana were joined by several major musicians on the tour including Joan Baez (Hamburg, Munich, Copenhagen, Offenbach, Nice and Nantes), Hugues Aufray (Paris and Grenoble), Pino Daniele (Milan 24 June 1984), Van Morrison (Paris, London and Slane), Eric Clapton (London), Chrissie Hynde (London), Bono (Slane), Leslie Dowdall (Slane) and Steve Wickham (Slane).

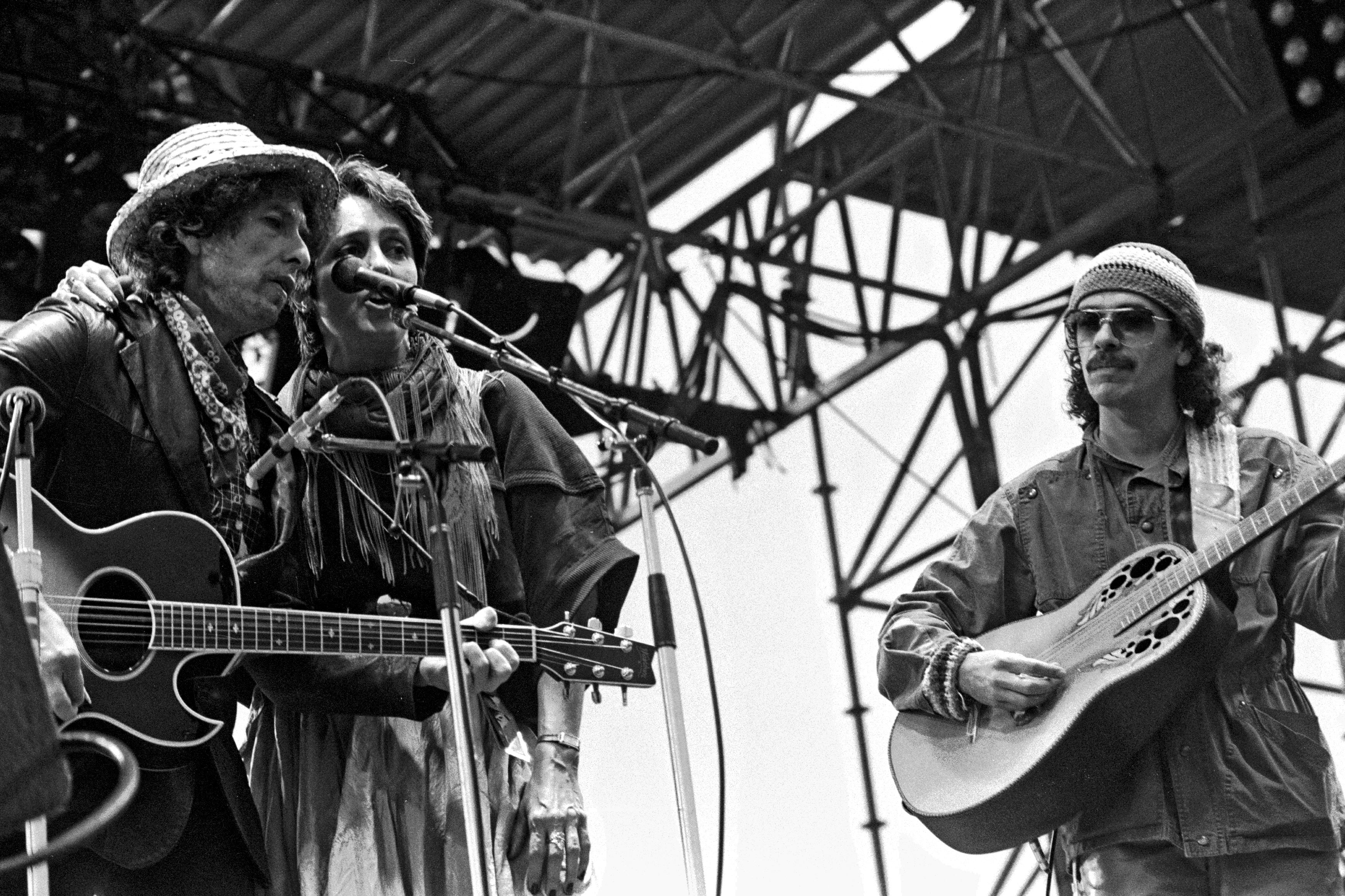
L to R: Dylan, Joan Baez, and Carlos Santana at Wilhelm-Koch-Stadion in Hamburg, Germany on May 31, 1984

Real Live was released in the winter 1984 which documented Dylan's 1984 summer, released by Columbia Records. Six songs from the album were recorded at Wembley Stadium on July 7, two songs were recorded at St. James Park on July 5 and another two were recorded at Slane Castle, Ireland on July 8.

== Tour dates ==
Date	City	Country	Venue
Europe
May 28, 1984	Verona	Italy	Verona Arena
May 29, 1984	Verona	Italy	Verona Arena
May 31, 1984	Hamburg	West Germany	Wilhelm-Koch-Stadion
June 2. 1984	Basel	Switzerland	St. Jakob Stadium
June 3, 1984	Munich	West Germany	Olympiastadion
June 4, 1984	Rotterdam	Netherlands	Sportpaleis Ahoy
June 6, 1984	Rotterdam	Netherlands	Sportpaleis Ahoy
June 7, 1984	Brussels	Belgium	Stade de Schaerbeek
June 9, 1984	Gothenburg	Sweden	Ullevi
June 10, 1984	Copenhagen	Denmark	Københavns Idrætspark
June 11, 1984	Offenbach am Main	West Germany	Stadion am Bieberer Berg
June 13, 1984	West Berlin	West Germany	Waldbühne
June 14, 1984	Vienna	Austria	Wiener Stadthalle
June 16, 1984	Cologne	West Germany	Müngersdorfer Stadion
June 17, 1984	Nice	France	Stade de l'Ouest
June 19, 1984	Rome	Italy	Palazzo dello Sport
June 20, 1984	Rome	Italy	Palazzo dello Sport
June 21, 1984	Rome	Italy	Palazzo dello Sport
June 24, 1984	Milan	Italy	Giuseppe Meazza Stadium
June 26, 1984	Madrid	Spain	Nuevo Estadio de Vallecas
June 28, 1984	Barcelona	Spain	Mini Estadi
June 30, 1984	Nantes	France	Stade Marcel Saupin
July 1, 1984	Paris	France	Parc de Sceaux
July 3, 1984	Grenoble	France	Alpexpo
July 5, 1984	Newcastle	England	St James' Park
July 7, 1984	London	England	Wembley Stadium
July 8, 1984	Slane	Ireland	Slane Castle
