= They All Went to Mexico =

Single by Carlos Santana featuring Booker T. Jones and Willie Nelson

from the album Havana Moon
- B-side: "Mudbone"
- Released: 1983
- Length: 4:59
- Label: CBS
- Songwriter(s): Greg Brown
- Producer(s): Carlos Santana; Booker T. Jones; Barry Beckett; Jerry Wexler

"They All Went to Mexico" is a song written by Greg Brown, and recorded by Carlos Santana with Willie Nelson on vocals for Santana's 1983 album Havana Moon.

The 'going to Mexico' of the song title is a metaphor. Despite its upbeat, happy tune, the song is, at its heart, about death. The singer reflects on his long life, and how his dog, wife and friends have predeceased him. Ultimately he looks forward philosophically to his own demise.

== Charts ==
Chart (1983)	Peak position
Belgian VRT Top 30	8
Dutch Top 40	7
Euro Hit 40	16

== Personnel ==
- Willie Nelson – vocals
- Carlos Santana – guitar, backing vocals, producer
- Booker T. Jones – keyboards, producer
- Barry Beckett – keyboards, producer
- Mic Gillette – trumpet
- Flaco Jiménez – accordion
- David Hood – bass guitar
- Graham Lear – drums
- Armando Peraza – percussion
- Raúl Rékow – percussion, backing vocals
- Orestes Vilató – percussion, backing vocals
- Jerry Wexler – producer
