= Summum (Grenoble) =

Theatre located in Grenoble, France

Coordinates: 45°09′20″N 5°44′15″E

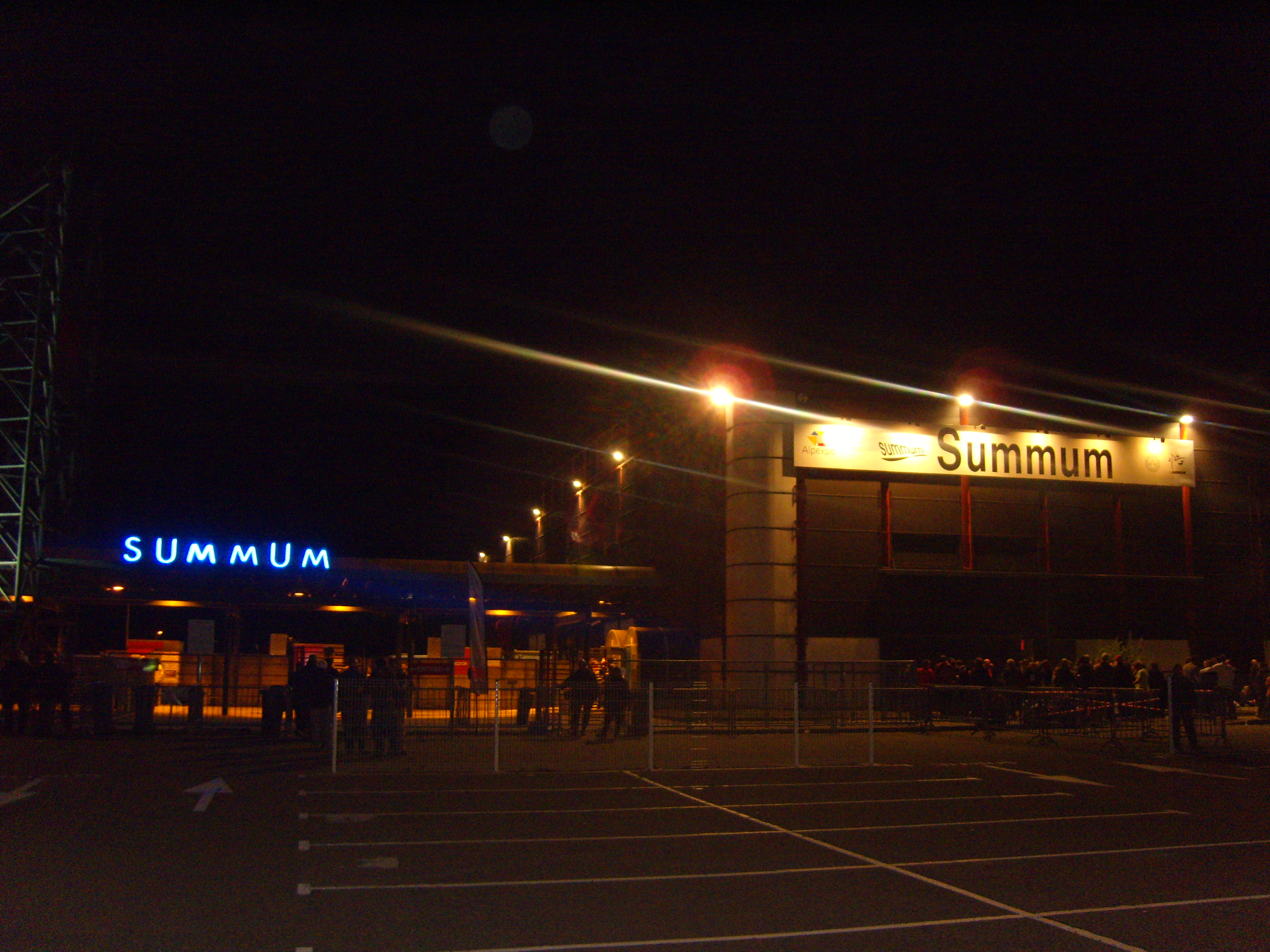
Summum

The Summum is a theatre located in Grenoble, France. It can seat 2,990 people and has a capacity of 5,000 with standing room. By capacity it is the second largest indoor performance venue in Grenoble after the Palais des Sports. The hall opened in 1988 and is part of Alpexpo. Notable past performers include Blue Öyster Cult, Deep Purple, Robert Plant, Yes, Mylène Farmer, Morcheeba and Nirvana.
