= Havana Moon =

Studio album by Carlos Santana
- Released: April 1, 1983
- Recorded: The Automatt, San Francisco, CA
- Length: 46:08
- Label: Columbia/CBS
- Producers: Jerry Wexler, Barry Beckett

Carlos Santana chronology
| Shangó (1982) | Havana Moon (1983) | Beyond Appearances (1985) |

Havana Moon is a solo album by Carlos Santana, released in 1983.

It features covers of Bo Diddley and Chuck Berry songs and performances by Booker T Jones, Willie Nelson and the Fabulous Thunderbirds, and also Carlos' father José singing "Vereda Tropical", a song Carlos had first heard when his father was serenading his mother following an argument.

== Reception ==
Professional ratings
Review scores
| Source | Rating |
|---|---|
| AllMusic | 3/5 stars |
| Robert Christgau | B+ |
| Rolling Stone | 3/5 stars |

J. D. Considine of Rolling Stone deemed Carlos Santana recording Tex-Mex music to be a natural fit, and felt that the Fabulous Thunderbirds were ideal collaborators for such a project. He particularly praised the renditions of "Who Do you Love" and "Havana Moon" for throwing in inspired Tex-Mex elements while staying true to the appeal of the original recordings. However, he found the album's roaming to other styles on the six cuts recorded without the Fabulous Thunderbirds to be dissatisfying, remarking, "It's not so much that Havana Moon is inconsistent — although it's that, too — as it is confusing, jumping from style to style as if Carlos Santana weren't sure what he wanted to do. It's nice to see that he's eager to expand his horizons, but it's disappointing that he undercuts his efforts by attempting to cover all the bases."

== Track listing ==
=== Side one ===
1. "Watch Your Step" (Phil Belmonte, Bobby Parker) – 4:01
2. "Lightnin'" (Booker T. Jones, Carlos Santana) – 3:51
3. "Who Do You Love?" (Ellas McDaniel) – 2:55
4. "Mudbone" (Santana) – 5:51
5. "One with You" (Jones) – 5:14

=== Side two ===
1. "Ecuador" (Santana) – 1:10
2. "Tales of Kilimanjaro" (Alan Pasqua, Armando Peraza, Raul Rekow, Santana) – 4:50
3. "Havana Moon" (Chuck Berry) – 4:09
4. "Daughter of the Night" (Hasse Huss, Mikael Rickfors) – 4:18
5. "They All Went to Mexico" (Greg Brown) – 4:47
6. "Vereda Tropical" (Gonzalo Curiel) – 4:57

== Personnel ==
- Roberto Moreno – vocals
- Willie Nelson – vocals
- Greg Walker – vocals
- Candelario Lopez – vocals
- Carlos Santana – guitar, percussion, backing vocals
- José Santana – violin, vocals
- Chris Solberg – keyboards, guitar, vocals
- Jimmie Vaughan – guitar
- Booker T. Jones – keyboards, backing vocals
- Richard Baker – keyboards
- Barry Beckett – keyboards
- Alan Pasqua – keyboards, vocals
- Flaco Jiménez – accordion
- Orestes Vilató – flute, percussion, timbales, backing vocals
- Kim Wilson – harmonica, backing vocals
- Greg Adams – strings, horn
- Jose Salcedo – trombone, trumpet
- Óscar Chávez – trombone, trumpet
- Mic Gillette – trumpet, horn
- Lanette Stevens – backing vocals
- Emilio Castillo – horn, backing vocals
- Marc Russo – horn
- Tramaine Hawkins – backing vocals
- Stephen Kupka – horn
- Gabriel Arias – violin
- Francisco Coronado – violin
- Raymundo Coronado – violin
- Keith Ferguson – bass
- Luis Gonsalez – bass
- David Hood – bass
- David Margen – bass, percussion
- Fran Christina – drums
- Armando Peraza – percussion, bongos, vocals
- Graham Lear – percussion, drums
- Raul Rékow – percussion, conga, backing vocals
- Alex Ligertwood – percussion, vocals
- Cherline Hall – backing vocals

== Charts ==
| Chart (1983) | Peak position |
|---|---|
| Australian Albums (Kent Music Report) | 32 |
| Austrian Albums (Ö3 Austria) | 18 |
| Canada Top Albums/CDs (RPM) | 54 |
| Dutch Albums (Album Top 100) | 16 |
| Finnish Albums (The Official Finnish Charts) | 7 |
| German Albums (Offizielle Top 100) | 21 |
| Japanese Albums (Oricon) | 33 |
| Norwegian Albums (VG-lista) | 6 |
| Swedish Albums (Sverigetopplistan) | 6 |
| UK Albums (Official Charts) | 84 |
| US Billboard 200 | 31 |
