= Kingswood Music Theatre =

15,000-seat amphitheatre at Canada's Wonderland in Vaughan, Ontario, Canada

- Kingswood
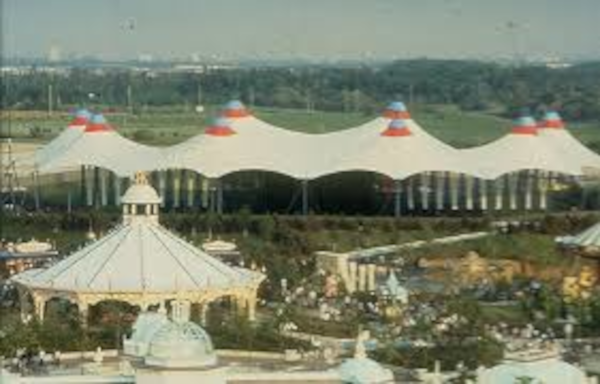
- Kingswood Music Theatre
- Interactive map of Kingswood Music Theatre
- Address: 1 Canada's Wonderland Drive; Maple, Ontario, Canada L6A 1S6
- Location: Canada's Wonderland
- Coordinates: 43°50′22″N 79°32′22″W
- Owner: Six Flags Entertainment Corporation
- Seating type: Reserved seating, lawn seating
- Capacity: 15,000
- Type: Amphitheatre

Construction
- Built: 1982
- Opened: 1983
- Closed: 2019

Website
- canadaswonderland.com

Kingswood Music Theatre was a 15,000-seat amphitheatre located at Canada's Wonderland in Vaughan, Ontario. Kingswood was open from May to September. The facility opened in 1983. The last concert was in 2019 and the property is currently being used for storage.

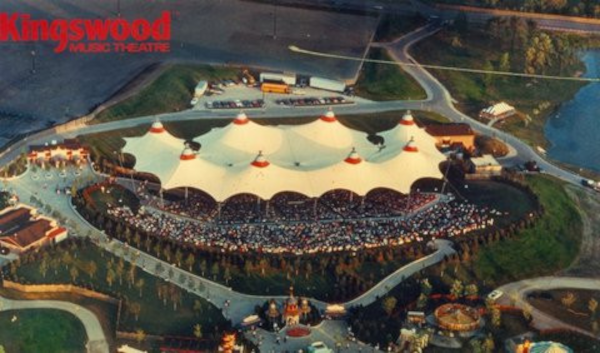
Kingswood Music Theater Postcard

Kingswood was an open-air covered amphitheatre with reserve seating and exposed lawn seats for the audience.

The Nederlander Organization was involved in concert promotion at the Kingswood Music Theatre at Canada's Wonderland when the venue first opened in the early 1980s. However, their involvement was reportedly short-lived due to disappointing crowds and noise complaints from local residents.

On August 18, 1986, the reunion of Canadian folk duo Ian & Sylvia was filmed at Kingswood by CBC Television, with guests Gordon Lightfoot, Judy Collins, Emmylou Harris and Murray McLachlan.

After the Molson Amphitheatre opened in 1995 and Air Canada Centre opened in 1999 in more populous and centralized downtown Toronto the use of Kingswood as a music venue declined. Cultural festivals at the theatre became more prominent. The box office at the gates of Wonderland was removed because of the decline of the theatre as a music venue. As of April 2026, Canada's Wonderland removed Kingswood's entrance gates in the park.

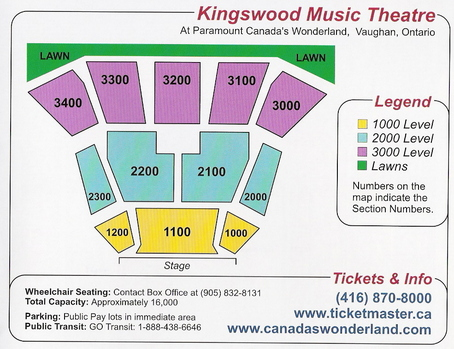
Kingswood Music Theater Seating Chart

== Performers ==
Many notable artists and bands have played the concert venue, including Harry Belafonte, Johnny Mathis, Eric Clapton, John Denver, Bette Midler, Donna Summer, Laura Branigan, David Lee Roth, The Fugees, Cypress Hill, A Tribe Called Quest, Busta Rhymes, Simple Minds, The Cure, Depeche Mode, The Smiths and the Grateful Dead - who played two gigs three years apart in June 1984 and June 1987. Canadian rock musician Kim Mitchell, won an award for ticket sales of over 100,000 tickets for his multiple performances at the venue.

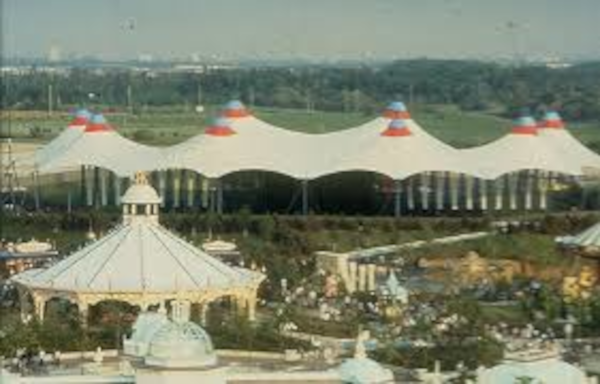
Kingswood Music Theater 80's

Other notable artists and bands having played the concert venue include:

- April Wine, Animotion, Arlo Guthrie, Aerosmith, Aldo Nova, Asia & America
- B-52's, Book Of Love, Bow Wow Wow, Bullett Boys, Barney Bentall & The Legendary Hearts, Belinda Carlisle, Barry Manilow, Beach Boys, Big Country, Billy Bragg, B.B. King, Barenaked Ladies, Bryan Adams, Burton Cummings & Bob Dylan, Bad Company, Bob Seger
- Chicago, Chalk Circle, Crowded House, China Crisis, Cinderella, Corey Hart, Crosby Stills & Nash, Cracker, Culture Club & Conway Twitty
- Duran Duran, Depeche Mode, Damn Yankees, David Crowder Band, Debbie Gibson, Don Henley, Deborah Harry & Duke Jupiter
- Erasure, Extreme, Eurythmics & Elvis Costello
- Foreigner, Firehouse, Fine Young Cannibals & Fleetwood Mac
- Glass Tiger, George Thorogood & The Destroyers, Gowan, Georgia Satellites, Gang Of Four, George Clinton & The P-Funk All Stars & George Benson
- Hall & Oates, Huey Lewis & The News, Heart, Honeymoon Suite, Haywire, Howard Jones, Harlequin & Herb Alpert & The Tijuana Brass
- INXS, Iggy Pop & Iron Maiden
- Jeff Beck, Joe Walsh, Jackson Browne, Julian Lennon & Jimmy Buffett
- Kenny Loggins, Kool & The Gang & Korn
- Little Feat, Liza Minnelli, Lou Reed, Lynyrd Skynyrd, Linda Ronstadt, Little River Band & Lou Rawls
- Morrissey, Martha & The Muffins, Mercy Me, Midnight Oil, Mr. Big, Men Without Hats & Melissa Manchester, Michael W. Smith, Mike & The Mechanics
- Night Ranger, Neil Young & New Order New Kids On The Block
- Orbital & Orion The Hunter
- Poison, Public Enemy, Pete Seeger, Platinum Blonde, Peter Murphy, Procol Harum, Peter Paul & Mary & Paul Anka
- Rihanna, Roger Waters, Roger Daltrey & Red Rider
- Squeeze, Santana, Souxsie & The Banshees, Sisters Of Mercy, Scorpions, Slaughter, Smithereens, Sting, Stevie Nicks, Stevie Ray Vaughan, Steve Earle & The Dukes, Steve Miller Band, Screaming Trees, Soul Asylum, Shirley Bassey, Skillet, Santers & Sherry Kean
- The Go-Go's, Talk Talk, The Replacements, Terence Trent D'Arby, Tom Petty & The Heartbreakers, The English Beat, The Spoons, The Turtles, The Psychedelic Furs, Triumph, Teenage Head, The Band, The Pretenders, Talking Heads, The Cure, The Pogues, The Ramones, Tool, The Beach Boys, The Moody Blues, Trixter, The Kinks, The Bangles, The Rainmakers, The Fixx, The Tenants, The Stray Cats, The Hooters, Tracy Chapman, Tina Turner, Traffic, The Roots, The Allman Brothers, 10,000 Maniacs, The Osmonds, The Hollies, Tony Casey, The Kings & The Tubes Tiffany
- UB40
- Violent Femmes & Van Morrison
- Warrior Soul, World Party, Warrant & Winger
- ZZ Top

== Decline and Demolition ==
While the venue saw a decline in major touring acts following the opening of the Molson Amphitheatre in 1995, its ultimate closure was heavily influenced by long-term land-use planning constraints. In 1998, the Ontario Municipal Board (OMB) approved Official Plan Amendment (OPA) 508, which reclassified the surrounding lands as an "Urban Centre." This legal order mandated strict noise mitigation measures for Kingswood, including a requirement for regular acoustical audits to ensure compatibility with new high-density residential developments planned to the east along Jane Street.

Further expansion or modernization of the theatre was limited by the sale of approximately 82 acres of park-owned land north of Major Mackenzie Drive to the City of Vaughan in 2009 for $60 million. This land, originally earmarked for theme park growth in OPA 508, was subsequently developed into the Cortellucci Vaughan Hospital and the broader Vaughan Healthcare Centre Precinct. The 1998 OMB order had explicitly prohibited the construction of any new outdoor amphitheatre with a capacity exceeding 10,000 patrons on these northern lands, effectively preventing the park from relocating or replacing the venue away from residential zones.

After remaining largely dormant following the 2019 season, the physical removal of the Kingswood Music Theatre gates and peripheral structures began in April 2026.

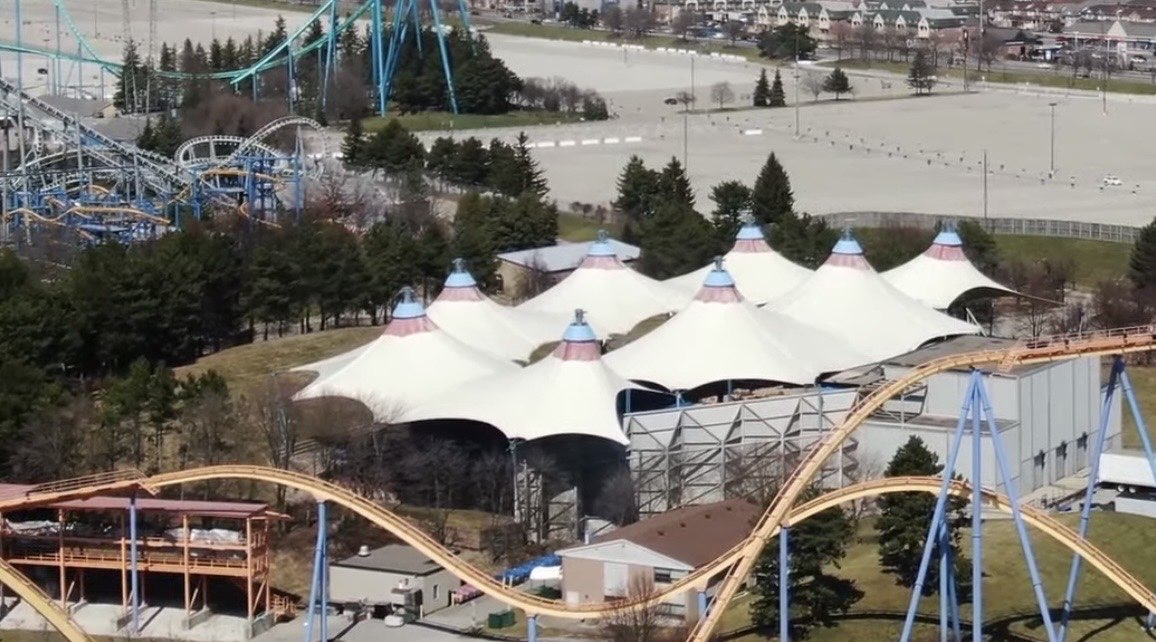
Kingswood Music Theater 2021

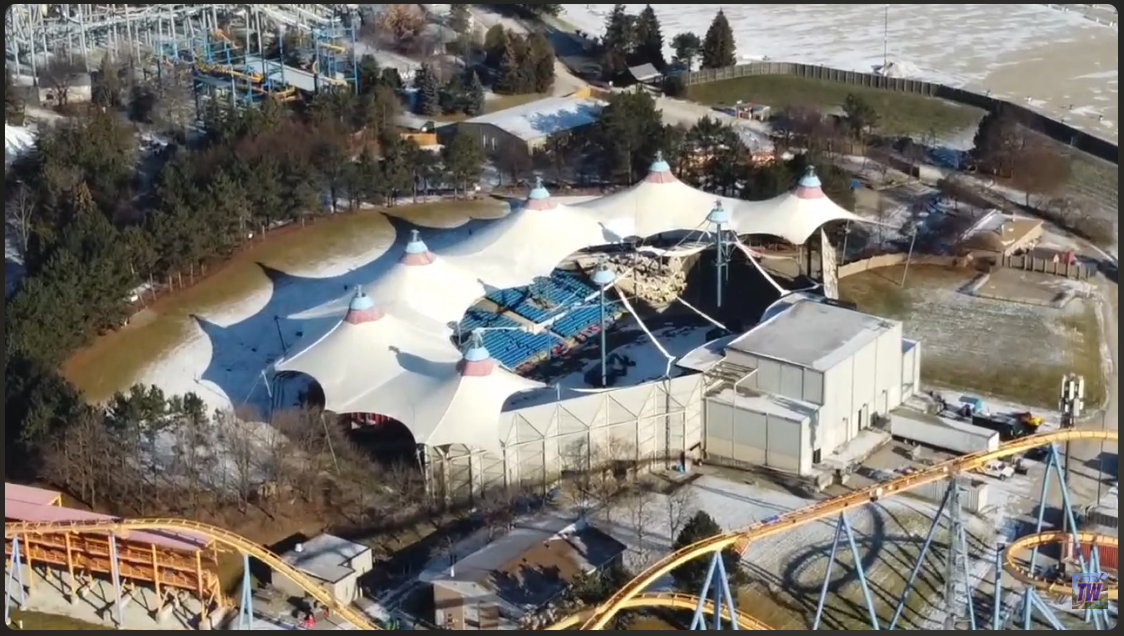
Kingswood Music Theater 2022

== See also ==
- List of contemporary amphitheatres
