= Alpexpo =

Coordinates: 45.1549°N 5.7360°E

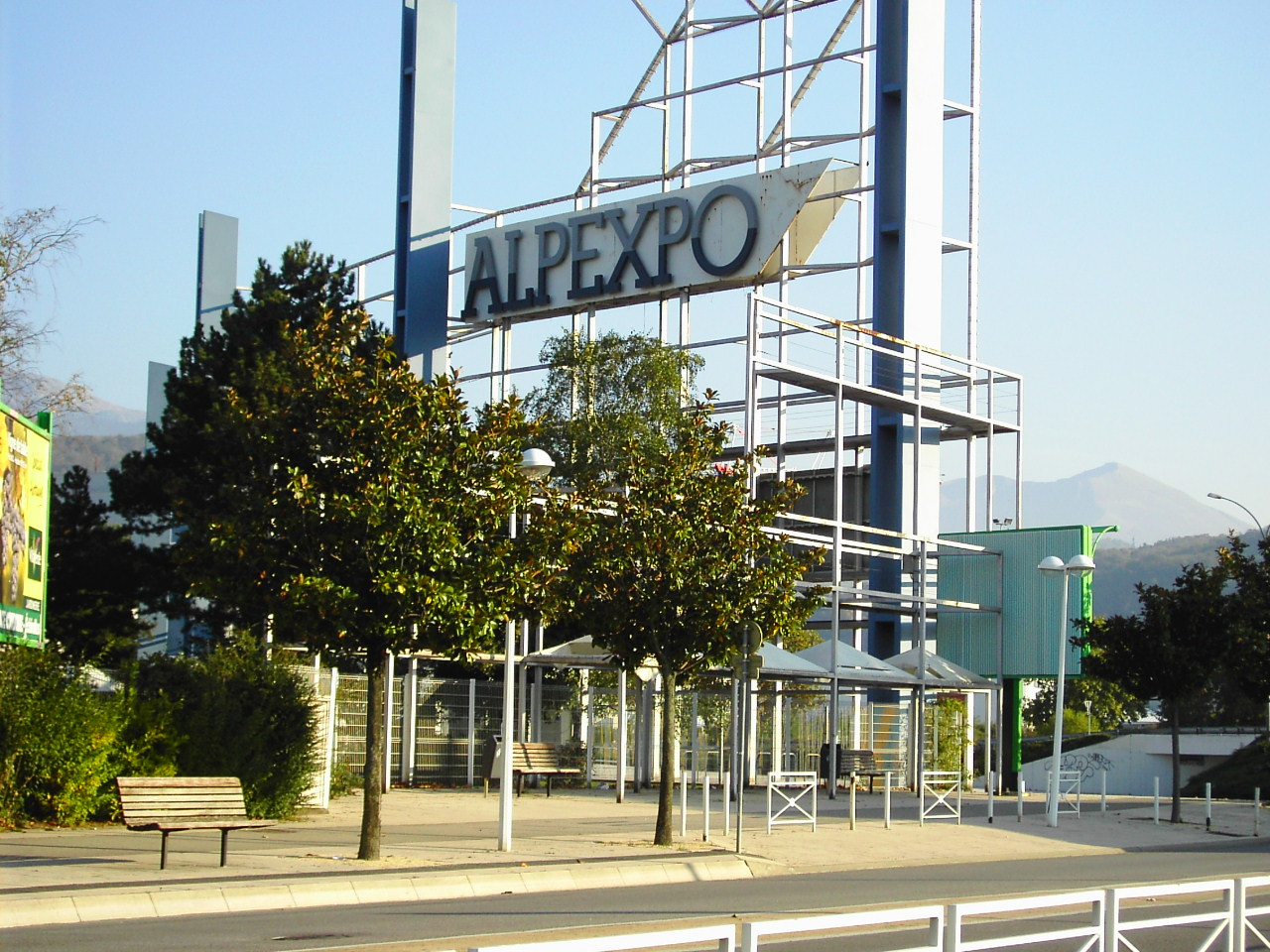
Alpexpo

Alpexpo is a convention center located in Grenoble, France. It opened in 1968 to serve as a bus station for the 1968 Winter Olympics. In 1988 the Summum was integrated into the facility. Alpexpo has hosted concerts by notable artists such as Bob Dylan, Rainbow, Judas Priest, Scorpions and Ted Nugent.

== Events ==
Since 2012, Alpexpo hosts two major scientific events with Semicon Europa organized alternately with the city of Dresden and IoT Planet one of the largest European events related to the Internet of things.

== Bibliography ==
- Pierre Frappat, Les Jeux Olympiques à Grenoble : une ville industrielle saisie par le sport, Revue de géographie alpine, volume 79, numéro 3, année 1991, pages 45-48(in French).
