= Cal Expo Amphitheatre =

Amphitheatre in Sacramento, California, US

The Cal Expo Amphitheatre was a 14,000-capacity outdoor amphitheatre located in Sacramento, California, on the site of the California Exposition.

The Cal Expo Amphitheatre opened in 1983 and hosted artists such as Judas Priest, Bon Jovi, Van Halen, Rush, Metallica, Iron Maiden, Aerosmith, Bob Dylan, Depeche Mode and Phish.

The Grateful Dead played Cal Expo twenty-five times between 1984 and 1994. Their album Road Trips Volume 2 Number 4 was recorded at Cal Expo.

The venue closed September 1998. The site is now home to Heart Health Park.
