= Freedom (Santana album) =

Studio album by Santana
- Released: February 1987
- Studio: The Plant Studios, Sausalito, California
- Length: 46:52
- Label: Columbia
- Producer: Jeffrey Cohen, Carlos Santana; with: Chester D. Thompson, Sterling Crew

Santana chronology
Beyond Appearances (1985)	Freedom (1987)	Viva Santana! (1988)

Professional ratings
Review scores
Source	Rating
Allmusic	3/5 stars
Rolling Stone	(mixed)
The Rolling Stone Album Guide	2.5/5 stars

Freedom is the fifteenth studio album by Santana. By this recording, Santana had nine members, some of whom had returned after being with the band in previous versions. Freedom moved away from the more poppy sound of the previous album, Beyond Appearances, and back to the band's original Latin rock. However, it failed to revive Santana's commercial fortunes, reaching only ninety-five on the album chart.

== Track listing ==
=== Side one ===
1. "Veracruz" (Jeffrey Cohen, Buddy Miles, Gregg Rolie, Carlos Santana) – 4:23
2. "She Can't Let Go" (Cohen, Tom Coster, Alphonso Johnson, Cory Lerios) – 4:45
3. "Once It's Gotcha" (Cohen, Coster, Johnson) – 5:42
4. "Love Is You" [Instrumental] (Santana, Chester D. Thompson) – 3:54
5. "Songs of Freedom" (Coster, Miles, Santana) – 4:28

=== Side two ===
1. "Deeper, Dig Deeper" (Sterling Crew, Miles, Santana, Thompson) – 4:18
2. "Praise" (Crew, Miles, Santana, Thompson) – 4:36
3. "Mandela" [Instrumental] (Armando Peraza) – 5:31
4. "Before We Go" (Jim Capaldi, Santana) – 3:54
5. "Victim of Circumstance" (Crew, Miles, Gary Rashid, Santana) – 5:21

== Personnel ==
- Carlos Santana – guitar, vocals
- Tom Coster – keyboards
- Chester D. Thompson – keyboards
- Gregg Rolie – synthesizer, keyboards
- Sterling Crew – keyboards/synths
- Alphonso Johnson – bass
- Graham Lear – drums
- Armando Peraza – percussion, conga
- Orestes Vilató – percussion, timbales
- Raul Rekow – percussion, conga, vocals
- Buddy Miles – vocals

== Charts ==
Chart (1987)	Peak position
Australian Albums (Kent Music Report)	83
Austrian Albums (Ö3 Austria)	24
Dutch Albums (Album Top 100)	44
Finnish Albums (The Official Finnish Charts)	10
German Albums (Offizielle Top 100)	23
Japanese Albums (Oricon)	75
Norwegian Albums (VG-lista)	11
Swedish Albums (Sverigetopplistan)	20
Swiss Albums (Schweizer Hitparade)	9
US Billboard 200	95
