= Arènes de Fréjus =

Ancient Roman amphitheater in Fréjus, France

Coordinates: 43.434°N 6.729°E

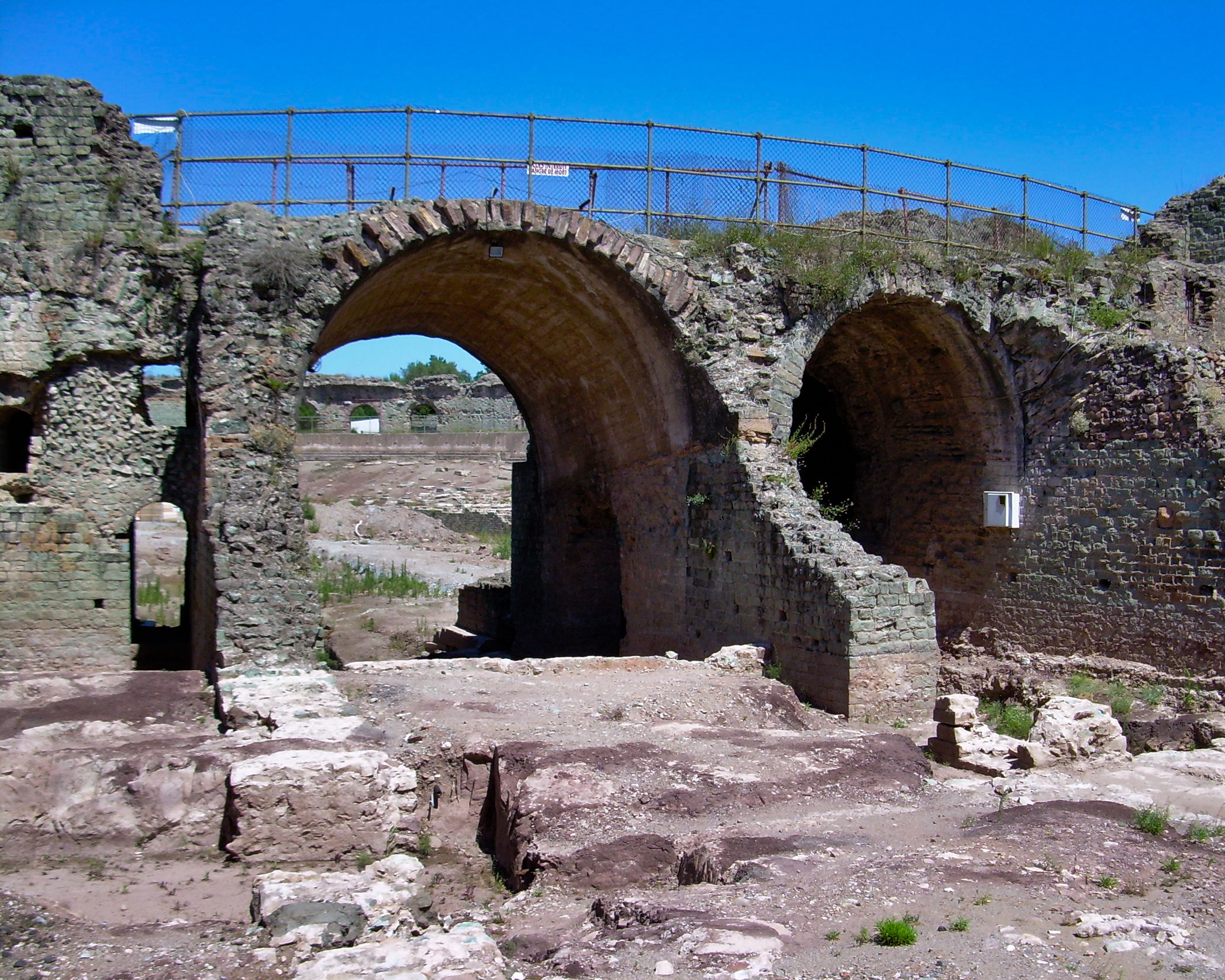
Arènes de Fréjus in 2007

Arènes de Fréjus or Amphithéâtre de Fréjus is a 12,000-capacity Roman amphitheatre located in Fréjus, France. The structure was built in the 1st century. In recent times the arena has been used for major rock concerts, hosting artists such as Roxy Music, Rod Stewart, Queen, Iron Maiden, David Bowie and Tina Turner.

== See also ==
- List of Roman amphitheatres
