= Viva Santana! =

Compilation album by Santana
- Released: August 1988
- Genre: Blues rock; hard rock; latin rock
- Length: 2:23:44
- Label: CBS
- Producer: Carlos Santana, Jim Gaines

Santana chronology
Freedom (1987)	Viva Santana! (1988)	Spirits Dancing in the Flesh (1990)

Professional ratings
Review scores
Source	Rating
Allmusic	4.5/5 stars
The Rolling Stone Album Guide	4/5 stars

Viva Santana! is a 1988 compilation album by Santana.

The album's thirty tracks aim to provide an overview of Santana's first twenty years, concentrating on the late 1960s, 1970s and early 1980s. It includes mostly live, previously unreleased versions of popular tracks and a few new, unreleased songs. Of the six previously released studio tracks included, only "Evil Ways" is in its original version. Four tracks were remixed in 1988 and one other is from a rehearsal session with new added vocal and remix done in 1987. The album peaked at #142 on the Billboard 200 chart.

== Track listing ==
=== Disc one ===
1. "Everybody's Everything" (1988 remix with added crowd noise) – 3:31
2. "Black Magic Woman/Gypsy Queen" (1988 remix) – 5:21
3. "Guajira" (1988 remix) – 5:39
4. "Jungle Strut" (Live in Montreux, Switzerland, 1971) – 5:30
5. "Jingo" (1988 remix) – 4:14
6. "Ballin'" (Previously unreleased studio track, 1967) – 6:25
7. "Bambara" (Previously unreleased Zebop! rehearsal jam, 1980) – 1:27
8. "Angel Negro" (Previously unreleased Shangó outtake, 1982) – 4:10
9. "Incident at Neshabur" (Live at Fillmore West, San Francisco, California, 1971; from Fillmore: The Last Days album) – 5:31
10. "Just Let the Music Speak" (Previously unreleased Freedom outtake, 1986) – 4:40
11. "Super Boogie/Hong Kong Blues" (Previously unreleased songs; (Live in West Hartford, Connecticut, 1985) – 12:27
12. "Song of the Wind" (Live in Frejus, France, 1977) – 5:03
13. "Abi Cama" (Live in Paris, France, 1983) – 1:49
14. "Vilato" (Live in Paris, France, 1983) – 0:44
15. "Paris Finale" (Live in Paris, France, 1983) – 3:38

=== Disc two ===
1. "Brotherhood" (Live 1985) – 4:21
2. "Open Invitation" (Live at The Warfield, San Francisco, California, 1985) – 6:21
3. "Aqua Marine" (Live) - 6:47
4. "Dance Sister Dance (Baila Mi Hermana)" (Live at California Jam II, Ontario, California, 1978) – 6:39
5. "Europa (Earth's Cry Heaven's Smile)" (Live in Osaka, Japan, 1979) – 7:11
6. "Peraza I" (Previously unreleased rehearsal jam, 1985) – 2:42
7. "She's Not There" (Live at The Warfield, San Francisco, California, 1985) – 4:21
8. "Bambele" (Live at Winterland Ballroom, San Francisco, California, 1973; previously unreleased) – 2:50
9. "Evil Ways" (Original version) – 3:55
10. "Daughter of the Night" (Havana Moon rehearsal, 1982 with new vocal and remix, 1987) – 4:51
11. "Peraza II" (Previously unreleased rehearsal jam, 1985) – 1:26
12. "Black Magic Woman/Gypsy Queen" (Live in Montreal, Quebec, Canada, 1982) – 6:24
13. "Oye Como Va" (Live in Montreal, Quebec, Canada, 1982) – 4:13
14. "Persuasion" (Live at the Woodstock Festival, Bethel, New York, Saturday, August 16, 1969; previously unreleased) – 2:52
15. "Soul Sacrifice" (Live at the Woodstock Festival, Bethel, New York, Saturday, August 16, 1969; edited version) – 8:49

== Charts ==
Chart (1988)	Peak position
US Billboard 200	142

== Certifications ==
Region	Certification	Certified units/sales
United States (RIAA)	Gold	500,000^{^}
^{^} Shipments figures based on certification alone.
