= Beyond Appearances =

Studio album by Santana
- Released: February 1985
- Recorded: March 28 – November 1, 1984
- Studios: Record One (Los Angeles); Plant Studios (Sausalito, California)
- Genre: Rock
- Length: 44:39
- Label: Columbia
- Producer: Val Garay

Santana chronology
Shangó (1982)	Beyond Appearances (1985)	Freedom (1987)

Professional ratings
Review scores
Source	Rating
Allmusic	2/5 stars
Rolling Stone	(unfavorable)
The Rolling Stone Album Guide	2/5 stars

Beyond Appearances is the fourteenth studio album by Santana, released in 1985 (see 1985 in music).

The album took seven months to make, and involved a mostly different line-up from the previous one, Shangó (released in 1982): apart from Carlos Santana, singer Alex Ligertwood and percussionists Armando Peraza, Raul Rekow and Orestes Vilató were still with the band. This was singer Greg Walker's first album with Santana since Inner Secrets - he had left in 1979, and returned in 1983. As a result, the band had two vocalists at the time. It also was bassist Alphonso Johnson's first of two albums with the group, having joined in 1984; and the only one to feature Chester Thompson on drums and David Sancious on keyboards. It also was the first with Chester D. Thompson on keyboards; he would remain with the band until the 2000s.

Musically, it was firmly in the style of the 1980s, making much use of synthesizers and drum machines.

Beyond Appearances performed relatively poorly, reaching only fifty on the Billboard album chart; one of its tracks, "Say It Again", reached number 46 on the Billboard Hot 100 singles chart (though it performed better on Billboard's Mainstream Rock Tracks chart, reaching number fifteen).

== Track listing ==
=== Original vinyl release side one ===
1. "Breaking Out" (Alphonso Johnson, Alex Ligertwood) – 4:30
2. "Written in Sand" (Mitchell Froom, Jerry Stahl) – 3:49
3. "How Long" (Robbie Patton) – 4:00
4. "Brotherhood" (David Sancious, Carlos Santana, Chester D. Thompson) – 2:26
5. "Spirit" (Johnson, Ligertwood, Raul Rekow) – 5:04

=== Original vinyl release side two ===
1. "Say It Again" (Val Garay, Steve Goldstein, Anthony La Peau) – 3:27
2. "Who Loves You" (Santana, Thompson, Orestes Vilato) – 4:06
3. "I'm the One Who Loves You" (Curtis Mayfield) – 3:17
4. "Touchdown Raiders" (Santana) – 3:08
5. "Right Now" (Ligertwood, Santana) – 5:58

=== CD release ===
1. "Breaking Out" (Johnson, Ligertwood) – 4:30
2. "Written in Sand" (Mitchell Froom, Jerry Stahl) – 3:49
3. "Brotherhood" (Sancious, Santana, Thompson) – 2:26
4. "Spirit" (Johnson, Ligertwood, Rekow) – 5:04
5. "Right Now" (Ligertwood, Santana) – 5:58
6. "Who Loves You" (Santana, Thompson, Vilato) – 4:06
7. "I'm the One Who Loves You" (Mayfield) – 3:17
8. "Say It Again" (Garay, Goldstein, La Peau) – 3:27
9. "Two Points of View" (Ligertwood, Santana) – 4:54
10. "How Long" (Patton) – 4:00
11. "Touchdown Raiders" (Santana) – 3:08

== Personnel ==
- Carlos Santana – guitar, acoustic 12-string guitar, vocals
- Alphonso Johnson – bass
- Chester D. Thompson – synthesizer, bass, keyboards, organ
- David Sancious – rhythm guitar, keyboards, synthesizer, guitar
- Chester Cortez Thompson – drums, bass pedals
- Greg Walker – lead and background vocals
- Alex Ligertwood – rhythm guitar, lead and background vocals, harmony
- Bryan Garofalo – bass
- Steve Goldstein – synthesizer, Fairlight CMI, keyboards
- Craig Krampf – drums, DMX drum machine
- Armando Peraza – bongos, percussion, shakers, congas
- Orestes Vilato – bells, timbales, percussion, cymbals, woodblocks, vocals
- Mitchell Froom – string synthesizer
- Raul Rekow – chekere, congas, shakers, vocals
- David Adelstein – synthesizer, DMX drum machine, synthesizer bass
- John Woodhead – guitar
- Anthony LaPeau – background vocals
- Craig Hull – guitar
- F. Bob Getter – string bass

== Credits ==
- "How Long" arrangement: Robbie Patton, David Adelstein
- "Say It Again" associate producer: Steve Goldstein
- Mitchell Froom appears courtesy of Slash Records
- Recorded by Val Garay & Richard Bosworth at Record One, Los Angeles
- Assisted by Duane Seykora
- Mixed by Val Garay at Record One
- Additional recording: Plant Studios, Sausalito
- Assistant engineer: Wayne Lewis, Glen Holguin
- "Right Now" mixed by Jim Gaines
- All information gathered from back cover of vinyl release.

== Charts ==
=== Weekly charts ===
Chart (1985)	Peak position
Australian Albums (Kent Music Report)	57
Austrian Albums (Ö3 Austria)	24
Canada Top Albums/CDs (RPM)	89
Dutch Albums (Album Top 100)	44
European Albums (European Top 100 Albums)	20
Finnish Albums (The Official Finnish Charts)	24
German Albums (Offizielle Top 100)	20
Japanese Albums (Oricon)	37
Norwegian Albums (VG-lista)	11
Swedish Albums (Sverigetopplistan)	20
Swiss Albums (Schweizer Hitparade)	9
UK Albums (Official Charts)	58
US Billboard 200	50

=== Year-end charts ===
Chart (1985)	Position
US AOR (Radio & Records)	84
