= Orestes Vilató =

Cuban percussionist

Orestes Vilató (born 12 May 1944 in Camagüey, Cuba) is a Cuban percussionist who has worked as a sideman with Ray Barretto, Johnny Pacheco, Cachao, and the Fania All-Stars. Vilató also worked with Carlos Santana, for whom he played timbales, percussion and sang backing vocals. He moved to New York City when he was 12 years old, after his father was hired by the Cuban airline Cubana de Aviación.He is considered to be one of the foremost timbaleros in the salsa genre. He has been a strong musical presence in the San Francisco Bay Area music scene playing with several groups like the Machete Ensemble and Los Kimbos. He has also been an influential music mentor to many owing to his deep musical knowledge and generous nature.

== Discography ==
With Bobby Hutcherson

- Ambos Mundos (Landmark, 1989)

With Buddy Montgomery

- So Why Not? (Landmark, 1988)
