= Caravanserai Tour =

1972–1973 tour by Santana

- Tour by Santana
- Associated album: Caravanserai
- Start date: September 4, 1972
- End date: October 21, 1973
- Legs: 7
- No. of shows: 90 in North America; 25 in Europe; 15 in Asia; 12 in Oceania; 12 in South America; 154 in total (155 scheduled)

Santana concert chronology
- Santana III Tour (1971); Caravanserai Tour (1972–73); Welcome Tour (1973–74)

The Caravanserai Tour was a series of performances by American Latin rock band Santana in support of their album Caravanserai during 1972 and 1973. It started on September 4, 1972, at the Erie Canal Soda Pop Festival in Griffin, Indiana, and ended on October 21, 1973 at Ginasio Municipal Novo in Brasília, Brazil. This tour could be considered to be the group's most eclectic tour at this point, as the band did concerts at every continent except Africa and Antarctica, including one of the first, if not the first, tours of Latin America by a major American rock act.

The tour was the first and only tour to feature the group's second lineup, "The New Santana Band", consisting of guitarist Carlos Santana, percussionists Armando Peraza and José Areas, bassist Doug Rauch, drummer Michael Shrieve, and Tom Coster and Richard Kermode on keyboards. The group often performed material from Caravanserai along with other improvisations and covers.

Some concerts were recorded and filmed and released as albums and films. The shows on July 3 and 4, 1973 at the Osaka Kōsei Nenkin Kaikan in Osaka, Japan were released as the triple vinyl LP Lotus (1974). Select concerts during the tour's Latin American portion were filmed and incorporated into the documentary, Santana en Colores (1973).

== History ==
On October 11, 1972, Santana released Caravanserai, a major turning point in Carlos Santana's career. The album aimed towards a more experimental jazz fusion sound, a contrast from the group's earlier releases. In the same year, Santana became interested in the jazz fusion outfit Mahavishnu Orchestra and its guitarist, John McLaughlin. Aware of Santana's interest in meditation, McLaughlin introduced Santana, and his girlfriend Deborah, to his guru, Sri Chinmoy in October. Later in the month, Chinmoy accepted the Santanas as disciples. Santana was given the name Devadip, meaning "the lamp, light and eye of God" in August 1973. Santana and McLaughlin recorded an album together, Love Devotion Surrender with members of Santana and the Mahavishnu Orchestra in 1973. After becoming a disciple of the guru, Santana got his hair cut short and he started to dress in white clothes.

Some time later, Santana, having obtained legal rights to the band's name, Santana, formed a new version of the band with renowned Latin jazz percussionist Armando Peraza and Nicaraguan percussionist José Areas, Doug Rauch on bass, Michael Shrieve on drums, and Tom Coster and Richard Kermode on keyboards. Dubbed "The New Santana Band", they toured North America, South America, Europe, Asia, and Oceania in support of Caravanserai, travelling in a Lockheed L-188 Electra airliner, which generated a lot of buzz in Australia.

At the start of the European tour of 1972, a press conference was held in the afternoon of November 4, 1972, before the concert at London's Empire Pool, where Santana answered questions about his new look and spiritual direction. His devotion to Chinmoy was evident during the press conference, as a picture of Jesus was perched on top of an amplifier next to a photo of the guru during the conference. The band followed this European tour with a North American tour lasting from December 1972 to June 1973. During April to June 1973, the group took a break to record their fifth studio album, Welcome. This album was much more experimental than Santana's previous albums, and did not produce any hit singles. Though the tour mainly promoted Caravanserai, songs from upcoming Santana albums were played during this tour, such as tracks from Welcome: "Going Home", "Samba de Sausalito", "When I Look into Your Eyes", "Yours Is the Light", "Light of Life", "Welcome", and "Mantra".

After the conclusion of the North American tour, an Asian tour started, where the group played in Japan, Hong Kong and Malaysia. (Note: The concert on July 18, 1973 in Jakarta was canceled due to a typhoon.) The tour of Asia was followed by a tour of Australia and New Zealand. Another North American tour followed, and the group subsequently toured Latin America.

The tour of Latin America in late 1973 was announced around September 22, and it generated a lot of publicity as it was one of the first, if not the first, tour of Latin America by a major American rock act. When the group arrived at La Aurora International Airport in Guatemala on September 26, 1973, they were received by the daughter of President Carlos Manuel Arana Osorio and they answered questions by reporters. Later that day, the band did a benefit concert at Estadio Nacional Mateo Flores organized by First Lady Álida España and Vice President Eduardo Cáceres.

When the band landed at Las Mercedes Airport in Managua, Nicaragua on October 2, 1973, a swarm of fans mobbed the group when they were boarding their tour bus. Percussionist José Areas, who is Nicaraguan, was given a standing ovation by the crowd. Santana met up with former President Anastasio Somoza Debayle, while Areas privately traveled to León to see his family. At 8 p.m. on October 3, the group did a free benefit concert for victims of the 1972 Nicaragua earthquake at Estadio Nacional Somoza.

During October 6, 1973, at the Plaza de toros Monumental de Valencia in Valencia, Venezuela, two fans died at the concert, one man committed suicide by jumping from a tall structure located in the bullring, and a woman suffocated. In Caracas, there was a riot between the concert-goers and the police over the constant marijuana usage at the performance which resulted in hundreds of fans being detained and fifteen officials injuring themselves in the fight.

== Tour band ==
- Leon Thomas – lead vocals, sound effects, percussion (beginning June 21, 1973)
- Carlos Santana – guitar, Echoplex, percussion, vocals
- Tom Coster – Yamaha organ, Hammond organ, electric piano, percussion, vocals
- Richard Kermode – Hammond organ, Mellotron, piano, electric piano, percussion, vocals
- Doug Rauch – bass guitar
- Michael Shrieve – drums
- José "Chepito" Areas – timbales, congas, percussion, vocals
- Armando Peraza – bongos, congas, percussion
- James "Mingo" Lewis – congas, percussion (through April 8, 1973)

== Typical set lists ==
=== September–October 1972: First North American tour ===
A 16-date tour of North America started on September 4, 1972, at the Erie Canal Soda Pop Festival, held near Griffin, Indiana on Bull Island and ended on October 30, 1972 at the Academy of Music in New York City. This is a usual set list for this leg (actual set list taken from the October 15 Seattle show):

1. "A-1 Funk" (Carlos Santana, Tom Coster, Richard Kermode, Doug Rauch, Michael Shrieve, José Areas, Armando Peraza)
2. "Every Step of the Way" (Shrieve)
3. "Samba Pa Ti" (Santana)
4. "Look Up (To See What's Coming Down)" (Rauch, Gregg Rolie, Santana)
5. "Just in Time to See the Sun" (Rolie, Santana, Shrieve)
6. "Incident at Neshabur" (Alberto Gianquinto, Santana)
7. "Bambele" (Areas, Peraza)
8. "Stone Flower" (Antônio Carlos Jobim)
9. "Xibaba (She-Ba-Ba)" (Airto Moreira)
10. "Castillos de Arena Part 1 (Sand Castle)" (Joaquim Young, Santana, Coster, Kermode, Rauch, Shrieve, Areas, Peraza, Chick Corea)
11. "Free Angela" (Todd Cochran)
12. "Mantra" (Coster, Santana, Shrieve)
13. "Castillos de Arena Part 2 (Sand Castle)" (Corea, Young, Santana, Coster, Kermode, Rauch, Shrieve, Areas, Peraza)
14. "Earth"
15. "Se Acabó" (Areas)
16. "Savor" (Areas, David Brown, Michael Carabello, Rolie, Santana, Shrieve)
17. "Toussaint L'Ouverture" (Areas, Brown, Carabello, Rolie, Santana, Shrieve)
18. "Welcome" (John Coltrane)
19. "La Fuente del Ritmo" (Mingo Lewis)

On the other hand, the concert on September 12, 1972 at the Keystone in Berkeley, California was very different from the usual set list, as more songs from Caravanserai were performed on this date. The set list for this performance was as follows:

1. "Eternal Caravanserai Of Reincarnation" (Tom Rutley, Neal Schon, Shrieve)
2. "Waves Within" (Rauch, Rolie, Santana)
3. "Look Up (To See What's Coming Down)" (Rauch, Rolie, Santana)
4. "Just in Time to See the Sun" (Rolie, Santana, Shrieve)
5. "Incident at Neshabur" (Gianquinto, Santana)
6. "Se Acabó" (Areas)
7. "Bambele" (Areas, Peraza)
8. "Stone Flower" (Antônio Carlos Jobim)
9. "Batukada" (Santana, Coster, Kermode, Rauch, Shrieve, Areas, Peraza)
10. "Xibaba (She-Ba-Ba)" (Airto Moreira)
11. "Castillos de Arena Part 1 (Sand Castle)" (Joaquim Young, Santana, Coster, Kermode, Rauch, Shrieve, Areas, Peraza, Corea)
12. "Free Angela" (Cochran)
13. "Castillos de Arena Part 2 (Sand Castle)" (Corea, Young, Santana, Coster, Kermode, Rauch, Shrieve, Areas, Peraza)
14. "Earth"
15. "La Fuente del Ritmo" (Lewis)
16. "Welcome" (Coltrane)
17. "Every Step of the Way" (Shrieve)

=== November–December 1972: First tour of Europe ===
The band started a European tour on November 4, 1972 at Empire Pool in London, England, concluding on December 5, 1972 at Philips Halle in Düsseldorf, West Germany. New additions to the set list include "Going Home", which opened every concert during the entire tour, and the instrumental "Samba Pa Ti". Here is a common set list for this leg (actual set list taken from the December 1 Rotterdam gig):

1. "Going Home" (Anton Dvorák; arranged by Alice Coltrane, Santana, Coster, Kermode, Rauch, Shrieve, Areas, Peraza)
2. "A-1 Funk" (Santana, Coster, Kermode, Rauch, Shrieve, Areas, Peraza)
3. "Every Step of the Way" (Shrieve)
4. "Samba Pa Ti" (Santana)
5. "Look Up (To See What's Coming Down)" (Rauch, Rolie, Santana)
6. "Just in Time to See the Sun" (Rolie, Santana, Shrieve)
7. "Incident at Neshabur" (Gianquinto, Santana)
8. "Bambele" (Areas, Peraza)
9. "Stone Flower" (Jobim)
10. "Batukada" (Santana, Coster, Kermode, Rauch, Shrieve, Areas, Peraza)
11. "Xibaba (She-Ba-Ba)" (Moreira)
12. "Waiting" (Santana)
13. "Castillos de Arena Part 1 (Sand Castle)" (Joaquim Young, Santana, Coster, Kermode, Rauch, Shrieve, Areas, Peraza, Corea)
14. "Free Angela" (Cochran)
15. "Mantra" (Coster, Santana, Shrieve)
16. "Castillos de Arena Part 2 (Sand Castle)" (Corea, Young, Santana, Coster, Kermode, Rauch, Shrieve, Areas, Peraza)
17. "Earth"
18. "Se Acabó" (Areas)
19. "Savor" (Areas, Brown, Carabello, Rolie, Santana, Shrieve)
20. "Toussaint L'Ouverture" (Areas, Brown, Carabello, Rolie, Santana, Shrieve)

=== December 1972–June 1973: Second tour of North America ===
A tour of North America began on December 9, 1972 at Loyola Field House in New Orleans, Louisiana and ended on June 21, 1973 at the Anchorage Sports Arena in Anchorage, Alaska. A new song, "Kyoto", was added to the set list. Here is a typical set list for this leg (actual set list taken from the January 30 San Diego show):

1. "Going Home" (Dvorák; arr.: Coltrane, Santana, Coster, Kermode, Rauch, Shrieve, Areas, Peraza)
2. "A-1 Funk" (Santana, Coster, Kermode, Rauch, Shrieve, Areas, Peraza)
3. "Every Step of the Way" (Shrieve)
4. "Samba Pa Ti" (Santana)
5. "Look Up (To See What's Coming Down)" (Rauch, Rolie, Santana)
6. "Just in Time to See the Sun" (Rolie, Santana, Shrieve)
7. "Incident at Neshabur" (Gianquinto, Santana)
8. "Bambele" (Areas, Peraza)
9. "Stone Flower" (Jobim)
10. "Batukada" (Santana, Coster, Kermode, Rauch, Shrieve, Areas, Peraza)
11. "Xibaba (She-Ba-Ba)" (Moreira)
12. "Waiting" (Santana)
13. "Castillos de Arena Part 1 (Sand Castle)" (Joaquim Young, Santana, Coster, Kermode, Rauch, Shrieve, Areas, Peraza, Chick Corea)
14. "Free Angela" (Todd Cochran)
15. Concierto de Aranjuez (Joaquín Rodrigo)
16. "Mantra" (Coster, Santana, Shrieve)
17. "Kyoto" (Shrieve)
18. "Castillos de Arena Part 2 (Sand Castle)" (Corea, Young, Santana, Coster, Kermode, Rauch, Shrieve, Areas, Peraza)
19. "Earth"
20. "Se Acabó" (Areas)
21. "Savor" (Areas, Brown, Carabello, Rolie, Santana, Shrieve)
22. "Toussaint L'Ouverture" (Areas, Brown, Carabello, Rolie, Santana, Shrieve)

=== June–July 1973: Asian tour ===
The group started their very first tour of Asia on June 27, 1973 at the Fukuoka Kyuden Kinen Gymnasium in Fukuoka, Japan and ended on July 19, 1973 at Stadium Negara in Kuala Lumpur, Malaysia. A live album, Lotus, was recorded during this tour. The album's track listing is as follows:

1. "Going Home" (Dvorák; arr.: Coltrane, Santana, Coster, Kermode, Rauch, Shrieve, Areas, Peraza)
2. "A-1 Funk" (Santana, Coster, Kermode, Rauch, Shrieve, Areas, Peraza)
3. "Every Step of the Way" (Shrieve)
4. "Black Magic Woman" (Peter Green)
5. "Gypsy Queen" (Gábor Szabó)
6. "Oye Como Va" (Tito Puente)
7. "Japan" (Hayashi, Matsuhima; arr.: Santana, Kermode, Shrieve, Rauch, Coster, Peraza, Areas)
8. "Bambele" (Areas, Peraza)
9. "Um Um Um" (Leon Thomas)
10. "Yours Is the Light" (Kermode)
11. "Batukada" (Santana, Coster, Kermode, Rauch, Shrieve, Areas, Peraza)
12. "Xibaba (She-Ba-Ba)" (Moreira)
13. "Stone Flower (Introduction)" (Jobim)
14. "Waiting" (Santana)
15. "Castillos de Arena Part 1 (Sand Castle)" (Young, Santana, Coster, Kermode, Rauch, Shrieve, Areas, Peraza, Corea)
16. "Free Angela" (Cochran)
17. "Samba de Sausalito" (Areas)
18. "Mantra" (Coster, Santana, Shrieve)
19. "Kyoto" (Shrieve)
20. "Castillos de Arena Part 2 (Sand Castle)" (Corea, Young, Santana, Coster, Kermode, Rauch, Shrieve, Areas, Peraza)
21. "Light of Life" (Santana, Kermode, Coster)
22. "Se Acabó" (Areas)
23. "Samba Pa Ti" (Santana)
24. "Mr. Udo" (Santana, Coster, Kermode, Rauch, Shrieve, Areas, Peraza)
25. "The Creator Has a Master Plan" (Thomas, Pharoah Sanders)
26. "Savor" (Areas, Brown, Carabello, Rolie, Santana, Shrieve)
27. "Conga Solo" (Peraza)
28. "Toussaint L'Ouverture" (Areas, Brown, Carabello, Rolie, Santana, Shrieve)
29. "Incident at Neshabur" (Gianquinto, Santana)

=== July–August 1973: Oceanic tour ===
The group's first tour of Oceania lasted from July 23, 1973 at Brisbane Festival Hall in Brisbane, Australia to August 8, 1973 at Christchurch Town Hall in Christchurch, New Zealand. No set list information exists of this leg, but the set lists were reportedly similar to the previous ones.

=== August–October 1973: Third North American tour ===
The band did another North American tour from August 12, 1973 at Roosevelt Stadium in Jersey City, New Jersey to October 3, 1973 at Estadio Nacional Somoza in Managua, Nicaragua. Mexican television crews taped the shows at the Auditorio de la Reforma in Puebla, Mexico on September 22–23, 1973. Here is a typical set list for this leg (actual set list taken from the August 12 Jersey City show):

1. "Going Home" (Dvorák; arr.: Coltrane, Santana, Coster, Kermode, Rauch, Shrieve, Areas, Peraza)
2. "A-1 Funk" (Santana, Coster, Kermode, Rauch, Shrieve, Areas, Peraza)
3. "Every Step of the Way" (Shrieve)
4. "Black Magic Woman" (Green)
5. "Gypsy Queen" (Szabó)
6. "Oye Como Va" (Puente)
7. "Japan" (Hayashi, Matsuhima; arr.: Santana, Kermode, Shrieve, Rauch, Coster, Peraza, Areas)
8. "Bambele" (Areas, Peraza)
9. "Um Um Um" (Thomas)
10. "Yours Is the Light" (Kermode)
11. "Batukada" (Santana, Coster, Kermode, Rauch, Shrieve, Areas, Peraza)
12. "Xibaba (She-Ba-Ba)" (Moreira)
13. "Stone Flower (Introduction)" (Jobim)
14. "Waiting" (Santana)
15. "Castillos de Arena Part 1 (Sand Castle)" (Young, Santana, Coster, Kermode, Rauch, Shrieve, Areas, Peraza, Corea)
16. "Free Angela" (Cochran)
17. "Samba de Sausalito" (Areas)
18. "Castillos de Arena Part 2 (Sand Castle)" (Corea, Young, Santana, Coster, Kermode, Rauch, Shrieve, Areas, Peraza)
19. "Light of Life" (Santana, Kermode, Coster)
20. "Se Acabó" (Areas)
21. "Mr. Udo" (Santana, Coster, Kermode, Rauch, Shrieve, Areas, Peraza)
22. "The Creator Has a Master Plan" (Thomas, Sanders)
23. "Savor" (Areas, Brown, Carabello, Rolie, Santana, Shrieve)
24. "Toussaint L'Ouverture" (Areas, Brown, Carabello, Rolie, Santana, Shrieve)
25. "Samba Pa Ti" (Santana)
26. "Incident at Neshabur" (Gianquinto, Santana)

=== October 1973: Tour of South America ===
A series of shows in South America began on October 5, 1973 at Plaza de toros Monumental de Maracaibo in Maracaibo, Venezuela and ended on October 21, 1973 at Ginasio Municipal Novo in Brasília, Brazil. Here is a typical set list for this leg (actual set list taken from the October 19 São Paulo show):

1. "Going Home" (Dvorák; arr.: Coltrane, Santana, Coster, Kermode, Rauch, Shrieve, Areas, Peraza)
2. "A-1 Funk" (Santana, Coster, Kermode, Rauch, Shrieve, Areas, Peraza)
3. "Every Step of the Way" (Shrieve)
4. "Black Magic Woman" (Green)
5. "Gypsy Queen" (Szabó)
6. "Oye Como Va" (Puente)
7. "Bambele" (Areas, Peraza)
8. "Um Um Um" (Thomas)
9. "Yours Is the Light" (Kermode)
10. "Batukada" (Santana, Coster, Kermode, Rauch, Shrieve, Areas, Peraza)
11. "Xibaba (She-Ba-Ba)" (Moreira)
12. "Stone Flower (Introduction)" (Jobim)
13. "Waiting" (Santana)
14. "Castillos de Arena Part 1 (Sand Castle)" (Young, Santana, Coster, Kermode, Rauch, Shrieve, Areas, Peraza, Corea)
15. "Free Angela" (Cochran)
16. Concierto de Aranjuez (Rodrigo)
17. "Samba de Sausalito" (Areas)
18. "Castillos de Arena Part 2 (Sand Castle)" (Corea, Young, Santana, Coster, Kermode, Rauch, Shrieve, Areas, Peraza)
19. "Se Acabó" (Areas)
20. "Samba Pa Ti" (Santana)
21. "Savor" (Areas, Brown, Carabello, Rolie, Santana, Shrieve)
22. "Toussaint L'Ouverture" (Areas, Brown, Carabello, Rolie, Santana, Shrieve)

== Live releases ==
Live material from this tour has appeared on the following releases:

- The shows on July 3 and 4, 1973 at the Osaka Kōsei Nenkin Kaikan in Osaka, Japan were released as the triple vinyl LP Lotus.
- Fragments of shows from the Central and South American concerts of this tour were used in the 1973 concert film Santana en Colores.
- "Samba Pa Ti" from Santana en Colores, filmed on September 28, 1973 at Gimnasio Nacional José Adolfo Pineda in San Salvador, El Salvador was released on the video Viva Santana! An Intimate Conversation With Carlos Santana in 1988.

== Reception ==
During the band's first North American tour in 1972, it was reported that "the crowds were sparer than expected in a few spots than the last tour, but there were standing ovations in San Francisco and New York, and encores almost everywhere else." However, in a review for The Stanford Daily, reporter Don Tollefson gave their performance at San Francisco's Winterland Ballroom on April 6, 1973 a poor review, saying that the talent of the members was underutilized, and one of the other acts on the bill, Focus, delivered a better performance than headliner Santana. Additionally, the band's shows in Venezuela and Colombia were negatively received by the media.

== Tour dates ==
=== North American leg (September 4 – October 30, 1972) ===
List of tour dates with date, city, country, venue
Date	City	Country	Venue
September 4, 1972 (Note: The concert on September 4, 1972 was a part of the Erie Canal Soda Pop Festival.)	Griffin	United States	Bull Island
September 12, 1972	Berkeley	United States	Keystone Berkeley
October 4, 1972	San Francisco	United States	Winterland Ballroom
October 5, 1972	San Francisco	United States	Winterland Ballroom
October 6, 1972	San Francisco	United States	Winterland Ballroom
October 7, 1972	Bakersfield	United States	Bakersfield Civic Auditorium
October 8, 1972	Long Beach	United States	Long Beach Arena
October 9, 1972	Los Angeles	United States	Hollywood Palladium
October 11, 1972	Spokane	United States	Spokane Coliseum
October 12, 1972	Edmonton	Canada	Edmonton Gardens
October 13, 1972	Calgary	Canada	Southern Alberta Jubilee Auditorium
October 15, 1972	Seattle	United States	Hec Edmundson Pavilion
October 26, 1972	Uniondale	United States	Nassau Veterans Memorial Coliseum
October 28, 1972	Cherry Hill	United States	Cherry Hill Arena
October 29, 1972	Boston	United States	Music Hall
October 30, 1972	New York City	United States	Academy of Music

=== European leg (November 4 – December 5, 1972) ===
List of tour dates with date, city, country, venue
Date	City	Country	Venue
November 4, 1972 (2 shows)	London	England	Empire Pool
November 6, 1972	Munich	West Germany	Circus Krone Building
November 7, 1972	Münster	West Germany	Halle Münsterland
November 8, 1972	Hamburg	West Germany	Musikhalle Hamburg
November 9, 1972	West Berlin	West Germany	Deutschlandhalle
November 11, 1972	Frankfurt	West Germany	Festhalle Messe Frankfurt
November 12, 1972	Freiburg im Breisgau	West Germany	Stadthalle Freiburg
November 15, 1972	Copenhagen	Denmark	Falkoner Teatret
November 16, 1972	Lund	Sweden	Akademiska Föreningens Stora Sal
November 17, 1972	Gothenburg	Sweden	Scandinavium
November 18, 1972	Stockholm	Sweden	Kungliga tennishallen
November 21, 1972 (2 shows)	Manchester	England	The Hardrock Concert Theatre
November 22, 1972 (2 shows)	Newcastle upon Tyne	England	Newcastle City Hall
November 23, 1972 (Note: The band performed in Bournemouth, England on November 23 or 24, 1972.)	Bournemouth	England	—N/a
November 24, 1972	Bournemouth	England	—N/a
November 25, 1972 (Note: The concert on November 25, 1972 was a part of Super Pop.)	Montreux	Switzerland	Pavillon Montreux
November 28, 1972	Lyon	France	Palais d'Hiver
December 1, 1972	Rotterdam	Netherlands	Grote Zaal
December 3, 1972 (2 shows)	Amsterdam	Netherlands	Concertgebouw
December 4, 1972 (2 shows)	Paris	France	L'Olympia Bruno Coquatrix
December 5, 1972	Düsseldorf	West Germany	Philips Halle

=== North American leg (December 9, 1972 – June 21, 1973) ===
List of tour dates with date, city, country, venue
Date	City	Country	Venue
December 9, 1972	New Orleans	United States	Loyola Field House
December 10, 1972	Dallas	United States	Dallas Memorial Auditorium
December 12, 1972	San Antonio	United States	San Antonio Municipal Auditorium
December 13, 1972	Lubbock	United States	Lubbock Municipal Coliseum
December 14, 1972	El Paso	United States	El Paso County Coliseum
December 15, 1972	Tucson	United States	Tucson Community Center
December 17, 1972	Honolulu	United States	Honolulu International Center
January 18, 1973 (Note: The concert on January 18, 1973 was a part of the Nicaragua Earthquake Relief Concert.)	Inglewood	United States	The Forum
January 30, 1973	San Diego	United States	San Diego Sports Arena
January 31, 1973	Phoenix	United States	Phoenix Civic Plaza
February 2, 1973	Salt Lake City	United States	Salt Palace
February 3, 1973	Denver	United States	Denver Coliseum
February 6, 1973	Wichita	United States	Henry Levitt Arena
February 7, 1973	Lincoln	United States	Pershing Center
February 8, 1973	Madison	United States	Dane County Coliseum
February 9, 1973	South Bend	United States	Athletic & Convocation Center
February 10, 1973	DeKalb	United States	Chick Evans Field House
February 11, 1973	Kansas City	United States	Municipal Auditorium
February 13, 1973	Athens	United States	Convocation Center
February 14, 1973	St. Louis	United States	St. Louis Arena
February 15, 1973	Kent	United States	Memorial Gym
February 16, 1973	Chicago	United States	International Amphitheatre
February 17, 1973	Columbus	United States	St. John Arena
February 19, 1973	Detroit	United States	Cobo Arena
February 20, 1973	Toronto	Canada	Maple Leaf Gardens
February 21, 1973	Montreal	Canada	Montreal Forum
February 22, 1973	Utica	United States	Utica Memorial Auditorium
February 24, 1973 (2 shows)	Waterbury	United States	Palace Theater
February 25, 1973	Baltimore	United States	Baltimore Civic Center
February 26, 1973	Philadelphia	United States	Spectrum
February 27, 1973	Springfield	United States	Springfield Civic Center
March 5, 1973	Greensboro	United States	Greensboro Memorial Coliseum
March 6, 1973	Knoxville	United States	General James White Memorial Civic Coliseum
March 7, 1973	Charlotte	United States	Charlotte Coliseum
March 8, 1973	Columbia	United States	Carolina Coliseum
March 9, 1973	Hampton	United States	Hampton Roads Coliseum
March 10, 1973	Richmond	United States	Richmond Coliseum
March 11, 1973	Atlanta	United States	Omni Coliseum
March 14, 1973	Cincinnati	United States	Cincinnati Gardens
March 15, 1973	Louisville	United States	Louisville Convention Center
March 16, 1973	Fort Wayne	United States	Allen County War Memorial Coliseum
March 17, 1973	Toledo	United States	Toledo Sports Arena
March 19, 1973	Bloomington	United States	Metropolitan Sports Center
March 21, 1973	Memphis	United States	Mid-South Coliseum
March 23, 1973	Miami Beach	United States	Convention Hall
March 24, 1973	Tampa	United States	Tampa Stadium
March 25, 1973	Macon	United States	Macon Coliseum
March 26, 1973	Jackson	United States	Mississippi Coliseum
March 27, 1973	Little Rock	United States	Barton Coliseum
March 28, 1973	Shreveport	United States	Hirsch Memorial Coliseum
March 29, 1973	Tuscaloosa	United States	Bryant Conference Center
March 30, 1973	Columbus	United States	Municipal Auditorium
April 2, 1973	Houston	United States	Hofheinz Pavilion
April 4, 1973	Albuquerque	United States	University Arena
April 6, 1973	San Francisco	United States	Winterland Ballroom
April 8, 1973	Berkeley	United States	Berkeley Community Theatre
June 21, 1973	Anchorage	United States	Anchorage Sports Arena

=== Asian leg (June 27 – July 19, 1973) ===
List of tour dates with date, city, country, venue
Date	City	Country	Venue
June 27, 1973	Fukuoka	Japan	Fukuoka Kyuden Kinen Gymnasium
June 28, 1973	Hiroshima	Japan	Yubin Chokin Hall
June 30, 1973	Nagoya	Japan	Nagoya Civic Assembly Hall
July 1, 1973	Nagoya	Japan	Nagoya Civic Assembly Hall
July 2, 1973	Osaka	Japan	Osaka Kōsei Nenkin Kaikan
July 3, 1973	Osaka	Japan	Osaka Kōsei Nenkin Kaikan
July 4, 1973	Osaka	Japan	Osaka Kōsei Nenkin Kaikan
July 5, 1973	Kyoto	Japan	Kyoto Kaikan
July 6, 1973	Tokyo	Japan	Nippon Budokan
July 7, 1973	Tokyo	Japan	Nippon Budokan
July 10, 1973	Sapporo	Japan	Hokkaido Kōsei Nenkin Kaikan
July 11, 1973	Sapporo	Japan	Hokkaido Kōsei Nenkin Kaikan
July 15, 1973	Causeway Bay	Hong Kong	Lee Theatre
July 16, 1973	Causeway Bay	Hong Kong	Lee Theatre
~~July 18, 1973~~	~~Jakarta~~	~~Indonesia~~	—N/a
July 19, 1973	Kuala Lumpur	Malaysia	Stadium Negara Malaysia

=== Australasian leg (July 23 – August 8, 1973) ===
List of tour dates with date, city, country, venue
Date	City	Country	Venue
July 23, 1973	Brisbane	Australia	Brisbane Festival Hall
July 25, 1973	Sydney	Australia	Hordern Pavilion
July 26, 1973	Sydney	Australia	Hordern Pavilion
July 28, 1973	Adelaide	Australia	Apollo Stadium
July 29, 1973	Adelaide	Australia	Apollo Stadium
July 30, 1973	Perth	Australia	Beatty Park Aquatic Centre
July 31, 1973	Perth	Australia	Beatty Park Aquatic Centre
August 2, 1973	Melbourne	Australia	Festival Hall
August 3, 1973	Melbourne	Australia	Festival Hall
August 5, 1973	Sydney	Australia	Hordern Pavilion
August 7, 1973	Auckland	New Zealand	Civic Theatre
August 8, 1973	Christchurch	New Zealand	Christchurch Town Hall

=== North American leg (August 12 – October 3, 1973) ===
List of tour dates with date, city, country, venue
Date	City	Country	Venue
August 12, 1973 (Note: The concert on August 12, 1973 was a part of the Garden State Summer Music Fair.)	Jersey City	United States	Roosevelt Stadium
August 15, 1973	Providence	United States	Providence Civic Center
August 16, 1973	Columbia	United States	Merriweather Post Pavilion
August 17, 1973	Hartford	United States	Dillon Stadium
August 18, 1973 (Note: The concert on August 18, 1973 was a part of the Peachtree Celebration.)	Fayetteville	United States	Jaycee Fairgrounds
August 19, 1973	Philadelphia	United States	Philadelphia Convention Hall and Civic Center
September 21, 1973	Guadalajara	Mexico	—N/a
September 22, 1973	Puebla	Mexico	Auditorio de la Reforma
September 23, 1973	Puebla	Mexico	Auditorio de la Reforma
September 24, 1973	Mexico City	Mexico	Teatro de los Insurgentes
September 26, 1973	Guatemala City	Guatemala	Estadio Nacional Mateo Flores
September 28, 1973 (2 shows)	San Salvador	El Salvador	Gimnasio Nacional José Adolfo Pineda
September 29, 1973	San José	Costa Rica	Gimnasio Nacional Eddy Cortés
September 30, 1973	Panama City	Panama	Estadio Revolución
October 3, 1973	Managua	Nicaragua	Estadio Nacional Somoza

=== South American leg (October 5–21, 1973) ===
List of tour dates with date, city, country, venue
Date	City	Country	Venue
October 5, 1973	Maracaibo	Venezuela	Plaza de toros Monumental de Maracaibo
October 6, 1973	Valencia	Venezuela	Plaza de toros Monumental de Valencia
October 7, 1973	Caracas	Venezuela	Estadio Universitario de Caracas
October 9, 1973	Bogotá	Colombia	Coliseo Cubierto El Campín
October 11, 1973	Cali	Colombia	Coliseo El Pueblo
October 14, 1973	Buenos Aires	Argentina	Teatro Metro
October 15, 1973	Buenos Aires	Argentina	Estadio Luna Park
October 16, 1973	Buenos Aires	Argentina	Estadio Gasómetro
October 18, 1973	Porto Alegre	Brazil	Ginásio do Gremio Portoalegrense
October 19, 1973	São Paulo	Brazil	Ginásio Estadual Geraldo José de Almeida
October 20, 1973	Rio de Janeiro	Brazil	Ginásio Gilberto Cardoso
October 21, 1973	Brasília	Brazil	Ginasio Municipal Novo

=== Unknown dates ===
List of tour dates with date, city, country, venue
Date	City	Country	Venue
1972	San Francisco	United States	The Boarding House
