= Welcome Tour =

1973–74 concert tour by Santana

- Tour by Santana
- Poster to the concert in Vienna, Austria
- Associated album: Welcome
- Start date: November 13, 1973
- End date: October 29, 1974
- Legs: 2
- No. of shows: 61 in North America; 28 in Europe; 89 in total

Santana concert chronology
- Caravanserai Tour (1972–73); Welcome Tour (1973–74); Borboletta Tour (1974–75)

The Welcome Tour was a concert tour by Santana promoting their album, Welcome. The tour began on November 13, 1973 at Colston Hall in Bristol, England and ended on October 29, 1974 at the William P. Cole, Jr. Student Activities Building in College Park, Maryland.

== History ==
After releasing their new album Welcome on November 9, 1973, the band went on tour in North America and Europe to promote the release. The band started the tour with a European tour, starting on November 13, 1973 in England. The tour was scheduled to have two shows in Yugoslavia, but the band was denied entry into the country. Following the European tour, the band ended 1973 with a New Year's Eve show at the Winterland Ballroom in San Francisco. In 1974, the band started a North American tour. After finishing a short tour with British guitarist John McLaughlin, Carlos Santana assembled a new lineup of the band. The group added saxophonist Jules Broussard and singer/keyboardist Leon Patillo. Drummer Michael Shrieve left due to health problems and he ended up getting replaced by Leon "Ndugu" Chancler for a short period. Doug Rauch quit the band and David Brown, who had played with Santana from 1966 to 1971, followed in his footsteps.

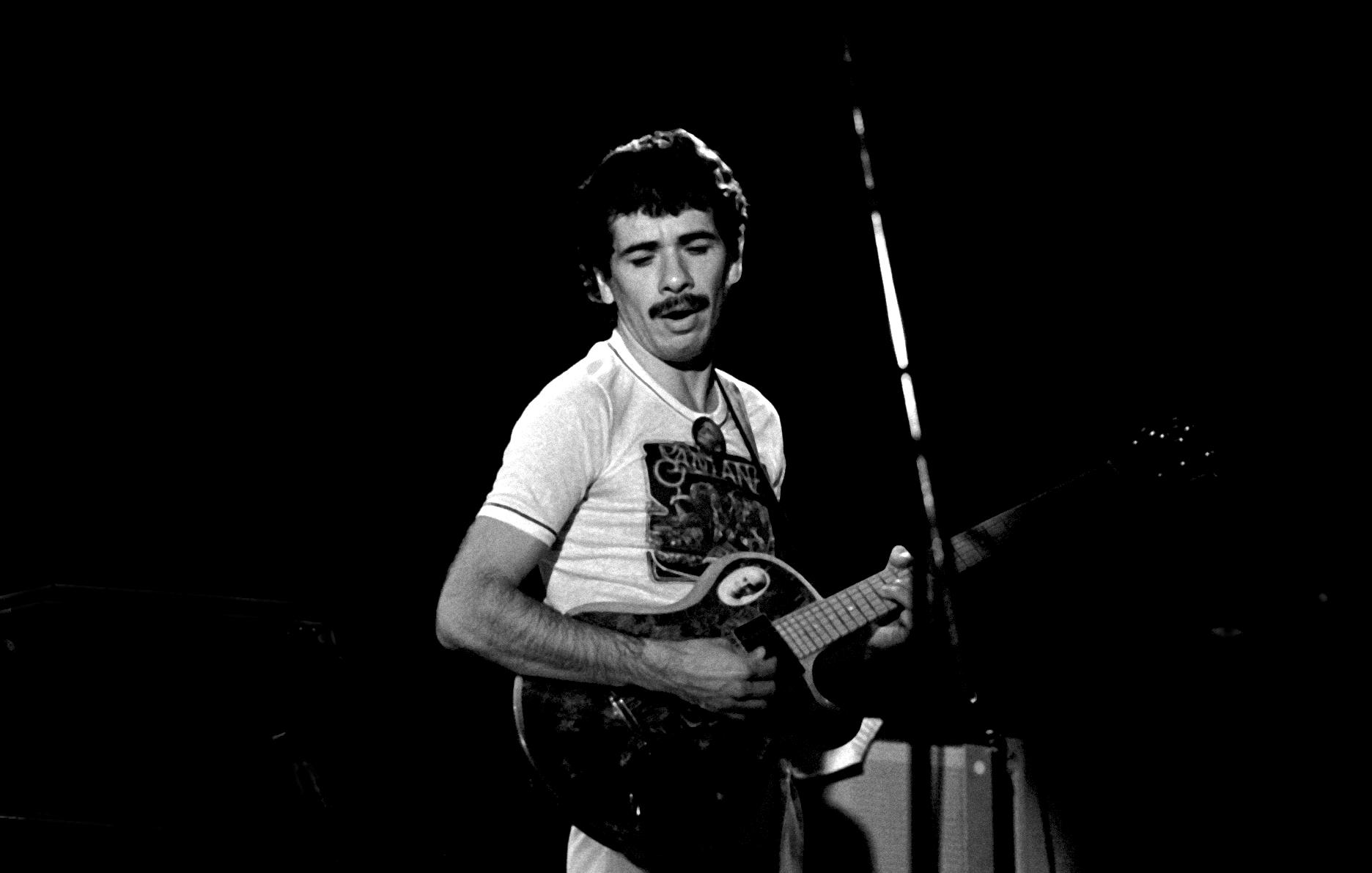
Carlos Santana performing at Congress Centrum Hamburg in Hamburg, West Germany on November 26, 1973

The set lists of this tour were similar to the set lists of their previous tour, the difference being the addition of "Mirage" and "Give and Take", months before their release on Borboletta and the removal of certain songs from the last tour.

One of the largest crowds Santana performed to during this tour was an appearance at the World Series of Rock festival in Cleveland's Cleveland Stadium on August 31, before a crowd of around 88,000 people. Another large crowd Santana performed to was at the First Annual Barndance and Bar B. Q. in Austin, Texas, playing to a crowd of at least 80,000 people. The band sometimes opened for other artists during this tour such as Crosby, Stills, Nash & Young.

== Reception ==
A show on October 11, 1974 was given a positive review by Billboard.

== Live releases ==
Live material from this tour has appeared on the following releases:

- "Bambele" from December 31, 1973 at the Winterland Ballroom in San Francisco, California was released on the 1988 compilation album Viva Santana!.

=== Recordings ===
No songs from 1974 have been officially released on an album. The concerts on July 28 and September 14 were broadcast on American radio, but only the July concert has surfaced.

== Tour band ==
- Leon Patillo – lead vocals, piano, organ
- Carlos Santana – electric guitar, Echoplex, Latin percussion, vocals
- Tom Coster – Yamaha organ, Hammond organ, electric piano, electric organ, vocals
- David Brown – bass guitar
- Jules Broussard – saxophone, flute
- Michael Shrieve – drums (through an unknown date)
- Leon "Ndugu" Chancler – drums (beginning on an unknown date)
- José ”Chepito” Areas – timbales, congas, percussion, vocals
- Armando Peraza – congas, percussion

== Typical set lists ==
European tour (November–December 1973)
1. "Going Home" (Dvorák; arr.: Coltrane, Santana, Coster, Kermode, Rauch, Shrieve, Areas, Peraza)
2. "A-1 Funk" (Santana, Coster, Kermode, Rauch, Shrieve, Areas, Peraza)
3. "Every Step of the Way" (Shrieve)
4. "Black Magic Woman" (Green)
5. "Gypsy Queen" (Szabó)
6. "Oye Como Va" (Puente)
7. "Just in Time to See the Sun" (Rolie, Santana, Shrieve)
8. "Bambele" (Areas, Peraza)
9. "Um Um Um" (Thomas)
10. "Batukada" (Santana, Coster, Kermode, Rauch, Shrieve, Areas, Peraza)
11. "Xibaba (She-Ba-Ba)" (Moreira)
12. "Stone Flower (Introduction)" (Jobim)
13. "Waiting" (Santana)
14. "Castillos de Arena Part 1 (Sand Castle)" (Young, Santana, Coster, Kermode, Rauch, Shrieve, Areas, Peraza, Corea)
15. "Flor de Canela" (Carlos Santana, Doug Rauch)
16. "Free Angela" (Cochran)
17. Concierto de Aranjuez (Rodrigo)
18. "Samba de Sausalito" (Areas)
19. "Castillos de Arena Part 2 (Sand Castle)" (Corea, Young, Santana, Coster, Kermode, Rauch, Shrieve, Areas, Peraza)
20. "When I Look into Your Eyes" (Shrieve, Coster)
21. "Se Acabó" (Areas)
22. "Savor" (Areas, Brown, Carabello, Rolie, Santana, Shrieve)
23. "Toussaint L'Ouverture" (Areas, Brown, Carabello, Rolie, Santana, Shrieve)
24. "Samba Pa Ti" (Santana)
North American tour (December 1973–October 1974)
1. "Going Home" (Anton Dvorák; arranged by Alice Coltrane, Carlos Santana, Tom Coster, Richard Kermode, Doug Rauch, Michael Shrieve, José Areas, Armando Peraza)
2. "A-1 Funk" (Santana, Coster, Kermode, Rauch, Shrieve, Areas, Peraza)
3. "Every Step of the Way" (Shrieve)
4. "Black Magic Woman" (Peter Green)
5. "Gypsy Queen" (Gábor Szabó)
6. "Oye Como Va" (Tito Puente)
7. "Mirage" (Leon Patillo)
8. "Just in Time to See the Sun" (Gregg Rolie, Santana, Shrieve)
9. "Bambele" (Areas, Peraza)
10. "Give and Take" (Santana, Coster, Shrieve)
11. "Incident at Neshabur" (Alberto Gianquinto, Santana)
12. "Soul Sacrifice" (Santana, Rolie, David Brown, Marcus Malone)
13. "Samba Pa Ti" (Santana)
14. "Savor" (Areas, Brown, Carabello, Rolie, Santana, Shrieve)
15. "Toussaint L'Ouverture" (Areas, Brown, Carabello, Rolie, Santana, Shrieve)

== Tour dates ==
=== European leg (November 13 – December 12, 1973) ===
List of tour dates with date, city, country, venue
Date	City	Country	Venue
November 13, 1973	Bristol	England	Colston Hall
November 14, 1973 (2 shows)	London	England	Rainbow Theatre
November 15, 1973 (2 shows)	London	England	Rainbow Theatre
November 16, 1973 (2 shows)	Birmingham	England	Birmingham Odeon
November 17, 1973	London	England	Empire Pool
November 18, 1973 (2 shows)	Manchester	England	The Hardrock Concert Theatre
November 20, 1973	Düsseldorf	West Germany	Philips Halle
November 22, 1973	Offenburg	West Germany	Oberrheinhalle
November 23, 1973	Böblingen	West Germany	Sporthalle
November 25, 1973	Frankfurt	West Germany	Festhalle Messe Frankfurt
November 26, 1973	Hamburg	West Germany	Congress Centrum Hamburg
November 27, 1973	West Berlin	West Germany	Deutschlandhalle
November 26, 1973	Brussels	Belgium	Forest National
November 30, 1973	Vienna	Austria	Wiener Stadthalle
December 3, 1973	Turin	Italy	Palasport di Torino
December 5, 1973 (2 shows)	Barcelona	Spain	Palacio Municipal de Deportes
December 6, 1973 (2 shows)	Madrid	Spain	Teatro Monumental
December 8, 1973	Rotterdam	Netherlands	Sportpaleis
December 9, 1973 (2 shows)	Zürich	Switzerland	Tonhalle
December 12, 1973	Rome	Italy	Palazzo dello Sport

=== North American leg (December 31, 1973 – October 29, 1974) ===
List of tour dates with date, city, country, venue
Date	City	Country	Venue
December 31, 1973	San Francisco	United States	Winterland Ballroom
January 14, 1974	Ithaca	United States	Barton Hall
July 13, 1974	Allendale Charter Township	United States	G.V.S.C. Fieldhouse
July 22, 1974	Edmonton	Canada	Kinsmen Field House
July 24, 1974	Vancouver	Canada	Pacific Coliseum
July 25, 1974	Seattle	United States	Paramount Theatre
July 26, 1974	Portland	United States	Paramount Theatre
July 28, 1974	San Diego	United States	Balboa Stadium
July 31, 1974 (Note: The concert on July 31 was a part of the CBS Convention.)	Los Angeles	United States	The Century Plaza Hotel
August 2, 1974	Santa Barbara	United States	Robertson Gymnasium
August 4, 1974	Milwaukee	United States	Henry Maier Festival Park
August 6, 1974	Clear Lake	United States	Surf Ballroom
August 7, 1974	Green Bay	United States	Brown County Veterans Memorial Arena
August 9, 1974	Mays Landing	United States	Atlantic City Race Course
August 10, 1974	Clarkston	United States	Pine Knob Music Theatre
August 11, 1974 (Note: The band opened for Crosby, Stills, Nash & Young on August 11.)	Orchard Park	United States	Rich Stadium
August 14, 1974	Winnipeg	Canada	Winnipeg Arena
August 16, 1974	Allendale Charter Township	United States	G.V.S.C. Fieldhouse
August 17, 1974	Saint Paul	United States	Saint Paul Civic Center
August 18, 1974	Milwaukee	United States	MECCA Auditorium
August 31, 1974 (Note: The concert on August 31 was a part of the World Series of Rock.)	Cleveland	United States	Cleveland Stadium
September 1, 1974 (Note: The concert on September 1 was a part of ZZ Top's First Annual Barndance and Bar B. Q.)	Austin	United States	Memorial Stadium
September 13, 1974	San Francisco	United States	Winterland Ballroom
September 14, 1974	San Francisco	United States	Winterland Ballroom
September 15, 1974	Fresno	United States	Selland Arena
September 17, 1974	Phoenix	United States	Celebrity Theatre
September 18, 1974	Las Vegas	United States	International Ice Palace
September 20, 1974	San Bernardino	United States	Swing Auditorium
September 21, 1974	Bakersfield	United States	Bakersfield Civic Auditorium
September 23, 1974	Albuquerque	United States	University Stadium
September 24, 1974	Las Cruces	United States	Pan American Center
September 26, 1974	Tulsa	United States	Tulsa Assembly Center
September 27, 1974	Oklahoma City	United States	All Sports Stadium
September 28, 1974	Houston	United States	Sam Houston Coliseum
September 29, 1974	Shreveport	United States	Hirsch Memorial Coliseum
October 2, 1974	Atlanta	United States	Omni Coliseum
October 3, 1974	Tampa	United States	Curtis Hixon Hall
October 4, 1974	Orlando	United States	Orlando Sports Stadium
October 5, 1974	Jacksonville	United States	Jacksonville Coliseum
October 6, 1974	Miami	United States	Miami Jai-Alai Fronton
October 9, 1974	Passaic	United States	Capitol Theatre
October 10, 1974	Passaic	United States	Capitol Theatre
October 11, 1974 (2 shows)	New York City	United States	Academy of Music
October 12, 1974 (2 shows)	New York City	United States	Academy of Music
October 13, 1974 (Note: The concert on October 13 was a part of a Sri Chinmoy benefit.)	New York City	United States	Academy of Music
October 14, 1974	Ithaca	United States	Barton Hall
October 15, 1974	New Haven	United States	New Haven Veterans Memorial Coliseum
October 17, 1974	Providence	United States	Providence Civic Center
October 18, 1974	Rochester	United States	The Dome Arena
October 19, 1974	College Park	United States	William P. Cole, Jr. Student Activities Building
October 20, 1974	Boston	United States	Music Hall
October 22, 1974	Erie	United States	Erie County Field House
October 23, 1974	Charleston	United States	Charleston Civic Center
October 24, 1974	Pittsburgh	United States	Civic Arena
October 25, 1974	Chicago	United States	International Amphitheatre
October 26, 1974	Oshkosh	United States	Kolf Sports Center
October 27, 1974	Madison	United States	Dane County Coliseum
October 28, 1974	Milwaukee	United States	MECCA Auditorium
October 29, 1974	College Park	United States	William P. Cole, Jr. Student Activities Building
