= Lotus (Santana album) =

Live album by Santana
- Released: May 1974 (Japan); Nov. 1975 (Europe); June 1991 (U.S.)
- Recorded: July 3 and 4, 1973
- Venues: Osaka Kōsei Nenkin Kaikan, Osaka, Japan
- Genres: Latin rock; jazz fusion; funk rock; rhythm and blues
- Length: 121:08 (original LP); 118:51 (1991 2CD reissue); 156:18 (2017 3CD reissue)
- Label: CBS/Sony
- Producers: Carlos Santana; Richard Kermode; Michael Shrieve; Doug Rauch; Tom Coster; Armando Peraza; José Areas

Santana chronology
Welcome (1973)	Lotus (1974)	Greatest Hits (1974)

Professional ratings
Review scores
Source	Rating
Allmusic	4.5/5 stars

Lotus (Japanese: ロータスの伝説) is a 1974 live album by the Latin rock band Santana, recorded at the Osaka Kōsei Nenkin Kaikan, Osaka, Japan in July 1973, during their Caravanserai Tour. The Welcome album recording sessions were completed shortly before this concert, and that album was later released in November 1973. Lotus was originally released as a triple vinyl LP in Japan only. This version of the album was later released internationally.

In 2017 a limited-edition version was released as Lotus: Complete Edition. This release is a 3 disc set hybrid Super Audio CD with seven previously unreleased bonus tracks. This was also a Japan only release.

== Recording and mixing ==
The 1973 live recordings were mixed in 4-channel quadraphonic sound and released in the CBS Stereo Quadraphonic (SQ) matrix system. The SQ encoding makes it possible to format all 4 channels into a 2 channel stereo version, which is compatible with conventional stereo playback equipment. Some releases of this mix have been marked as "Quadraphonic" or "SQ" and some are not. However, all known releases of Lotus prior to 2017 use the same SQ encoded 2 channel recordings. The 4 channels can still be heard on modern equipment provided that the listener has a proper SQ decoder and 4 channel playback system.

== Release history ==
The complete 3-LP set was not released in Europe until November 1975. The first U.S. release was in June 1991 as a 2-CD set and 2 cassette tape set. It was re-issued again in 2006 on vinyl in the Netherlands and on CD in Japan as a 3-CD set. It was also re-issued in the US in 2013 as a 3-LP set. This version was also released in 2016 in the United States by Audio Fidelity as a 2-Super Audio CD set.

== 2017 "Complete" Edition ==
In 2017, Lotus: Complete Edition was released in Japan as a 3 disc set hybrid Super Audio CD including seven bonus tracks inserted between the original tracks. In addition to 4.0 surround sound audio there are stereo SACD tracks as well as a stereo CD layer which can be played on conventional CD players.

== Album Cover Design ==
The album’s elaborate packaging was designed by Japanese artist Tadanori Yokoo and is noted for holding the record for the most facings on a gatefold vinyl LP- a total of 22 panels. Released by CBS/Sony to commemorate Santana’s Tour of Japan in 1973, the live recording captures the concert held on 3 July 1973 at the Kosei Nenkin Kaikan in Osaka, Japan. All 22 illustrated panels were created by Yokoo, and the production of the packaging reportedly cost approximately £30,000 to manufacture.

== Track listing ==
=== Vinyl ===
Side one
No.	Title	Writer(s)	Length
1.	"Meditation" (from Love Devotion Surrender)	John McLaughlin	1:40
2.	"Going Home" (from Welcome)	Alice Coltrane, Carlos Santana, Tom Coster, Richard Kermode, Doug Rauch, Michael Shrieve, José Areas, Armando Peraza	2:53
3.	"A-1 Funk" (new track)	Santana, Coster, Kermode, Rauch, Shrieve, Areas, Peraza	3:13
4.	"Every Step of the Way" (from Caravanserai)	Shrieve	11:30

Side two
No.	Title	Writer(s)	Length
5.	"Black Magic Woman" (from Abraxas)	Peter Green	3:38
6.	"Gypsy Queen" (from Abraxas)	Gábor Szabó	3:58
7.	"Oye Como Va" (from Abraxas)	Tito Puente	5:47
8.	"Yours Is the Light" (from Welcome)	Kermode	5:30
9.	"Batukada" (new track)	Santana, Coster, Kermode, Rauch, Shrieve, Areas, Peraza	0:55
10.	"Xibaba (She-Ba-Ba)" (new track)	Airto Moreira	4:13

Side three
No.	Title	Writer(s)	Length
11.	"Stone Flower (Introduction)" (from Caravanserai)	Antônio Carlos Jobim	1:14
12.	"Waiting" (from Santana)	Santana, Rollie, Brown, Shrieve, Carabello, Areas	4:14
13.	"Castillos de Arena Part 1 (Sand Castle)" (new track)	Joaquim Young, Santana, Coster, Kermode, Rauch, Shrieve, Areas, Peraza, Chick Corea	2:51
14.	"Free Angela" (new track)	Todd Cochran	4:26
15.	"Samba de Sausalito" (from Welcome)	Areas	4:02

Side four
No.	Title	Writer(s)	Length
16.	"Mantra" (from Welcome)	Coster, Santana, Shrieve	7:17
17.	"Kyoto (Drum Solo)" (new track)	Shrieve	9:58
18.	"Castillos de Arena Part 2 (Sand Castle)" (new track)	Corea, Young, Santana, Coster, Kermode, Rauch, Shrieve, Areas, Peraza	1:13
19.	"Se a Cabo" (from Abraxas)	Areas	5:39

Side five
No.	Title	Writer(s)	Length
20.	"Samba Pa Ti" (from Abraxas)	Santana	8:56
21.	"Savor" (from Santana)	Areas, Brown, Carabello, Rolie, Santana, Shrieve	3:06
22.	"Toussaint L'Overture" (from Santana III)	Areas, Brown, Carabello, Rolie, Santana, Shrieve	7:40

Side six
No.	Title	Writer(s)	Length
23.	"Incident at Neshabur" (from Abraxas)	Santana, Alberto Gianquinto	17:15
Total length:			121:08

=== 1991 CD reissue ===
Disc one
No.	Title	Writer(s)	Length
1.	"Going Home" (from Welcome)	Coltrane, Santana, Coster, Kermode, Rauch, Shrieve, Areas, Peraza	3:33
2.	"A-1 Funk" (new track)	Santana, Coster, Kermode, Rauch, Shrieve, Areas, Peraza	3:13
3.	"Every Step of the Way" (from Caravanserai)	Shrieve	11:30
4.	"Black Magic Woman" (from Abraxas)	Green	3:38
5.	"Gypsy Queen" (from Abraxas)	Szabó	3:58
6.	"Oye Como Va" (from Abraxas)	Puente	5:47
7.	"Yours Is the Light" (from Welcome)	Kermode	5:30
8.	"Batuka" (from Santana III)	Areas, Brown, Carabello, Rolie, Shrieve	0:55
9.	"Xibaba (She-Ba-Ba)" (new track)	Moreira	4:13
10.	"Stone Flower (Introduction)" (from Caravanserai)	Jobim, Santana, Shrieve	1:14
11.	"Waiting" (from Santana)	Santana	4:14
12.	"Castillos de Arena Part 1 (Sand Castle)" (new track)	Corea, Young, Santana, Coster, Kermode, Rauch, Shrieve, Areas, Peraza	2:51
13.	"Free Angela" (new track)	Cochran	4:26
14.	"Samba de Sausalito" (from Welcome)	Areas	4:02

Disc two
No.	Title	Writer(s)	Length
15.	"Mantra" (new track)	Coster, Santana, Shrieve	7:17
16.	"Kyoto (Drum Solo)" (new track)	Shrieve	9:58
17.	"Castillos de Arena Part 2 (Sand Castle)" (new track)	Corea, Young, Santana, Coster, Kermode, Rauch, Shrieve, Areas, Peraza	1:13
18.	"Incident at Neshabur" (from Abraxas)	Gianquinto, Santana	15:57
19.	"Se a Cabo" (from Abraxas)	Areas	5:39
20.	"Samba Pa Ti" (from Abraxas)	Santana	8:56
21.	"Mr. Udo" (re-titled from "Savor")	Santana, Coster, Kermode, Rauch, Shrieve, Areas, Peraza	3:07
22.	"Toussaint L'Overture" (from Santana III)	Areas, Brown, Carabello, Rolie, Santana, Shrieve	7:40

=== Japanese 3-CD ===
The same track listing as the original vinyl release (two sides per CD), except "Mr. Udo" in place of "Savor".

=== 2017 Japanese 3-SACD ===
Disc one
No.	Title	Writer(s)	Length
1.	"Meditation"		1:39
2.	"Going Home" (from Welcome)	Anton Dvorák; arranged by Coltrane, Santana, Coster, Kermode, Rauch, Shrieve, Areas, Peraza	2:53
3.	"A-1 Funk" (new track)	Santana, Coster, Kermode, Rauch, Shrieve, Areas, Peraza	3:13
4.	"Every Step of the Way" (from Caravanserai)	Shrieve	11:30
5.	"Black Magic Woman" (from Abraxas)	Green	3:38
6.	"Gypsy Queen" (from Abraxas)	Szabó	3:58
7.	"Oye Como Va" (from Abraxas)	Puente	5:47
8.	"Japan" (previously unreleased bonus track)	Hayashi, Matsuhima; arranged by Santana, Kermode, Shrieve, Rauch, Coster, Peraza, Areas	4:49
9.	"Bambele" (previously unreleased bonus track)	Areas, Peraza	4:52
10.	"Um Um Um" (previously unreleased bonus track)	Leon Thomas	6:51
11.	"Yours Is the Light" (from Welcome)	Kermode	5:30

Disc two
No.	Title	Writer(s)	Length
12.	"Batuka" (from Santana III)	Areas, Brown, Carabello, Rolie, Shrieve	0:55
13.	"Xibaba (She-Ba-Ba)" (new track)	Moreira	4:13
14.	"Stone Flower (Introduction)" (from Caravanserai)	Jobim, Santana, Shrieve	1:14
15.	"Waiting" (from Santana)	Santana	4:14
16.	"Castillos de Arena Part 1 (Sand Castle)" (new track)	Corea, Young, Santana, Coster, Kermode, Rauch, Shrieve, Areas, Peraza	2:51
17.	"Free Angela" (new track)	Cochran	4:26
18.	"Samba de Sausalito" (from Welcome)	Areas	4:02
19.	"Mantra" (from Welcome)	Coster, Santana, Shrieve	7:17
20.	"Kyoto (Drum Solo)" (new track)	Shrieve	9:58
21.	"Castillos de Arena Part 2 (Sand Castle)" (new track)	Corea, Young, Santana, Kermode, Coster, Kermode, Rauch, Shrieve, Areas, Peraza	2:51
22.	"Light of Life" (previously unreleased bonus track)	Santana, Kermode, Coster	3:29
23.	"Se a Cabo" (from Abraxas)	Areas	5:39

Disc three
No.	Title	Writer(s)	Length
24.	"Samba Pa Ti" (from Abraxas)	Santana	8:56
25.	"Mr. Udo" (new track)	Santana, Coster, Kermode, Rauch, Shrieve, Areas, Peraza	3:07
26.	"The Creator Has a Master Plan" (previously unreleased bonus track)	Thomas, Pharoah Sanders	9:02
27.	"Savor" (previously unreleased bonus track)	Santana, Brown, Rolie, Shrieve, Areas, Carabello	4:15
28.	"Conga Solo" (previously unreleased bonus track)	Peraza	2:45
29.	"Toussaint L'Overture" (from Santana III)	Areas, Brown, Carabello, Rolie, Santana, Shrieve	7:40
30.	"Incident at Neshabur" (from Abraxas)	Gianquinto, Santana	16:22

== Personnel ==
- Carlos Santana – guitar, Latin percussion, Echoplex
- Leon Thomas – maracas, vocals
- Tom Coster – Hammond organ, electric piano, Yamaha organ
- Richard Kermode – Hammond organ, electric piano
- Doug Rauch – bass
- Armando Peraza – congas, bongos, Latin percussion
- José "Chepito" Areas – timbales, congas, Latin percussion
- Michael Shrieve – drums, Latin percussion

== Charts ==
Chart (1974)	Peak position
Australian Albums (Kent Music Report)	49
Dutch Albums (Album Top 100)	15
Italian Albums (Musica e Dischi)	12
Japanese Albums (Oricon)	12
New Zealand Albums (RMNZ)	21

== See also ==
- Agharta (album) – another live album from this time period, also recorded in Osaka, by Miles Davis. Its cover features an Eastern myth-inspired design by Japanese artist Tadanori Yokoo.
