= Big Horn County School District =

Big Horn County School District may refer to the following school districts in Big Horn County, Wyoming (USA):

- Big Horn County School District #1
- Big Horn County School District #2
- Big Horn County School District #3
- Big Horn County School District #4
