= Don G. Despain =

American botanist (1940–2022)

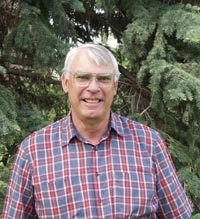
- Born: December 21, 1940; Lovell, Wyoming, US
- Died: May 23, 2022 (aged 81); Billings, Montana, US
- Education: University of Wyoming; Arizona State University; University of Alberta
- Known for: scientific research understanding the place of wildfires in natural ecology
- Scientific career
- Fields: Botany
- Workplaces: Yellowstone National Park

Don Gardner Despain (December 21, 1940 – May 23, 2022) was an American botanist, plant ecologist and fire behavior specialist, who specialized in the flora of Yellowstone National Park, and how wildfires affected natural ecology. He spent over 20 years carefully investigating the effects of the Yellowstone fires of 1988 and how trees such as aspens were affected.

== Biography ==
Despain was born in 1940 in Lovell, Wyoming, the oldest of five children to Daniel Gordon Despain and Lillian Gardner. He attended Lovell High School and then studied at the University of Wyoming, receiving a B.S. in Botany in 1965. He did graduate work at the University of Arizona, receiving an M.S. in plant ecology in 1967, and then a PhD in Plant Ecology from the University of Alberta in Edmonton, Alberta, Canada in 1972. His post-doctoral work was done on Devon Island in the Arctic.

In the mid 1980s, he was the President of the Wyoming Native Plant Society, and Vice-president for the Biological Section at the Montana Academy of Science. From 1998 to 1999, he was vice-president of the scientific research society Sigma Xi from 1998 to 1999, and President from 1999 to 2001.

From 1971 to 2006, he was a research biologist with the National Park Service in Yellowstone National Park, and was instrumental in generating the fire management plans in use by the park since 1972. He generated a vegetation map of the park and did extensive research in fire behavior, fire effects and landscape factors in fire spread, especially how the Yellowstone fires of 1988 affected the regrowth of aspens over the next decades. He also worked as an ecologist with the U.S. Geological Survey, testing the utility of remote sensing systems for vegetation and fuels appraisal.

Despain retired in 2006 to Bozeman, Montana, but continued to stay active in research during his retirement. He died after a long illness on May 23, 2022, in Billings.

== Selected writing ==
Despain wrote extensively on ecology in a variety of academic publications. A few are included below.

=== As D.G. Despain ===
- Field key to the flora of Yellowstone National Park, WY. 1975, Yellowstone National Park: Yellowstone Library and Museum Association.
- Fire as an ecological force in Yellowstone ecosystems (Information paper / Yellowstone National Park)
- Yellowstone vegetation: consequences of environment and history in a natural setting, 1990. Boulder, CO: Roberts Rinehart, Inc.
- Plants and their environments: Proceedings of the first biennial scientific conference on the Greater Yellowstone Ecosystem, 1994. Denver, CO: National Park Service.

=== With co-authors ===
- Mayo, J. M.; Hartgerink, A. P.; Despain, D. G.; Thompson, R. G.; van Zinderen-Bakker, E. M. Jr.; Nelson, S. D. 1977. Gas exchange studies of Carex and Dryas, Truelove Lowland, Devon Island. InIn: Bliss, L. C. Truelove Lowland, Devon Island, Canada: a High Arctic Ecosystem. Edmonton, Alberta, Canada: University of Alberta Press; p265-280.
- Despain, D. G.; Houston, D.; Meagher, M.; Schullery, P. 1986. Wildlife in transition, man and nature on Yellowstone's northern range. Boulder, CO: Roberts Rinehart, Inc.
- Despain, D.; Greenlee, J.; J. Parminter, T.; Sholly T. 1994. A bibliography and directory of the Yellowstone Fires of 1988. Fairfield, Wash: International Association of Wildland Fire.
- Despain, DG; Romme, WH. Historical perspective on the Yellowstone fires of 1988. 1989, BioScience
- Romme, WH; Despain, DG. "The Yellowstone Fires", Scientific American, 1989
