= Caravanserai (album) =

Studio album by Santana
- Released: October 11, 1972
- Recorded: February 21 – May 5, 1972
- Studios: Columbia Studios, San Francisco, California
- Genres: Jazz fusion, Latin rock
- Length: 51:33
- Labels: Columbia, CBS Records International
- Producers: Carlos Santana, Michael Shrieve

Santana chronology
Santana (1971)	Caravanserai (1972)	Welcome (1973)

Carlos Santana chronology
Carlos Santana & Buddy Miles! Live! (1972)	Caravanserai (1972)	Love Devotion Surrender (1973)

Caravanserai is the fourth album by the American rock band Santana, released on October 11, 1972, by Columbia Records and CBS Records International. It was produced by guitarist and bandleader Carlos Santana and drummer Michael Shrieve. The album marked a period of transition for Santana as it was the band's last to feature several key early members, while shifting to a more instrumental jazz rock direction with elements of salsa. It sold in fewer quantities than the band's previous chart-topping albums, stalling at No. 8 on the Billboard album chart, but achieved Platinum status over the years and has been critically acclaimed.

This was the first Santana appearance by Tom Coster who played electric piano on "La Fuente del Ritmo". Coster performed with Santana for years afterward. Once the Caravanserai tour was complete, guitarist Neal Schon and organist/vocalist Gregg Rolie left to co-found the rock band Journey.

== Release and promotion ==
The album was mixed and released in both stereo and quadraphonic. It was released on October 11, 1972. The album was supported with a tour, which spanned the Americas, Europe, Asia, and Oceania and lasted from September 1972 to December 1973. The shows on July 3 and 4, 1973, at the Osaka Kosei Nenkin Kaikan in Osaka, Japan, were released as the triple album Lotus.

The inner cover carried a quote by Paramahansa Yogananda:

The body melts into the universe.
The universe melts into the soundless voice.
The sound melts into the all-shining light.
And the light enters the bosom of infinite joy.

—

In 2000 SME records in Japan, part of Sony Music, released the remastered version as an SACD, in stereo only. In 2022 SME records released the remastered version as an SACD in both stereo and quadraphonic.

The album was remastered in 2003 for re-release on Legacy/Columbia/SME.

== Reception ==
Professional ratings
Review scores
Source	Rating
AllMusic	4.5/5 stars
Christgau's Record Guide	B−
Rolling Stone	(not rated)
The Rolling Stone Album Guide	4/5 stars
Encyclopedia of Popular Music	5/5 stars
Pitchfork	8.8/10

The album reached number 8 in the Billboard 200 chart and number 6 in the R&B Albums chart in 1972.

The album was regarded as an artistic success, but the musical changes that began on its release in 1972 marked the start of a fall in Santana's commercial popularity. In a 2013 interview, drummer and album co-producer Michael Shrieve recalled that Columbia Records president Clive Davis, upon first hearing the finished album, told Santana he was committing "career suicide."

A 1976 review in Rolling Stone by Ralph Gleason said the album "speaks directly to the universality of man, both in the sound of the music and in the vocals." Caravanserai was also voted number 609 in the third edition of Colin Larkin's All Time Top 1000 Albums (2000).

== Track listing ==
Side one
No.	Title	Writer(s)	Length
1.	"Eternal Caravan of Reincarnation" (instrumental)	Tom Rutley, Neal Schon, Michael Shrieve	4:28
2.	"Waves Within" (instrumental)	Doug Rauch, Gregg Rolie, Carlos Santana	3:54
3.	"Look Up (To See What's Coming Down)" (instrumental)	Rauch, Rolie, Santana	3:00
4.	"Just in Time to See the Sun"	Rolie, Santana, Shrieve	2:18
5.	"Song of the Wind" (instrumental)	Rolie, Santana, Schon	6:04
6.	"All the Love of the Universe"	Santana, Schon	7:40

Side two
No.	Title	Writer(s)	Length
7.	"Future Primitive" (instrumental)	José Areas, Mingo Lewis	4:12
8.	"Stone Flower"	Antônio Carlos Jobim (music); Santana, Shrieve (lyrics)	6:15
9.	"La Fuente del Ritmo" (instrumental)	Mingo Lewis	4:34
10.	"Every Step of the Way" (instrumental)	Shrieve	9:05
Total length:			51:33

On the Q8 quad version, "Song of the Wind" and "La Fuente del Ritmo"—the next to last tracks on each side of the LP—were traded to even the timing for the tape.

== Personnel ==
- Carlos Santana – lead guitar (2–4, 8, 9), guitar (5, 6, 10), vocals (4, 6, 8), percussion (1, 8)
- Neal Schon – guitar (1, 3–6, 8–10)
- Gregg Rolie – organ (2–6, 8–10), electric piano (6), vocals (4), piano
- Douglas Rauch – bass (2–6), guitar (2–3)
- Michael Shrieve – drums (1–6, 8–10), percussion, vocals (8)
- José "Chepito" Areas – percussion, congas (7), timbales (2–4, 6–7, 9–10), bongos (8)
- James Mingo Lewis – percussion (1, 8–9), congas (2–10), bongos (7), vocals (6), acoustic piano (9)
- Douglas Rodrigues – guitar (2)
- Wendy Haas – piano (1, 8)
- Tom Rutley – acoustic bass (1, 6, 8–10)
- Armando Peraza – percussion (8), bongos (9)
- Hadley Caliman – saxophone intro (1), flute (10)
- Rico Reyes – vocals (6)
- Lenny White – castanets (6)
- Tom Coster – electric piano (9)
- Tom Harrell – orchestra arrangement (10)

=== Production ===
- Produced by Carlos Santana and Mike Shrieve
- Recorded and engineered by Glen Kolotkin and Mike Larner
- Recorded at Columbia Studios, San Francisco, California, March–May 1972

April 6, recorded All the Love of the Universe

== Charts ==
=== Weekly charts ===
Chart (1972–1973)	Peak position
Australian Albums (Kent Music Report)	16
Canada Top Albums/CDs (RPM)	6
Dutch Albums (Album Top 100)	3
Finnish Albums (The Official Finnish Charts)	3
German Albums (Offizielle Top 100)	13
Italian Albums (Musica e Dischi)	3
Norwegian Albums (VG-lista)	10
Spanish Albums (AFE)	1
UK Albums (Official Charts)	6
US Billboard Top LP's & Tape	8
US Best Selling Soul LP's (Billboard)	6

=== Year-end charts ===
Chart (1973)	Position
German Albums (Offizielle Top 100)	41

== Certifications ==
Region	Certification	Certified units/sales
Canada (Music Canada)	Gold	50,000^{^}
France (SNEP)	Gold	100,000^{*}
United States (RIAA)	Platinum	1,000,000^{^}
^{*} Sales figures based on certification alone.^{^} Shipments figures based on certification alone.
