= Lovell, Wyoming =

- Town
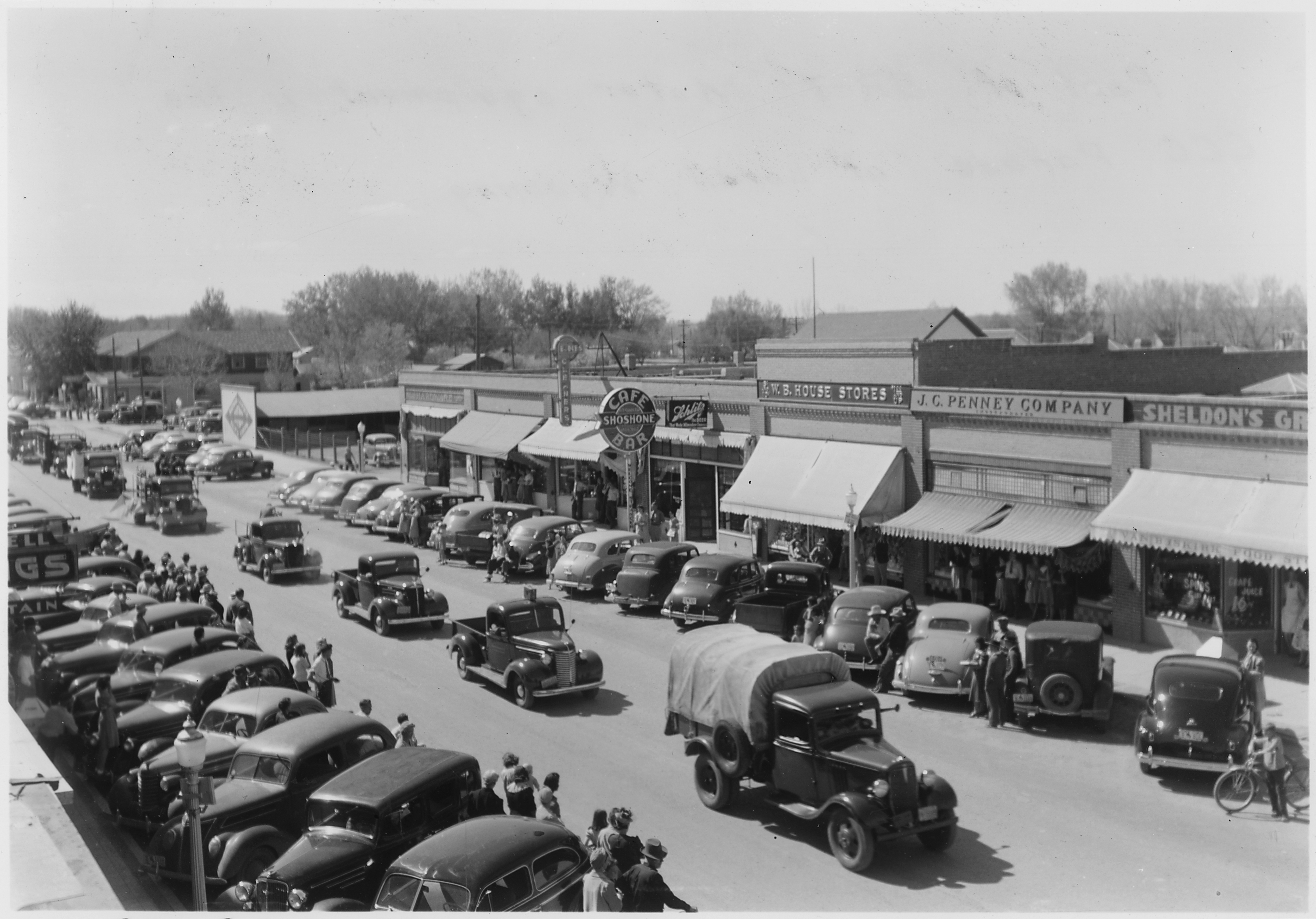
- Parade of vehicles from Civilian Conservation Corps Camp BR-7 in Lovell, Wyoming

- Logo
- Nickname: Rose Town of Wyoming
- Motto: "The Rose City"
- Location of Lovell in Big Horn County, Wyoming
- Coordinates: 44°50′14″N 108°22′51″W
- Country: United States
- State: Wyoming
- County: Big Horn

Area
  - Total: 1.10 sq mi (2.85 km^{2})
  - Land: 1.10 sq mi (2.85 km^{2})
  - Water: 0 sq mi (0.00 km^{2})
- Elevation: 3,835 ft (1,169 m)

Population (2020)
  - Total: 2,243
  - Density: 2,035/sq mi (785.9/km^{2})
- Time zone: UTC-7 (Mountain (MST))
  - Summer (DST): UTC-6 (MDT)
- ZIP code: 82431
- Area code: 307
- FIPS code: 56-47950
- GNIS feature ID: 2412922
- Website: Town of Lovell, Wyoming

Lovell is the largest town in Big Horn County, Wyoming, United States. The population was 2,243 at the 2020 census.

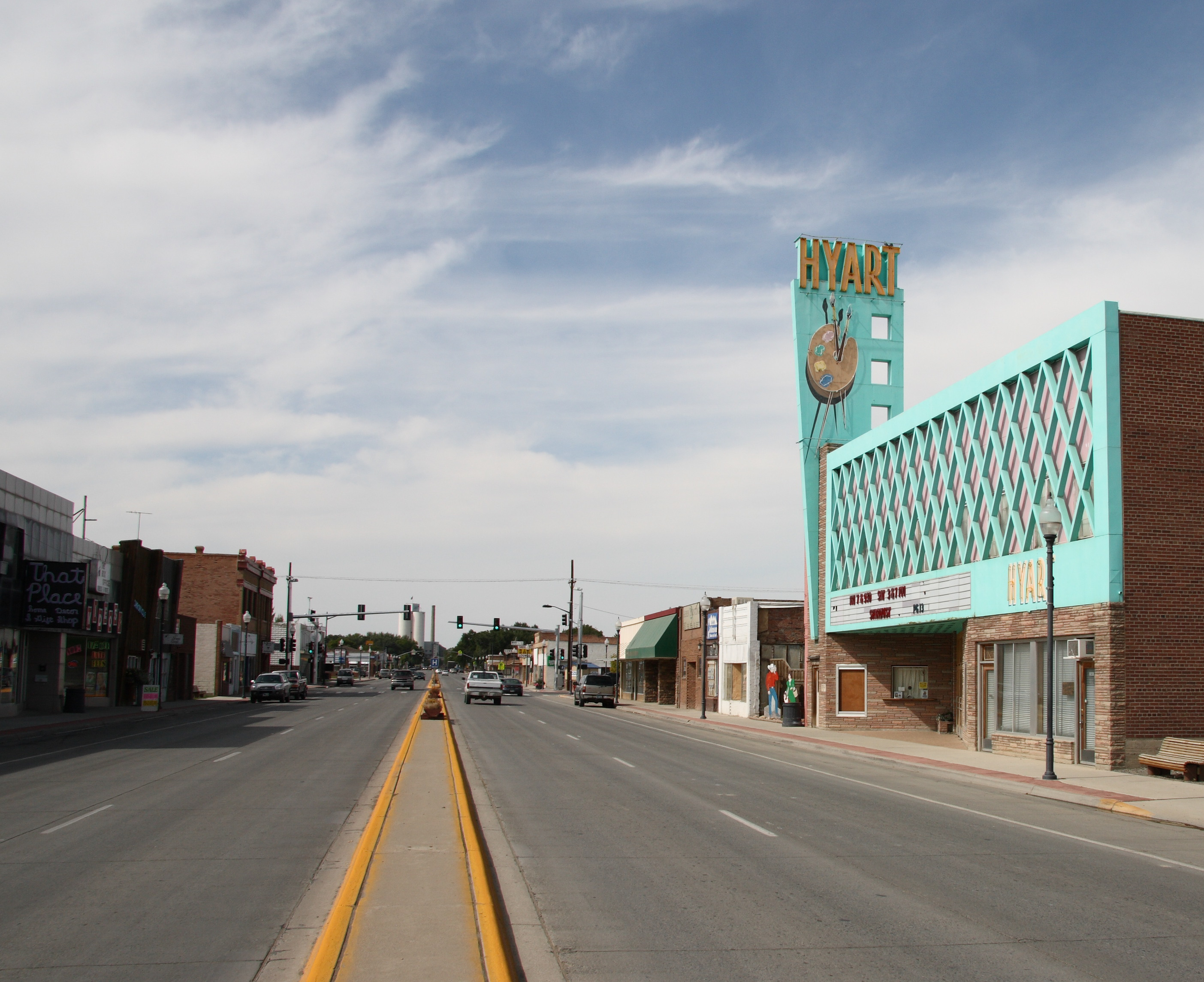
Main street Lovell WY

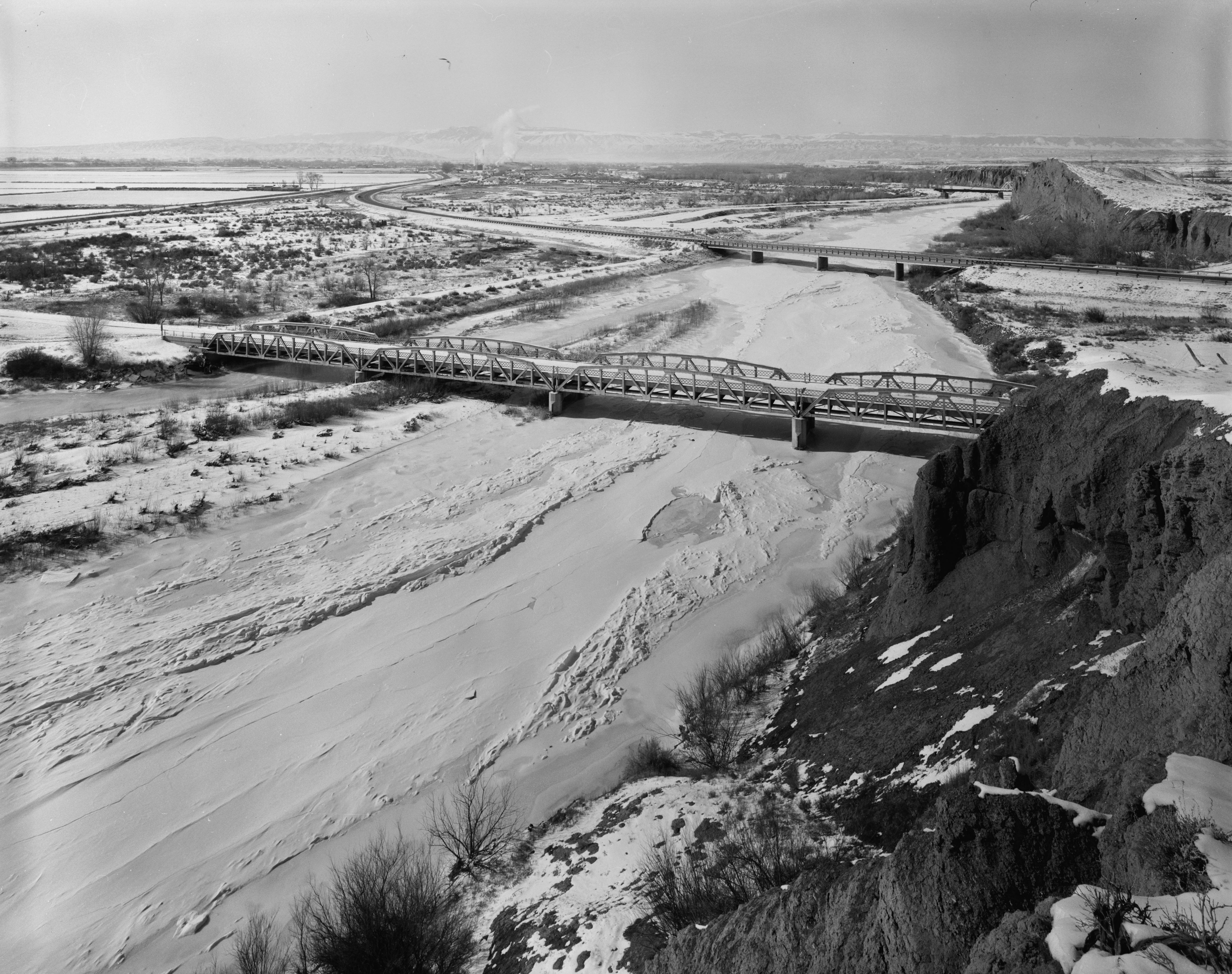
Western side of the EJZ Bridge over Shoshone River, which carries County Road CN9-111 over the Shoshone River near Lovell in Big Horn County, Wyoming, United States.

== History ==
Lovell was named for Henry Lovell, a local rancher.

Built in 1925, the EJZ Bridge over Shoshone River is listed on the National Register of Historic Places.

== Geography ==
According to the United States Census Bureau, the town has a total area of 1.10 square miles (2.85 km^{2}), all land.

=== Climate ===
According to the Köppen Climate Classification system, Lovell has a cold desert climate, abbreviated BWk on climate maps, although it borders a cold semi-arid climate (BSk). The hottest temperature recorded in Lovell was 111 °F (43.9 °C) on June 29, 1919, while the coldest temperature recorded was −48 °F (−44.4 °C) on February 5, 1899.

Climate data for Lovell, Wyoming, 1991–2020 normals, extremes 1897–present
Month	Jan	Feb	Mar	Apr	May	Jun	Jul	Aug	Sep	Oct	Nov	Dec	Year
Record high °F (°C)	63 (17)	71 (22)	83 (28)	90 (32)	99 (37)	111 (44)	107 (42)	105 (41)	99 (37)	89 (32)	74 (23)	66 (19)	111 (44)
Mean maximum °F (°C)	49.0 (9.4)	54.0 (12.2)	67.9 (19.9)	78.2 (25.7)	84.8 (29.3)	92.4 (33.6)	97.1 (36.2)	95.0 (35.0)	90.2 (32.3)	78.8 (26.0)	63.2 (17.3)	52.6 (11.4)	97.8 (36.6)
Mean daily maximum °F (°C)	31.0 (−0.6)	36.1 (2.3)	49.5 (9.7)	58.0 (14.4)	67.0 (19.4)	77.6 (25.3)	86.5 (30.3)	84.7 (29.3)	74.2 (23.4)	58.8 (14.9)	44.3 (6.8)	32.6 (0.3)	58.4 (14.6)
Daily mean °F (°C)	19.2 (−7.1)	24.1 (−4.4)	36.1 (2.3)	44.7 (7.1)	54.4 (12.4)	63.9 (17.7)	71.1 (21.7)	68.5 (20.3)	58.6 (14.8)	45.2 (7.3)	32.1 (0.1)	21.2 (−6.0)	44.9 (7.2)
Mean daily minimum °F (°C)	7.3 (−13.7)	12.1 (−11.1)	22.8 (−5.1)	31.3 (−0.4)	41.8 (5.4)	50.2 (10.1)	55.6 (13.1)	52.4 (11.3)	43.1 (6.2)	31.6 (−0.2)	20.0 (−6.7)	9.8 (−12.3)	31.5 (−0.3)
Mean minimum °F (°C)	−13.1 (−25.1)	−8.8 (−22.7)	4.6 (−15.2)	18.3 (−7.6)	29.1 (−1.6)	39.2 (4.0)	47.6 (8.7)	43.0 (6.1)	31.7 (−0.2)	16.5 (−8.6)	0.4 (−17.6)	−8.8 (−22.7)	−21.2 (−29.6)
Record low °F (°C)	−42 (−41)	−48 (−44)	−28 (−33)	−10 (−23)	18 (−8)	29 (−2)	33 (1)	28 (−2)	14 (−10)	−8 (−22)	−27 (−33)	−43 (−42)	−48 (−44)
Average precipitation inches (mm)	0.19 (4.8)	0.27 (6.9)	0.23 (5.8)	0.67 (17)	1.12 (28)	1.19 (30)	0.56 (14)	0.29 (7.4)	0.79 (20)	0.74 (19)	0.20 (5.1)	0.20 (5.1)	6.45 (163.1)
Average snowfall inches (cm)	3.5 (8.9)	2.8 (7.1)	1.2 (3.0)	0.7 (1.8)	0.1 (0.25)	0.0 (0.0)	0.0 (0.0)	0.0 (0.0)	0.1 (0.25)	0.8 (2.0)	1.5 (3.8)	2.6 (6.6)	13.3 (33.7)
Average precipitation days (≥ 0.01 in)	2.2	2.6	2.7	5.0	6.8	6.8	3.7	3.2	4.1	3.8	2.4	2.1	45.4
Average snowy days (≥ 0.1 in)	1.4	1.7	0.7	0.3	0.0	0.0	0.0	0.0	0.0	0.3	0.8	1.0	6.2
Source 1: NOAA
Source 2: National Weather Service

== Demographics ==
Historical population
Census	Pop.	Note	%±
1910	699		—
1920	1,686		141.2%
1930	1,857		10.1%
1940	2,175		17.1%
1950	2,508		15.3%
1960	2,451		−2.3%
1970	2,371		−3.3%
1980	2,447		3.2%
1990	2,131		−12.9%
2000	2,281		7.0%
2010	2,360		3.5%
2020	2,243		−5.0%
2023 (est.)	2,350	▲	4.8%
U.S. Decennial Census

=== 2010 census ===
At the 2010 census, there were 2,360 people, 909 households and 605 families living in the town. The population density was 2,145.5 inhabitants per square mile (828.4/km^{2}). There were 1,013 housing units at an average density of 920.9 per square mile (355.6/km^{2}). The racial makeup of the town was 94.0% White, 0.3% African American, 0.6% Native American, 0.6% Asian, 3.5% from other races, and 1.1% from two or more races. Hispanic or Latino of any race were 10.8% of the population.

There were 909 households, of which 33.6% had children under the age of 18 living with them, 51.5% were married couples living together, 11.0% had a female householder with no husband present, 4.1% had a male householder with no wife present, and 33.4% were non-families. 29.6% of all households were made up of individuals, and 13.3% had someone living alone who was 65 years of age or older. The average household size was 2.51 and the average family size was 3.13.

The median age was 36 years. 27.4% of residents were under the age of 18; 9.4% were between the ages of 18 and 24; 20.6% were from 25 to 44; 23.4% were from 45 to 64; and 19.3% were 65 years of age or older. The gender makeup of the town was 48.4% male and 51.6% female.

=== 2000 census ===
At the 2000 census, there were 2,281 people, 896 households and 613 families living in the town. The population density was 2,141.6 per square mile (823.1/km^{2}). There were 1,013 housing units at an average density of 951.1 per square mile (365.5/km^{2}). The racial makeup of the town was 90.93% White, 0.04% African American, 0.70% Native American, 0.18% Asian, 0.13% Pacific Islander, 5.66% from other races, and 2.37% from two or more races. Hispanic or Latino of any race were 9.16% of the population.

There were 896 households, of which 31.9% had children under the age of 18 living with them, 54.9% were married couples living together, 9.6% had a female householder with no husband present, and 31.5% were non-families. 27.7% of all households were made up of individuals, and 15.6% had someone living alone who was 65 years of age or older. The average household size was 2.55 and the average family size was 3.14.

29.2% of the population were under the age of 18, 9.8% from 18 to 24, 22.0% from 25 to 44, 21.5% from 45 to 64, and 17.6% who were 65 years of age or older. The median age was 36 years. For every 100 females, there were 100.4 males. For every 100 females age 18 and over, there were 94.9 males.

The median household income was $30,745 and the median family income was $35,815. Males had a median income of $30,698 compared with $20,313 for females. The per capita income was $13,772. About 11.0% of families and 14.9% of the population were below the poverty line, including 19.5% of those under age 18 and 8.3% of those age 65 or over.

== Arts and culture ==
=== Points of interest ===
- Bighorn Canyon National Recreation Area
- Big Horn Mountains
- Big Horn River
- Buffalo Bill Historical Center
- Hyart Theater
- Queen Bee Gardens

== Education ==
Public education in the town of Lovell is provided by Big Horn County School District #2. Lovell is home to Lovell Elementary School (grades K-5), Lovell Middle School (grades 6–8), and Lovell High School (grades 9-12).

Lovell has a public library, a branch of the Big Horn County Library System.

== Media ==
Radion station KWHO (107.1 FM) is licensed to Lovell.

Television stations airing in Lovell include KTVQ (CBS), KULR (NBC), and KCWC-DT (PBS, local translator K19LM-D).

The Lovell Chronicle is a weekly newspaper published since 1906.

== Notable people ==
- Don G. Despain (born 1940), botanist, ecologist
- Richard Kermode (1946–1996), keyboardist for Santana and other bands

== In the media ==
The town was the center of a scandal in the 1980s when Dr. John Story was discovered to be sexually abusing patients. He was convicted on six separate charges of sexually assaulting his patients in 1985.
