= Hyart Theater =

Historic movie theater in Wyoming, United States

- U.S. National Register of Historic Places
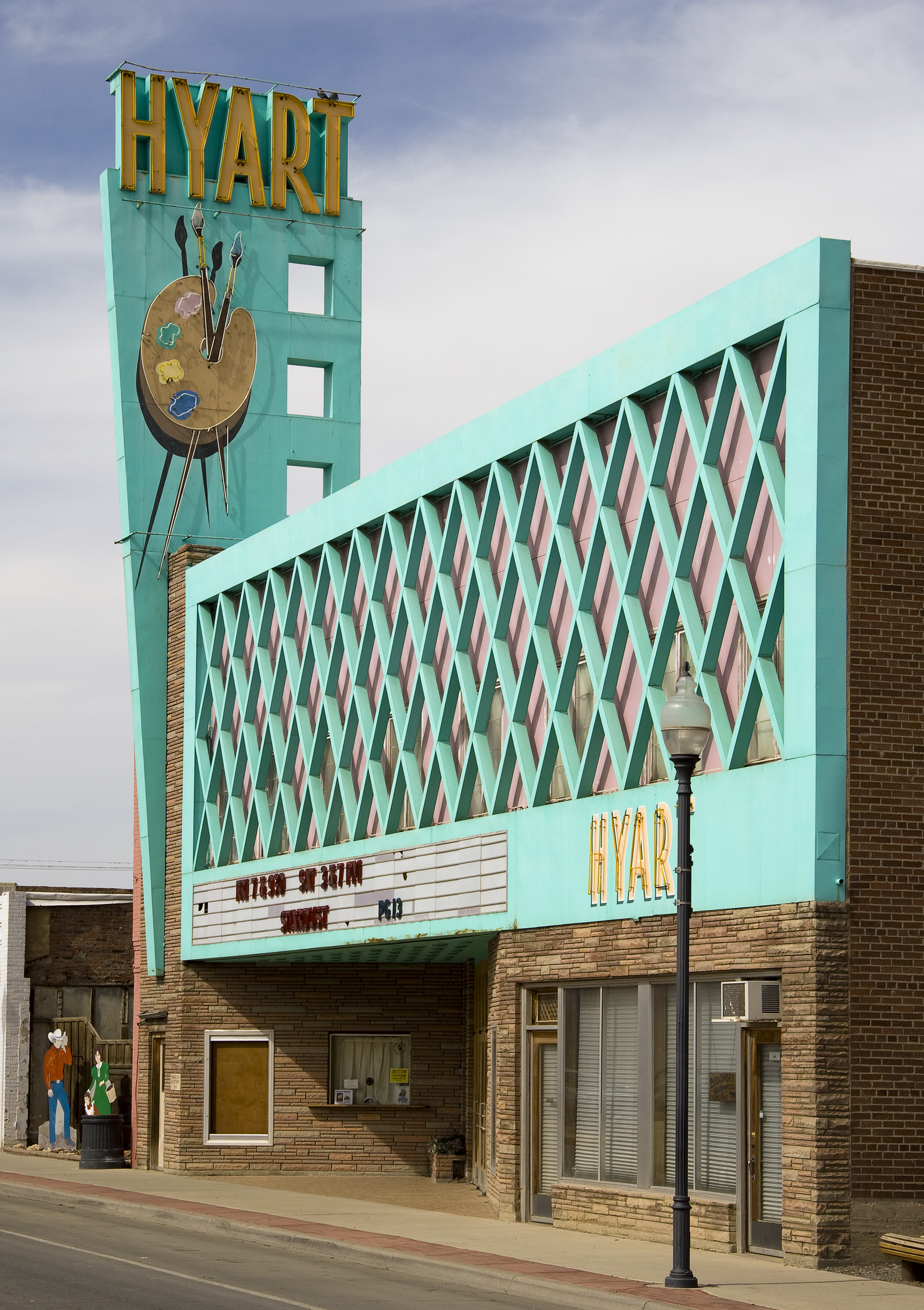

- Location within Wyoming Location within the United States
- Location: 251 E. Main St., Lovell, Wyoming
- Built: 1950
- Architect: Hy Bischoff
- NRHP reference No.: 08001304
- Added to NRHP: January 8, 2009

The Hyart Theater was built in Lovell, Wyoming, by Hyrum "Hy" Bischoff in 1950. It is a rare Wyoming example of a cinema from the early 1950s. The building is notable for the turquoise-colored metal lattice screen that covers a pink metal facade, as well as for its tall neon pylon sign.

The Bischoff family was part of a Mormon group sent from Fountain Green, Utah, to settle in the Big Horn Basin of Wyoming. Dan Bischoff (1870-1936) bought the Armada Theater in Lovell in 1913 and converted it into a cinema. His son Hy took over the business on his father's death and operated two Armada theaters. Determining to build a new cinema, Hy toured the mountain states region looking at other cinemas. The 1949 Villa Theatre in Salt Lake City particularly impressed Bischoff, and he modeled the Hyart's lobby after the Villa's. Bischoff designed his new theater and directed the construction. Owing to shortages of steel during the Korean War, Bischoff obtained salvaged rails from the mines at Bearcreek, Montana and had them fashioned into steel roof trusses.

The two-story building measures approximately 224 feet (68 m) deep by 70 feet (21 m) wide, facing onto Main Street. The walls are structural clay tile faced with brick, while the lower portion of the street facade is faced with small brick-like slabs of rhyolite from Idaho Falls, Idaho. The upper part of the street elevation is covered with pink sheet metal and screened by an elaborate diagonal lattice of turquoise metal. An office and apartment are located on the second floor, with eight windows behind the lattice. Pink neon lights outline the facade behind the lattice. A tall pylon features a neon-lighted artist's palette and the word HYART at a right angle to the street.

The interior features the original carpeting and painted scrollwork above paneling. Originally seating 1001, the Hyart now seats 940, including a balcony with more than 200 seats. The theater includes a soundproof "crying room" for parents with crying babies.

In 1960 Hy's daughter Loretta took over the management of the theater. Hy died in 1988 and Loretta closed the theater in 1992. The Hyart was re-opened by a community group in 2004.

The Hyart was listed on the National Register of Historic Places in 2008.
