= Gimnasio Nacional =

Sports arena in San José, Costa Rica

- Gimnasio de La Sabana
- Interactive map of Gimnasio Nacional
- Full name: Gimnasio Nacional Eddy Cortés
- Location: San José (San José, Costa Rica)
- Coordinates: 9°55′59″N 84°5′55″W
- Capacity: 4,000

Construction
- Opened: 19 February 1960
- Renovated: 2012, 2015

The Eddy Cortés National Gymnasium (Spanish: Gimnasio Nacional Eddy Cortés), better known as National Gymnasium (Spanish: Gimnasio Nacional), is a sports arena located in La Sabana Metropolitan Park, San José, Costa Rica. Its capacity is over 4,000.

== History ==
The gymnasium was opened on 19 February 1960. President Mario Echandi Jiménez was present at the inauguration. The arena was originally used for bullfights, and it originally did not have a roof. After being used for decades, the building fell into disrepair, as teams complained about the leaking roof, small size of the gymnasium, and worn out electrical system. Soon after, the roof was changed in 2012 and the ventilation system, electrical wiring and electronic marker control console were fixed in 2015.

Today, the structure is mostly used for basketball games, gymnastics competitions, graduation ceremonies, and other events.

== Concerts ==
Despite being used mostly as a sporting venue, Gimnasio Nacional is occasionally used for concerts. Santana's concert here on 29 September 1973 holds the distinction of the first rock concert held in Costa Rica.

List of concerts held at Gimnasio Nacional
Date	Artists	Tours	Supporting Acts
29 September 1973	Santana	Caravanserai Tour	—N/a
14 April 1994	Depeche Mode	Exotic Tour/Summer Tour '94	April's Motel Room
6 February 1996	Soda Stereo	—N/a	
19 August 2011	Yuri	—N/a	
19 September 2013	Café Tacuba	—N/a	
