= Lovell Chronicle =

Weekly newspaper in Lovell, Wyoming, USA

- Type: Weekly newspaper
- Founder: J.P. May
- Publisher: David Peck
- Founded: 1906
- Language: English
- Headquarters: 234 E. Main St. Lovell, Wy 82431
- Circulation: 1,655
- Website: lovellchronicle.com

The Lovell Chronicle is a regional weekly newspaper published in Lovell, Wyoming. It covers news and sports for the cities of Lovell, Byron, Cowley, Deaver and Frannie. The first edition was printed on May 31, 1906. The Chronicle has maintained the same name since it was founded. It has a circulation of 1,655.

== History ==
In 1906, J.P. May founded the Lovell Chronicle. In 1908, he was succeeded as editor by William M. "Jonesy" Jones, followed in 1910 by Reyn Leedom. Leedom published the Chronicle until 1926, when it was purchased by E.O. "Ted" Huntington. In 1954, Huntington died in a car crash. In 1955, his widow Francine Huntington transferred ownership of the paper to her son, Bert Huntington. In 1970, brothers Bob and Roy Peck, along with Ron Lytle bought the paper. Roy Peck was a prominent Wyoming state senator who unsuccessfully ran for governor. He died in 1983, and was succeeded as Chronicle editor by his son David Peck.
