= Bossa n' Ramones =

Bossa N' Ramones

Compilation album by Various artists
- Released: June 10, 2008
- Genre: Electronic
- Length: 75:28
- Label: Music Brokers ARG

Bossa N' Ramones is an electronic compilation album that contains covers of the punk rock band The Ramones with an acid jazz, house and dance themes. This album is part of the sub-label PMB "chill-out" albums, that come from the Music Brokers original label formed in Argentina. These covers are Ramones' famous songs including "Sheena Is a Punk Rocker", "Blitzkrieg Bop" and "I Wanna Be Sedated".

== Track listing ==
1. "Intro" – 1:55
2. "Here Today, Gone Tomorrow" (Currie) – 3:29
3. "I Wanna Be Your Boyfriend" (Amazonics) – 2:46
4. "I Just Want to Have Something to Do" (Bowie) – 2:40
5. "She's a Sensation" (Brazil Twenty One, Costa) – 3:57
6. "Poison Heart" (Monasterio) – 4:32
7. "Beat On the Brat" (Digitalistas) – 4:08
8. "I Wanna Be Sedated" (Groove Da Praia) – 3:56
9. "Sheena Is a Punk Rocker" (Luana, Sixth Finger) – 3:21
10. "Rockaway Beach" (DJ Leao, Renoir) – 3:37
11. "Pet Sematary" (Gate) – 4:15
12. "Blitzkrieg Bop" (Jose Areas, Glambeats Corp.) – 3:59
13. "The KKK Took My Baby Away" (United Rhythms of Brazil) – 3:33
14. "Outro" – 30:46
