= Palais d'Hiver =

Coordinates: 45.7727°N 4.8590°E

Palais d'Hiver (English: "Winter Palace") was a music hall located in Lyon, France. It was the largest music hall in Europe from 1963 until its destruction in 1988. Over the years it hosted many notable performers such as The Beatles, Thin Lizzy, Fernandel, Josephine Baker, Jacques Brel, Johnny Hallyday and Santana.
