= Stadthalle Freiburg =

Coordinates: 47°59′12.7″N 7°52′21.7″E

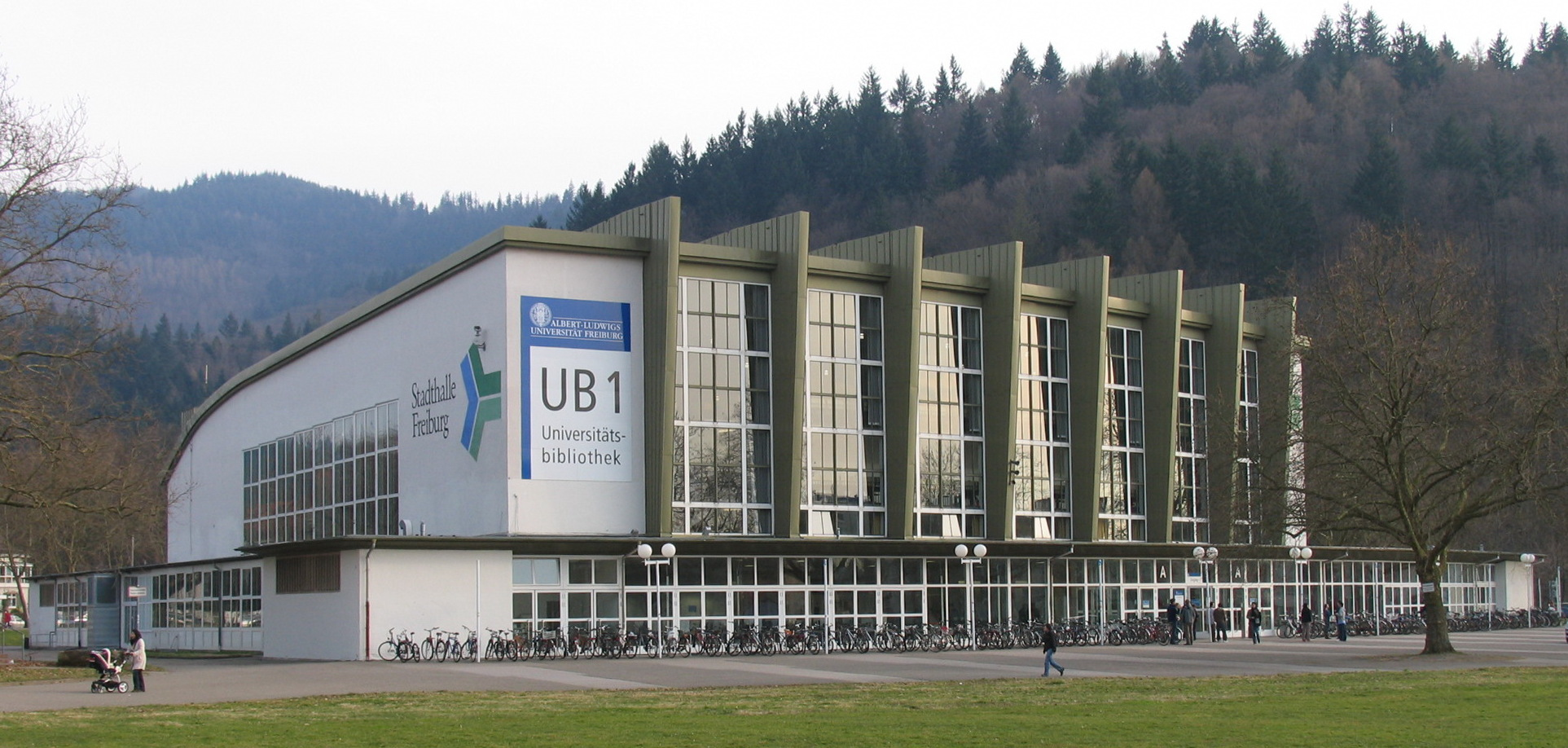
Stadthalle Freiburg

Stadthalle Freiburg is a former concert and multi-purpose hall located in Freiburg im Breisgau, Germany. Notable past performers include Uriah Heep, The Police, Thin Lizzy and Whitesnake. It opened in 1954. From 2008 to 2015 the building was as a temporary location for University Library Freiburg while the main library underwent renovations. In 2015 and 2016 it was used for refugee accommodation.
