= Lovell High School =

Public high school in Lovell, Wyoming, United States

Location
- 502 Hampshire Avenue; Lovell, Wyoming 82431; United States; 44°50′10″N 108°24′9″W

Information
- School district: Big Horn County School District Number 2
- Teaching staff: 17.01 (on an FTE basis)
- Grades: 9-12
- Enrollment: 218 (2023-2024)
- Student to teacher ratio: 12.82
- Colors: Blue and white
- Website: lhs.bgh2.org

Lovell High School is a public high school in Lovell, Wyoming, United States. The campus serves students in grades nine through twelve and is part of Big Horn County School District #2. Their mascot is the Bulldog. In September 2009 they moved down to the 2A size classification.
