= Richard Kermode =

Background information
- Born: October 5, 1946; Lovell, Wyoming, U.S.
- Origin: Buffalo, New York, U.S.
- Died: January 16, 1996 (aged 49) Denver, Colorado, U.S.
- Genres: Rock; blues rock; psychedelic rock; funk rock; Latin rock; jazz fusion
- Occupation: Keyboardist
- Instruments: Keyboards; percussion
- Labels: Columbia; Blue Thumb; Warner Bros.; Just Sunshine; Asylum; Fantasy; Epic; EsGo
- Formerly of: Janis Joplin; Luis Gasca; Malo; Santana; Betty Davis; Ned Doheny; José Areas; Patti LaBelle; Pete Escovedo

Richard Kermode (October 5, 1946 – January 16, 1996) was an American keyboardist, known for performing with Janis Joplin, Malo, Santana, and Ray Cepeda.

== History ==
Richard Kermode was born on October 5, 1946, in Lovell, Wyoming. Kermode grew up in Buffalo, New York, and attended Kenmore West Senior High School. By his teens, he was already a talented organist playing in a jazz trio called Milestones in Niagara Falls, Ontario. In 1969, he moved to San Francisco, where he became a member of Janis Joplin's Kozmic Blues Band, and he performed with them at the Woodstock festival in the same year. After Joplin's death in 1970, he joined the Latin rock band Malo. After leaving Malo in 1972, he became a member of Santana, and he played on their Welcome album as well as touring with them during their 1972–1973 tour of Caravanserai. After quitting the band in 1974, he became mainly a session musician. He recorded and played with Ray Cepeda, on Areas 51: Return of the Alien. Recorded in 1988 With Jose Chepito Areas at Hyde St. Studios SF, and released in 2019.

In 1990, Kermode suffered severe kidney and liver ailments, but recovered and continued touring worldwide, moving to Denver, Colorado, in 1994 to work on salsa music projects. He died on January 16, 1996, at Denver Health Medical Center in Denver after a brief illness, aged 49.

== Legacy ==
In 2008, Kermode was posthumously inducted into the Buffalo Music Hall of Fame.
