= World Series of Rock =

Rock concert in Cleveland, Ohio

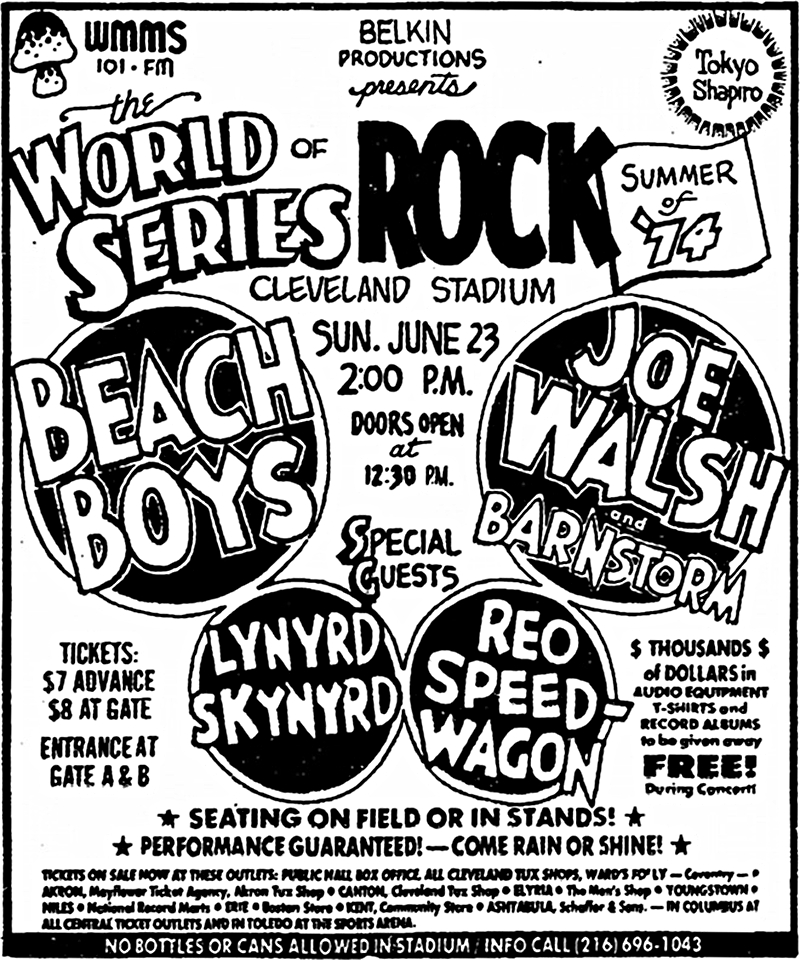
An ad for the 1974 concert

The World Series of Rock was a recurring, day-long multi-act summer rock concert held at Cleveland Stadium in Cleveland, Ohio from 1974 through 1980. Belkin Productions staged these events, attracting popular hard rock bands and as many as 88,000 fans. FM rock radio station WMMS sponsored the concerts. Attendance was by general admission.

The World Series of Rock was known not only for its arena rock spectacle, but was also notorious for the rowdiness, rampant drug use and drunkenness of the crowd. As a result, concertgoers occasionally fell—or jumped—off the steep stadium upper deck onto the concrete seating area far below, causing serious injury. The Cleveland Free Clinic staffed aid stations in the stadium with physicians, nurses and other volunteers, and through 1977, made its treatment statistics public. From 1978, Belkin Productions conditioned its funding of the Free Clinic on the Clinic's nondisclosure of the number of Clinic staff on duty at the concerts, the nature of conditions treated, and quantity of patients treated.

Cleveland Stadium was the home field of the Cleveland Indians baseball team, so Belkin could only schedule stadium concerts for dates when the Indians were playing out of town. Stadium officials allowed seating on the playing field, which required fixing the turf before the Indians returned home. The fourth concert of 1975 was followed by heavy rain the next day, leaving the field in poor condition for the remainder of the season. Following the 1975 Cleveland Browns football season, groundskeepers completely resurfaced the field, and installed a drainage system, to repair damage from the rock concerts. The first concert of 1976 was scheduled for July 11 with Aerosmith, Todd Rundgren's Utopia, Jeff Beck (with the Jan Hammer Group) and Derringer. However, the concert was canceled after stadium officials refused to allow seating on the field to prevent damage to the new turf and Aerosmith would not play without fans on the field. No concerts took place at Cleveland Stadium in 1976 though Belkin resumed the series in 1977 after stadium groundskeepers employed a field-covering system consisting of plywood and outdoor carpeting.

The third concert of the 1978 season featuring Fleetwood Mac, originally scheduled for August 5, had to be canceled at the last minute due to a sudden illness suffered by Lindsey Buckingham. The rest of the band, Mick Fleetwood, John McVie, Christine McVie and Stevie Nicks, flew to Cleveland to hold a press conference to explain the cancellation. The concert was rescheduled for August 26, forcing the cancellation of the fourth World Series of Rock featuring Bob Seger and the Silver Bullet Band, Todd Rundgren and Utopia, Blue Öyster Cult and the Cars that was originally scheduled for that date.

Violence outside the stadium marred the July 28, 1979 concert. There were five shootings (including one fatality), dozens of robberies and numerous incidents of violence around the stadium in the early morning hours before the concert, where thousands of fans waited overnight. The next concert featuring Foreigner, Kansas, the Cars, the Tubes, David Johansen and Breathless was originally slated for Sunday, August 19, 1979. At the request of city officials, the concert was rescheduled to Saturday night at 8:00 pm for security reasons, but after receiving many complaints from parents about the late ending time, Belkin canceled the concert. Afterwards, Art Modell, the head of Stadium Corp., stated there would be no more World Series of Rock concerts held at the stadium.

One final World Series of Rock concert, headlined by Bob Seger, took place on July 19, 1980. The ticket price was $12.50 (equivalent to $48 in 2024).

Cleveland Stadium was demolished in 1996, two years after the Indians moved to Progressive Field and several months after the Browns relocated to Baltimore, and replaced with FirstEnergy Stadium built on the same site. County Stadium in Milwaukee, Wisconsin staged its own series of rock festivals, also called the World Series of Rock, in the early 1980s. Since then, "World Series of Rock" has become a generic term for multi-act concerts.

== Concert lineups ==
June 23, 1974

- The Beach Boys
- Joe Walsh and Barnstorm
- Lynyrd Skynyrd
- REO Speedwagon

August 4, 1974

- Emerson, Lake & Palmer
- Climax Blues Band
- James Gang

August 31, 1974

- Crosby, Stills, Nash & Young
- Santana
- The Band
- Jesse Colin Young

May 31, 1975

- The Beach Boys
- Chicago

June 14, 1975

- The Rolling Stones (featuring Billy Preston)
- Tower of Power
- The J. Geils Band
- Joe Vitale's Madmen

July 11, 1975

- Yes
- Joe Walsh
- Michael Stanley Band
- Ace

August 23, 1975

- Rod Stewart and Faces
- Uriah Heep
- Aerosmith
- Blue Öyster Cult
- Mahogany Rush

June 5, 1977

- Ted Nugent
- Todd Rundgren's Utopia
- Nazareth
- Southside Johnny and the Asbury Jukes

June 25, 1977

- Pink Floyd

August 6, 1977

- Peter Frampton
- Bob Seger and the Silver Bullet Band
- The J. Geils Band
- Derringer

July 1, 1978

- The Rolling Stones
- Kansas
- Peter Tosh

July 15, 1978

- Electric Light Orchestra
- Foreigner
- Journey
- Trickster

August 26, 1978

- Fleetwood Mac
- Bob Welch
- The Cars
- Todd Rundgren and Utopia
- Eddie Money

July 28, 1979

- Aerosmith
- Ted Nugent
- Journey
- Thin Lizzy
- AC/DC
- Scorpions

July 19, 1980

- Bob Seger and the Silver Bullet Band
- The J. Geils Band
- Eddie Money
- Def Leppard

== Footnotes ==
Peter Frampton also played at this event. He stole the show, ask anyone who was there.
