= Plaza para todos de Maracaibo =

Stadium in Maracaibo, Venezuela

Coordinates: 10.694061°N 71.63675°W

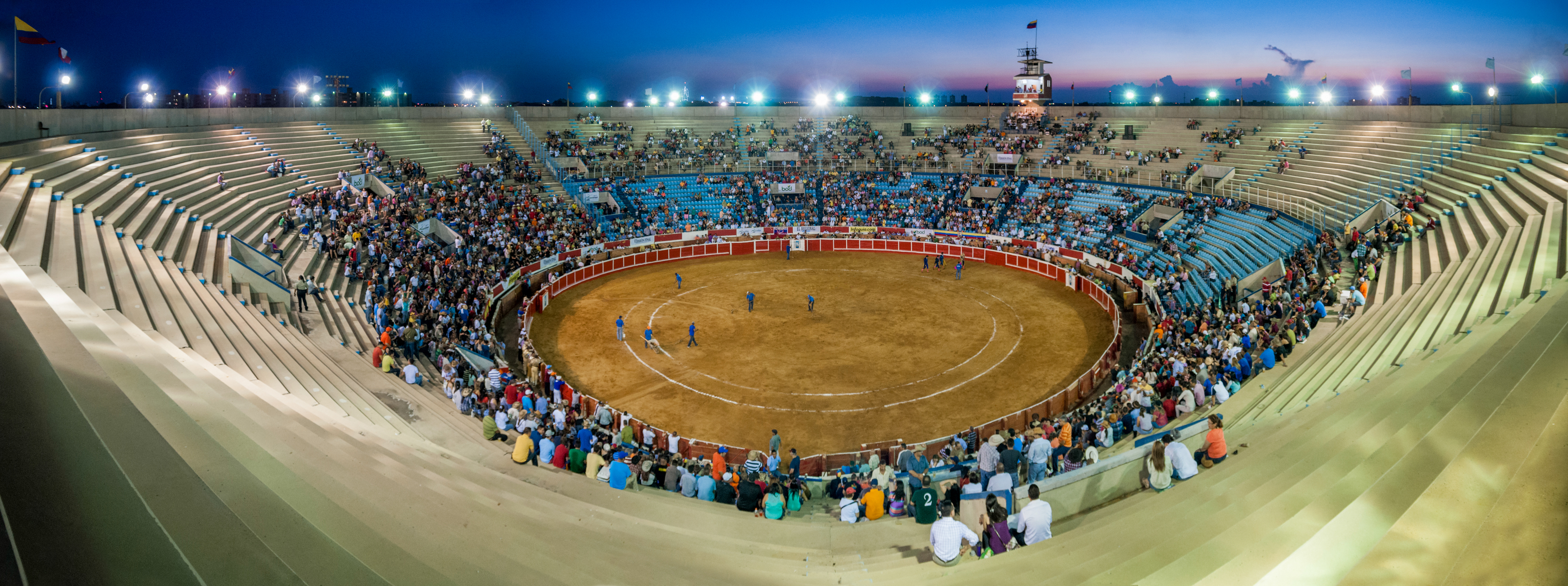
Plaza para todos de Maracaibo

Plaza para Todos de Maracaibo is a stadium in Maracaibo, Venezuela. It was used for bull fighting until 2017 when the government of Maracaibo prohibited that activity due to being considered animal cruelty. The venue holds 15,000 people and was built in 1972.
