= Big Horn County School District Number 2 =

School district in Wyoming, United States

Big Horn County School District #2 is a public school district based in Lovell, Wyoming, United States.

== Geography ==
Big Horn County School District #2 serves the northern portion of Big Horn County as well as a very small, detached tract of land in northeastern Park County. Lovell is the only incorporated town in the district.

== Schools ==
- Lovell High School (Grades 9–12)
- Lovell Middle School (Grades 6–8)
- Lovell Elementary School (Grades K-5)

== Student demographics ==
The following figures are as of October 1, 2009.

- Total District Enrollment: 660
- Student enrollment by gender
  - Male: 323 (48.94%)
  - Female: 337 (51.06%)
- Student enrollment by ethnicity
  - American Indian or Alaska Native: 6 (0.91%)
  - Asian: 6 (0.91%)
  - Hispanic or Latino: 61 (9.24%)
  - White: 587 (88.94%)

== See also ==
- List of school districts in Wyoming
