= Fukuoka Kyuden Kinen Gymnasium =

Sports facility in Chuo-ku, Fukuoka, Japan

Coordinates: 33°34′36″N 130°23′45″E

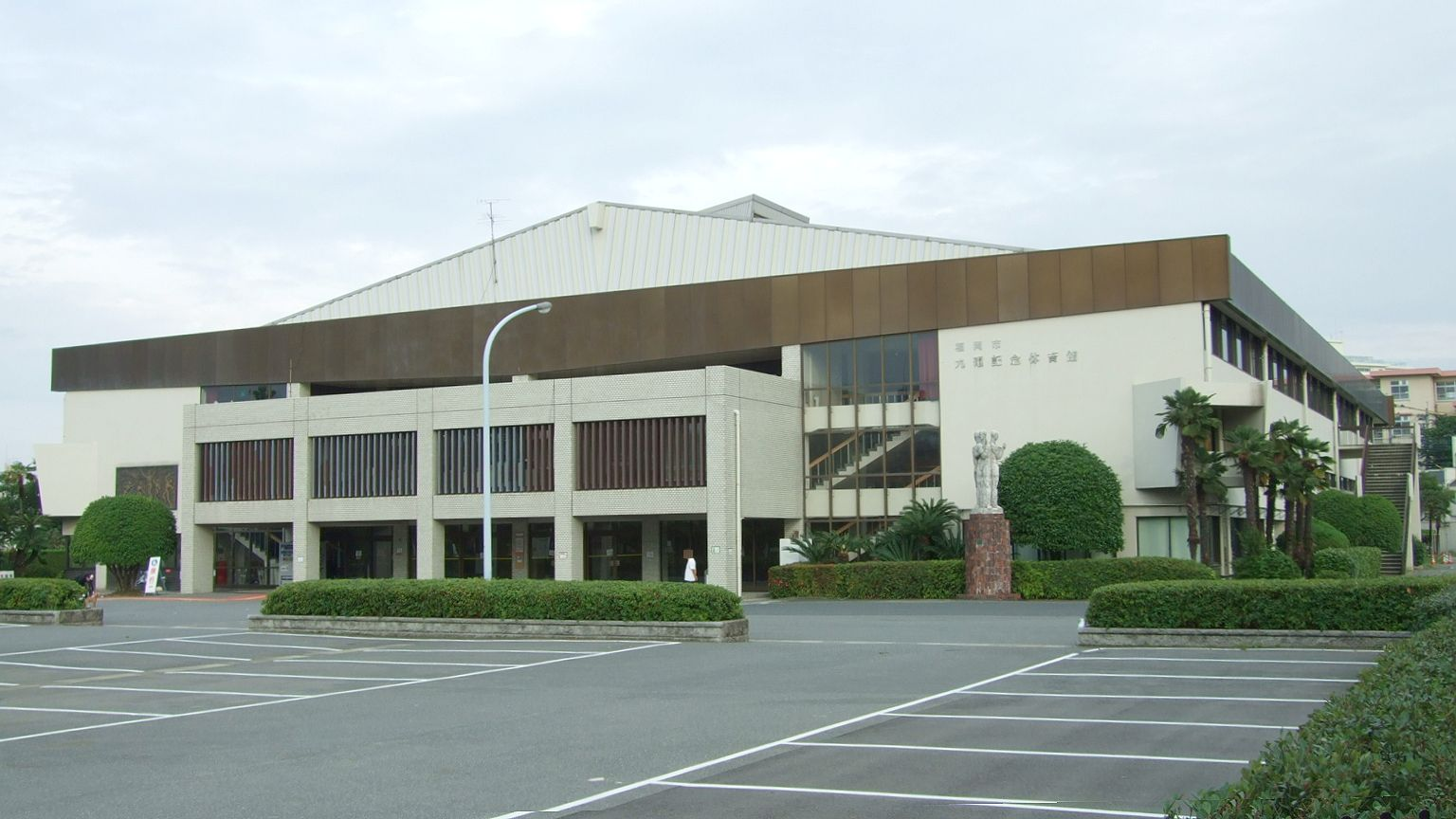
- Interactive map of Fukuoka Kyuden Kinen Gymnasium
- Full name: Fukuoka-shi Kyuden Kinen Taiikukan
- Location: Chuo-ku, Fukuoka, Japan
- Capacity: 1,992
- Parking: 150 spaces

Construction
- Opened: 1964

Fukuoka Kyuden Kinen Gymnasium (福岡市九電記念体育館, Fukuoka-shi Kyūden Kinen Taiikukan) is a sports and entertainment facility in Chuo-ku, Fukuoka, Japan. The building was opened by Kyushu Electric Power in 1964, and transferred to the city of Fukuoka in 2003, with the land loaned at no cost. It has a seating capacity of 1,992, with provision for a further 380 standing spectators.

In April 2013, Kyushu Electric Power announced that it was planning to sell the site to make up for losses accrued due to the shutdown of its nuclear reactors following the 2011 Tohoku earthquake and tsunami. The building would close in 2019, by which date a new facility was completed in Higashi-ku, Fukuoka.
