= Incident at Neshabur =

Single by Santana

from the album Abraxas
- Released: September 1970
- Recorded: Spring 1970
- Genre: Jazz-rock
- Length: 4:57
- Label: Columbia
- Songwriter(s): Alberto Gianquinto; Carlos Santana

Santana singles chronology
"Oye Como Va" (1970)	"Incident at Neshabur" (1970)	"Se a Cabo" (1970)

"Incident at Neshabur" is the fourth track from the 1970 Santana album Abraxas. Co-written by pianist Alberto Gianquinto and Carlos Santana, the instrumental has several jazz-inspired rhythm and time signature changes.

== Origins, composition and meaning ==
As Carlos Santana stated, "Neshabur is where the army of Toussaint Louverture – who was a black revolutionary – defeated Napoleon in Haiti. So that's what it's about. I think by writing songs like 'Incident at Neshabur' and 'Toussaint L'Overture,' we felt we were our own kind of revolutionary [...] Alberto Gianquinto, our pianist on Abraxas, helped us a lot putting it together. The first part of the music is from Horace Silver's 'Señor Blues.' The slow part is [...] from Aretha Franklin's 'This Girl's In Love With You.'"

There seems to be no place called Neshabur on Haiti or associated with the Haitian Revolution, nor has there been a single event in which the French army under Napoleon (who was never in Haiti) was defeated by the rebels under Toussaint (who had by then died in a prison cell in France). Possible incidents serving as inspiration may have been the 1804 Haitian massacre, in which almost the entire white population of Haiti was killed, or the destruction and subsequent massacre of the entire population of Nishapur (also called Neshabur) in current day Iran by the Mongols in 1221.

== Releases ==
As well as Abraxas, this song appears on several compilations such as Lotus, Viva Santana!, The Best of Santana Vol. 2, Santana and Shorter at Montreux and Santana.

In the live album Fillmore: The Last Days which includes works from 14 different bands, Santana presents the song to critical acclaim. Allmusic describes the performance as "strong showing" and, despite negative review of the album, Hooterollin' Around writes that "only Santana really stands out, with 'Incident at Neshabur' and a unique version of Miles Davis's 'In a Silent Way.'"

The performance is shown in the music documentary film Fillmore released on June 14, 1972.
