= Welcome (Santana album) =

Studio album by Santana
- Released: November 9, 1973
- Recorded: April to June 1973
- Genres: Jazz fusion; Latin rock; Latin Jazz
- Length: 50:39
- Label: Columbia
- Producers: Carlos Santana, Mike Shrieve, Tom Coster

Santana chronology
Caravanserai (1972)	Welcome (1973)	Lotus (1974)

Welcome is the fifth studio album by Santana, released in 1973. It followed the jazz-fusion formula that the preceding Caravanserai had inaugurated, but with an expanded and different lineup this time. Gregg Rolie had left the band along with Neal Schon to form Journey, and they were replaced by Tom Coster, Richard Kermode and Leon Thomas, along with guest John McLaughlin, who had collaborated with Carlos Santana on Love Devotion Surrender. Welcome also featured John Coltrane's widow, Alice, as a pianist on the album's opening track, "Going Home", and Flora Purim (the wife of Airto Moreira) on vocals. Welcome was far more experimental than the first four albums, and did not produce any hit singles.

In 2003, the album was re-released with a bonus track, "Mantra", described by AllMusic reviewer Thom Jurek as "a killer improv tune with a ferocious bass solo by Rauch and insane drumming by Shrieve."

== Reception ==
Professional ratings
Review scores
Source	Rating
AllMusic	4/5 stars
Christgau's Record Guide	B+
Rolling Stone	(favorable)
The Rolling Stone Album Guide	3.5/5 stars
All About Jazz	4.5/5 stars
DownBeat	3/5 stars

Writing for Rolling Stone, Robert Palmer called Welcome "the most rhythmically satisfying rock recording since Professor Longhair's," and noted that the rhythm section is "at its loosest and best." He commented: "There may not be another 'Black Magic Woman' here, but there is enough of the old Latin fire to satisfy the fans, as well as a promising expansion of sources and resources."

DownBeat reviewer Eric Kriss gave the release 3 stars. He wrote, "Santana changes musical temperament like a chameleon on amphetamines . . . With so many different musicians, the end product is bound to be a mixed bag —some good, some bad — and that's what we have here". Kriss praises the track "Welcome" and singles out Flora Purim's contribution on "Yours is the Light".

Critic Robert Christgau stated that the album "proves that a communion of multipercussive rock and transcendentalist jazz can move the unenlightened--me, for instance. Good themes, good playing, good beat, and let us not forget good singing."

In a review for AllMusic, Thom Jurek wrote: "Welcome is a jazz record with rock elements, not a rock record that flirted with jazz and Latin musical forms... Welcome was... ahead of its time as a musical journey and is one of the more enduring recordings the band ever made. This is a record that pushes the envelope even today and is one of the most inspired recordings in the voluminous Santana oeuvre."

Jeff Winbush of All About Jazz described the album as "the summit of Santana's jazz fusion era," and remarked: "The secret weapon is Michael Shrieve's energetic drumming and the dual keyboard attack of Coster and Kermode. They push and pull Santana to go beyond and stop holding back."

In 2023 album was remastered and released in SACD format with both stereo and quadrophonic mixes (but no bonus track).

== Track listing ==
Side one
No.	Title	Lyrics	Music	Length
1.	"Going Home"	Instrumental	Adapted from Antonín Dvořák's "New World Symphony" composed by William Arms Fisher; arr.: Alice Coltrane and Santana Band	4:11
2.	"Love, Devotion & Surrender"	Carlos Santana	Santana, Richard Kermode	3:38
3.	"Samba de Sausalito"	Instrumental	José Areas	3:11
4.	"When I Look into Your Eyes"	Michael Shrieve	Shrieve, Tom Coster	5:52
5.	"Yours Is the Light"	Shrieve	Kermode	5:47

Side two
No.	Title	Lyrics	Music	Length
6.	"Mother Africa"	Instrumental	Herbie Mann; arr. by Coster, Santana – Adapted from Herbie Mann's "Candle Dance"	5:55
7.	"Light of Life"	Santana	Santana, Kermode, Coster	3:52
8.	"Flame - Sky"	Instrumental	Doug Rauch, Santana, John McLaughlin	11:33
9.	"Welcome"	Instrumental	John Coltrane	6:35

2003 remastered CD edition bonus track
No.	Title	Writer(s)	Length
10.	"Mantra"	Santana, Shrieve, Coster	6:11

== Personnel ==
=== Band members ===
- Carlos Santana – electric guitar (2–5, 7–9), acoustic guitar (2), bass guitar (6), kalimba (6), percussion (1, 7), vocals (2), producer
- Tom Coster – Yamaha organ (1, 4, 6, 8), Hammond organ (2, 4, 5), electric piano (3, 7), acoustic piano (6, 8, 9), organ (7), marimba (6), percussion (3), strings arrangements (7), producer
- Richard Kermode – Hammond organ (1, 3, 8), mellotron (1), electric piano (2, 4–7, 9), acoustic piano (5), marimba (4), shekere (4, 6), percussion (3)
- Douglas Rauch – bass guitar (1–5, 7–9)
- Michael Shrieve – drums (1, 2, 4–8), producer
- José "Chepito" Areas – percussion (3, 9), congas (3), timbales (2, 3, 6, 7)
- Armando Peraza – percussion (1, 3, 9) congas (2, 4–8), bongos (4), cabasa (5)
- Leon Thomas – lead vocals (2, 4, 7), whistling (5)

=== Additional musicians ===
- Alice Coltrane – piano (1, 9), organ and Farfisa organ (1), arrangement (1, 7)
- Wendy Haas – vocals (2, 4)
- Flora Purim – lead vocals (5)
- John McLaughlin – guitar (8)
- Joe Farrell – solo flute (4)
- Bob Yance – flute (4, 5)
- Mel Martin – flute (4, 5)
- Douglas Rodriguez – rhythm guitar (4)
- Tony Smith – drums (3)
- Jules Broussard – soprano saxophone (6)
- Greg Adams – strings arrangements (7)

=== Production ===
- Glen Kolotkin – engineer
- Bob Irwin – 2003 CD reissue producer

== Charts ==
Chart performance for Welcome
Chart (1973–1974)	Peak position
Australian Albums (Kent Music Report)	19
Austrian Albums (Ö3 Austria)	9
Canada Top Albums/CDs (RPM)	24
German Albums (Offizielle Top 100)	29
Italian Albums (Musica e Dischi)	4
Japanese Albums (Oricon)	11
UK Albums (Official Charts)	8
US Billboard 200	25

== Certifications ==
Certifications for Welcome
Region	Certification	Certified units/sales
Canada (Music Canada)	Gold	50,000^{^}
United Kingdom (BPI)	Silver	60,000^{^}
United States (RIAA)	Gold	500,000^{^}
^{^} Shipments figures based on certification alone.
