= Orix Theater =

Concert hall in Nishi-ku, Osaka, Japan

Coordinates: 34°40′42.4″N 135°29′43.5″E

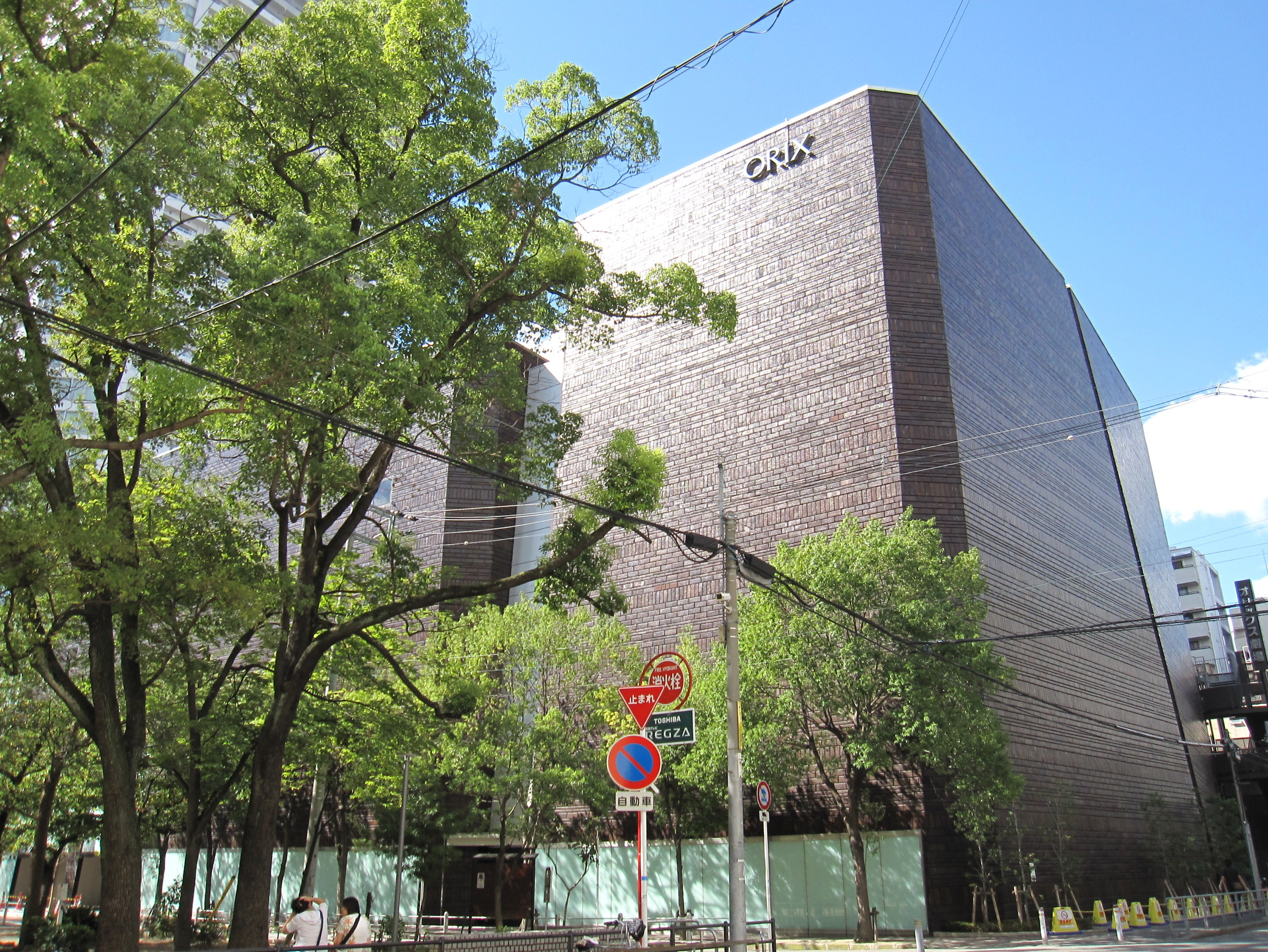
Orix Theater in 2014

The Orix Theater (Japanese: オリックス劇場, Hepburn: Orikkusu Gekijō), formerly the Osaka Kōsei Nenkin Kaikan (大阪厚生年金会館) (lit. Osaka Welfare Pension Hall), is a 2,400-seat concert hall in Nishi-ku, Osaka, Japan. Artists that performed in the main hall include Black Sabbath, Kiss, Pink Floyd, Deep Purple, Whitesnake, Robin Trower, Rainbow, Queen, Santana, The Jackson 5, James Brown, UFO, Iron Maiden, Red Velvet, Amalia Rodrigues, NCT 127, and Jun. K.

Osaka Kōsei Nenkin Kaikan officially opened on 14 April 1968 and was the largest concert hall in Osaka at the time. The complex also included a smaller hall, lodging facilities and two restaurants. The facility was sold in October 2009 to Orix Real Estate, who currently run it under the name the Orix Theater. After it closed in March 2010, Orix demolished all but the main building, which retains the Bizen ware tiles, was seismically reinforced, and saw solar panels installed on the roof, and reopened the venue on 8 April 2012.
