= José Areas =

Nicaraguan percussionist (born 1946)

José “Chepito” Areas
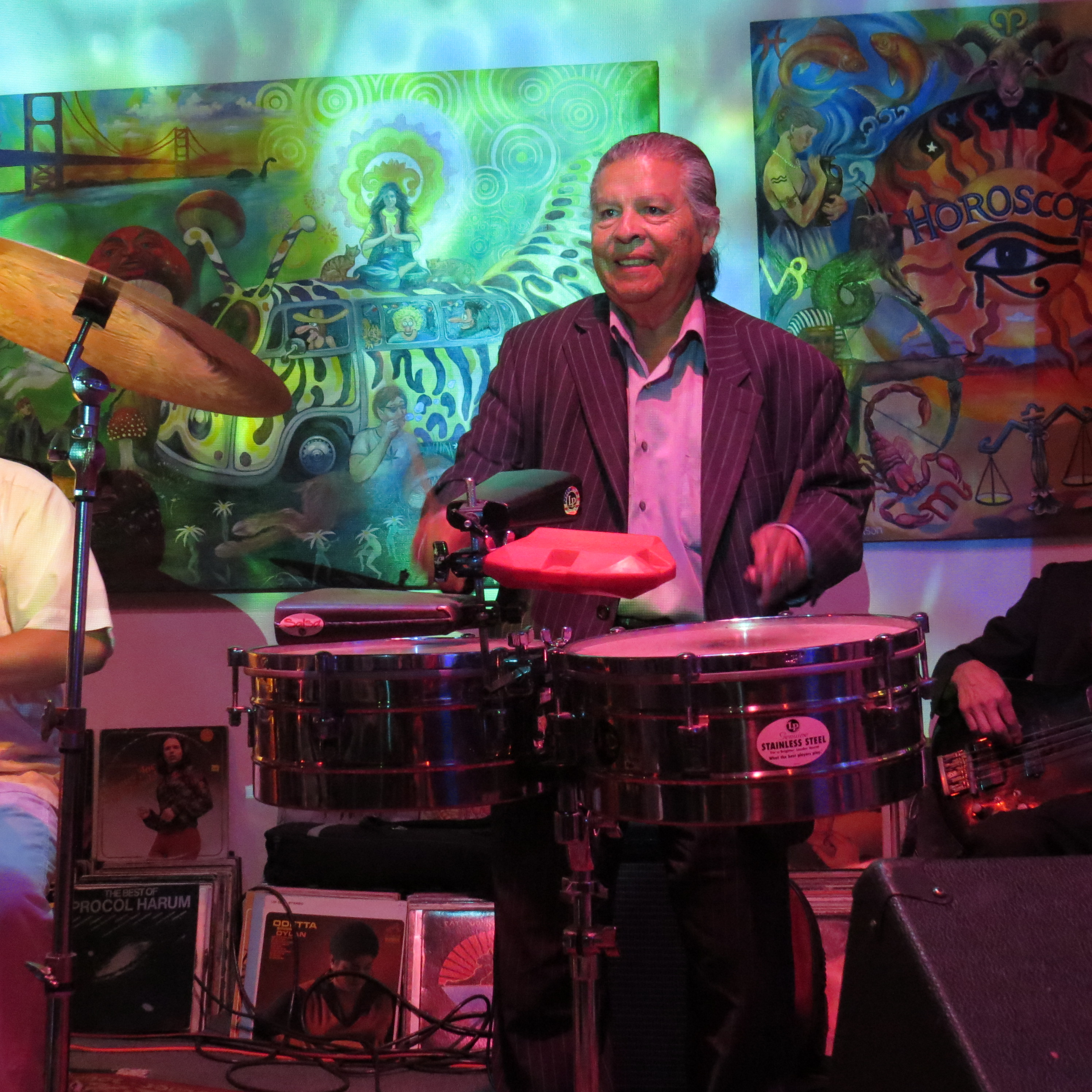

Background information
- Also known as: Chepito Areas
- Born: José Octavio Areas Dávila; 25 July 1946 (age 79); León, Nicaragua
- Origin: León, Nicaragua
- Genres: Latin rock; funk rock; jazz fusion
- Occupation: Musician
- Instruments: Percussion; trumpet; drums
- Years active: 1969-present
- Label: Columbia World Rock Records
- Formerly of: Santana

José Octavio "Chepito" Areas Dávila (born 25 July 1946) is a Nicaraguan percussionist best known for having played timbales and Conga drums in the Latin rock group Santana in 1969–1977 and 1987–1989.

== Santana ==
Areas joined Santana in 1969.

In 1998, he was inducted into the Rock & Roll Hall of Fame for his work in Santana. In 1997, he performed on Abraxas Pool with other members of the early 1970s iteration of Santana, including Gregg Rolie, Neal Schon, Michael Carabello and Michael Shrieve. Previously, he released an eponymous solo album on Columbia/CBS Records in 1974. La Gigantona, a 1976 collaboration with Nicaraguan singer-songwriter and childhood friend Alfonso Noel Lovo, was reissued by Numero Group in 2012. He was featured along with Richard Bean and Rich Aldana in 2003 CD The Sounds of Santana by "The Tellstars", and he played alongside Michael Shrieve and Rich Aldana in the 2007 CD "Cha Cha Time" by "The Tellstars". Jose Chepito Areas, was the featured artist on, Ray Cepeda’ “The Neo Maya Experience”, 2000, “Solo”, 2012, “Angels over Avalon & Aztlan 2008, Areas of Santaana, 2018, “Areas 51: Return of the Alien” 2019, Ray Cepeda, released on World Rock Records.

== Discography ==
=== with Santana ===
- Santana (1969)
- Abraxas (1970)
- Santana III (1971)
- Caravanserai (1972)
- Welcome (1973)
- Lotus (1974)
- Borboletta (1974)
- Festivál (1977)
- Moonflower (1977)

=== with Abraxas Pool ===
- Abraxas Pool (1997)

=== Other albums ===
- The Aliens! (1965)
- Feel It! (1970)
- Sisyphus (1970)
- Mwandishi (1971)
- Shake Off the Demon (1971)
- Choice Quality Stuff/Anytime (1971)
- Boz Scaggs & Band (1971)
- Danny Cox (1971)
- For Those Who Chant (1972)
- Brenda Patterson (1973)
- Crackin' (1975)
- Foolish Pleasures (1975)
- Chameleon (1976)
- La Gigantona (1976)
- Formerly Of The Harlettes (1978)
- Tropico (1978)
- Giants (1978)
- Passion And Fire (1984)
- The Healer (1989)
- Beyond the Thunder (1995)
- Ray Cepeda, "SOLO" (2012)
- The Sounds of Santana CD by Mike Roman & The Tellstars (2003)
- Ray Cepeda, “El Matrimonio del Sol y Luna” 2004
- Cha Cha Time! CD by Mike Roman & The Tellstars (2007)
- Bossa n' Ramones (2008)
- Ray Cepeda, "Angels over Avalon and Aztlan" (2008)
- We Back! (2013)
- Ray Cepeda, “Areas Of Santaana” (2018)
- Ray Cepeda “Areas 51 Return of the Alien “ 2019
