= Salvador Santana =

American singer-songwriter and spoken word artist (born 1983)

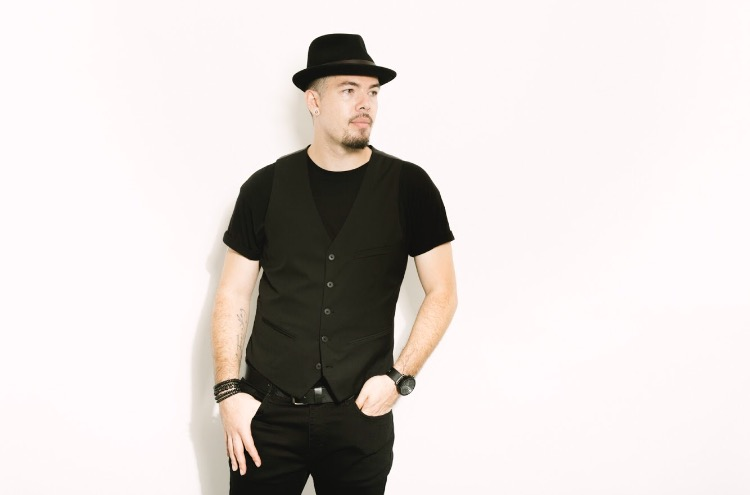
- Salvador Santana

Background information
- Genres: Rock, Electronic Music, Hip hop
- Occupations: Singer, spoken word artist, songwriter, and composer
- Instrument: Electronic keyboard • piano • vocals
- Years active: 1999–present
- Label: Various Business
- Website: salvadorsantana.com

Salvador Santana is a singer, spoken word artist, songwriter, and composer. His main instruments are the electronic keyboard and piano.

== Early life and education ==
Salvador Santana is the son of guitarist Carlos Santana and poet/author/activist Deborah Santana. His maternal grandfather, Saunders King, is an icon of American blues and his paternal grandfather, Jose Santana, is a violinist and mariachi bandleader.

Santana began playing piano at the age of five. He was instructed by Marcia Miget. He later went on to study music at Ruth Asawa San Francisco School of the Arts High School. He took up playing percussion and found a niche with the tympani drum. He also played piano in the school's award-winning jazz band.

In 1999, Santana collaborated with his father on composing the Grammy winning track "El Farol" on the album Supernatural.

Santana majored in Musical Arts at California Institute of the Arts in Santa Clarita, California. It was there that he met his wife, Megan.

== Career ==
=== Salvador Santana Band (2004–2008) ===
In 2004, Salvador established the Salvador Santana Band. Members of the group were Emerson Cardenas (bass), Quincy McCrary (vocals, keyboards), Woody Aplanalp (guitar), Tony Austin (drums) and José Espinoza (sax, percussion, vocals). With them Salvador played a fresh musical style incorporating elements of hip hop and jazz. His musical roots stem from a firsthand education from his grandfathers, Saunders King and Jose Santana, his father, Carlos, as well as the music of jazz artists John Coltrane, Herbie Hancock, Thelonious Monk, and Oscar Peterson, with influences from contemporary hip-hop acts like Atmosphere, Ozomatli.

=== Keyboard City (2008–2010) ===
In 2009 Salvador entered the studio to record his second major studio album / first solo album Keyboard City. He enlisted underground legends Del the Funky Homosapien, Money Mark (Beastie Boys), and GZA to help him with the album's production.

Keyboard City was built on what Salvador called "a mix of my favorite music, the best of what’s impacted my life, all coming together in a new way." Salvador first masterminded the direction for the album after a 2008 Remixes project where Del the Funky Homosapien was commissioned to remix the SSB song "Hella Tight". The synergy between Salvador and Del, along with the eclectic and fresh sound of the Remixes project was the inspiration for the new musical direction in the studio for his sophomore release.

In late fall 2009 a series of remix MP3s of the album's title track "Keyboard City" were released on the internet. These remixes were performed by internet DJs, The Hood Internet as well as indie electronic musician Dan Deacon, both remixes featured vocals by GZA. These remix MP3s were wildly popular, appearing on tastemaker music sites such as Brooklyn Vegan, Pitchfork Media, and My Old Kentucky Blog.

Keyboard City was released on February 2, 2010 via Quannum Projects. Keyboard Magazine declared that "Funkadelic and the Meters had a love child who was then raised by Esquivel in a space age bachelor pad full of analog synths." The magazine also stated, "On December 31, 2019, Keyboard City may well be remembered as one of the standout neo-funk records of the decade." Allmusic.com gave the album 3.5 out of 5 stars and Spin Magazine gave the album 3 out of 5 stars.

=== 2011–2014 ===
Salvador and his bands have graced stages from the Montreux Jazz Festival, the Bonaroo Music and Arts Festival, the High Sierra Festival, South by Southwest and the New Orleans Jazz Festival. Salvador has participated in projects outside of his own solo aspirations, such as the Hymns for Peace DVD released in 2004 as well as his father Carlos Santana's 2013 Corazón Live in Guadalajara DVD.

In 2013 Salvador released Rise Up, a six song EP. Songs "Mi Tesoro," "Into The Light," and "Rise Up" have a power and breadth of sound. "Ain't Enough" It's On" and "Gimme Your Best" round out the EP with upbeat tempos. "Rise Up" is featured on the award-winning film, School of My Dreams, a documentary film about the Daraja Academy in Kenya, a free all-girls secondary school. It was a trip to South Africa in 2006 with Artists for a New South Africa (ANSA), and meeting President Nelson Mandela, that triggered Salvador to write the positive message and music of "Rise Up."

For the keyboardist, making music is never about personal glory, but about lifting people up with humility, love, and positivity on a daily basis. "The main ingredient to my inspiration and creative drive is joy. I want to use music in a positive way and give back to people in need. There can never be enough people who do that."

In 2014, Salvador was invited by producer Gerry Gallagher to record with Latin rock legends El Chicano as well as Alphonse Mouzon, Brian Auger, Vikki Carr, Alex Ligertwood, Ray Parker Jr., Lenny Castro, Vikki Carr, Siedah Garrett, Walfredo Reyes Jr., Pete Escovedo, Peter Michael Escovedo, Marcos J. Reyes, Jessy J and David Paich and is featured on keyboards on Gallagher written, arranged and composed "melodic rap" song called "Sunday Kind Of Mood" which is part of Gallagher's most recent studio album due out in 2019.

=== 2015–present ===
In August 2015, Santana released his first full-length album, Fantasy Reality, and was a featured guest on his father Carlos Santana's Corazon tour.

Santana's politically-charged 2019 album with fellow musician Asdrubal "Asdru" Sierra of the band Ozomatli, is entitled RMXKNZ. Santana described the album as "a love letter to L.A., Latinx culture and what we call La Resistencia, the Resistance."
