= Artists for a New South Africa =

Charitable organization based in the US

Artists for a New South Africa (ANSA), founded as Artists for a Free South Africa (AFSA) in 1989, was a charitable organization based in Los Angeles, California. Founded by a group of Hollywood actors and other creatives, it started out as an awareness-raising and anti-apartheid advocacy organization, before changed its name and focus in 1994 when the first democratic elections were held in South Africa. It turned to fundraising and providing healthcare for children and others affected by the HIV/AIDS epidemic in South Africa. It wound up around the time of the death of Nelson Mandela at the end of 2013.

In 2003, the Amandla AIDS Fund (AAF) was established by ANSA, with a $2.5 million donation from Carlos and Deborah Santana.

== History ==
Artists for a Free South Africa AFSA was founded in 1989 in Los Angeles by the American actors Alfre Woodard, Danny Glover, Blair Underwood, CCH Pounder, Mary Steenburgen, Robert and Donna Brown Guillaume, and writer Roderick Spencer (husband of Woodard), along with other creatives. AFSA was created in response to calls by South African anti-apartheid leaders for increased support from the international community, as well as American and South African grassroots supporters and organizers, realizing how public attention could be galvanized by artists and the arts. ANSA encouraged the entertainment industry to increase pressure on the apartheid government of South Africa by means of cultural boycotts, economic sanctions, and international campaigns.

AFSA put on events and programs to educate people about the apartheid regime and its effect on Black South Africans, and organized and supported national and international campaigns. AFSA members gave press conferences, wrote op-eds, lobbied, and joined protests to advocate for the release of political prisoners and the protection of human rights in South Africa, raising public awareness and support. In 1990, after Nelson Mandela was released from prison and went on his first U.S. tour, AFSA co-coordinated a Los Angeles fundraising dinner for the Nelson Mandela Freedom Fund.

In 1994, after South Africa's first democratic election, the organization was renamed Artists for a New South Africa (ANSA). Its focus changed to providing healthcare and support for HIV/AIDS orphans and other vulnerable children in South Africa.

In 2003, the Amandla AIDS Fund (AAF) was established by ANSA, with a $2.5 million donation from Carlos and Deborah Santana, which represented the entire net proceeds of the 2003 U.S. Summer Santana Shaman tour. Former anti-apartheid activist, and later politician in the new South Africa, Barbara Hogan, became a member of the advisory board of the AAF.

From 2005, ANSA provided ongoing comprehensive care and services to thousands of children in South Africa. The board decided in 2012 to start winding down operations, closing its external offices in July 2013. It worked on preserving records of the history of the anti-apartheid movement and its leaders, as well as maintaining an archive of ANSA's history.

For Nelson Mandela's 95th birthday (18 July 2013), the organization provided historic photos and footage, interviewed key representatives and supporters, including Jurnee Smollett and Harry Belafonte, to produce a documentary film Mandela: Freedom's Father, which aired on US cable network Black Entertainment Television (BET) on his birthday. As his death approached (December 2013), ANSA responded to media requests for information and interviews from many outlets, including CNN, NPR, BET, Al Jazeera America, the South African Broadcasting Corporation, and others.

ANSA arranged an interview with Bishop Desmond Tutu for, and narration by, Alfre Woodard (who also served as co-executive producer) for the Peabody Award-winning documentary Soft Vengeance: Albie Sachs and the New South Africa. The film, directed by Abby Ginzberg and released in 2014, was about anti-apartheid activist Albie Sachs, who lost an arm in an assassination attempt in 1988. ANSA continued to provide news and information about South Africa, HIV/AIDS, and various social justice issues.

ANSA worked with the Ahmed Kathrada Foundation to create a new work about Ahmed Kathrada and Robben Island. In 2009 it produced an audiobook titled Nelson Mandela's Favorite African Folktales, featuring the voices of Hugh Jackman, Helen Mirren, Desmond Tutu, Alan Rickman, Scarlett Johansson, Whoopi Goldberg, Charlize Theron, Matt Damon, and many others, to raise funds for AIDS orphans as well as educating listeners worldwide about African culture. All proceeds raised from the initial release of the audiobook were donated to the Nelson Mandela Children's Fund and the AIDS Foundation of South Africa.
