= Oneness (Carlos Santana album) =

1979 album by Carlos Santana

Oneness: Silver Dreams - Golden Reality

Studio album / Live album by Devadip Carlos Santana
- Released: March 1979
- Recorded: December 1977–1978
- Studios: A1–A6 recorded live at Osaka Kōsei Nenkin Kaikan in Osaka, Japan; A7–B6 recorded at the Automatt in San Francisco, California
- Genres: Jazz fusion; psychedelic rock; Latin jazz; Latin rock; R&B
- Length: 45:55
- Label: Columbia
- Producer: Devadip Carlos Santana

Devadip Carlos Santana chronology
Inner Secrets (1978)	Oneness: Silver Dreams - Golden Reality (1979)	Marathon (1979)

Oneness: Silver Dreams - Golden Reality is a 1979 album by Carlos Santana. It was his second of three albums (the others being Illuminations and The Swing of Delight) to be released under his temporary Sanskrit name Devadip Carlos Santana, given to him by Sri Chinmoy. The album, which consists mostly of instrumental songs and ballads, features members of the band Santana, as well as Carlos Santana's first wife Deborah and father-in-law Saunders King. According to Santana, Oneness was influenced by Weather Report's album Mysterious Traveller. The track "Transformation Day" is an adaptation of part of Alan Hovhaness's symphonic work Mysterious Mountain.

== Reception ==
Professional ratings
Review scores
Source	Rating
AllMusic	3/5 stars
Christgau's Record Guide	B−
The Encyclopedia of Popular Music	2/5 stars
Music Week	4/4 stars
The Rolling Stone Album Guide	3/5 stars

A writer for Billboard noted Santana's "extraordinary guitar work," and called the album "a musical excursion into various moods and feelings." Critic Robert Christgau described the album as "frustrating," calling it "spiritual program music that mixes genuinely celestial rock with the usual goop." The Bay State Banner opined that, "at this point, Santana would be well-advised to rid himself of Greg Walker's vocals, which are empty and corny." The New York Times noted that "too much of the time is spent wallowing in benign platitudes."

In a review for AllMusic, William Ruhlmann noted that "the difference between a group effort and a solo work seems to be primarily in the musical approach, which is more esoteric, and more varied than on a regular band album." Rob Caldwell of All About Jazz stated that "though this was essentially [Santana's] first solo record, it marked the work as a definite remove from any 'Santana sound'." He wrote: "Oneness is much more accessible than Illuminations and more likely to appeal to fans of the band. Gone are the lengthy and often meandering tracks..., and Santana explores many avenues of expression."

Musicologist Melinda Latour described the title track as "a particularly clear example of Santana's attempt to transcend to another plane through tone," in which he "builds a sense of spatial transcendence," leading to "an explosion of upper partials that carry the end of a note upward into a new dimension."

== Track listing ==
All tracks written by Carlos Santana, except where noted.

Side One
No.	Title	Writer(s)	Length
1.	"The Chosen Hour"		0:36
2.	"Arise Awake"		2:05
3.	"Light Versus Darkness"		0:48
4.	"Jim Jeannie"	Chico Hamilton	3:30
5.	"Transformation Day"	Alan Hovhaness, Santana	3:45
6.	"Victory"		1:10
7.	"Silver Dreams Golden Smiles"	Tom Coster, Santana, Greg Walker	4:09
8.	"Cry of the Wilderness"		3:11
9.	"Guru's Song"	Sri Chinmoy	3:06
Total length:			22:15

Side Two
No.	Title	Writer(s)	Length
1.	"Oneness"		6:21
2.	"Life Is Just a Passing Parade"		5:15
3.	"Golden Dawn"		2:17
4.	"Free as the Morning Sun"		3:16
5.	"I Am Free"	Sri Chinmoy, Santana	1:27
6.	"Song for Devadip"	Narada Michael Walden	5:03
Total length:			23:37

== Personnel ==
- Greg Walker – vocals (1, 11, 13)
- Deborah Santana – vocals (14)
- Carlos Santana – electric guitar, vocals
- Chris Solberg – guitar (5,11), Hammond organ (5, 11)
- Saunders King – guitar, vocals (7)
- Tom Coster – keyboards, vocals
- Narada Michael Walden – piano, Hammond organ (9, 15)
- Bob Levy – strings, synthesizer (6)
- Chris Rhyne – keyboards (11)
- David Margen – bass guitar
- Graham Lear – drums
- Pete Escovedo – timbales (6)
- Armando Peraza – percussion, vocals
- Clare Fischer – string arrangements and conductor; piano (7, 12)

== Charts ==
Chart (1979)	Peak position
Australian Albums (Kent Music Report)	39
Finnish Albums (The Official Finnish Charts)	25
UK Albums (Official Charts)	55
US Billboard 200	87
