= Abby Ginzberg =

Film director and producer

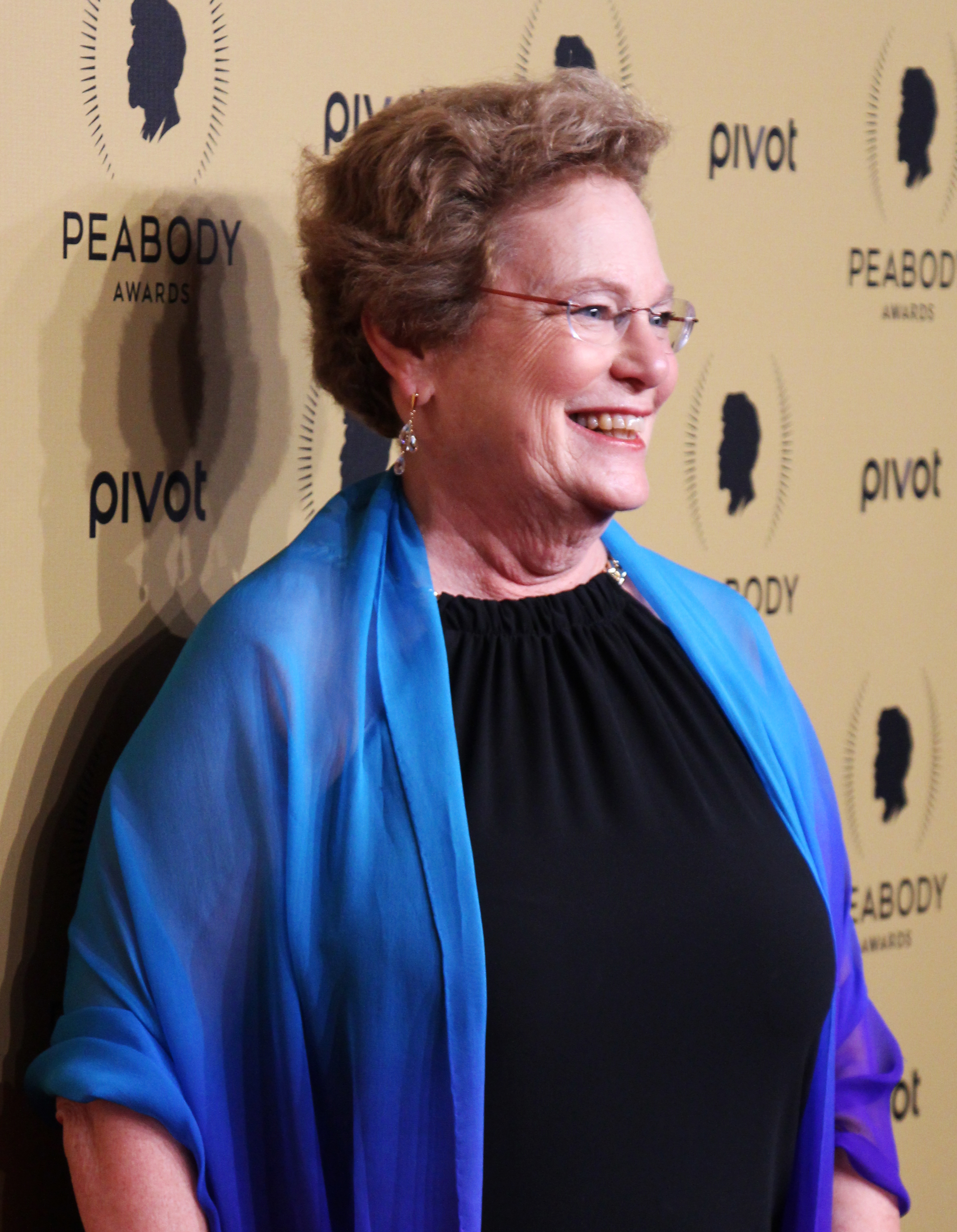
- Ginzberg at the 74th Annual Peabody Awards
- Occupation: Filmmaker
- Website: abbyginzberg.com

Abby Ginzberg is an American independent documentary film director and producer and founder of Ginzberg Productions. Since starting to make films in 1983, she has made many films about discrimination and the legal profession.

== Early life and education ==
Abby Ginzberg graduated from UC Hastings College of the Law in San Francisco, California, in 1975.

== Career ==
=== Academia ===
Ginzberg taught at UC Berkeley School of Law from 1975 to 1976, and at New College of California School of Law from 1981 to 1985.

=== Filmmaking ===
Ginzberg started producing and directing films in 1983.

In 2005, Ginzberg released the documentary Soul of Justice: Thelton Henderson’s American Journey, which profiled federal district judge Thelton Henderson. Another film released in 2005, A Tale of Two Cities, discusses the difficulty of forming high-school education for disadvantaged juvenile youths. Her 2003 film, Doing Justice: The Life and Trials of Arthur Kinoy, Doing Justice: The Life and Trials of Arthur Kinoy won numerous awards, including Best of Festival at Vermont International Film Festival, a CINE Golden Eagle, an ABA Silver Gavel. It was screened at the Museum of Modern Art in New York, at the Oakland Museum of California and the Film Arts Festival, and was also aired on public television, Free Speech TV, and Democracy Now!, and internationally in Australia and the United Kingdom.

She also directed the Peabody Award-winning film, Soft Vengeance: Albie Sachs and the New South Africa. The documentary, which was executive produced by the Ford Foundation, Alfre Woodard (who also narrated), and Deborah Santana, chronicled the life of anti-apartheid freedom fighter and former Constitutional Court judge Albie Sachs, who lost an arm and an eye in an attack by the South African security services in Mozambique in 1988.

In 2015, Ginzberg collaborated with filmmaker Frank Dawson on Agents of Change, a documentary that profiles the black student movement on college campuses in the late 1960s that led to the creation of Ethnic studies departments at San Francisco State University and Cornell University.

Ginzberg is a member of Film Fatales women directors of independent film.

== Selected awards ==
- 2022: NAACP Image Award for Best Documentary (2022); Best Director, Harlem International Film Festival; Best Documentary, American Film Festival (Poland); for Barbara Lee:Speaking Truth to Power
- 2014: Peabody Award, for Soft Vengeance: Albie Sachs and the New South Africa
- 2006: Silver Gavel Award for Media and The Arts, for Soul of Justice: Thelton Henderson's American Journey
- 2006: CINE Golden Eagle, for Soul of Justice: Thelton Henderson's American Journey
- 2003: Best of Festival at Vermont International Film Festival; a CINE Golden Eagle; ABA Silver Gavel, for Doing Justice: The Life and Trials of Arthur Kinoy

== Selected filmography ==
- Everyday Heroes (Documentary, 2001) Director & Producer
- Soul of Justice: Thelton Henderson's American Journey (Documentary, 2005) Director & Producer
- Cruz Reynoso: Sowing the Seeds of Justice (2010) Director & Producer
- The Barber of Birmingham: Foot Soldier of the Civil Rights Movement (Documentary short, 2011) Consulting Producer
- Soft Vengeance: Albie Sachs and the New South Africa (Documentary, 2014) Director & Producer
- Agents of Change (Documentary, 2016) Co-director & Co-producer
- And Then They Came for Us (Documentary, 2017) Co-director & Producer
- Waging Change(Documentary,2019) Director and Producer
- Barbara Lee: Speaking Truth to Power (Documentary, 2020) Director & Producer
- American Justice on Trial (Documentary short, 2022) Co-Producer
