= Chicano Music Awards =

American music award

The Chicano Music Awards was an annual award event that honored Chicano musicians and raised money for college scholarships. It was held at the Pasadena Civic Auditorium. It was attended by as many as 3,000 people.

The event was held annually from 1989 through at least 2000.

It was founded by Daniel A. Castro, also known as "Sancho," long-time host of the "Sancho Show" on KPCC, the Pasadena City College radio station.

Artists who have received awards include Don Tosti, Freddy Fender, Linda Ronstadt, Flaco Jimenez, and Carlos Santana.

Proceeds of the event went to the Quetzalcoatl Memorial Scholarship Fund, also founded by Castro in honor of his son Quetzalcoatl, who died at the age of 8. The organization provides scholarships for Chicano and Latino college students.
