= V-Picks Guitar Picks =

Guitar pick company

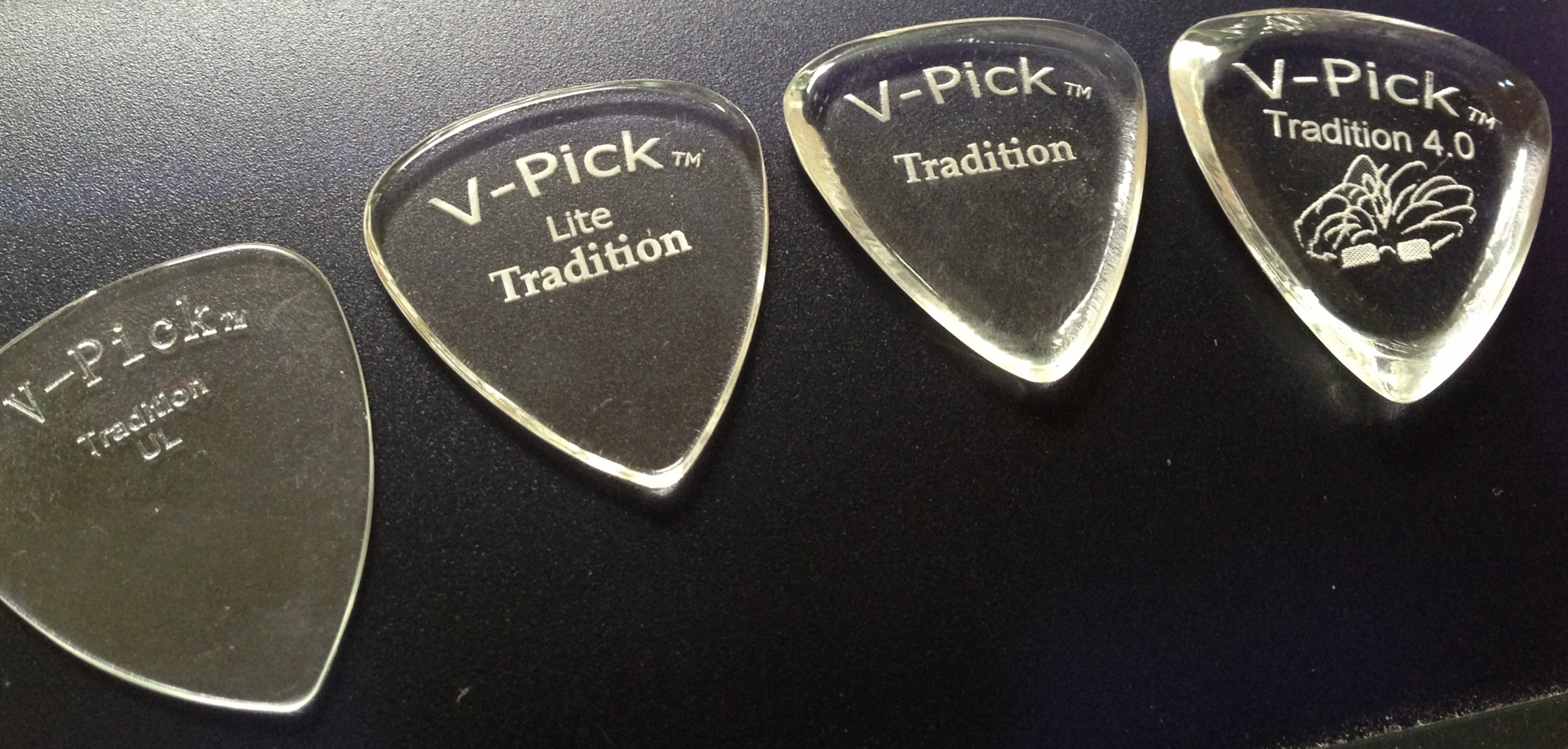

V-PICKS are hand made guitar picks created in 1980 by guitarist Vinni Smith. By design these guitar picks were unique, being the first picks to originate from cast acrylic. The pick was originally developed for more volume, better tone, fast playing action and beauty. Since its introduction, over 100 models have been designed. Picks available are applicable for electric and acoustic guitar, mandolin, bass guitar, dulcimer and an assortment of therapeutic picks for players with hand and arm injuries. In the early years they were named V-PICKS by friend and guitarist, John Dean. The company was started in 2004 and then incorporated in 2008. V-PICKS Headquarters was moved from California to Tennessee in 2011.

== Notable users ==
One of V-PICK's most recognizable endorsers is Carlos Santana. Other artists include Bill Decker, Billy Gibbons, Walter Becker, Phil Keaggy, Jorge Santana, Brad Whitford, Vernon Reid, Rick Vito, Gordon Kennedy, Derek St Holmes, Roger Fisher, Jimmy Herring, Johnny Hiland, Danny Kortchmar, SKY Dangcil, Andy Reiss, Stu Hamm and Billy Sheehan, Scott Van Zen, Neil Zaza & Joe Martinelli, CJ Whitehill.

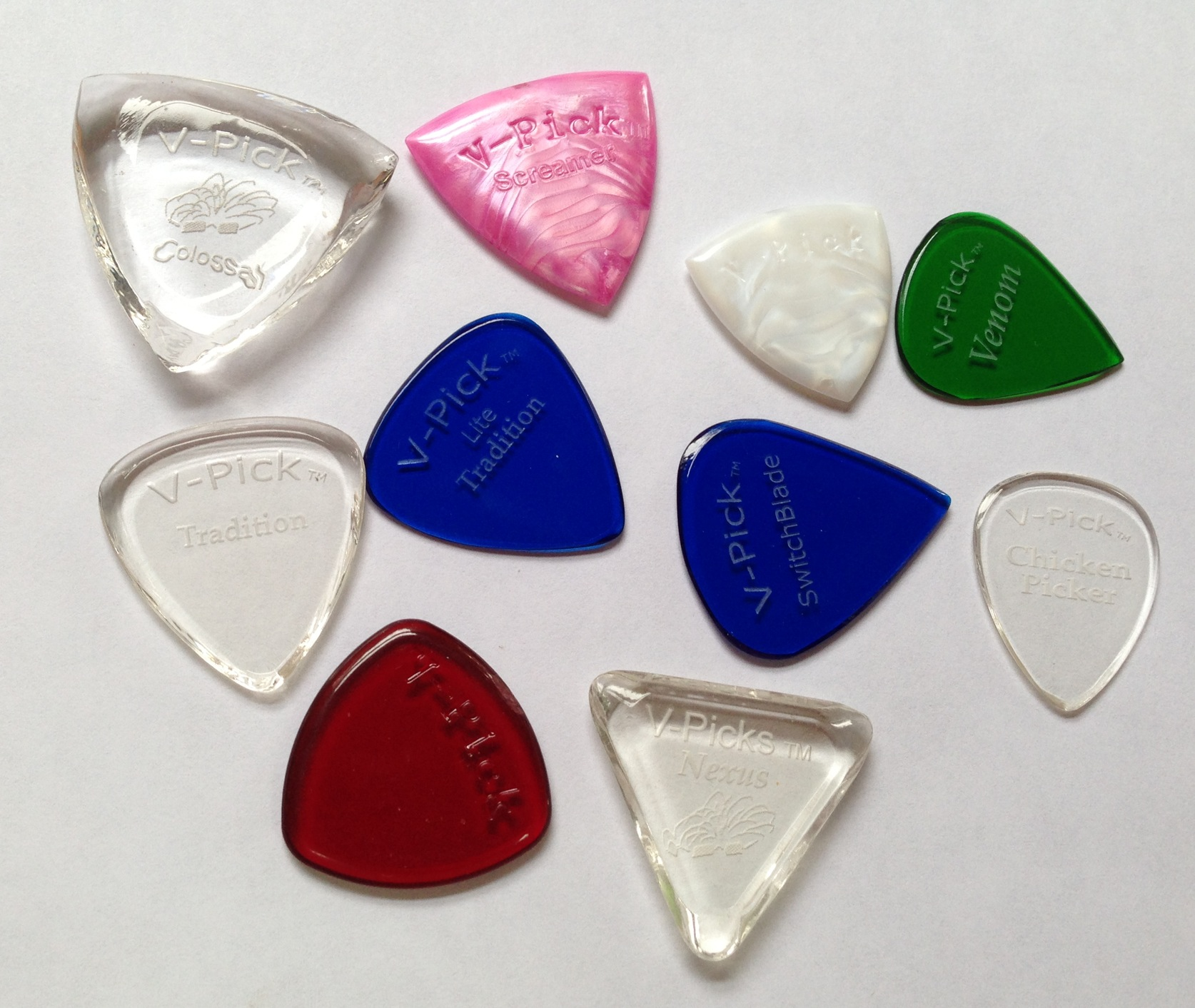

== Materials ==
Acrylic is the material used in crafting V-PICKS. A proprietary mixture of two different acrylics is used plus an inert material. The manufacturer states that materials and mixtures are chosen to render a strong, long wearing guitar pick that has a gripping quality which reacts to the temperature in the players fingertips. These acrylic picks are made in gauges ranging from .75mm to 11.85mm.

== Manufacturing ==
V-PICKS are made in Nashville, TN. The company produces over 100,000 hand made picks per year, and supplies guitar picks to 101 countries in the world. Some models are originally cut out by laser from sheets of cast acrylic. Others start as raw materials poured into molds. Both styles are then hand ground on a bench grinder and hand trimmed with a razor knife. This creates the bevel, feel, and sound of the pick. Next, they are tempered for strength with intense high heat, much like the process done on steel and glass. Then they are buffed with high heat flame for a smooth and slick playing edge and bevel.

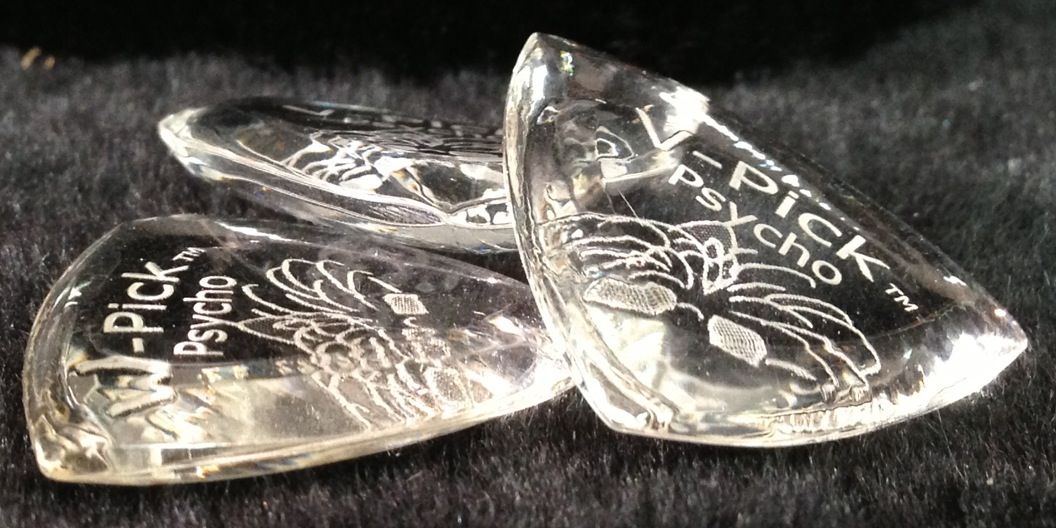
