= Saunders King =

American R&B and blues guitarist and singer (1909–2000)

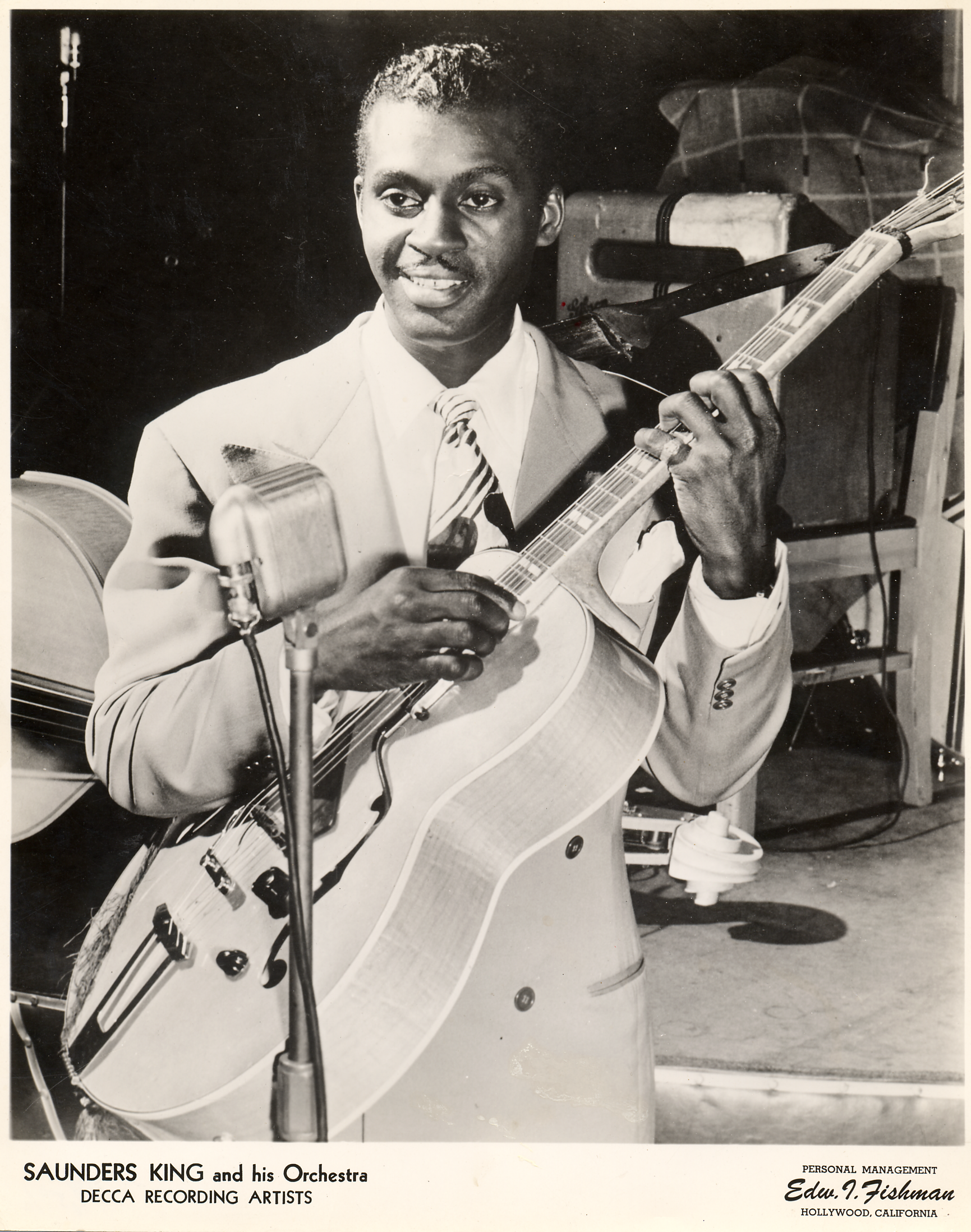

Background information
- Born: Saunders Samuel King; March 13, 1909; Caddo Parish, Louisiana, United States
- Died: August 31, 2000 (aged 91) San Rafael, California, U.S.
- Genres: Blues
- Occupations: Singer, guitarist, songwriter
- Instruments: Vocals, guitar
- Years active: 1938–1961, 1979
- Labels: Aladdin, Modern, Rhythm

Saunders Samuel King (March 13, 1909 – August 31, 2000) was an American R&B and blues guitarist and singer.

== Life and career ==
Saunders King was born in Staples, Caddo Parish, Louisiana. His parents, Bishop Judge L. King and Sarah Anasilistine King built a church in Louisiana before moving the family to Texas and then to Oroville, California. After building a church there, the family moved to Oakland, California and started Christ Holy Sanctified Church on 7th Street. As a youngster he learned to play piano, banjo and ukulele and sang in the church, but did not pick up guitar until 1938. At the end of the 1930s he sang with the Southern Harmony Four Gospel Quartet on NBC radio, and began playing the guitar in 1938. King released the tune "S.K. Blues" (originally titled "Saunders Blues") in 1942, which became a major nationwide hit. The tune featured electric blues guitar, one of the earliest recordings to do so.

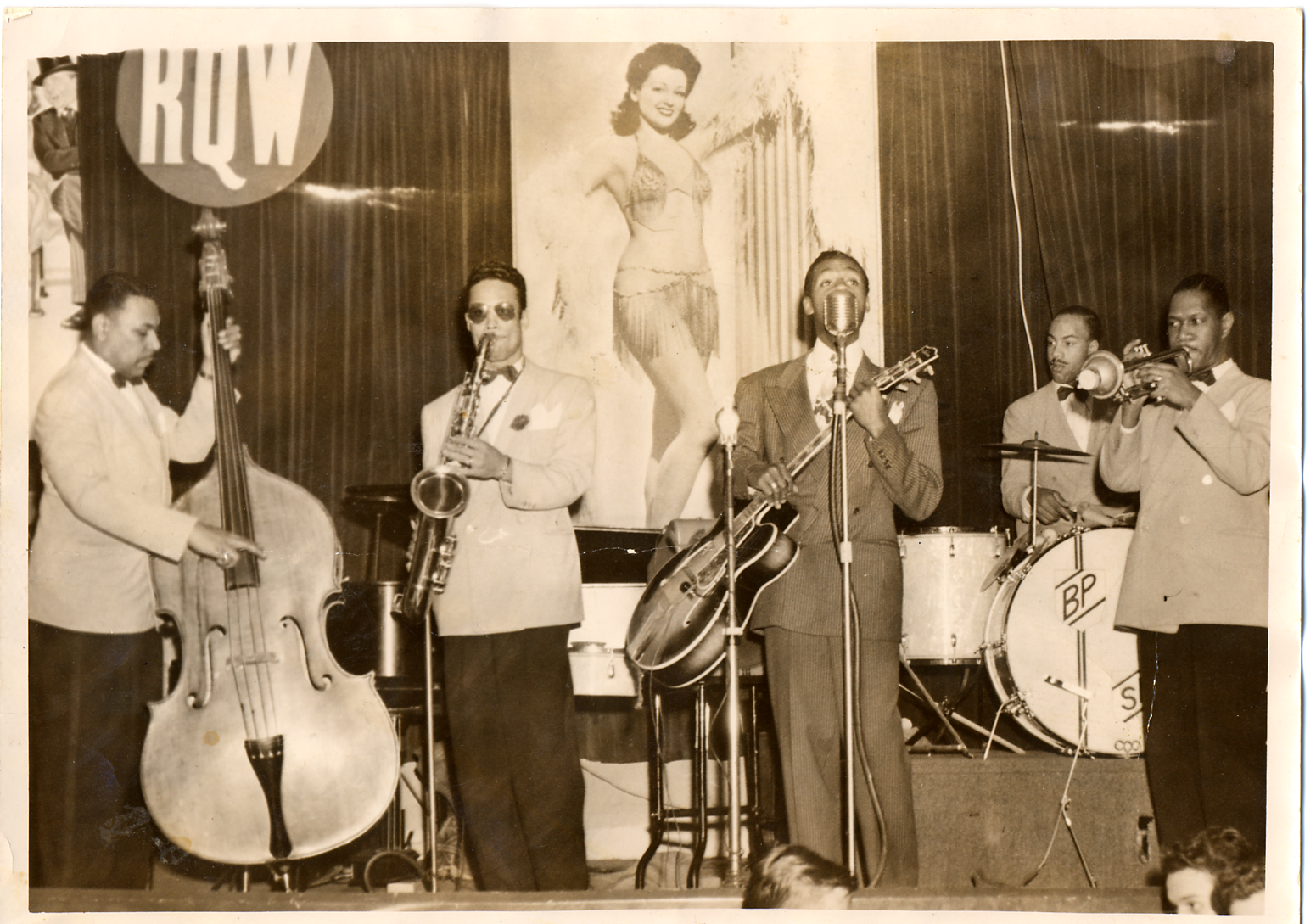
Saunders King and his Orchestra

The lyrics begin:

"Come here, pretty baby, and put your fine mellow body on my knee... I wanna whisper in your ear and tell you things keep worrying me." King was known for his smooth, velvety voice and flawless performances, whether with a sextet or trio. King's guitar of choice was a modified Gibson ES-300.

The track was later recorded by both Jimmy Witherspoon and Big Joe Turner.

King traveled to Chicago and performed at the Cafe Society. He met and married Jo Frances Willis in 1948. The couple had two daughters: Kitsaun Jo King and Deborah Sara King and raised them in San Francisco, California. King continued to perform at the Savoy, Club Alabam, Jack's on Sutter, on NBC Radio, and at the Geary Theater. He recorded for Aladdin Records, Modern Records, and Rhythm Records, and had two US Billboard R&B chart hits in 1949 with "Empty Bedroom Blues" (number 9) and "Stay Gone Blues" (number 14). He retired from active performance in 1961, devoting himself to his family and playing his guitar Sundays in the family church. In 1973, his daughter Deborah King married Carlos Santana, and, in 1979, King recorded with his son-in-law on the album Oneness.

King suffered a stroke in 1989. He and his wife Jo Frances lived in San Rafael and he died in August 2000 at age 91.
