= Deborah Santana =

American social justice activist (born 1951)

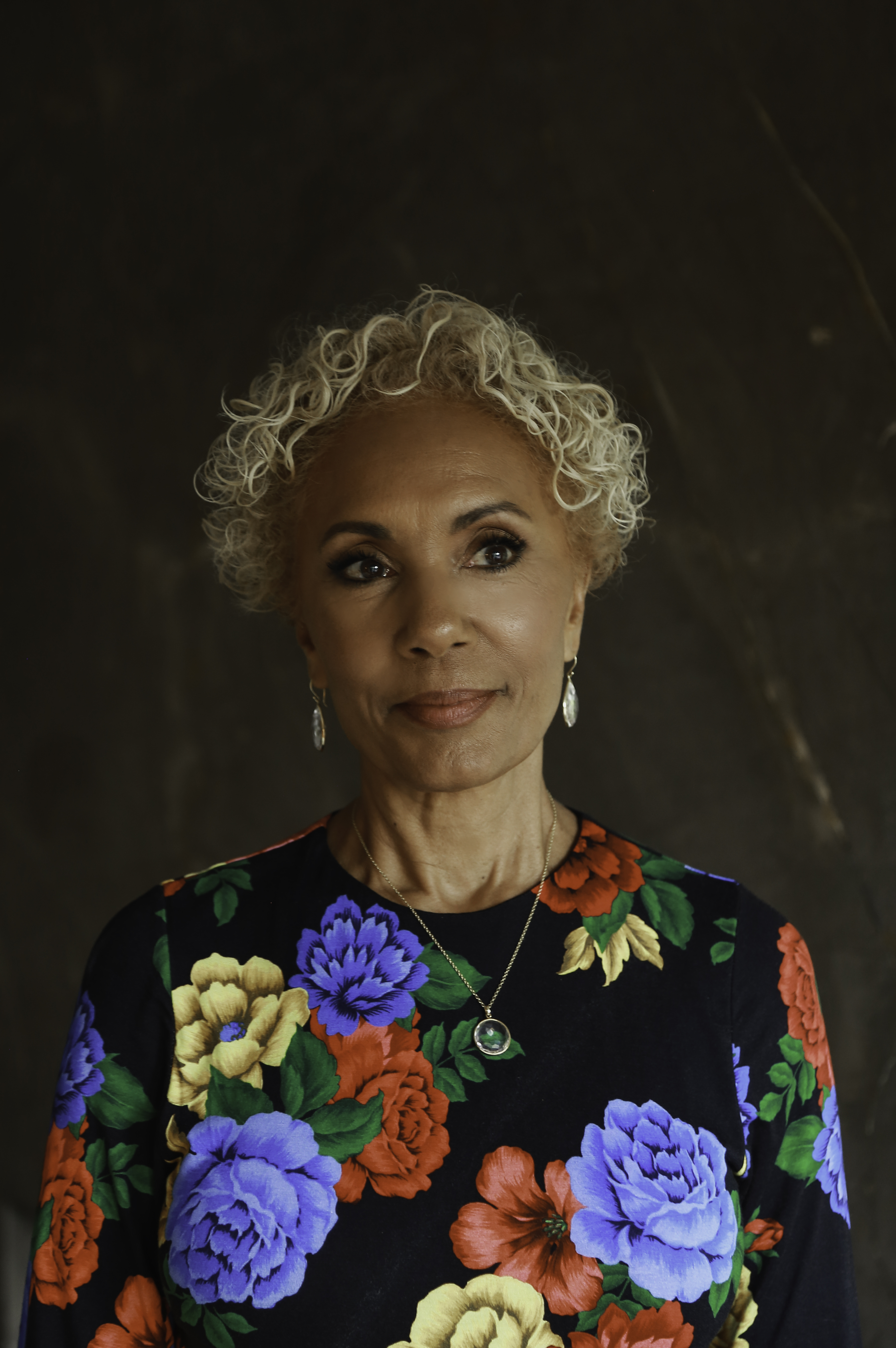
- Santana in 2019
- Born: Deborah Sara King; January 30, 1951 (age 75); San Francisco, California, United States
- Education: California Institute of Integral Studies (MA)
- Occupations: Author; Business Manager; Activist
- Spouses: Carlos Santana (m. 1973; div. 2007); Carl Lumbly (m. 2015; div. 2019)
- Children: 3; including Salvador Santana
- Father: Saunders King
- Website: deborahsantana.com

Deborah Sara Santana (née King) is a peace and social justice activist for women and people of color, business manager, and author. She is the former wife of musician Carlos Santana.

== Early life and education ==
Deborah Sara King is the daughter of the blues musician Saunders King and Jo Frances King (née Willis), a claims adjuster for the Social Security Administration. She was born in San Francisco, California, and has an older sister, Kitsaun King, born in 1949.

Santana graduated from the California Institute of Integral Studies and holds a Master of Arts in Philosophy and Religion with a concentration in Women's Spirituality.

== Career ==
From 1994 to 2007, Santana was vice-president and COO of Santana Management, which involved working in management of her husband's band.

=== Philanthropy ===
As a philanthropist, Santana founded Do a Little, a non-profit which seeks to empower children and underprivileged women, in 2008.

Santana has also served as a trustee for ANSA (Artists for a New South Africa). In 2003, the Amandla AIDS Fund (AAF) was established by ANSA, with a $2.5 million donation from Carlos and Deborah Santana, which represented the entire net proceeds of the 2003 U.S. Summer Santana Shaman tour.

She has also served as a trustee for the Smithsonian Institution. She is on the board of directors of the Violence Intervention program in Los Angeles and is a First Century Leader of the Smithsonian American Women's History Initiative, she is also a Member of the Smithsonian National Education Outreach Working Group for the Smithsonian Under Secretary for Education. Santana is also a founding donor of the Smithsonian National Museum of African American History and Culture.

In April 2026, Santana released a new memoir, "Loving the Fire: Choosing Me, Finding Freedom," a memoir chronicling her journey of personal transformation and spiritual awakening following the end of her 34-year marriage to musician Carlos Santana. Her previous memoir, Space Between the Stars: My Journey to an Open Heart, was published in 2005 while she was still married to Carlos. In 2018, Santana edited and co-published the anthology All the Women in My Family Sing: Women Write the World: Essays on Equality, Justice, and Freedom (Nothing But the Truth So Help Me God), a collection of poems and stories written by 69 women of color. She has also contributed to the anthologies Tutu As I Know Him: On a Personal Note (2006), Nothing But the Truth So Help Me God (2012), Life Moments for Women (2012), and 20 Years - Chokecherries Anniversary Edition (2013).

Santana is credited as a producer on five short documentary films focusing on the Daraja Academy, a free secondary boarding school for high performing girls in need in Kenya, and the work of non-profit partners in South Africa. Four of these films were directed by Emmy Award-winner Barbara Rick. Santana continues to support the Daraja Academy both financially and by using her celebrity to bring awareness.

Santana is a lead investor of the Courage Museum, opening in San Francisco in 2027. The Courage Museum is an educational program that will be a new platform for public education, inspiration, and action, a place where individuals are informed and equipped with tools to rethink violence and advance concrete change.

== Personal life ==
When leaving home to attend college in Los Angeles, King was in a relationship with musician Sly Stone from 1969 to 1972. Following their relocation to Los Angeles in late 1969, the relationship became increasingly volatile, involving severe domestic violence and substance abuse, including LSD and cocaine. During this period, her older sister, Kitsaun King, worked closely within Stone's inner circle, managing parts of his household and musical environment during the turbulent production of his 1971 album There's a Riot Goin' On. During her time in Southern California, King also completed a brief academic stint at California State University, Dominguez Hills where she originally intended to pursue studies in creative writing. After extricating herself from the relationship, King returned home to attend San Francisco State University, where she and Kitsaun later partnered to run a vegetarian restaurant for nearly a decade. In her 2005 memoir, Space Between the Stars, King detailed her close lifelong bond with Kitsaun, who would also go on to work extensively alongside her in publicity and marketing management for the Santana band.

Santana has three children with Carlos Santana, whom she married in 1973 and divorced in 2007. Salvador Santana is a songwriter, band leader, and instrumentalist; Stella Santana, a singer/songwriter/performer; and Angelica Santana, a writer, archivist, and film producer.

Santana married actor Carl Lumbly in 2015 and the couple divorced in 2019.
