= Journey discography =

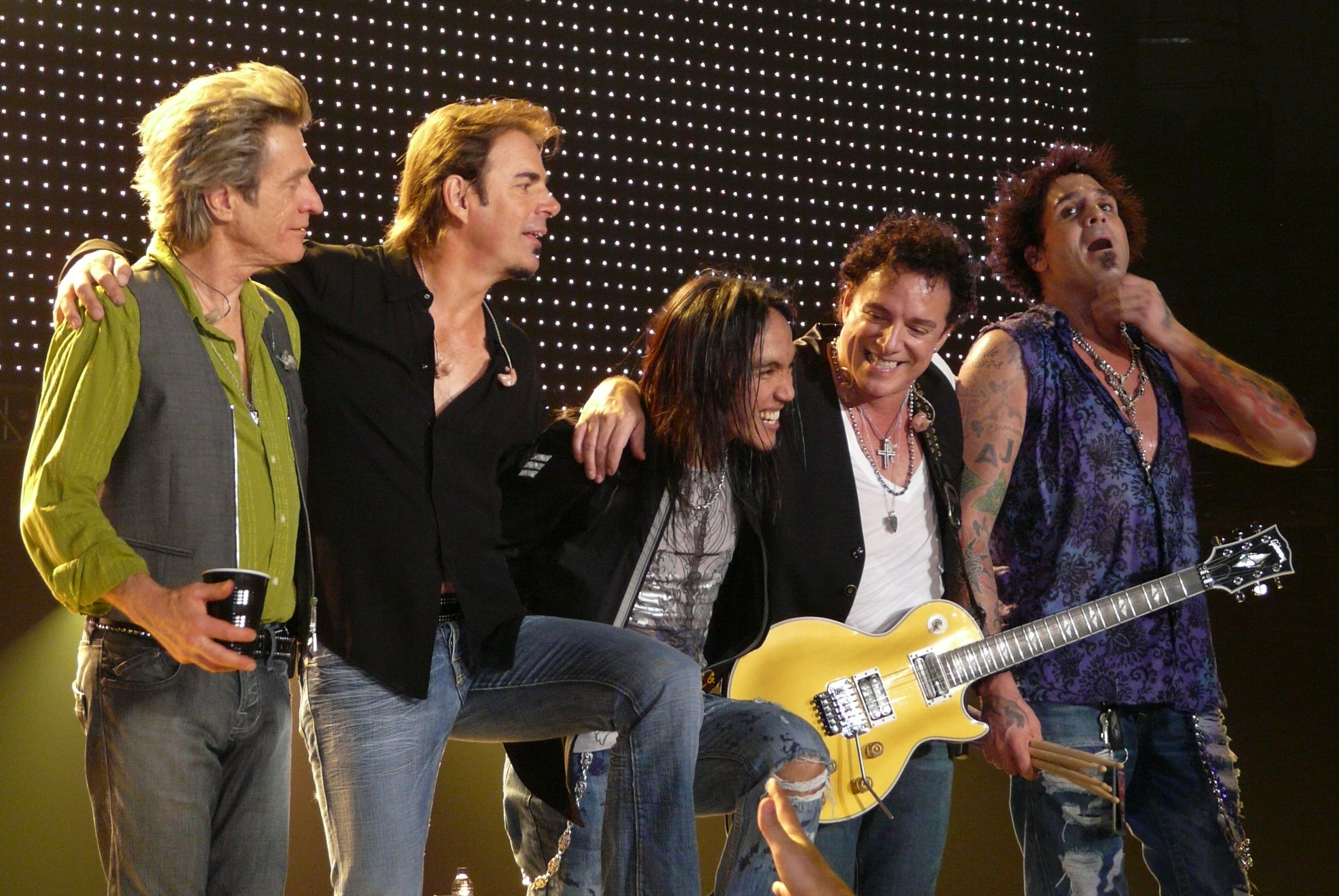
- Journey live in Minneapolis, Minnesota, in 2008
- Studio albums: 15
- Extended plays: 2
- Soundtrack albums: 1
- Live albums: 5
- Compilation albums: 11
- Singles: 52
- Video albums: 6
- Music videos: 30

American rock band Journey has released 15 studio albums, one soundtrack album, five live albums, 11 compilation albums, and 52 singles since 1975.

== Albums ==
=== Studio albums ===
List of albums, with selected chart positions, sales figures and certifications
Title	Album details	Peak chart positions									Certifications
Title	Album details	US	CAN	GER	NL	NOR	JPN	SWE	SWI	UK	Certifications
Journey	Released: April 1, 1975; Label: Columbia; Formats: LP, cassette, CD	138	—	—	—	—	72	—	—	—	
Look into the Future	Released: January 1976; Label: Columbia; Formats: LP, cassette, CD	100	—	—	—	—	58	—	—	—	
Next	Released: February 9, 1977; Label: Columbia; Formats: LP, cassette, CD	85	—	—	—	—	—	47	—	—	
Infinity	Released: January 30, 1978; Label: Columbia; Formats: LP, cassette, CD	21	22	—	—	—	—	37	—	—	US: 3× Platinum; CAN: Gold
Evolution	Released: March 20, 1979; Label: Columbia; Formats: LP, cassette, CD	20	37	—	—	—	70	36	—	100	US: 3× Platinum; CAN: Gold
Departure	Released: February 29, 1980; Label: Columbia; Formats: LP, cassette, CD	8	48	—	—	—	61	—	—	—	US: 3× Platinum
Escape	Released: July 20, 1981; Label: Columbia; Formats: LP, cassette, CD	1	6	49	—	—	26	—	—	32	US: Diamond (10× Platinum); CAN: 3× Platinum; JPN: Gold
Frontiers	Released: February 1, 1983; Label: Columbia; Formats: LP, cassette, CD	2	10	30	—	12	3	21	—	6	US: 6× Platinum; CAN: Platinum; JPN: Platinum
Raised on Radio	Released: April 21, 1986; Label: Columbia; Formats: LP, cassette, CD	4	39	53	49	—	4	16	26	22	US: 2× Platinum; CAN: Gold; JPN: Gold
Trial by Fire	Released: October 22, 1996; Label: Columbia; Formats: Cassette, CD	3	16	44	89	—	6	24	—	84	US: Platinum; CAN: Gold; JPN: Gold
Arrival	Released: April 3, 2001; Label: Columbia; Formats: cassette, CD, SACD	56	—	75	—	—	19	—	—	193	
Generations	Released: October 4, 2005; Label: Sanctuary; Formats: CD, digital download	170	—	70	—	—	20	39	—	—	
Revelation	Released: June 3, 2008; Label: Nomota; Formats: CD, digital download	5	—	35	51	—	17	28	89	68	US: Platinum
Eclipse	Released: May 24, 2011; Label: Nomota; Formats: CD, vinyl, digital download	13	—	14	44	—	19	24	24	33	
Freedom	Released: July 8, 2022; Label: BMG; Formats: CD, vinyl, digital download	88	—	7	65	—	22	—	2	87	
"—" denotes releases that did not chart or were not released.

=== Soundtrack albums ===
List of soundtracks
Title	Album details
Dream, After Dream	Released: December 10, 1980; Label: Columbia; Formats: LP, cassette, CD

=== Live albums ===
List of albums, with selected chart positions, sales figures and certifications
Title	Album details	Peak chart positions				Certifications
Title	Album details	US	CAN	GER	JPN	Certifications
Captured	Released: January 30, 1981; Label: Columbia; Formats: LP, cassette, CD	9	9	—	75	US: 2× Platinum
Greatest Hits Live	Released: March 24, 1998; Label: Columbia; Formats: LP, cassette, CD	79	—	—	40	US: Platinum
Live in Houston 1981: The Escape Tour	Released: November 2005; Label: Columbia; Formats: CD, DVD/CD	—	—	—	97	
Escape & Frontiers Live in Japan	Released: March 29, 2019; Label: Eagle Rock; Formats: CD, DVD/CD	—	—	36	—	
Live in Concert at Lollapalooza	Released: December 9, 2022; Label: New Frontiers; Formats: CD, DVD/CD	—	—	44	—	
"—" denotes releases that did not chart or were not released.

=== Compilation albums ===
List of albums, with selected chart positions, sales figures and certifications
Title	Album details	Peak chart positions						Certifications
Title	Album details	US	CAN	JPN	NOR	SWE	UK	Certifications
In the Beginning	Released: November 1979; Label: Columbia; Formats: LP, cassette, CD	152	—	—	—	—	—	
Star-Box	Released: August 26, 1988; Label: Columbia; Formats: LP, cassette, CD	—	—	32	—	—	—	
Greatest Hits	Released: November 11, 1988; Label: Columbia; Formats: LP, cassette, CD	10	8	33	30	20	12	US: 18× Platinum; CAN: 8× Platinum; UK: Platinum
The Ballade	Released: 1991; Label: Columbia; Formats: LP, cassette, CD	—	—	—	—	—	—	
Time^{3}	Released: December 1, 1992; Label: Columbia; Formats: CD	90	—	—	—	—	—	US: Gold
The Journey Continues	Released: March 6, 2001; Label: Columbia; Formats: cassette, CD	—	—	48	—	—	—	
The Essential Journey	Released: October 16, 2001; Label: Columbia; Formats: cassette, CD	47	—	—	—	—	—	US: 2× Platinum
Open Arms: Greatest Hits	Released: May 19, 2004; Label: Sony; Format: CD	—	—	44	—	—	—	
Don't Stop Believin': The Best of Journey	Released: October 12, 2009; Label: Sony; Formats: CD	—	—	—	—	—	73	UK: Gold
Greatest Hits 2	Released: November 1, 2011; Label: Sony; Formats: CD	93	—	—	—	—	—	
Greatest Hits I & II	Released: 2011; Label: Sony; Formats: CD	—	—	—	—	—	—	
"—" denotes releases that did not chart or were not released.

== Extended plays ==
List of EPs, with selected chart positions
Title	EP details	Peak chart positions
Title	EP details	JPN
Classics	Released: 1988; Label: Columbia; Formats: LP	—
Red 13	Released: November 26, 2002; Label: Journey; Formats: CD	88
"—" denotes releases that did not chart or were not released.

== Singles ==
List of singles, with selected chart positions and certifications, showing year released and album name
Title	Year	Peak chart positions									Certifications	Album
Title	Year	US CB	US	US Main.	US AC	CAN	JPN	AUS	NZ	UK	Certifications	Album
"To Play Some Music"	1975	—	—	—	—	—	—	—	—	—		Journey
"On a Saturday Night"	1976	—	—	—	—	—	—	—	—	—		Look into the Future
"She Makes Me (Feel Alright)"	1976	—	—	—	—	—	—	—	—	—		Look into the Future
"Spaceman"	1977	—	—	—	—	—	—	—	—	—		Next
"Wheel in the Sky"	1978	52	57	—	—	45	—	—	—	—	US: 2× Platinum	Infinity
"Anytime"	1978	101	83	—	—	—	—	—	—	—		Infinity
"Lights"	1978	67	68	—	—	74	—	—	—	—	US: 2× Platinum	Infinity
"Just the Same Way"	1979	63	58	—	—	80	—	—	—	—		Evolution
"Lovin', Touchin', Squeezin'"	1979	15	16	—	—	12	—	—	37	—	US: 2× Platinum	Evolution
"Too Late"	1979	89	70	—	—	—	—	—	—	—		Evolution
"Any Way You Want It"	1980	21	23	—	—	50	—	—	—	161	UK: Gold; US: 4× Platinum; NZ: Platinum	Departure
"Walks Like a Lady"	1980	41	32	—	—	31	—	—	—	—		Departure
"Good Morning Girl" - "Stay Awhile"	1980	68	55	—	—	—	—	—	—	—		Departure
"The Party's Over (Hopelessly in Love)"	1981	41	34	2	—	33	—	—	—	—		Captured
"Dixie Highway" [airplay]	1981	—	—	30	—	—	—	—	—	—		Captured
"Who's Crying Now"	1981	3	4	4	14	3	4	65	—	46	US: 2× Platinum	Escape
"Don't Stop Believin'"	1981	8	9	8	—	9	—	47	—	62	US: 18× Platinum (digital); AUS: 12× Platinum; NZ: 11× Platinum; UK: 7× Platinum	Escape
"Open Arms"	1982	1	2	35	7	2	—	43	49	169	US: 4× Platinum; CAN: Gold; NZ: Gold	Escape
"Still They Ride"	1982	25	19	47	37	—	—	—	—	—		Escape
"Only Solutions"	1982	—	—	22	—	—	—	—	—	—		Tron
"Stone in Love"	1982	—	—	13	—	—	—	—	—	—	US: Platinum	Escape
"Separate Ways (Worlds Apart)"	1983	9	8	1	—	11	50	93	—	102	US: 4× Platinum; NZ: Gold	Frontiers
"Faithfully"	1983	15	12	—	—	36	—	—	—	—	US: 6× Platinum; NZ: Gold; UK: Silver	Frontiers
"After the Fall"	1983	23	23	30	—	—	—	—	—	—		Frontiers
"Send Her My Love"	1983	31	23	—	27	—	—	—	—	—	US: Gold	Frontiers
"Ask the Lonely"	1983	—	—	3	—	—	—	—	—	—		Two of a Kind
"Only the Young"	1985	18	9	3	—	11	—	—	—	—	US: Gold	Vision Quest
"Be Good to Yourself"	1986	10	9	2	—	43	—	—	—	90		Raised on Radio
"Suzanne"	1986	20	17	11	—	87	—	—	—	—		Raised on Radio
"Girl Can't Help It"	1986	17	17	9	—	60	—	—	—	—	US: Gold	Raised on Radio
"Raised on Radio"	1986	—	—	27	—	—	—	—	—	—		Raised on Radio
"I'll Be Alright Without You"	1986	12	14	26	7	57	—	—	—	—	US: Gold	Raised on Radio
"Why Can't This Night Go on Forever"	1987	68	60	—	24	—	—	—	—	—		Raised on Radio
"When You Love a Woman"	1996	12	12	—	1	3	6	—	—	—	US: Platinum	Trial by Fire
"Message of Love"	1996	—	—	18	—	36	71	—	—	—		Trial by Fire
"Can't Tame the Lion"	1996	—	—	33	—	86	—	—	—	—		Trial by Fire
"If He Should Break Your Heart"	1996	—	—	—	21	13	—	—	—	—		Trial by Fire
"Higher Place"	2001	—	—	—	—	—	—	—	—	—		Arrival
"All the Way"	2001	—	—	—	22	—	—	—	—	—		Arrival
"After All These Years"	2008	—	—	—	9	—	—	—	—	—		Revelation
"Where Did I Lose Your Love"	2008	—	—	—	19	—	—	—	—	—		Revelation
"Anything Is Possible"	2011	—	—	—	21	—	—	—	—	—		Eclipse
"City of Hope"	2011	—	—	—	—	—	—	—	—	—		Eclipse
"Human Feel"	2011	—	—	—	—	—	—	—	—	—		Eclipse
"The Way We Used to Be"	2021	—	—	—	—	—	—	—	—	—		Freedom
"You Got the Best of Me"	2022	—	—	—	—	—	—	—	—	—		Freedom
"Let It Rain"	2022	—	—	—	—	—	—	—	—	—		Freedom
"Don't Give Up on Us"	2022	—	—	—	—	—	—	—	—	—		Freedom
"United We Stand"	2022	—	—	—	—	—	—	—	—	—		Freedom
"—" denotes releases that did not chart or were not released.

=== Billboard and Cash Box year-end performances ===
Year	Song	Year-end position
1981	"Who's Crying Now"	56 / 26
1981	"Don't Stop Believin'"	73 / 58
1982	"Open Arms"	34 / 21
1983	"Separate Ways (Worlds Apart)"	38 / 60
1983	"Faithfully"	81 / —
1997	"When You Love a Woman"	57 / —

== Other certified songs ==
Title	Year	Certifications	Album
"Feeling That Way"	1978	US: Gold	Infinity

== Soundtrack appearances ==
Year	Movie	Title/s	Album
1980	Caddyshack	"Any Way You Want It"	Departure
1981	Heavy Metal	"Open Arms"	Escape
1982	Tron	"Only Solutions", "1990s Theme"	Motion Picture Soundtrack
1983	Two of a Kind	"Ask the Lonely"	Motion Picture Soundtrack
1983	Risky Business	"After the Fall"	Frontiers
1985	Vision Quest	"Only the Young"	Motion Picture Soundtrack
1998	Armageddon: The Album	"Remember Me"	Motion Picture Soundtrack
2003	Charlie's Angels: Full Throttle	"Any Way You Want It"	Departure
2006	Talladega Nights: The Ballad of Ricky Bobby	"Faithfully"	Frontiers
2010	Tron: Legacy	"Separate Ways (Worlds Apart)"	Frontiers
2017	Daddy's Home 2	"Open Arms"	Escape
2022	Stranger Things: Soundtrack from the Netflix Series, Season 4	"Separate Ways (Worlds Apart)" (remix)	Original version from Frontiers

== Videography ==
=== Video albums ===
Year	Title	DVD position	Certification
1984	Frontiers and Beyond		
1986	Raised on Radio		
2001	Journey 2001	15	US: Platinum
2003	Greatest Hits 1978–1997	13	US: 4× Platinum
2005	Live in Houston 1981: The Escape Tour	9	US: Platinum
2009	Live in Manila	1	

=== Music videos ===
Year	Title	From
1978	"Wheel in the Sky"	Infinity
1978	"Feeling That Way"	Infinity
1978	"Lights"	Infinity
1979	"Just the Same Way"	Evolution
1979	"Lovin', Touchin', Squeezin'"	Evolution
1979	"Too Late"	Evolution
1980	"Any Way You Want It"	Departure
1981	"Who's Crying Now"	Escape
1981	"Stone in Love"	Escape
1981	"Don't Stop Believin'" (live)	Escape
1982	"Open Arms"	Escape
1983	"Separate Ways (Worlds Apart)"	Frontiers
1983	"Faithfully"	Frontiers
1983	"Chain Reaction"	Frontiers
1983	"After the Fall"	Frontiers
1983	"Send Her My Love"	Frontiers
1986	"Be Good to Yourself"	Raised On Radio
1986	"Girl Can't Help It"	Raised On Radio
1986	"Raised on Radio"	Raised On Radio
1986	"I'll Be Alright Without You"	Raised On Radio
1987	"Why Can't This Night Go on Forever"	Raised On Radio
1992	"Lights" (live)	Time^{3}
1996	"When You Love a Woman"	Trial By Fire
2001	"Higher Place"	Arrival
2001	"All the Way"	Arrival
2009	"Separate Ways (Worlds Apart)" (live)	Live In Manila
2009	"Don't Stop Believin'" (live)	Live In Manila
2012	"City Of Hope"	Eclipse
2021	"The Way We Used to Be"	Freedom
2022	"You Got The Best Of Me"	Freedom
