= The Essential Journey =

Greatest hits album by Journey
- Released: October 16, 2001
- Recorded: 1977–1996
- Genres: Hard rock, arena rock
- Length: 128:56
- Label: Columbia/Sony

Journey chronology
Arrival (2001)	The Essential Journey (2001)	Red 13 (2002)

Professional ratings
Review scores
Source	Rating
Allmusic	4.5/5 stars

The Essential Journey is a compilation of songs from the rock band Journey. Released on October 16, 2001, it is part of Sony BMG's "Essential" series of compilation albums. The album includes most of Journey's major and minor hits that have charted on Billboard Hot 100. It covers material recorded while Steve Perry was lead singer of the band, from 1978's Infinity to 1996's Trial by Fire, neglecting Journey albums recorded before and after his membership. The first disc is Greatest Hits with some minor changes: tracks are in a slightly different order, "After the Fall" replaces "Be Good to Yourself" (which is on the second disc instead), and "When You Love a Woman" is included (this song was recorded after the release of the original edition of Greatest Hits, but was added to the 2006 CD edition).

The Essential Journey was certified as Platinum in the United States on February 2, 2005, and Double Platinum in the United States on March 3, 2016. It had sold 1,156,000 copies in the US as of August 2013.

== Track listing ==
Disc 1
No.	Title	Writer(s)	Original album	Length
1.	"Only the Young"	Jonathan Cain, Neal Schon, Steve Perry	Vision Quest soundtrack, 1985	4:05
2.	"Don't Stop Believin'"	Cain, N. Schon, S. Perry	Escape, 1981	4:09
3.	"Wheel in the Sky"	Diane Valory, N. Schon, Robert Fleischman	Infinity, 1978	4:13
4.	"Faithfully"	S. Perry, N. Schon, Cain	Frontiers, 1983	4:26
5.	"Any Way You Want It"	N. Schon, S. Perry	Departure, 1980	3:22
6.	"Ask the Lonely"	Cain, S. Perry	Two of a Kind soundtrack, 1983	3:54
7.	"Who's Crying Now"	Cain, S. Perry	Escape	5:01
8.	"Separate Ways (Worlds Apart)"	Cain, S. Perry	Frontiers	5:26
9.	"Lights"	N. Schon, S. Perry	Infinity	3:10
10.	"Lovin', Touchin', Squeezin'"	S. Perry	Evolution, 1979	3:54
11.	"Open Arms"	Cain, S. Perry	Escape	3:19
12.	"Girl Can't Help It"	Cain, N. Schon, S. Perry	Raised on Radio, 1986	3:50
13.	"Send Her My Love"	Cain, S. Perry	Frontiers	3:55
14.	"When You Love a Woman"	Cain, N. Schon, S. Perry	Trial by Fire, 1996	4:08
15.	"I'll Be Alright Without You"	Cain, N. Schon, S. Perry	Raised on Radio	4:34
16.	"After the Fall"	Cain, S. Perry	Frontiers	5:01
Total length:				1:06:27

Disc 2
No.	Title	Writer(s)	Original album	Length
1.	"Chain Reaction"	Cain, N. Schon, S. Perry	Frontiers	4:20
2.	"Message of Love"	Cain, N. Schon, S. Perry, John Bettis	Trial by Fire	5:34
3.	"Somethin' to Hide"	N. Schon, S. Perry	Infinity	3:30
4.	"Line of Fire" (Live)	N. Schon, S. Perry	Captured, 1981; originally from Departure	3:18
5.	"Anytime"	Gregg Rolie, Roger Silver, N. Schon, Fleischman, Ross Valory	Infinity	3:28
6.	"Stone in Love"	Cain, N. Schon, S. Perry	Escape	4:25
7.	"Patiently"	N. Schon, S. Perry	Infinity	3:22
8.	"Good Morning Girl"	N. Schon, S. Perry	Departure	1:44
9.	"The Eyes of a Woman"	Cain, N. Schon, S. Perry	Raised on Radio	4:33
10.	"Be Good to Yourself"	Cain, N. Schon, S. Perry	Raised on Radio	3:52
11.	"Still They Ride"	Cain, N. Schon, S. Perry	Escape	3:49
12.	"Baby I'm a Leavin' You"	Cain, N. Schon, S. Perry	Trial by Fire	2:47
13.	"Mother, Father"	Cain, Matt Schon, N. Schon, S. Perry	Escape	5:28
14.	"Just the Same Way"	Rolie, N. Schon, R. Valory	Evolution	3:18
15.	"Escape"	Cain, N. Schon, S. Perry	Escape	5:17
16.	"The Party's Over (Hopelessly in Love)"	S. Perry	Captured	3:41
Total length:				1:02:23

Disc 3 – Limited Edition 3.0 version only
No.	Title	Writer(s)	Original album	Length
1.	"Don't Stop Believin'" (Live at The Summit, Houston, Texas, 11/6/1981)	Cain, N. Schon, Perry	Live in Houston 1981: The Escape Tour, 2005	4:15
2.	"Stone in Love" (Live at The Summit, Houston, Texas, 11/6/1981)	Cain, N. Schon, Perry	Live in Houston 1981: The Escape Tour	5:14
3.	"When I Think of You"	Cain, Perry	Trial by Fire	4:20
4.	"Suzanne"	Cain, Perry	Raised on Radio	3:38
5.	"Walks Like a Lady"	Perry	Departure	3:16
6.	"Feeling That Way"	Rolie, Perry, Aynsley Dunbar	Infinity	3:28
7.	"Mother, Father" (Live at The Summit, Houston, Texas, 11/6/1981)	Cain, M. Schon, N. Schon, S. Perry	Live in Houston 1981: The Escape Tour	5:21
8.	"I Can See It in Your Eyes"	Cain, N. Schon, S. Perry	Trial by Fire	4:13
Total length:				33:45

== Personnel ==
- Steve Perry – lead vocals
- Neal Schon – electric and acoustic guitars, backing vocals
- Jonathan Cain – keyboard instrument, rhythm guitar, backing vocals
- Ross Valory – bass guitar, backing vocals
- Steve Smith – drums, percussion
- Gregg Rolie – keyboards, backing and co-lead vocals
- Aynsley Dunbar – drums, percussion

== Charts ==
Chart (2001)	Position
United States Billboard 200	47

== Certifications ==
Region	Certification	Certified units/sales
United States (RIAA)	2× Platinum	2,000,000^{‡}
^{‡} Sales+streaming figures based on certification alone.
