= Greatest Hits (Journey album) =

Greatest hits album by Journey
- Released: November 15, 1988
- Recorded: 1977–1996
- Genres: Rock; hard rock; pop rock
- Length: 61:14 (Original); 65:21 (2006 re-release)
- Labels: Columbia; Sony
- Producers: Mike Stone; Kevin Elson; Roy Thomas Baker; Steve Perry; Geoff Workman; Kevin Shirley

Journey chronology
Raised on Radio (1986)	Greatest Hits (1988)	The Ballade (1991)

Professional ratings
Review scores
Source	Rating
AllMusic	4.5/5 stars

Greatest Hits is a compilation album by the American rock band Journey, originally released in 1988 by Columbia Records. It is the band's best-selling career disc, spending 935 weeks on the Billboard 200 albums chart as of November 2026 (more than any other compilation album, except for Bob Marley and the Wailers' Legend, in history). Additionally, the album logged 1,523 weeks on Billboard's Catalog Albums chart prior to the chart's retirement in February 2026.

On January 26, 2024, the Recording Industry Association of America (RIAA) certified Greatest Hits 18× Platinum for sales of 18 million copies in the United States. As of January 2024, it was reported to have been the third-highest certified "greatest hits" package in the United States according to the RIAA, behind similar compilations by only the Eagles and Billy Joel.

Greatest Hits continues to be one of the most popular 'best of' packages, at times selling close to 500,000 copies globally per year. The album has been reissued several times and was digitally remastered for compact disc by Legacy Recordings, issued on August 1, 2006, with "When You Love a Woman" featured as a bonus track. In Japan, the album has been reissued as Open Arms: Greatest Hits with the song "Open Arms" appearing as the first song on the album. A second Journey compilation album, Greatest Hits 2, was released in 2011.

== Track listing ==
Side one
No.	Title	Writer(s)	from the album	Length
1.	"Only the Young"	Steve Perry, Neal Schon, Jonathan Cain	Vision Quest soundtrack (1985)	4:05
2.	"Don't Stop Believin'"	Perry, Schon, Cain	Escape (1981)	4:10
3.	"Wheel in the Sky"	Diane Valory, Schon, Robert Fleischman	Infinity (1978)	4:12
4.	"Faithfully"	Cain	Frontiers (1983)	4:27
5.	"I'll Be Alright Without You"	Perry, Schon, Cain	Raised on Radio (1986)	4:35
6.	"Any Way You Want It"	Perry, Schon	Departure (1980)	3:23
7.	"Ask the Lonely"	Perry, Cain	Two of a Kind soundtrack (1983)	3:54

Side two
No.	Title	Writer(s)	from the album	Length
8.	"Who's Crying Now"	Perry, Cain	Escape	5:02
9.	"Separate Ways (Worlds Apart)"	Perry, Cain	Frontiers	5:26
10.	"Lights"	Perry, Schon	Infinity	3:10
11.	"Lovin', Touchin', Squeezin'"	Perry	Evolution (1979)	3:54
12.	"Open Arms"	Perry, Cain	Escape	3:19
13.	"Girl Can't Help It"	Perry, Cain, Schon	Raised on Radio	3:50
14.	"Send Her My Love"	Perry, Cain	Frontiers	3:55
15.	"Be Good to Yourself"	Perry, Cain, Schon	Raised on Radio	3:51
Total length:				61:14

2006 CD and 2024 remastered edition bonus track
No.	Title	Writer(s)	from the album	Length
16.	"When You Love a Woman"	Perry, Cain, Schon	Trial by Fire (1996)	4:07
Total length:				65:21

2004 CD Open Arms: Greatest Hits – Japanese edition

1. "Open Arms" – 3:19
2. "Only the Young" – 4:05
3. "Don't Stop Believin'" – 4:10
4. "Wheel in the Sky" (album version) – 4:12
5. "Faithfully" – 4:27
6. "I'll Be Alright Without You" (album version) – 4:50
7. "Any Way You Want It" – 3:23
8. "Ask the Lonely" – 3:54
9. "Who's Crying Now" – 5:02
10. "Separate Ways (Worlds Apart)" – 5:26
11. "Lights" – 3:10
12. "Lovin', Touchin', Squeezin'" – 3:54
13. "Girl Can't Help It" – 3:50
14. "Send Her My Love" – 3:55
15. "Be Good to Yourself" – 3:51
16. "When You Love a Woman" – 4:07

Total length: 65:41

== Personnel ==
- Steve Perry – lead vocals
- Neal Schon – guitar, vocals
- Jonathan Cain – keyboards, vocals except on "Wheel in the Sky", "Any Way You Want It", "Lights" and "Lovin', Touchin', Squeezin'"
- Gregg Rolie – keyboards, vocals on "Wheel in the Sky", "Any Way You Want It", "Lights" and "Lovin', Touchin', Squeezin'"
- Ross Valory – bass, vocals except on "I'll Be Alright Without You", "Girl Can't Help It" and "Be Good to Yourself"
- Randy Jackson – bass on "I'll Be Alright Without You", "Girl Can't Help It" and "Be Good to Yourself"
- Steve Smith – drums, vocals except on "Wheel in the Sky", "Lights", "I'll Be Alright Without You", "Girl Can't Help It" and "Be Good to Yourself"
- Aynsley Dunbar – drums on "Wheel in the Sky" and "Lights"
- Larrie Londin – drums on "I'll Be Alright Without You", "Girl Can't Help It" and "Be Good to Yourself"

=== Production personnel ===
- Mike Stone and Kevin Elson – producers on "Only the Young", "Don't Stop Believin'", "Faithfully", "Ask the Lonely", "Who's Crying Now", "Separate Ways", "Open Arms" and "Send Her My Love"
- Roy Thomas Baker – producer on "Wheel in the Sky", "Lights" and "Lovin', Touchin', Squeezin'",
- Steve Perry – producer on "I'll Be Alright Without You", "Girl Can't Help It" and "Be Good to Yourself"
- Geoff Workman and Kevin Elson – producers on "Any Way You Want It"
- Kevin Shirley – producer on "When You Love a Woman"

== Charts ==
=== Weekly charts ===
Weekly chart performance for Greatest Hits
Chart (1988–2020)	Peak position
Canadian Albums (Billboard)	36
Irish Albums (IRMA)	11
Japanese Albums (Oricon)	82
Norwegian Albums (VG-lista)	30
Scottish Albums (Official Charts)	3
Swedish Albums (Sverigetopplistan)	20
UK Albums (Official Charts)	12
US Billboard 200	10
US Top Rock Albums (Billboard)	4

=== Year-end charts ===
Year-end chart performance for Greatest Hits
Chart (1989)	Position
US Billboard 200	39
Chart (2010)	Position
US Billboard 200	106
Chart (2011)	Position
US Billboard 200	102
Chart (2012)	Position
US Billboard 200	117
Chart (2013)	Position
US Billboard 200	145
Chart (2014)	Position
US Billboard 200	103
Chart (2015)	Position
US Billboard 200	78
Chart (2016)	Position
US Billboard 200	88
Chart (2017)	Position
US Billboard 200	92
US Top Rock Albums (Billboard)	11
Chart (2018)	Position
US Billboard 200	90
US Top Rock Albums (Billboard)	8
Chart (2019)	Position
US Billboard 200	70
US Top Rock Albums (Billboard)	11
Chart (2020)	Position
US Billboard 200	71
US Top Rock Albums (Billboard)	6
Chart (2021)	Position
US Billboard 200	66
US Top Rock Albums (Billboard)	6
Chart (2022)	Position
US Billboard 200	93
US Top Rock Albums (Billboard)	11
Chart (2023)	Position
US Billboard 200	87
US Top Rock Albums (Billboard)	11
Chart (2024)	Position
US Billboard 200	99

== Certifications ==
Certifications for Greatest Hits
Region	Certification	Certified units/sales
Canada (Music Canada)	8× Platinum	800,000^{‡}
Ireland (IRMA)	Platinum	15,000^{^}
United Kingdom (BPI)	Platinum	300,000^{‡}
United States (RIAA)	18× Platinum	18,000,000^{‡}
^{^} Shipments figures based on certification alone.^{‡} Sales+streaming figures based on certification alone.

== See also ==
- List of best-selling albums in the United States
