= Time3 =

Time^{3}

Box set by Journey
- Released: December 1, 1992
- Recorded: May 1976 – February 1987
- Genre: Progressive rock; hard rock; rock
- Length: 73:39 (Disc 1); 76:31 (Disc 2); 78:21 (Disc 3)
- Label: Columbia/Sony
- Producer: Roy Halee; Journey; Glen Kolutkin; Roy Thomas Baker; Kevin Elson; Geoff Workman; Mike Stone; Steve Perry

Journey chronology
The Ballade (1991)	Time^{3} (1992)	Trial by Fire (1996)

Professional ratings
Review scores
Source	Rating
Allmusic	4/5 stars

Time^{3} (also known as Time Cubed) is a 1992 three-CD compilation box set by the American rock band Journey. The tracks are arranged chronologically and include both studio and live tracks. A booklet documenting the band's history and song details is included.

With the box set can be heard the progression of the band from the early days with heavy influences from Gregg Rolie (1972-1980), Aynsley Dunbar (1973-1978), and Neal Schon (1972–present), to the changes the band made with the addition of Steve Perry (1978–1997) and Jonathan Cain (1981-present), to the differences of the band after 1983, including Schon's jazz influences and the album Raised on Radio.

The box also features several unreleased Journey songs, alternate versions or even demos such as "Velvet Curtain", the very early (incomplete) version of "Feeling That Way" before Perry rebuilt the whole song structure.

== Track listing ==
Time 1

1. "Of a Lifetime" (Neal Schon, Gregg Rolie, George Tickner)
2. "Kohoutek" (N. Schon, Rolie)
3. "I'm Gonna Leave You" (N. Schon, Rolie, Tickner)
4. "Cookie Duster" (previously unreleased) (Ross Valory)
5. "Nickel and Dime" (N. Schon, Rolie, Tickner, R. Valory)
6. "For You" (previously unreleased, lead vocals by Robert Fleischman) (N. Schon, Rolie, Robert Fleischman)
7. "Velvet Curtain/Feeling That Way" (previously unreleased) (Steve Perry, Rolie, Aynsley Dunbar)
8. "Anytime" (N. Schon, Rolie, Fleischman, R. Valory, Roger Silver)
9. "Patiently" (Perry, N. Schon)
10. "Good Times" (previously unreleased) (Sam Cooke)
11. "Majestic" (Perry, N. Schon)
12. "Too Late" (Perry, N. Schon)
13. "Sweet and Simple" (Perry)
14. "Just the Same Way" (N. Schon, Rolie, R. Valory)
15. "Little Girl" (from the Dream, After Dream soundtrack) (Perry, N. Schon, Rolie)
16. "Any Way You Want It" (Perry, N. Schon)
17. "Someday Soon" (Perry, N. Schon, Rolie)
18. "Good Morning Girl" (Perry, N. Schon)

Time 2

1. "Where Were You" (Perry, N. Schon)
2. "Line of Fire" (Perry, N. Schon)
3. "Homemade Love" (Perry, N. Schon, Steve Smith)
4. "Natural Thing" (B-side of Don't Stop Believin') (Perry, R. Valory)
5. "Lights" (live) (Perry, N. Schon)
6. "Stay Awhile" (live) (Perry, N. Schon)
7. "Walks Like a Lady" (live) (Perry)
8. "Lovin', Touchin', Squeezin'" (live) (Perry)
9. "Dixie Highway" (live) (Perry, N. Schon)
10. "Wheel in the Sky" (live) (N. Schon, Fleishman, Diane Valory)
11. "The Party's Over (Hopelessly in Love)" (Perry)
12. "Don't Stop Believin'" (Perry, N. Schon, Jonathan Cain)
13. "Stone in Love" (Perry, N. Schon, Cain)
14. "Keep on Runnin'" (Perry, N. Schon, Cain)
15. "Who's Crying Now" (Perry, Cain)
16. "Still They Ride" (Perry, N. Schon, Cain)
17. "Open Arms" (Perry, Cain)
18. "Mother, Father" (Perry, N. Schon, Cain, Matthew Schon)

Time 3

1. "La Raza Del Sol" (B-side of "Still They Ride", previously unreleased - alternate version) (Perry, Cain)
2. "Only Solutions" (from the film Tron) (Perry, N. Schon, Cain)
3. "Liberty" (previously unreleased) (Perry, N. Schon, Cain)
4. "Separate Ways (Worlds Apart)" (Perry, Cain)
5. "Send Her My Love" (Perry, Cain)
6. "Faithfully" (Cain)
7. "After the Fall" (Perry, Cain)
8. "All That Really Matters" (previously unreleased, lead vocals by Jonathan Cain) (N. Schon, Cain)
9. "The Eyes of a Woman" (Perry, N. Schon, Cain)
10. "Why Can't This Night Go on Forever" (Perry, Cain)
11. "Once You Love Somebody" (Perry, N. Schon, Cain)
12. "Happy to Give" (Perry, Cain)
13. "Be Good to Yourself" (Perry, N. Schon, Cain)
14. "Only the Young" (from the film Vision Quest) (Perry, N. Schon, Cain)
15. "Ask the Lonely" (from the film Two of a Kind) (Perry, Cain)
16. "With a Tear" (instrumental; previously unreleased) (Perry, N. Schon, Cain)
17. "Into Your Arms" (instrumental; previously unreleased) (Perry, N. Schon, Cain)
18. "Girl Can't Help It" (previously unreleased - live video mix) (Perry, N. Schon, Cain)
19. "I'll Be Alright Without You" (previously unreleased - live video mix) (Perry, N. Schon, Cain)
