= Live in Concert at Lollapalooza =

Live album by Journey
- Released: December 9, 2022
- Recorded: July 31, 2021
- Venues: Grant Park, Chicago, Illinois
- Genre: Rock
- Language: English
- Label: New Frontiers

Journey chronology
| Freedom (2022) | Live in Concert at Lollapalooza (2022) |

Live In Concert At Lollapalooza is a live album by the American rock band Journey, recorded in 2021 and released in 2022.

== Track listing ==
| No. | Title | Writer(s) | Length |
|---|---|---|---|
| 1. | "Separate Ways (Worlds Apart)" | Steve Perry, Jonathan Cain | 5:42 |
| 2. | "Only the Young" | Perry, Neal Schon, Cain | 4:21 |
| 3. | "Guitar Interlude" | | 1:11 |
| 4. | "Stone in Love" | Perry, Schon, Cain | 5:19 |
| 5. | "Be Good to Yourself" | Perry, Schon, Cain | 4:42 |
| 6. | "Just the Same Way" | Schon, Gregg Rolie, Ross Valory | 4:35 |
| 7. | "Lights" | Perry, Schon | 3:38 |
| 8. | "Still They Ride" | Perry, Schon, Cain | 4:14 |
| 9. | "Escape" | Perry, Schon, Cain | 5:22 |
| 10. | "La Do Da" | Perry, Schon | 10:25 |
| 11. | "Piano Interlude" | | 3:01 |
| 12. | "Who's Crying Now" | Perry, Cain | 7:04 |
| 13. | "Guitar Interlude 2" | | 0:44 |
| 14. | "Wheel in the Sky" | Schon, Robert Fleischman, Diane Valory | 7:52 |
| 15. | "Ask the Lonely" | Perry, Cain | 4:31 |
| 16. | "Open Arms" | Perry, Cain | 4:46 |
| 17. | "Lovin', Touchin', Squeezin'" | Perry | 5:29 |
| 18. | "Faithfully" | Cain | 5:57 |
| 19. | "Any Way You Want It" | Perry, Schon | 3:36 |
| 20. | "Don't Stop Believin'" | Perry, Schon, Cain | 6:36 |

== Personnel ==
Credits adapted from Sonic Perspectives.

Journey

- Neal Schon – lead guitar, backing vocals
- Jonathan Cain – keyboards, rhythm guitar, backing vocals, co-lead vocals on "Just the Same Way"
- Arnel Pineda – lead vocals
- Narada Michael Walden – drums
- Jason Derlatka – keyboards, backing vocals
- Deen Castronovo – drums, backing vocals
- Marco Mendoza – bass, backing vocals

== Charts ==
Chart performance for Live in Concert at Lollapalooza
| Chart (2022) | Peak position |
|---|---|
| German Albums (Offizielle Top 100) | 44 |
| Swiss Albums (Schweizer Hitparade) | 40 |
