= The Ballade =

Greatest hits album by Journey
- Released: December 12, 1991
- Recorded: 1977–1986
- Genre: Rock
- Length: 57:05
- Label: Sony Music Distribution

Journey chronology
Greatest Hits (1988)	The Ballade (1991)	Time3 (1992)

Professional ratings
Review scores
Source	Rating
Allmusic	4/5 stars

The Ballade is a Japanese-only compilation album by the American rock band Journey. Released in 1991, it comprises fifteen of their most popular love songs, including the hits "Open Arms", "Faithfully", "I'll Be Alright Without You", "Who's Crying Now", and "Still They Ride". The songs featured on this compilation are from the U.S. releases Infinity, Evolution, Departure, Escape, Frontiers and Raised on Radio.

The album has been reissued throughout the years, however never in the United States.

== Track listing ==
1. "Open Arms" - 3:20 (from the 1981 album Escape)
2. "Lights" - 3:11 (from the 1978 album Infinity)
3. "Too Late" - 2:59 (from the 1979 album Evolution)
4. "Faithfully" - 4:27 (from the 1983 album Frontiers)
5. "I'll Be Alright Without You" - 4:50 (from the 1986 album Raised on Radio)
6. "Patiently" - 3:23 (from Infinity)
7. "Who's Crying Now" - 5:02 (from Escape)
8. "After the Fall" - 5:01 (from Frontiers)
9. "The Eyes of a Woman" - 4:35 (from Raised on Radio)
10. "Opened the Door" - 4:33 (from Infinity)
11. "Good Morning Girl" - 1:44 (from the 1980 album Departure)
12. "Stay Awhile" - 2:50 (from Departure)
13. "Still They Ride" - 3:48 (from Escape)
14. "Send Her My Love" - 3:56 (from Frontiers)
15. "Why Can't This Night Go on Forever" - 3:43 (from Raised on Radio)

All of the songs are full album versions.
