= Ask the Lonely =

Ask the Lonely may refer to:

- Ask the Lonely (Four Tops song), 1965
- Ask the Lonely (Journey song), 1983
