= For a Lifetime =

Studio album by Jonathan Cain
- Released: February 24, 1998
- Recorded: 1997
- Genre: Pop Instrumental
- Length: 48:33
- Label: Higher Octave Records
- Producer: Jonathan Cain

Jonathan Cain chronology
| Body Language (1997) | For a Lifetime (1998) | Namaste (2001) |

Professional ratings
Review scores
| Source | Rating |
|---|---|
| Allmusic | 4/5 stars |

For a Lifetime is a piano-based instrumental album by Jonathan Cain released in 1998. As explained in the liner notes, Cain's composition was inspired by the weddings of eight couples including the song "A Day to Remember" which is dedicated to his fellow Journey bandmate Neal Schon. The album includes Cain's instrumental version of "Open Arms", the famous Journey song he co-wrote with Steve Perry. The CD is recorded with HDCD encoding.

== Track listing ==
All songs written by Jonathan Cain, except as noted.

1. "For a Lifetime" - 4:00
2. "Open Arms" (Cain, Perry) - 3:41
3. "A Day to Remember" - 3:58
4. "Song of Calabria" - 3:50
5. "Just to Love You" - 3:38 (3.45 on later albums)
6. "One Look" - 3:36
7. "Blue Nocturne" - 3:29
8. "China Moon" - 3:46
9. "Precious Moments" - 2:51
10. "Olema Waltz" - 3:30
11. "A Wish for Christmas" - 3:08
12. "Waves and Dreams" - 4:12
13. "Bridal March" - 1:47

== Album credits ==
=== Personnel ===
- Jonathan Cain - all instruments, production, engineering
- Ken Lee - mastering
