= Girl Can't Help It =

Girl Can't Help It may refer to:

- The Girl Can't Help It, a 1956 film
  - "The Girl Can't Help It" (song)
- "Girl Can't Help It" (song), a 1986 song by Journey
- Girls Can't Help It, an early 1980s all-girl British pop trio, put together by Colin Campsie and George McFarlane of the Quick
