= Raised on Radio Tour =

1986–87 concert tour by Journey

- Tour by Journey
- Poster to a concert in Philadelphia
- Location: United States
- Associated album: Raised on Radio
- Start date: August 23, 1986
- End date: February 1, 1987
- No. of shows: 75

Journey concert chronology
- Frontiers Tour (1983); Raised on Radio Tour (1986–1987); Vacation's Over Tour (1998–1999)

The Raised on Radio Tour was a concert tour by the American rock band Journey. The tour was the last with lead singer Steve Perry. It was the only tour with Randy Jackson on bass, while Mike Baird played drums. The band's previous rhythm section, Ross Valory and Steve Smith, were fired during recording sessions for the preceding Raised on Radio album. Valory and Smith, however, received their percentage of the profits from the tour.

== Background ==
The tour started on August 23, 1986, at the Mountain Aire Festival in Angels Camp, California and ended February 1, 1987 in Anchorage, Alaska. Opening acts for the tour included Honeymoon Suite, The Outfield, Glass Tiger and Andy Taylor from Duran Duran. The tour was videotaped by MTV and made into a documentary, which includes interviews and concert footage of the band at the height of their career. State of the art computerized lighting and large movable video screens that resembled pool table holders were used as part of the elaborate stage design.

Perry left the band at the conclusion of the last concert, citing that he was tired of touring, which in turn was affecting his health and voice, and did not like the band's music being used in commercials or other endeavors:

I called Jon and Neal together. We met in San Rafael, we sat on the edge of the marina, and I just told them, 'I can't do this anymore. I've got to get out for a while.' And they said: 'Well, what do you mean?' And I said: 'That's exactly what I mean, is what I'm saying. I just don't want to be in the band any more. I want to get out, I want to stop.' And I think Jon said: 'Well, just take some time off, and we'll think,' and I said: 'OK, fine.' And I just sort of fell back into my life. I looked around and realized that my whole life had become everything I'd worked so hard to be, and when I came back to have a regular life, I had to go find one.
— Steve Perry

== Tour dates ==
| Date | City | Country | Venue | Attendance | Gross |
|---|---|---|---|---|---|
| August 23, 1986 | Angels Camp | United States | Mountain Aire Festival | 18,216 / 18,216 | $455,928 |
| September 10, 1986 | Portland | United States | Portland Memorial Coliseum | | |
| September 11, 1986 | Portland | United States | Portland Memorial Coliseum | | |
| September 13, 1986 | Seattle | United States | Seattle Center Coliseum | | |
| September 14, 1986 | Seattle | United States | Seattle Center Coliseum | | |
| September 16, 1986 | Boise | United States | BSU Pavilion | 8,688 / 8,688 | $130,099 |
| September 17, 1986 | Salt Lake City | United States | Salt Palace | | |
| September 19, 1986 | Denver | United States | McNichols Sports Arena | 16,286 / 18,235 | $267,159 |
| September 20, 1986 | Lincoln | United States | Bob Devaney Sports Center | | |
| September 21, 1986 | Kansas City | United States | Kemper Arena | 13,684 / 13,684 | $213,584 |
| September 25, 1986 | Bloomington | United States | Met Center | 14,022 / 17,700 | $222,173 |
| September 26, 1986 | Milwaukee | United States | MECCA Arena | 8,259 / 8,259 | $136,274 |
| September 28, 1986 | Indianapolis | United States | Market Square Arena | 11,544 / 11,544 | $178,782 |
| September 30, 1986 | St. Louis | United States | St. Louis Arena | 15,614 / 15,614 | $210,880 |
| October 1, 1986 | Louisville | United States | Freedom Hall | 11,394 / 11,394 | $182,304 |
| October 2, 1986 | Cincinnati | United States | Riverfront Coliseum | 14,192 / 14,192 | $228,966 |
| October 4, 1986 | Rosemont | United States | Rosemont Horizon | 15,543 / 15,543 | $270,221 |
| October 5, 1986 | Champaign | United States | Assembly Hall | | |
| October 8, 1986 | Detroit | United States | Joe Louis Arena | 35,007 / 35,007 | $577,616 |
| October 9, 1986 | Detroit | United States | Joe Louis Arena | 35,007 / 35,007 | $577,616 |
| October 11, 1986 | Richfield | United States | Richfield Coliseum | 31,602 / 35,000 | $505,632 |
| October 12, 1986 | Richfield | United States | Richfield Coliseum | 31,602 / 35,000 | $505,632 |
| October 14, 1986 | Philadelphia | United States | The Spectrum | 32,350 / 32,350 | $533,775 |
| October 15, 1986 | Philadelphia | United States | The Spectrum | 32,350 / 32,350 | $533,775 |
| October 18, 1986 | Buffalo | United States | Buffalo Memorial Auditorium | 13,254 / 13,254 | $218,695 |
| October 19, 1986 | Pittsburgh | United States | Civic Arena | 31,773 / 31,773 | $508,724 |
| October 20, 1986 | Pittsburgh | United States | Civic Arena | 31,773 / 31,773 | $508,724 |
| October 22, 1986 | Landover | United States | Capital Centre | 29,806 / 29,806 | $491,779 |
| October 23, 1986 | Landover | United States | Capital Centre | 29,806 / 29,806 | $491,779 |
| October 25, 1986 | East Rutherford | United States | Brendan Byrne Arena | 57,483 / 61,398 | $946,113 |
| October 26, 1986 | East Rutherford | United States | Brendan Byrne Arena | 57,483 / 61,398 | $946,113 |
| October 28, 1986 | East Rutherford | United States | Brendan Byrne Arena | 57,483 / 61,398 | $946,113 |
| October 30, 1986 | Worcester | United States | Worcester Centrum | 24,910 / 24,910 | $411,903 |
| October 31, 1986 | Worcester | United States | Worcester Centrum | 24,910 / 24,910 | $411,903 |
| November 2, 1986 | Providence | United States | Providence Civic Center | 12,868 / 12,868 | $215,693 |
| November 3, 1986 | Hartford | United States | Hartford Civic Center | | |
| November 4, 1986 | Hartford | United States | Hartford Civic Center | | |
| November 6, 1986 | Hampton | United States | Hampton Coliseum | 13,487 / 13,487 | $215,792 |
| November 8, 1986 | Charleston | United States | Charleston Civic Center | 12,508 / 12,508 | $200,128 |
| November 13, 1986 | Greensboro | United States | Greensboro Coliseum | 15,148 / 15,148 | $242,363 |
| November 14, 1986 | Charlotte | United States | Charlotte Coliseum | 12,485 / 12,485 | $199,760 |
| November 15, 1986 | Columbia | United States | Carolina Coliseum | 11,684 / 11,684 | $186,944 |
| November 18, 1986 | Atlanta | United States | Omni Coliseum | | |
| November 21, 1986 | Jacksonville | United States | Jacksonville Coliseum | 11,277 / 11,277 | $180,432 |
| November 22, 1986 | Lakeland | United States | Jenkins Arena | 9,878 / 9,878 | $162,987 |
| November 23, 1986 | Pembroke Pines | United States | Hollywood Sportatorium | 13,496 / 13,496 | $215,936 |
| November 26, 1986 | Birmingham | United States | BJCC Coliseum | 13,519 / 13,519 | $216,304 |
| November 28, 1986 | Chattanooga | United States | UTC Arena | | |
| November 29, 1986 | Memphis | United States | Mid-South Coliseum | 11,122 / 11,122 | $177,952 |
| November 30, 1986 | Biloxi | United States | Mississippi Coast Coliseum | | |
| December 2, 1986 | Dallas | United States | Reunion Arena | 30,166 / 30,166 | $527,905 |
| December 3, 1986 | Dallas | United States | Reunion Arena | 30,166 / 30,166 | $527,905 |
| December 4, 1986 | Oklahoma City | United States | Myriad Convention Center | 14,286 / 14,286 | $250,005 |
| December 6, 1986 | Shreveport | United States | Hirsch Memorial Coliseum | 10,000 / 10,000 | $165,000 |
| December 7, 1986 | Biloxi | United States | Mississippi Coast Coliseum | 15,073 / 15,073 | $248,705 |
| December 9, 1986 | New Orleans | United States | Lakefront Arena | 9,091 / 9,091 | $154,547 |
| December 10, 1986 | Houston | United States | The Summit | 15,884 / 15,884 | $262,086 |
| December 12, 1986 | Austin | United States | Frank Erwin Center | 15,924 / 15,924 | $258,627 |
| December 14, 1986 | Phoenix | United States | Veterans Memorial Coliseum | 24,979 / 24,979 | $412,754 |
| December 15, 1986 | Phoenix | United States | Veterans Memorial Coliseum | 24,979 / 24,979 | $412,754 |
| December 17, 1986 | Tucson | United States | Tucson Convention Center | 8,471 / 8,471 | $139,772 |
| December 20, 1986 | Daly City | United States | Cow Palace | 23,380 / 23,380 | $409,150 |
| December 21, 1986 | Daly City | United States | Cow Palace | 23,380 / 23,380 | $409,150 |
| December 26, 1986 | Long Beach | United States | Long Beach Arena | 25,276 / 25,276 | $514,416 |
| December 27, 1986 | Long Beach | United States | Long Beach Arena | 25,276 / 25,276 | $514,416 |
| December 29, 1986 | Fresno | United States | Selland Arena | 9,771 / 9,771 | $155,224 |
| December 30, 1986 | San Diego | United States | San Diego Sports Arena | 11,016 / 11,016 | $182,638 |
| December 31, 1986 | Long Beach | United States | Long Beach Arena | 12,638 / 12,638 | $257,208 |
| January 2, 1987 | Fresno | United States | Selland Arena | 9,771 / 9,771 | $155,224 |
| January 4, 1987 | San Diego | United States | San Diego Sports Arena | 11,016 / 11,016 | $182,638 |
| January 15, 1987 | Honolulu | United States | Blaisdell Arena | 22,550 / 22,550 | $394,625 |
| January 17, 1987 | Honolulu | United States | Blaisdell Arena | 22,550 / 22,550 | $394,625 |
| January 18, 1987 | Honolulu | United States | Blaisdell Arena | 22,550 / 22,550 | $394,625 |
| January 21, 1987 | Anchorage | United States | Sullivan Arena | | |
| January 22, 1987 | Anchorage | Sullivan Arena | | | |
| January 23, 1987 | Anchorage | Sullivan Arena | | | |

=== Cancelled shows ===
| Date | City | Country | Venue | Reason |
|---|---|---|---|---|
| November 9, 1986 | Richmond | United States | Richmond Coliseum | |
| November 11, 1986 | Roanoke | United States | Roanoke Civic Center | |
| —N/a | Tokyo | Japan | —N/a | |

== Personnel ==
- Steve Perry – lead vocals, keyboards
- Neal Schon – lead guitar, backing vocals
- Jonathan Cain – keyboards, rhythm guitar, backing vocals
- Randy Jackson – bass, backing vocals
- Mike Baird – drums
