= After the Fall (song) =

Single by Journey

from the album Frontiers
- B-side: "Only Solutions"
- Released: July 1, 1983 (US)
- Recorded: 1982
- Genre: Rock
- Length: 5:00 (Album version); 4:25 (Single version)
- Label: Columbia
- Songwriters: Jonathan Cain, Steve Perry

Journey singles chronology
"Faithfully" (1983)	"After the Fall" (1983)	"Send Her My Love" (1983)

Music video
- "After the Fall" on YouTube

"After the Fall" is a song by the American rock band Journey. Written by Jonathan Cain and Steve Perry, it was the third single released from their 1983 album Frontiers.

Peaking at #23 on the Billboard Hot 100 chart, it was the band's 11th top 40 and their ninth top 25 single. It spent 12 weeks on the chart overall. It also reached #30 on the Mainstream Rock chart.

Cash Box said the song "manages to walk the tightrope between AOR and pop" and praised the guitar solo and the "near-perfect fade-out."

The song appeared in the 1983 film Risky Business, starring Tom Cruise and Rebecca De Mornay.

It was the first Journey track to feature bass guitarist Randy Jackson, who would join the band for their following album Raised on Radio and its tour and would rejoin the group in 2020.

== Personnel ==
- Steve Perry–lead vocals
- Neal Schon–guitar, backing vocals
- Jonathan Cain–keyboards, backing vocals
- Steve Smith–drums, percussion
- Ross Valory–backing vocals
- Randy Jackson–bass
