= Be Good to Yourself =

Single by Journey

from the album Raised on Radio
- B-side: "Only the Young"
- Released: April 1986 (US)
- Recorded: 1985
- Genre: •Arena rock •Synth-Rock
- Length: 3:51
- Label: Columbia
- Songwriters: Steve Perry, Jonathan Cain, Neal Schon
- Producer: Steve Perry

Journey singles chronology
| "Only the Young" (1985) | "Be Good to Yourself" (1986) | "Suzanne" (1986) |

"Be Good to Yourself" is a song by Journey from their ninth studio album, Raised on Radio. Released in 1986 as the first single from the album, the song reached number 9 on the U.S. Billboard Hot 100.

== Background ==
The single heralded the band's first new album in three years, as singer Steve Perry had taken time off for a hit solo album and had appeared on 1985's "We Are the World", while guitarist Neal Schon had recorded a one-off album as part of Hagar Schon Aaronson Shrieve.

The title owes itself to a sort of mantra of Perry's at the time, which keyboardist Jonathan Cain jotted down in his notes during writing sessions for the album. Calling it a "Perry-ism" in the liner notes to 1992's box set Time^{3}, Cain explains, "With his own domestic situation in disarray and his mother slowly dying, Perry needed life affirming messages." Still, a complete song eluded the band for five months before coming together in a sudden moment of inspiration in the shower for Cain on the very day they were booked to finish the record; Perry was equally inspired, working out his entire finished vocals in under an hour. "Be Good to Yourself" has words by Steve Perry and Jonathan Cain and music by Perry, Cain and Neal Schon, who are the only members of Journey to appear on the single. The 1980s saw advanced new technological approaches to writing and recording music, which resulted in the departure of founding member Ross Valory, the band's bassist, and drummer Steve Smith, replaced with studio musicians for the album and tour including drummer Larrie Londin and bassist Randy Jackson. "Be Good to Yourself" was the first release following this development, and was produced by Perry and mixed by Bob Clearmountain.

== Music video ==
Journey made front-page news in Billboard magazine for the superstar rock act's decision at the height of MTV's influence and popularity to release no music video in support of their new album's lead single. "We're not trying to say, 'To hell with you MTV,'" the band's manager, Herbie Herbert, was quoted as saying, going on to explain that while the band appreciated the heavy rotation the video music channel had given to previous clips, they actually feared overexposure and having the song and the band too closely linked with a particular director's vision rather than the music speaking for itself. The band also eschewed corporate sponsorship for a tour that year. Two of four subsequent singles from the album, "Girl Can't Help It" and "I'll Be Alright Without You", were supported by live concert clips that received strong rotation at MTV. In light of the airplay that these performance clips achieved, a live music video for "Be Good to Yourself" was later released.

== Reception ==
Billboard wrote upon the single's release—when it became the second-most added song at radio after Madonna's "Live to Tell"—"Power pop kingpins return with a bang, reelin' and a-rockin' and defying expectations of a ballad". The song peaked at #9 on the Billboard Hot 100 the week of May 31, 1986, tying with "Don't Stop Believin'" and "Only the Young" for their fourth-highest peak on that chart. It fared even better on the Hot Mainstream Rock Tracks chart, where it peaked at #2, tying "The Party's Over (Hopelessly in Love)" as their second-most successful single on that chart, after "Separate Ways (Worlds Apart)". Raised on Radio became their fourth consecutive Top 10 album, reaching its peak of #4 the same week "Be Good to Yourself" topped out on the Hot 100; it was their seventh consecutive multi-platinum album in the U.S. The song also charted in Canada and the UK.

"Be Good to Yourself" appears on several of the band's hits compilations and has been a staple of most of the various formations of the band's tours since its release. "Be Good to Yourself" is played in 1987's White Water Summer starring Kevin Bacon and Sean Astin.

== Song structure ==
The uptempo song starts off with a keyboard driven riff by Cain. Perry soars swiftly through an inspirational pair of verses and choruses over a driving beat and surging guitars punctuated by punchy keyboards. The intro keyboard riff returns briefly before the final third of the song devotes itself to an extended guitar solo by Schon over a G major, D minor, F major, C major chord progression.

== Personnel ==
Credits for Raised on Radio adapted from liner notes.

Journey

- Steve Perry – lead and backing vocals
- Neal Schon – guitar, backing vocals
- Jonathan Cain – keyboards, backing vocals

Additional musicians

- Randy Jackson – bass
- Larrie Londin – drums
