= Only the Young (Journey song) =

1985 single by Journey

Single by Journey

from the album Vision Quest Soundtrack
- B-side: "I'll Fall in Love Again" by Sammy Hagar
- Released: January 7, 1985
- Genre: Rock
- Length: 4:17 (Album version); 4:06 (Single version)
- Label: Geffen Records
- Songwriters: Jonathan Cain, Steve Perry, Neal Schon
- Producer: Bruce Broughton

Journey singles chronology
"Ask the Lonely" (1983)	"Only the Young" (1985)	"Be Good to Yourself" (1986)

"Only the Young" is a song written by Jonathan Cain, Steve Perry and Neal Schon of the band Journey. Previously intended for Journey's 1983 album Frontiers, it was pulled from the album within days of recording in favor of songs "Back Talk" and "Troubled Child". It was then sold to the band Scandal, who released it in 1984 on their album Warrior, as the first commercially released version of the song. Journey's version was included on the soundtrack to the 1985 film Vision Quest, and was released as a single which reached the top 10 of the U.S. Billboard Hot 100.

== Background ==
The first individual outside the band to hear the song was sixteen-year-old Kenny Sykaluk of Rocky River, Ohio, who was diagnosed with cystic fibrosis. His mother wrote a letter to the band telling them about her son's terminal condition, and how big a fan he was of Journey. The band flew to his hospital bedside in Cleveland, Ohio at the request of the Make-A-Wish Foundation. Along with a Walkman containing the new track, the band also brought Kenny a football helmet signed by the San Francisco 49ers and an autographed Journey platinum record award. The experience of playing the song for Kenny left Steve Perry and Jonathan Cain deeply affected. Perry said, "As soon as I walked out of the hospital room, I lost it. Nurses had to take me to a room by myself." On the band's episode of VH1's Behind the Music, Cain broke down in tears recalling the event. Kenny died the next day, with the Walkman still in his hand. The song brought life into perspective for the band and left them humbled. Neal Schon said that Kenny's death affected Journey by making them re-evaluate the issues that were causing friction inside the band itself. In honor of Kenny Sykaluk, the band used the song as their opener for the Raised on Radio Tour.

== Reception ==
Cash Box said that the single is "Journey at its very best."

== Chart performance ==
"Only the Young" by Journey was eventually released as a single (which reached No. 9 on the Billboard Hot 100 chart in March 1985) and appeared on the soundtrack to the 1985 film Vision Quest. It also reached No. 3 on the Mainstream Rock chart. The song's lyrical theme focuses on young people and the hope and future they all have in front of them. The song was featured later as a bonus track on the 2006 CD reissue of Frontiers.

== Certifications ==
Region	Certification	Certified units/sales
United States (RIAA)	Gold	500,000^{‡}
^{‡} Sales+streaming figures based on certification alone.
