= Ask the Lonely (Journey song) =

1983 single by Journey

Single by Journey

from the album Two of a Kind
- B-side: "Troubled Child"
- Released: 1983
- Genre: Arena rock
- Length: 3:56
- Label: MCA; CBS/Sony
- Songwriters: Steve Perry; Jonathan Cain
- Producers: Kevin Elson; Mike Stone

Journey singles chronology
"Send Her My Love" (1983)	"Ask the Lonely" (1983)	"Only the Young" (1985)

"Ask the Lonely" is a song by American rock band Journey. It was featured in the 1983 film Two of a Kind and its respective soundtrack. The song was a radio rock hit in the U.S. (despite only receiving a single release in Japan) and appears on their 1988 Greatest Hits album. The single was backed with "Troubled Child", a track from their 1983 album Frontiers. CD reissues of that album feature "Ask the Lonely" as a bonus track.

The track reached number 3 on the Billboard Top Rock Tracks chart in January 1984.

== Track listing ==
1. "Ask the Lonely" (Perry, Cain) – 3:56
2. "Troubled Child" (Cain, Schon, Perry) – 4:29

== Personnel ==
- Steve Perry - vocals
- Neal Schon - guitar, vocals
- Jonathan Cain - keyboards, vocals
- Ross Valory - bass, vocals
- Steve Smith - drums

== Charts ==
Chart (1983–1984)	Peak position
US Mainstream Rock (Billboard)	3
