= Girl Can't Help It (song) =

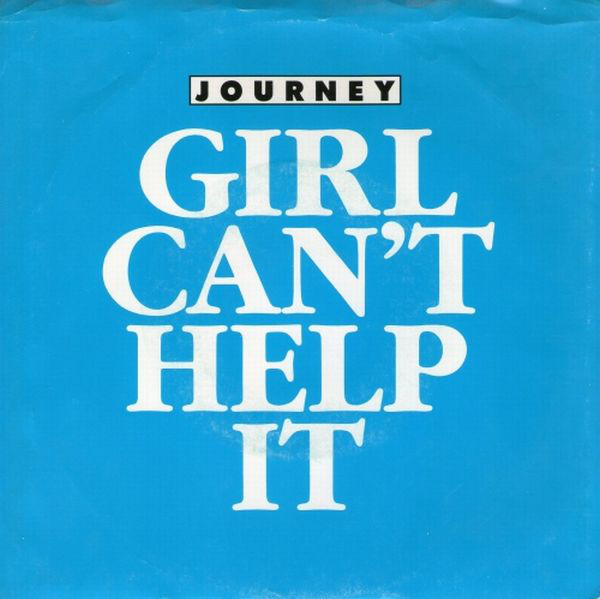

Single by Journey

from the album Raised on Radio
- B-side: "It Could Have Been You"
- Released: August 1986 (US): November 1986 (UK)
- Recorded: late 1985
- Genre: Pop rock, blue-eyed soul
- Length: 3:53
- Label: Columbia - 06302
- Songwriters: Jonathan Cain, Steve Perry, Neal Schon
- Producer: Steve Perry

Journey singles chronology
"Suzanne" (1986)	"Girl Can't Help It" (1986)	"I'll Be Alright Without You" (1986)

"Girl Can't Help It" is a song by the American rock band Journey, from their 1986 album Raised on Radio. The song was released as the third single from that album, following "Be Good to Yourself" and "Suzanne". Like the previous two singles, "Girl Can't Help It" was a Billboard top 40 hit, entering the chart on September 20, 1986 and peaking at number 17. It also became a top 10 rock hit, peaking at number 9 on the Billboard Mainstream Rock chart.

"Girl Can't Help It" was written by Journey keyboardist Jonathan Cain, vocalist Steve Perry, and guitarist Neal Schon, at the time of the song's release the only three members remaining in the band.

== Personnel ==
Credits for Raised on Radio adapted from liner notes.

Journey

- Steve Perry – lead and backing vocals
- Neal Schon – guitar, backing vocals
- Jonathan Cain – keyboards, backing vocals

Additional musicians

- Randy Jackson – bass
- Larrie Londin – drums

== Certifications ==
Region	Certification	Certified units/sales
United States (RIAA)	Gold	500,000^{‡}
^{‡} Sales+streaming figures based on certification alone.
