= Separate Ways (Worlds Apart) =

1983 single by Journey

Single by Journey

from the album Frontiers
- B-side: "Frontiers"
- Released: January 4, 1983
- Genre: Hard rock
- Length: 5:24 (album version); 4:21 (single version)
- Label: Columbia
- Songwriters: Jonathan Cain; Steve Perry
- Producers: Kevin Elson; Mike Stone

Journey singles chronology
"Only Solutions" (1982)	"Separate Ways (Worlds Apart)" (1983)	"Faithfully" (1983)

Music video
- "Separate Ways (Worlds Apart)" on YouTube

"Separate Ways (Worlds Apart)" is a song performed by the American rock band Journey, recorded for their album Frontiers and released as a single in January 1983. It peaked at number 8 for six consecutive weeks on the Billboard Hot 100 chart, and spent four weeks at number 1 on the Top Tracks chart. The song is also well known for its use in the films Yes Man, Tron: Legacy, and in season four of Stranger Things.

To accompany the song on MTV, the band shot its first concept video in New Orleans, Louisiana.

== Background and writing ==
The song was written and composed in 1982 during the Escape tour. It is not certain exactly when it was first performed live. Some sources claim that the first live performance of the song was in 1982 at the Day on the Green concert, where singer Steve Perry told the crowd, "We just wrote this song about two weeks ago." However, bootleg recordings exist of performances at least a month earlier at Chicago's Rosemont Horizon, where Perry also says the song was two weeks old.

There were some minor differences in the lyrics on this live debut compared to the final version found on Frontiers. In a 2008 interview, guitarist Neal Schon recalled the first time it was played live:

It doesn't matter where we put this song because it has always had a strong effect on the audience, all the way back to the first time we played it—before it was even recorded. It was written on tour and we threw it in the set to see how it would go down. The audience had an amazing reaction to it without even knowing what it was.

"Usually we don't write songs that far in advance of an album," observed Jonathan Cain, the band's keyboardist, as Andy Secher, in his article "Adventures in Frontierland," published in the June 1983 issue of Hit Parader Magazine, quoted him. "But on that occasion, Steve [Perry] and I were just working an idea backstage and it all came together. He was working on a bass and I had a guitar, and we just worked out the melody that night and the lyrics the next afternoon. Sometimes you can get lucky and have a song fall together like that."

Schon said that the song was, like many other songs by the band, "Motown mixed with R&B and blues ... that's pretty much where 'Separate Ways' is coming from. It's got a heavier guitar than an R&B song, but I think that's what makes it sound like Journey."

Cain said the same thing in 1983:

We wanted to write something rhythmic and still have a strong and haunting melody. We needed a main rhythm to run through the synthesizer and Steve Smith designed that kind of drum beat to let everything breathe. It's really a throwback to all of our roots and the Motown sound. Steve [Perry] has always listened to a lot of Motown records, songs with a strong chorus approach. Songs that were real urgent sounding, but still had rhythm and melody."

== Music video ==
The music video for "Separate Ways" was the first single for which the band shot a choreographed video: previous videos were performances that were taped and edited, expanded with "Faithfully" to include a montage of the band on tour shot by a crew from NFL Films. Steve Perry had been very opposed to making a choreographed video. "He'd always say, 'We're performers, we're entertainers, but we're not actors,'" recalled Cain. "And we were not a very photogenic band."

In the video, which used the shorter single version, the band performs the song while a young woman in a white jacket and black leather skirt walks along the wharf. At some points, Perry and the other members of the band perform right next to her, and seem to be singing to her, but she remains oblivious. In the ending, she is seen in a bed, wearing headphones. John Diaz, the producer, explains that the idea was that she had dreamed the video after falling asleep while listening to the song. "Our concepts were so inane."

The video was directed by Tom Buckholtz and featured the band playing at the Louisa Street Wharf in New Orleans.

The video is now infamous for the scenes where the band is pretending to play non-existent instruments, although they do also play their real instruments (including Cain playing his Roland Jupiter-8 "up-the-wall"). It features over fifty camera moves with choreography by Columbia Records Art and Creative Services.

It was reported that on the first day of shooting, there was a cold breeze coming off the Mississippi River next to the wharf. This made filming all the more difficult on the band and Perry, who was seen retreating to his camper to keep warm. This state of affairs was complicated by the presence of Perry's then-girlfriend, Sherrie Swafford, on the set. Not only had the band been told that they could not bring wives or girlfriends to the shoot, the other members hated Swafford and her effect on Perry, which created considerable tension. She was reportedly very jealous of the young woman in the video, local model Margaret Olmstead, and kept demanding Olmstead be taken out of it. "There was a big kicking and screaming session," Cain recalled later. "Sherrie was giving Steve a very bad time about that girl." Perry had also just gotten his hair cut short, which Cain found inexplicable since the singer's previous hairstyle had been "rockin'."

"Here's a band at their commercial peak," says Adam Dubin, director of many well-received videos, "and some idiot decided to film them on a wharf and—here's the worst part—instead of giving them instruments, let them mime playing imaginary instruments. The director should be shot. And the manager should be shot for allowing his band to be put in this position."

A decade later, the video was lampooned on the MTV animated series Beavis and Butt-Head, with the titular characters, both voiced by Mike Judge, opining that the video "sucks" and was "horrible", and ridiculing Perry and Schon's fashion sense. This greatly upset Cain, since he felt Journey's videos had helped make MTV. He called the band's manager repeatedly to ask how they could stop the channel from reairing the segment. In 1999, MTV chose it as 13th on its list of the 25 Worst Videos of All Time.

"I'm at a loss to explain that video," said Cain. "I will never live down those air keyboards. No matter what else I've done in my career, sooner or later people find a way to ask me about the 'Separate Ways' video."

== Stranger Things version ==
For the fourth season of the TV series Stranger Things, which has used songs from the 1980s on its soundtrack, Bryce Miller and Alloy Tracks remixed the song. A fan of the show, Steve Perry heard the remix and told Miller and Troy MacCubbin how much he liked it. Perry told Variety, "I was stunned at how cool it was." Soon after that Perry suggested an extended version which he worked on with Miller.

== Daughtry version ==
"Separate Ways (Worlds Apart)"

Single by Daughtry featuring Lzzy Hale
- Released: January 5, 2023
- Recorded: Autumn 2022
- Length: 5:17
- Label: Dogtree; Alternative Distribution Alliance
- Songwriters: Jonathan Cain; Steve Perry
- Producers: Marti Frederiksen; Scott Stevens

Daughtry featuring Lzzy Hale singles chronology
"Changes are Coming" (2021)	"Separate Ways (Worlds Apart)" (2023)	"Artificial" (2023)

Music video
- "Separate Ways (Worlds Apart) (Official Music Video) ft. Lzzy Hale" on YouTube

In 2023, American rock band Daughtry and Lzzy Hale of Halestorm covered the song to mark the 40th anniversary of the original.

Weekly chart performance for "Separate Ways (Worlds Apart)"
Chart (2023)	Peak position
Bolivia Anglo Airplay (Monitor Latino)	2
Canada Digital Songs (Billboard)	21
Canada Rock (Billboard)	30
US Digital Song Sales (Billboard)	3
US Hot Rock & Alternative Songs (Billboard)	40
US Rock & Alternative Airplay (Billboard)	21
UK Singles Sales (OCC)	49

== Charts ==
=== Weekly charts ===
Weekly chart performance for "Separate Ways (Worlds Apart)"
Chart (1983–1984)	Peak position
Australia (Kent Music Report)	93
Canadian The Record Top Singles	11
Canadian RPM Top Singles	11
South African Singles Chart	17
US Billboard Hot 100	8
US Billboard Hot Mainstream Rock Tracks	1
US Cashbox Top 100	9

2022–2023 weekly chart performance for "Separate Ways (Worlds Apart)"
Chart (2022–2023)	Peak position
Canada Digital Song Sales (Billboard)	38
Canada Digital Song Sales (Billboard) Bryce Miller/Alloy Tracks Remix	17
Global 200 (Billboard)	137
Hungary (Single Top 40)	6
Japan Hot Overseas (Billboard Japan)	4
New Zealand Hot Singles (RMNZ)	21
UK Singles (Official Charts)	95
UK Rock & Metal (Official Charts)	5
US Bubbling Under Hot 100 (Billboard) Bryce Miller/Alloy Tracks Remix	5
US Hot Rock & Alternative Songs (Billboard)	14
US Hot Rock/Alternative Songs (Billboard) Bryce Miller/Alloy Tracks Remix	13

=== Year-end charts ===
Year-end chart performance for "Separate Ways (Worlds Apart)"
Chart (1983)	Position
Canadian RPM Top Singles	73
US Billboard Hot 100	38
US Cashbox Top 100	60

== Certifications ==
Certifications and sales for "Separate Ways (Worlds Apart)"
Region	Certification	Certified units/sales
New Zealand (RMNZ)	Gold	15,000^{‡}
United Kingdom (BPI)	Silver	200,000^{‡}
United States (RIAA)	4× Platinum	4,000,000^{‡}
^{‡} Sales+streaming figures based on certification alone.

== See also ==
- Journey discography
- List of number-one mainstream rock hits (United States)
