= I'll Be Alright Without You =

Single by Journey

from the album Raised on Radio
- B-side: "The Eyes of a Woman"
- Released: November 1986 (US): April 1987 (UK)
- Recorded: 1985–1986
- Genre: Soft rock
- Length: 4:50 (Album version); 4:35 (Greatest Hits edit)
- Label: Columbia
- Songwriters: Steve Perry, Jonathan Cain, Neal Schon
- Producer: Steve Perry

Journey singles chronology
"Girl Can't Help It" (1986)	"I'll Be Alright Without You" (1986)	"Why Can't This Night Go on Forever" (1986)

"I'll Be Alright Without You" is a song by the American rock band Journey included on their 9th studio album, Raised on Radio. The song was written and composed by Jonathan Cain, Steve Perry, and Neal Schon.

== Chart performance ==
"I'll Be Alright Without You" reached #14 on the Billboard Hot 100 and peaked at #7 on the Adult Contemporary chart. On the Mainstream Rock chart, it peaked at #26.

== Personnel ==
Credits for Raised on Radio adapted from liner notes.

Journey

- Steve Perry – lead and backing vocals
- Neal Schon – guitar, backing vocals
- Jonathan Cain – keyboards, backing vocals

Additional musicians

- Randy Jackson – bass
- Larrie Londin – drums

== Certifications ==
Region	Certification	Certified units/sales
United States (RIAA)	Gold	500,000^{‡}
^{‡} Sales+streaming figures based on certification alone.
