= Open Arms (Journey song) =

1982 single by Journey

Single by Journey

from the album Escape and Heavy Metal: Music from the Motion Picture
- B-side: "Little Girl"
- Released: January 8, 1982 (US)
- Recorded: 1981
- Studio: Fantasy Studios (Berkeley, CA)
- Genre: Soft rock
- Length: 3:18
- Label: Columbia
- Songwriters: Steve Perry; Jonathan Cain
- Producers: Kevin Elson; Mike "Clay" Stone

Journey singles chronology
"Don't Stop Believin'" (1981)	"Open Arms" (1982)	"Still They Ride" (1982)

"Open Arms" is a song by American rock band Journey. It was released as a single from the Heavy Metal soundtrack and their 1981 album, Escape. Co-written by band members Steve Perry and Jonathan Cain, the song is a power ballad whose lyrics attempt to renew a drifting relationship. It is one of the band's most recognizable radio hits and their biggest US Billboard Hot 100 hit, reaching number two in February 1982 and holding that position for six weeks (behind "Centerfold" by the J. Geils Band and "I Love Rock 'n' Roll" by Joan Jett and the Blackhearts). It also reached number two in Canada.

"Open Arms" has been covered by various recording artists. American singer-songwriter Mariah Carey enjoyed an international hit with the song in 1996; hers is arguably the best-known version of the song in the United Kingdom, where it reached number 4 on the UK Singles Chart. The song has also been covered by such artists as American singer and songwriter Barry Manilow, R&B group Boyz II Men, American country music legend Dolly Parton, and Canadian singer Celine Dion. It is a favorite on reality television singing competitions as well, being performed by contestants on US shows The Voice and American Idol, and on the UK's The X Factor.

Journey's recording of "Open Arms" has been described as one of the greatest love songs ever written; VH1 named the song as the greatest power ballad of all time. Mike DeGagne of AllMusic described it as "one of rock's most beautiful ballads", which "gleams with an honesty and feel only Steve Perry could muster."

== Journey version ==
Journey recorded "Open Arms" for their seventh studio album, Escape, which was produced by Kevin Elson and Mike Stone. Jonathan Cain had begun writing the song while he was still a member of The Babys, but Babys vocalist/bassist John Waite turned down the melody as "sentimental rubbish." Cain eventually finished the song with Steve Perry during the writing sessions for Escape, changing the key from A to D and changing the melody slightly, but it was almost left off the album; Journey's guitarist Neal Schon reportedly disliked the song because "it was so far removed from anything [Journey] had ever attempted to record before." Drummer Steve Smith recalls that Schon noted that it "sounds kinda Mary Poppins," added to which the other members of the band were against the idea of performing ballads.

In 2005 Perry commented on the emotions he felt while producing Live in Houston 1981: The Escape Tour and listening to the band performing the song 24 years previously: "I had to keep my head down on the console when 'Open Arms' was on. There is one line in the song that I always wanted to be a certain way. I have ideals about certain things. The line 'wanting you near' — I just wanted that line to go up and soar. I wanted it to be heartfelt. Every time it would come by I would just have to keep my head down and try to swallow the lump in my throat. I felt so proud of the song."

In the Journey episode of VH1's Behind the Music, Perry recalls the recording sessions for the song becoming an ordeal; Schon taunted Perry and Cain in the studio. But when the band performed it in concert for the first time during their Escape Tour in the fall of 1981, the audience was thunderstruck, much to Schon's disbelief. After two encores, the band left the stage and Schon suddenly said, "Man, that song really kicked ass!" Perry recalled being incensed at Schon's hypocrisy. "I looked at him, and I wanted to kill him," he later said.

During an episode of the radio show In the Studio with Redbeard devoted to the album Escape, Jonathan Cain said he was ill with a bad cold when he recorded the piano track to "Open Arms" and wanted to re-do the track. Everybody else disagreed and they used the track Cain recorded while "under the weather".

"Open Arms" was used on the soundtrack to the animated Canadian film Heavy Metal (released to theatres in August 1981), and it was released as the third single from Escape in January 1982 in the United States. It was also featured on two occasions during scenes of the 1982 film The Last American Virgin. It became one of Journey's biggest singles there, and the most successful of the five singles released from Escape (only one other, "Who's Crying Now", reached the top five). It stayed at number 2 for six weeks on the Billboard Hot 100, kept from the number one spot by "Centerfold" by the J. Geils Band and "I Love Rock 'n' Roll" by Joan Jett and the Blackhearts, and it was also a top ten hit on Hot Adult Contemporary Tracks. The single was less successful on the Hot Mainstream Rock Tracks, only reaching the top forty.

The song and its status as a power ballad has been remembered years following its original release. One critic praised "Open Arms" as "a lyrical rock ballad and one of the band's best-written songs", while the Associated Press wrote that the song was "fueled by Perry's operatic, high-flying vocal style." It has also been referred to as a "wedding anthem" (in a December 2005 Lumino article), and VH1 placed the song at number 1 on their "25 Greatest Power Ballads" list. AllMusic said "One of rock's most beautiful ballads, 'Open Arms' gleams with an honesty and feel only Steve Perry could muster," and a review of a Journey concert in the Atlanta Journal-Constitution characterized the song as a "classic ballad". Steve Perry told the Boston Globe, "I can't tell you how many times I get a tap on the shoulder and somebody says...'This was my prom song'." Billboard called it a "sentimental ballad featuring some delicate keyboard work and Steve Perry's seductive vocal." The song was later included on Journey's box set Time^{3} (1992) and the compilation album The Essential Journey (2001).

=== In popular culture ===
In 2003 American Idol contestant Clay Aiken performed the song during a key semi-final round of the show, and later in a duet with fellow Idol Kelly Clarkson (the winner from the previous year) on their joint February—April 2004 concert tour. "Open Arms" was included on the set list for Britney Spears' 1999 ...Baby One More Time Tour, and it was also used as the love theme for Japanese director Eiichiro Hasumi's film Umizaru (2004). Matt Stone and Trey Parker, the creators of the animated television comedy South Park, frequently reference and parody Journey and their music in their work. In Episode 132 of South Park, entitled "Erection Day" (2005), a little girl playing piano in a talent competition begins to sing the opening to "Open Arms" ("Lying beside you, here in the dark...") before the scene ends. In the 2007 film I Now Pronounce You Chuck and Larry the song is played during a gay benefit costume party. "Open Arms" is one of twelve greatest hits re-recorded by Journey featuring current lead vocalist Arnel Pineda on the second disc of their latest 2008 album Revelation. The song also appeared in the 1982 film The Last American Virgin as well as a 1982 episode of the US daytime soap opera General Hospital. The song was used in the Season 3 finale of Cobra Kai. The song was also used in Daddy's Home 2 when Dylan kisses his stepsister Adrianna under the mistletoe at the cinema.

== Personnel ==
=== Escape version ===
Sources:

- Steve Perry – lead vocals
- Neal Schon – electric guitar, Roland guitar synthesizer, backing vocals
- Jonathan Cain – piano, backing vocals
- Ross Valory – bass, backing vocals
- Steve Smith – drums

=== Revelation version ===
- Arnel Pineda – lead vocals
- Neal Schon – lead guitar, backing vocals
- Jonathan Cain – keyboards, rhythm guitar, backing vocals
- Ross Valory – bass, backing vocals
- Deen Castronovo – drums, backing vocals

== Charts ==
=== Weekly charts ===
Chart (1982)	Peak position
Australia (Kent Music Report)	43
Canada Top Singles (RPM)	2
Canada Adult Contemporary (RPM)	2
New Zealand (Recorded Music NZ)	49
US Billboard Hot 100	2
US Adult Contemporary (Billboard)	7
US Mainstream Rock Airplay (Billboard)	35
US Cash Box Top 100	1
Chart (2009)	Peak position
UK Singles (Official Charts Company)	169

=== Year-end charts ===
Chart (1982)	Position
Canada Top Singles (RPM)	21
US Top Pop Singles (Billboard)	34
US Cash Box Top 100	21

== Certifications ==
Region	Certification	Certified units/sales
Canada (Music Canada)	Gold	50,000^{^}
New Zealand (RMNZ)	Gold	15,000^{‡}
United States (RIAA)	4× Platinum	4,000,000^{‡}
^{^} Shipments figures based on certification alone.^{‡} Sales+streaming figures based on certification alone.

== Mariah Carey version ==
"Open Arms"

Single by Mariah Carey

from the album Daydream
- B-side: "Slipping Away"; "El Amor Que Soñé"; "I Am Free"
- Released: February 5, 1996
- Recorded: 1995
- Studio: The Hit Factory (New York); Wallyworld (San Rafael)
- Genre: Pop; soul
- Length: 3:30
- Label: Columbia
- Songwriters: Stephen Perry; Jonathan Cain
- Producers: Mariah Carey; Walter Afanasieff

Mariah Carey singles chronology
"Joy to the World" (1995)	"Open Arms" (1996)	"Always Be My Baby" (1996)

Music videos
- "Open Arms" on YouTube; "El Amor Que Soñé" (Spanish version) on YouTube

Mariah Carey co-produced her cover of "Open Arms" with Walter Afanasieff for her fifth studio album Daydream (1995). Carey's career has crossed paths with Journey's: the band's drummer Steve Smith played drums on many of her earlier singles, and its bassist for a short period in the mid-1980s, Randy Jackson, has worked with her for a long time.

Open Arms was released as the third single from Daydream on February 5, 1996, by Columbia Records, in most markets outside the United States. In the United Kingdom, it peaked at number four on the UK Singles Chart and was performed live on BBC's flagship chart television show Top of the Pops. It also reached the top 10 in Bolivia, Panama, Ireland, Israel, New Zealand, and Spain. The single's music video, directed by Larry Jordan, is a live performance of the song by Carey at Madison Square Garden. The music video for the Spanish version of the song, "El Amor Que Soñé", was recorded after the Madison Square Garden show as Carey performed to the studio track.

=== Background and release ===
While recording for the album, Carey expressed the desire to cover the song, saying: "I've always loved Steve Perry's voice, I think he's really an amazing singer. [...] I have a lot of good memories of growing up listening to that song and I always used to sing it and think that it would be a great singer song, kind of a great performance song." Together with Walter Afanasieff, they toned down the song's arrangement, making it a bit glossy, especially in comparison to the "raw and powerful 'One Sweet Day.'" Additionally, with the help of her background singers, Carey added a touch of gospel to the song. Lyrically, the song presents Mariah crying out "in humility for a relationship to be restored."

Released as the album's third single in Australia and Europe, "Open Arms" received a CD single release in February 1996. Columbia released two CDs in the UK on February 5, 1996. One included the Daydream track "I Am Free" and live versions of "Fantasy" and "Vision of Love", while the other comprised the album cuts of "Hero" and "Without You", alongside a radio edit of "I'll Be There". A Spanish version of the song titled "El Amor Que Soñé" ("The Love I Dreamt Of") was also released on Australian's editions of the single, as well as Spanish and Latin American re-editions of Daydream.

=== Critical reception ===
The cover received mixed reviews from critics. Bill Lamb felt it was "simply an uninspired song selection." Stephen Thomas Erlewine of Allmusic also criticized the cover, calling it "second rate". "Open Arms" received a negative review from Stephen Holden as well, who called it a "sobbing remake". Rolling Stone called it an "ill-advised" cover. A Billboard reviewer was more favorable, labelling it a "reverent rendition". Mike Wass of Idolator ranked it at number 4 on his list of Carey's best covers.

=== Commercial performance ===
UK sales for the song stand at 105,000 units.

=== Formats and track listings ===
UK CD (Part 1) / Australian CD/Cassette (Part 1)

1. "Open Arms" - 3:30
2. "I Am Free" - 3:09
3. "Fantasy" (Live from Fantasy: Mariah Carey at Madison Square Garden) - 4:32
4. "Vision of Love" (Live from Fantasy: Mariah Carey at Madison Square Garden) - 3:50

UK CD (Part 2)

1. "Open Arms"
2. "Hero"
3. "Without You"
4. "I'll Be There"

Australian CD/Cassette (Part 2)

1. "Open Arms" - 3:30
2. "Slipping Away" - 4:32
3. "El Amor Que Soñé" - 3:29

UK Cassette Single

1. "Open Arms" - 3:30
2. "I Am Free" - 3:09

European CD Single

1. "Open Arms" - 3:30
2. "Vision of Love" (Live from Fantasy: Mariah Carey at Madison Square Garden) - 3:49

European CD Maxi-Single / European 12" Single

1. "Open Arms" - 3:30
2. "Fantasy" (Live from Fantasy: Mariah Carey at Madison Square Garden) - 4:31
3. "Vision of Love" (live from Fantasy: Mariah Carey at Madison Square Garden) - 3:49
4. "Make It Happen" (live from Fantasy: Mariah Carey at Madison Square Garden) - 4:43

=== Charts ===
==== Weekly charts ====
Weekly chart performance for "Open Arms"
Chart (1996)	Peak position
Australia (ARIA)	27
Belgium (Ultratop 50 Wallonia)	29
European Hot 100 Singles (Music & Media)	39
Europe Adult Contemporary (Music & Media)	12
France (SNEP)	29
France Airplay (Music & Media)	16
Germany (Official German Charts)	65
Iceland (Íslenski Listinn Topp 40)	14
Ireland (IRMA)	7
Israel (Israeli Singles Chart)	2
Lithuania (M-1)	26
Netherlands (Dutch Top 40)	17
Netherlands (Single Top 100)	15
New Zealand (Recorded Music NZ)	8
Scottish Singles Sales (Official Charts)	11
Spain Airplay (Music & Media)	3
Sweden (Sverigetopplistan)	54
Switzerland (Schweizer Hitparade)	30
UK Singles (Official Charts)	4
UK Airplay (Media Monitor)	11
UK Airplay (Music & Media)	9
US CHR/Rhythmic (Radio & Records)	49

Weekly chart performance for "El amor que soñé"
Chart (1996)	Peak position
Bolivia (UPI)	7
Panama (AP)	6

==== Year-end charts ====
Year-end chart performance for "Open Arms"
Chart (1996)	Position
Iceland (Íslenski Listinn Topp 40)	86
Netherlands (Dutch Top 40)	161

== Other cover versions ==
- The Taiwanese boy band 5566 released a cover of "Open Arms" in 2005.
- Country music singer Collin Raye released a cover of "Open Arms" on his compilation album The Best of Collin Raye: Direct Hits in 1997. His version charted at number 70 on the Hot Country Songs charts that year based on unsolicited airplay.
- In 2016, South Korean singer and musical actress, Jung Yoo-ji sang Mariah Carey's rendition of the song during her special appearance at the Chinese version of the show "I Am The Singer".

== Live cover performances ==
- Solid Gold (season 2) Host Andy Gibb performed the song on January 30, 1982
- Korean-American singer Lena Park performed the song on MBC's 'Wednesday Arts Stage' in 2002.
- American Idol contestant Clay Aiken performed the song during a key semi-final round of the show in 2003, and later in a duet with fellow Idol Kelly Clarkson (the winner from the previous year) on their joint February—April 2004 concert tour.
- Australian Idol season 3 finalist Anne Robertson performed this song on the show in 2005 for the 1980s theme night.
- American Idol contestant Elliott Yamin performed the song in 2006 on season 5.
- 2008 The X Factor finalist Daniel Evans recorded a version of the song which was released as his debut single on January 25, 2010, as a digital download.
- The X Factor contestant Joe McElderry performed his version of "Open Arms" as his second song on Semi-Final night, on December 5, 2009. All 4 judges hailed the performance on the night, with Louis Walsh saying that if Joe released that song tomorrow, he would have a Number 1 single the very next day. This performance saw Joe through to the Grand Final of the X Factor.
- 2011 to 2015, Celine Dion performs "Open Arms" at the start of her Las Vegas show Celine.
- Mexican band Tobby covered the song, as "Quiero Amar" (English: "I Want to Love"), whose translation was made by Menny Carrasco, a member of the group.
- The Voice contestant Jermaine Paul performed the song in 2012 on Season 2 of The Voice.
- The song has also been covered live by Korean singer Younha and Taiwanese boy band 5566.
- Britney Spears performed the song at her cousin's wedding in 1996 when she was 15; this video eventually led to her getting a record contract. She also performed the song on her ...Baby One More Time Tour.
- The song has been covered live by several SM Entertainment artists including EXO.
- The song has also been covered by Philippine singer Aiza Seguerra.
- It was covered by the band Low and released on their box set A Lifetime of Temporary Relief: 10 Years of B-Sides and Rarities.

== Sources ==
- Nickson, Chris (1998), Mariah Carey revisited: her story, St. Martin's Press, ISBN 978-0-312-19512-0
