= Faithfully (song) =

Single by Journey

from the album Frontiers
- B-side: "Frontiers"; "Back Talk"; "Edge of the Blade"; "Send Her My Love"
- Released: April 1983
- Recorded: 1982
- Genre: Soft rock
- Length: 4:24
- Label: Columbia
- Songwriter: Jonathan Cain
- Producers: Kevin Elson; Mike Stone

Journey singles chronology
| "Separate Ways (Worlds Apart)" (1983) | "Faithfully" (1983) | "After the Fall" (1983) |

Music video
- Faithfully on YouTube

"Faithfully" is a song by American rock band Journey, released in 1983 as the second single from their album Frontiers. The song was written by keyboardist Jonathan Cain. It peaked at number 12 on the Billboard Hot 100, giving the band their second consecutive top-twenty hit from Frontiers. It has gone on to become one of the band's most recognizable hits and has enjoyed lasting popularity. In 2008, Classic Rock critic Paul Elliott called "Faithfully" "the greatest power ballad of all time".

== Lyrics and composition ==
The song was written by Journey keyboard player Jonathan Cain. He began writing the song with only the lyrics "highway run into the midnight sun" on a paper napkin while on a tour bus headed to Saratoga Springs, New York. The next day, he completed the song in full in only a half-hour. Decades later, Cain connected the song's quick genesis to his Christian faith: "I'd never had a song come to me so quickly [...] it was anointed, supernatural." Neal Schon also commented on the song's inception: "[Cain] told me he got the melody out of a dream. I wish something like that would happen to me." Cain finished composing the song on a backstage grand piano at the Saratoga Performing Arts Center, where the band performed it for the first time. According to the liner notes in Journey's Time3 compilation, Cain paid tribute to road manager Pat Morrow and stage manager Benny Collins when he wrote "we all need the clowns to make us smile." He characterized the song as a "road song," remarking, "You know I'm being a good dog out here — don't worry about it."

"Faithfully" is written in the key of B major with a tempo of 65 beats per minute in common time. The song follows a chord progression of B – G♯m – F# – E, and the vocals span from G♯_{4} to B_{5}. The song describes the relationship of a "music man" with his wife, and the difficulties of raising and maintaining a family and staying faithful to his wife while touring. However, he suggests that he gets the "joy of rediscovering" her, and insists "I'm forever yours... Faithfully." Cain wrote this song about the difficulty of being a married man as well as a touring musician. Soon after the song's release, he and his wife divorced. Like "Rosanna" by Toto, "Faithfully" contains lyrics delivered by the lead singer but written by another member of the band, which led many fans to believe Steve Perry wrote the song about a particular woman.

== Music video ==
The music video did not pioneer, but did popularize, a then-unique "life on tour" theme parallel to the song's lyrics, showing the band's performances in different venues and their travels around the country. Steve Perry can be seen shaving his short-lived but talked-about moustache in the video. This video utilized footage from the documentary video Journey: Frontiers and Beyond narrated by John Facenda, voice of NFL Films, shortly before his death in 1984. The "road video" concept was later used by several other bands and artists, including Bon Jovi, Guns N' Roses, Genesis, Mötley Crüe, Poison and Richard Marx. (The first such "road video" is believed to be "Silly Love Songs" by Paul McCartney and Wings in 1976, but it rarely, if ever, appeared on MTV.)

== Legacy ==
Classic Rock critic Paul Elliott named "Faithfully" as "the greatest power ballad of all time", while Nate Larson of HuffPost ranked it as the seventh-best love song in history.

Bryan Adams opened for Journey on their 1983 Frontiers Tour, and during that time wrote the song "Heaven", which was heavily influenced by "Faithfully". The "Heaven" recording features Journey drummer Steve Smith.

After recording the song "Purple Rain", Prince phoned Cain and, worried it might be too similar to "Faithfully", asked him to listen to it. Cain reassured Prince by telling him that the songs only shared the same four chords.

== Charts ==
=== Weekly charts ===
| Chart (1983–1984) | Peak position |
|---|---|
| Canada 50 Singles (RPM) | 36 |
| US Billboard Hot 100 | 12 |

=== Year-end charts ===
| Chart (1983) | Rank |
|---|---|
| US Top Pop Singles (Billboard) | 81 |

== Certifications ==
| Region | Certification | Certified units/sales |
|---|---|---|
| New Zealand (RMNZ) | Gold | 15,000^{‡} |
| United Kingdom (BPI) | Silver | 200,000^{‡} |
| United States (RIAA) | 6× Platinum | 6,000,000^{‡} |
^{‡} Sales+streaming figures based on certification alone.

== Appearances in other media ==
- This song was used during a bar scene in the film Talladega Nights: The Ballad of Ricky Bobby.
- The song was used in the first season episode of Glee, "Journey to Regionals", as a featured duet between Finn Hudson (Cory Monteith) and Rachel Berry (Lea Michele) in their glee club Regionals championship setlist. It peaked at number 37 on the Billboard Hot 100 chart.
- The song is sampled in the end of Girl Talk's album Feed the Animals.
- The song appeared in the film Bucky Larson: Born to Be a Star (2011).
- The song was used in the episode "Dance Party USA" (season 2, episode 22) on ABC's The Goldbergs, where Barry, Erica, and Lainey appeared on Dance Party USA.
- It is sung in the film Here Comes the Boom (2012).

== Notable cover versions ==
- In 2010, alt-country band Clem Snide covered the song for the first season of The A.V. Club's A.V. Undercover web series.
- In November 2023, Miley Cyrus covered the song live during a private gig at Chateau Marmont.
- In May 2025, Steve Perry collaborated with Willie Nelson to re-record the song to celebrate the 40th anniversary of Farm Aid.
