= Don't Stop Believin' =

1981 single by Journey

Single by Journey

from the album Escape
- B-side: "Natural Thing"
- Released: October 19, 1981
- Recorded: 1981
- Studio: Fantasy Studios (Berkeley, California)
- Genre: Arena rock
- Length: 4:11
- Label: Columbia
- Songwriters: Jonathan Cain; Steve Perry; Neal Schon
- Producers: Kevin Elson; Mike Stone

Journey singles chronology
"Who's Crying Now" (1981)	"Don't Stop Believin'" (1981)	"Open Arms" (1982)

Audio sample
- "Don't Stop Believin'": file; help

Audio video
- "Don't Stop Believin'" on YouTube

"Don't Stop Believin'" is a song by American rock band Journey. It was released in October 1981 as the second single from the group's seventh studio album, Escape (1981), released through Columbia Records. "Don't Stop Believin'" shares writing credits between the band's vocalist Steve Perry, guitarist Neal Schon, and keyboardist Jonathan Cain. It is a mid-tempo rock anthem and power ballad.

At the dawn of the 1980s, Journey was becoming one of the most successful rock acts of the era. The band added Cain on keyboards before entering the studio to record Escape. Cain had kept the song title from encouragement his father gave him as a struggling musician living on Los Angeles' Sunset Boulevard. The song is unusual in that its chorus does not arrive until the song is nearly finished; its structure consists of two pre-choruses and three verses before it arrives at its central hook. The band recorded the song in one take at Fantasy Studios in Berkeley, California.

A top-10 hit in North America in 1981, "Don't Stop Believin'" became the group's signature song and has continued to endure over the years. Decades after its release, in 2012 it became the best-selling digital track from the twentieth century, with over seven million downloads by 2017. Critics acclaimed its anthemic qualities; music magazine Rolling Stone ranked it among its 500 Greatest Songs of All Time. In 2022, the single was selected by the Library of Congress for preservation in the United States National Recording Registry as being "culturally, historically, or aesthetically significant." Cover versions have included the cast of the American comedy-drama Glee in 2009, which outperformed the original internationally.

== Background ==
By 1980, the Californian rock outfit Journey was on its way to becoming one of the most successful acts of the era. After discarding its roots in progressive rock, the group hired vocalist Steve Perry and smoothed out its sound. The band had notched several domestic top-25 hits with "Lovin', Touchin', Squeezin'" and "Any Way You Want It". Original keyboardist Gregg Rolie, with the group since its progressive days, amicably departed in 1980, leaving the foursome without one of its signature elements. Rolie recommended the band invite Jonathan Cain of British rockers the Babys to be his permanent replacement, who accepted and joined the band as it prepared to record its next album, Escape (1981).

To prepare for writing its next effort, Journey rented a warehouse in Oakland, California, where they worked daily to complete arrangements and develop new ideas. Cain came up with the song's title and hook; it stemmed from something his father had frequently told him back when he had been a struggling musician living on Los Angeles' Sunset Boulevard. At that time Cain was unsuccessful and ready to give up, and each time he would call home in despair, his father would tell him, "Don't stop believing or you're done, dude." Guitarist Neal Schon invented the song's distinctive bass line, and Perry suggested Cain write a driving synthesizer piece to complement that bass line. Drummer Steve Smith added a standard rock backbeat behind that, and instructed Schon to play 16th note arpeggios over the rest of the instrumentation, as though he were a "train" guiding the song in its direction.

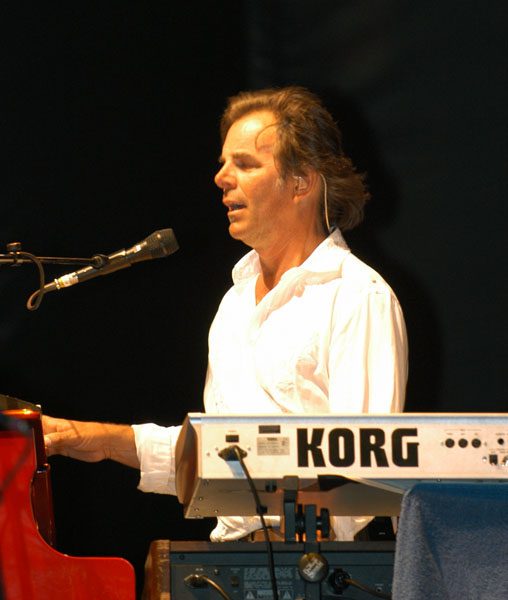
Jonathan Cain, the band's newest member, developed the song's title.

This motif lyrically inspired the song as well. Cain and Perry thought the imagery brought to mind a story of two people leaving behind past lives in their hometown and boarding a midnight train to anywhere else. Perry liked the concept that the characters be a girl from a small town and a boy raised in the city. "We felt that every young person has a dream and sometimes where you grow up isn't where you're destined to be," Cain said. They copied the day's progress to cassette tapes and took them home for further review. Smith felt a regular rock beat wouldn't suit the entire song, so he supplemented it with melodic, syncopated additions on the tom-toms and ride cymbal bell, increasing its complexity as the song builds. The song was built backwards, as the title hook was the only lyric the band had developed initially.

The band recorded the song at Fantasy Studios in Berkeley, California. Perry had a cold on the day of recording and was unable to make it, so its instrumental was tracked without him. The musicians found the song's tempo and varying sections difficult to record, especially Cain and bassist Ross Valory's intro. Co-producer Mike Stone turned on a verbal click track for the group to practise to; after about twenty minutes, they turned the machine off and recorded the song live in one take. Perry rejoined Journey the next week and also completed his vocals mainly in one take. Altogether, the song and its corresponding album came together under its budget and in about two months. Cain was grateful that Perry gave his ideas equal weight given his status as a new member of the band.

== Musical style ==
=== Composition ===
While a majority of songs have a refrain that is repeated several times throughout the song, the true chorus to "Don't Stop Believin'" (as well as the first mention of its title) is not heard until the end of the song, with only 0:50 left. The song's writers designated the musically similar sections before the chorus as the "pre-chorus". The song's structure is:

1. Introduction (instrumental) (0:00–0:17)
2. Verse 1 (0:17–0:49)
3. Instrumental (0:49–1:05)
4. Verse 2 (half-length) (1:05–1:20)
5. Pre-chorus 1 (1:20–1:54)
6. Instrumental (1:54–2:01)
7. Verse 3 (2:01–2:33)
8. Pre-chorus 2 (2:33–3:05)
9. Instrumental (chorus) (3:05–3:21)
10. Chorus until fade (3:21–4:11)

"Don't Stop Believin'" has been described as an arena rock anthem. The song is played in the key of E major at a tempo of 118 beats per minute. The vocal range is E_{4}–C#_{5}. The chord progression, played by the piano in the introduction and continued throughout most of the song, is eight chords long, following a I–V–vi–IV–I–V–iii–IV progression.

=== Lyrics ===
While the lyrics mention being "born and raised in south Detroit", there is no place in the Detroit, Michigan area commonly called "South Detroit". The city lies mainly on the north bank of the Detroit River, and directly south of its downtown area lies the Canadian city of Windsor, Ontario. Steve Perry has said, "I tried north Detroit, I tried east and west and it didn't sing, but south Detroit sounded so beautiful. I loved the way it sounded, only to find out later it's actually Canada." Jon Cain said of writing the song, "... the 'South Detroit' thing I got a lot of flack [sic] for. Because there was no South Detroit. And I said, 'Because it’s a mystical place, it doesn't exist!' It's the city of possibilities in your mind. That's what South Detroit is. So, leave it alone." Another lyric, "streetlight people living just to find emotion", came from Perry watching people walking in the streets of Detroit at night after a show.

== Release ==
The song reached number eight on Billboard's Mainstream Rock chart, and number nine on the Billboard Hot 100 chart. It sold over a million copies in vinyl. It is the number one paid digital download song originally released in the 20th century, and was also the 72nd most downloaded song of 2008, and 84th most downloaded song of 2009 in the store, over 27 years after its release. On August 31, 2009, the song topped the 3 million mark in paid downloads. It is the best-selling digital song from a pre-digital-era, and it was also the best-selling rock song in digital history until it was overtaken by Imagine Dragons' "Radioactive" in January 2014. It was placed just outside the top twenty best selling digital songs of all time in September 2010. It has sold over 7 million digital units in the US as of July 2017, and was certified eighteen-times Platinum by RIAA.

"Don't Stop Believin'" has entered other charts across the world in recent years, following a gain in popularity. In Ireland, the song peaked at number 4, and remains one of the most popular rock tracks and in the top ten most downloaded songs in the country. It peaked at number 25 in Sweden after many chart runs, and at number 50 in the Netherlands.

=== UK chart success ===
The song was released in the United Kingdom in December 1981 and peaked only at number 62. "Don't Stop Believin'", never re-released as a physical single in the UK, retained a cult following and re-entered the UK Singles Chart in February 2009 at number 94 due to digital downloads. On November 1, 2009, following a performance on The X Factor, "Don't Stop Believin'" re-entered the chart peaking at number 52, and it rose to number 19 a week later. The song stayed in the charts for three weeks, before dropping out of the top 40. On December 20 that year, "Don't Stop Believin'" re-entered the chart at number nine after the song was performed again on The X Factor. The song remained in the top 10 for another seven weeks in 2010, hitting a peak of number six in the process.

In early 2010, it was announced that the song had been the 65th best-selling single of 2009, this nearly three decades after its initial release. "Don't Stop Believin'" spent a total of 21 non-consecutive weeks in the top 40 during its November 2009 – April 2010 run. "Don't Stop Believin'" was the 25th best-selling track of 2010, selling just over 435,000 copies. It re-entered the charts in 2011, 2012 and 2013 and to date has spent 95 weeks in the top 100.

== Critical reception ==
The song was a commercial success and is known for its widespread use, but the song (along with Escape by Journey), initially received poor critical reviews (being criticized for its slick, inauthentic and derivative nature in both the musical and lyrical areas), but it has been retrospectively acknowledged as a staple of classic rock radio and 1980s rock music; for instance, Billboard called it an "uptempo, melodic track" and praised the "fluid guitar and vocal." Record World said that the "piano intro anticipates a powerful rock chorus for maximum airplay." Mike DeGagne of AllMusic has described "Don't Stop Believin'" as a "perfect rock song" and an "anthem", featuring "one of the best opening keyboard riffs in rock."

In 2012 it was the best-selling digital track from the 20th century, with over seven million copies sold in the United States by 2017. In 2021, it was ranked No. 133 on Rolling Stone's 500 Greatest Songs of All Time, and received the Grammy Hall of Fame award.

== In popular culture ==
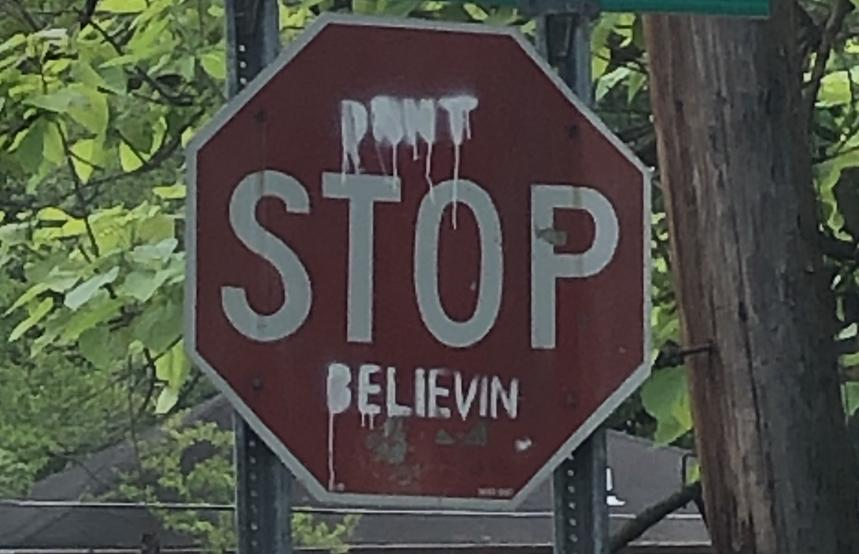
Stop sign graffitied to read as the title of the song

The song gained press coverage and a sharp growth in popularity after its use in The Chicago White Sox 2005 World Series championship and in 2007, the famous final scene of HBO's The Sopranos series finale "Made in America".

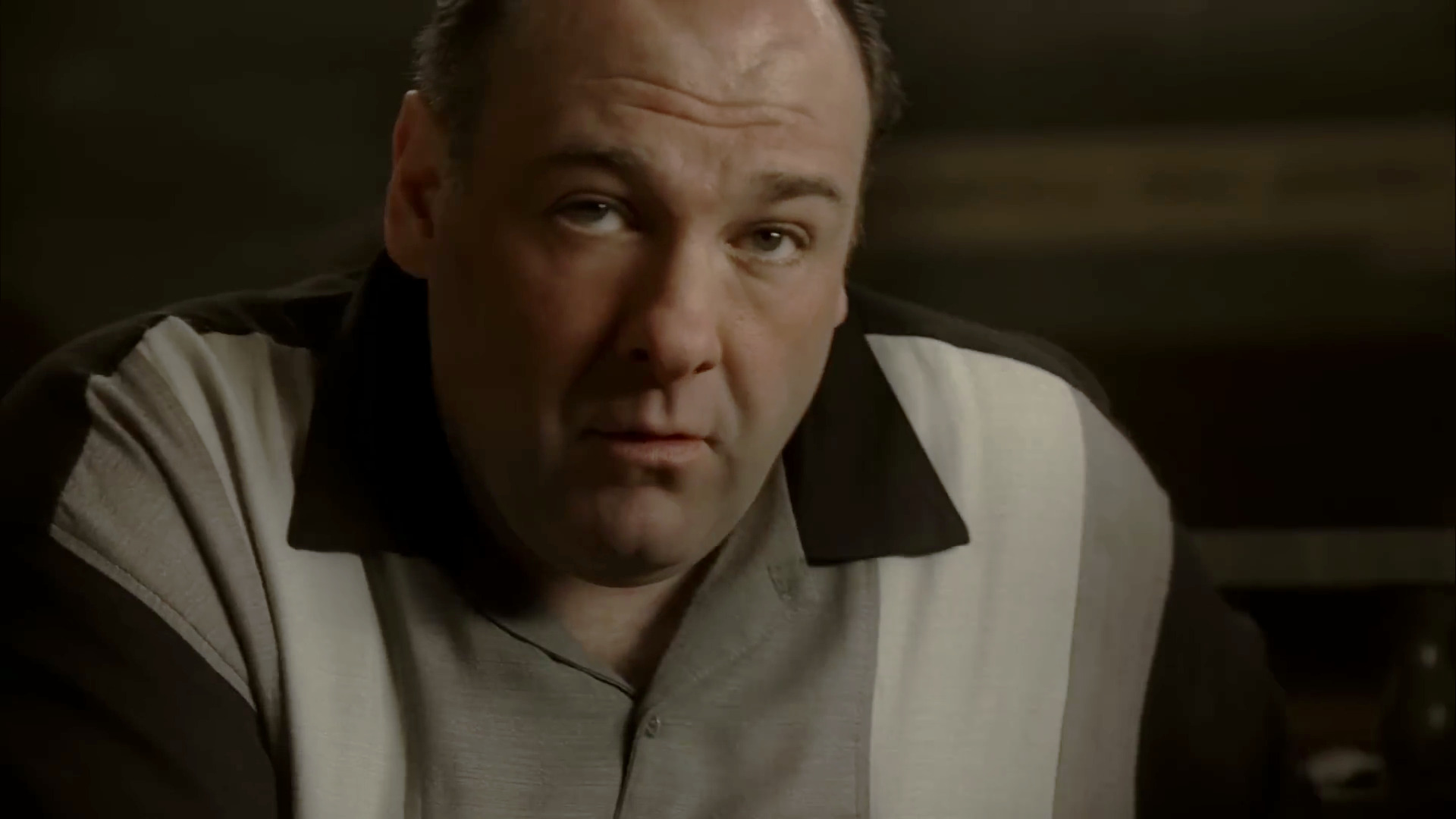
The final shot of The Sopranos, featuring Tony Soprano looking to see who is entering the restaurant.

Steve Perry was initially hesitant to allow the song to be used in The Sopranos but later agreed. Digital downloads of the song soared following the episode's airing, and the exposure motivated the band members to overcome the struggles they were having at the time and find a replacement lead singer after former lead singer Steve Augeri's departure.

"Don't Stop Believin'" has for years been commonly played at Detroit Red Wings home games. During the last minutes of playoff victories, the volume is lowered during the "born and raised in south Detroit" line, which is instead sung by home fans. It was played at the closing ceremony of the Red Wings long-time home Joe Louis Arena in 2017. It is also used at other Detroit sporting events.

The song is played during the 8th inning of every San Francisco Giants home game. Steve Perry is a Giants season ticket holder and memorably led the crowd in the song during a game in the World Series in 2014. In addition, after the Giants won the 2010 World Series, Fox Sports used the song to close out their postgame coverage of the fifth and deciding game of the series.

"Don't Stop Believin'" got a boost when it was used as the closing number in Rock of Ages, a jukebox musical featuring hits of the 1980s. The show ran on Broadway from 2009 to 2015, and in 2012 was made into a movie starring Tom Cruise.

The song is used in professional wrestling by Silas Young as his entrance music on the independent circuit, though due to music rights issues he's used in-house music commissioned by Ring of Honor when wrestling for that promotion.

In 2020, "Don't Stop Believin'" was used in a Toyota Hilux commercial. In the commercial, With the help of his Hilux, a dad retraces his steps on an epic journey to help his daughter find her lost toy.

In 2024, the song was sung by Richard Goodall in America's Got Talent; he won the Golden Buzzer and went on to win the competition and $1 million dollar prize for his performance. The song was also featured in the trailers of Anchorman: The Legend Continues, Harold and the Purple Crayon, and Spellbound.

In the middle of the 7th inning, at Party Animals home games in Banana Ball, everyone gets their phone lights (replaced by light-up wristbands in 2026) up in the air, as they sing a live cover of Don't Stop Believin' performed by the official band of the Party Animals, Party Down.

== Personnel ==
Escape version

- Steve Perry – lead vocals
- Neal Schon – electric guitars, backing vocals
- Jonathan Cain – piano, ARP Omni, backing vocals
- Ross Valory – bass, backing vocals
- Steve Smith – drums

Revelation live version

- Arnel Pineda – lead vocals
- Ross Valory – bass, background vocals
- Jonathan Cain – keyboards, background vocals
- Neal Schon – guitars, background vocals
- Deen Castronovo – drums and percussion, background vocals

== Charts ==
=== Weekly charts ===
Weekly chart performance for "Don't Stop Believin'"
Chart (1981–1982)	Peak position
Australia (Kent Music Report)	100
Canada Top Singles (RPM)	9
Netherlands (Single Top 100)	50
UK Singles (Official Charts)	62
US Billboard Hot 100	9
US Adult Contemporary (Billboard)	9
US Mainstream Rock Airplay (Billboard)	8
Chart (2007)	Peak position
Ireland (IRMA)	4
UK Singles (Official Charts)	97
Chart (2008)	Peak position
UK Singles (Official Charts)	93
Chart (2009)	Peak position
UK Singles (Official Charts)	71
Chart (2010)	Peak position
Netherlands (Single Top 100)	68
Sweden (Sverigetopplistan)	25
UK Singles (Official Charts)	6
Chart (2011)	Peak position
UK Singles (Official Charts)	74
Chart (2012)	Peak position
UK Singles (Official Charts)	88
Chart (2013)	Peak position
Austria (Ö3 Austria Top 40)	70
UK Singles (Official Charts)	44
Chart (2015)	Peak position
Sweden (Sverigetopplistan)	96
Chart (2017)	Peak position
Sweden (Sverigetopplistan)	79
Chart (2018)	Peak position
Sweden (Sverigetopplistan)	97
Chart (2022)	Peak position
Australia (ARIA)	83
South Africa (RISA)	99
Chart (2024–2026)	Peak position
Australia (ARIA)	47
Austria (Ö3 Austria Top 40)	22
Canada Hot 100 (Billboard)	34
Germany (GfK)	32
Global 200 (Billboard)	44
Ireland (IRMA)	21
Norway (IFPI Norge)	97
Portugal (AFP)	133
Switzerland (Schweizer Hitparade)	43
UK Singles (Official Charts)	27

=== Year-end charts ===
1981 year-end chart performance for "Don't Stop Believin'"
Chart (1981)	Position
US Cashbox Top 100	58

1982 year-end chart performance for "Don't Stop Believin'"
Chart (1982)	Position
US Top Pop Singles (Billboard)	73

2009 year-end chart performance for "Don't Stop Believin'"
Chart (2009)	Position
UK Singles (OCC)	65

2010 year-end chart performance for "Don't Stop Believin'"
Chart (2010)	Position
European Hot 100 Singles	67
Sweden (Sverigetopplistan)	54
UK Singles (OCC)	24

2021 year-end chart performance for "Don't Stop Believin'"
Chart (2021)	Position
Global 200 (Billboard)	111

2022 year-end chart performance for "Don't Stop Believin'"
Chart (2022)	Position
Global 200 (Billboard)	143

2024 year-end chart performance for "Don't Stop Believin'"
Chart (2024)	Position
Australia (ARIA)	72
Austria (Ö3 Austria Top 40)	65
Germany (GfK)	89
Global 200 (Billboard)	143
Sweden (Sverigetopplistan)	99
Switzerland (Schweizer Hitparade)	87
UK Singles (OCC)	76

2025 year-end chart performance for "Don't Stop Believin'"
Chart (2025)	Position
Australia (ARIA)	95
Austria (Ö3 Austria Top 40)	23
Belgium (Ultratop 50 Flanders)	139
Germany (GfK)	34
Global 200 (Billboard)	66
Netherlands (Single Top 100)	82
Sweden (Sverigetopplistan)	80
Switzerland (Schweizer Hitparade)	91
UK Singles (OCC)	78

=== Decade-end charts ===
Decade-end chart performance for "Don't Stop Believin'"
Chart (2010–2019)	Position
UK Singles (OCC)	87

=== All-time charts ===
All-time chart performance for "Don't Stop Believin'"
Chart (1981–2013)	Position
UK Download (OCC)	12

== Certifications ==
Certifications for "Don't Stop Believin'"
Region	Certification	Certified units/sales
Australia (ARIA)	13× Platinum	910,000^{‡}
Denmark (IFPI Danmark)	2× Platinum	180,000^{‡}
Germany (BVMI)	2× Platinum	1,200,000^{‡}
Italy (FIMI) sales since 2009	Platinum	50,000^{‡}
Mexico (AMPROFON)	Gold	30,000^{*}
New Zealand (RMNZ)	11× Platinum	330,000^{‡}
Portugal (AFP)	3× Platinum	30,000^{‡}
Spain (Promusicae)	2× Platinum	120,000^{‡}
United Kingdom (BPI)	7× Platinum	4,200,000^{‡}
United States (RIAA) Physical	Gold	500,000^{^}
United States (RIAA) Mastertone	Platinum	1,000,000^{*}
United States (RIAA) Digital	18× Platinum	18,000,000^{‡}
^{*} Sales figures based on certification alone.^{^} Shipments figures based on certification alone.^{‡} Sales+streaming figures based on certification alone.

== Glee cast version ==
"Don't Stop Believin'"

Single by Glee cast

from the album Glee: The Music, Volume 1
- Released: May 19, 2009
- Recorded: 2009
- Genre: Pop
- Length: 3:50
- Label: Columbia
- Songwriters: Steve Perry, Jonathan Cain, Neal Schon
- Producers: Ryan Murphy, Adam Anders

Glee cast singles chronology
"Don't Stop Believin'" (2009)	"Rehab" (2009)

Audio video
- "Don't Stop Believin'" on YouTube

"Don't Stop Believin'"

Song by Glee cast

from the album Glee: The Music, Journey to Regionals
- Released: June 8, 2010
- Recorded: 2010
- Genre: Pop
- Length: 3:44
- Label: Columbia
- Songwriters: Jonathan Cain, Steve Perry, Neal Schon
- Producers: Ryan Murphy, Adam Anders

Audio video
- "Don't Stop Believin'" on YouTube

"Don't Stop Believin'" was recorded by the cast of American television series, Glee. It was performed, in whole or in part, in six different episodes of the series, ranging from the first episode to the 120th (second last) episode. The song was performed to close out the first episode, "Pilot" (May 2009) by principal cast members Cory Monteith (Finn Hudson), Lea Michele (Rachel Berry), Chris Colfer (Kurt Hummel), Amber Riley (Mercedes Jones), Kevin McHale (Artie Abrams) and Jenna Ushkowitz (Tina Cohen-Chang). This arrangement, which became the first single released from the soundtrack of the series, Glee: The Music, Volume 1, was adapted from Petra Haden's version. A portion of the song was performed again in the first season's fifth episode, "The Rhodes Not Taken" (September 2009), with Monteith and Dianna Agron as soloists.

A second version was performed by the cast in the first season's finale episode, "Journey to Regionals" (June 2010), for the glee club's Regionals competition; this version is included in the EP soundtrack, Glee: The Music, Journey to Regionals. This version, performed by Monteith, Michele, Colfer, Riley, McHale, Ushkowitz, Mark Salling and Naya Rivera, earned a nomination in December 2010 for the 2011 Grammy Award for Best Pop Performance by a Duo or Group with Vocals – the only song from Glee ever nominated for a Grammy.

A third version was performed by Lea Michele as Rachel Berry in the nineteenth episode of the fourth season of the show, "Sweet Dreams" (April 2013), joined (in her imagination) by the rest of the original six, making it the last new musical performance by Finn Hudson, as actor Cory Monteith died three months later; this version was released as a single April 23, 2013.

A fourth version was performed, by ten of the original twelve members (missing Monteith as Finn Hudson and Dijon Talton as Matt Rutherford), seven more current members and Mr. Schuester, in the thirteenth episode of the fifth season, "New Directions" (March 2014). The song's sixth, and final, performance on the series was a reprise of the six-member "Pilot" version, which featured in the second last episode of the series, "2009" (March 2015).

Released as a digital download on June 2, 2009, the song performed well in the United States, Ireland, the United Kingdom and Australia, where it charted within the top five of their national charts. The cast performance of "Don't Stop Believin'" was certified gold in the US in October 2009 and platinum in March 2011, achieving over 1,000,000 digital sales, and platinum in Australia, with sales of over 70,000. It remains the most popular recording in the show's history, having sold 1,422,000 copies in the United States alone.

=== Critical reception ===
Aly Semigan of Entertainment Weekly praised the song stating "Fox's Glee put the ultimate earworm back in its rightful place." She also stated: "even if you aren't one for show choirs (which, is quite frankly, shocking), it's pretty damn hard to resist." Semigan also compared it to the original version stating "it sounds slightly different in this Freaks and Geeks meets High School Musical pilot, but it's a good kind of different."

=== Chart performance ===
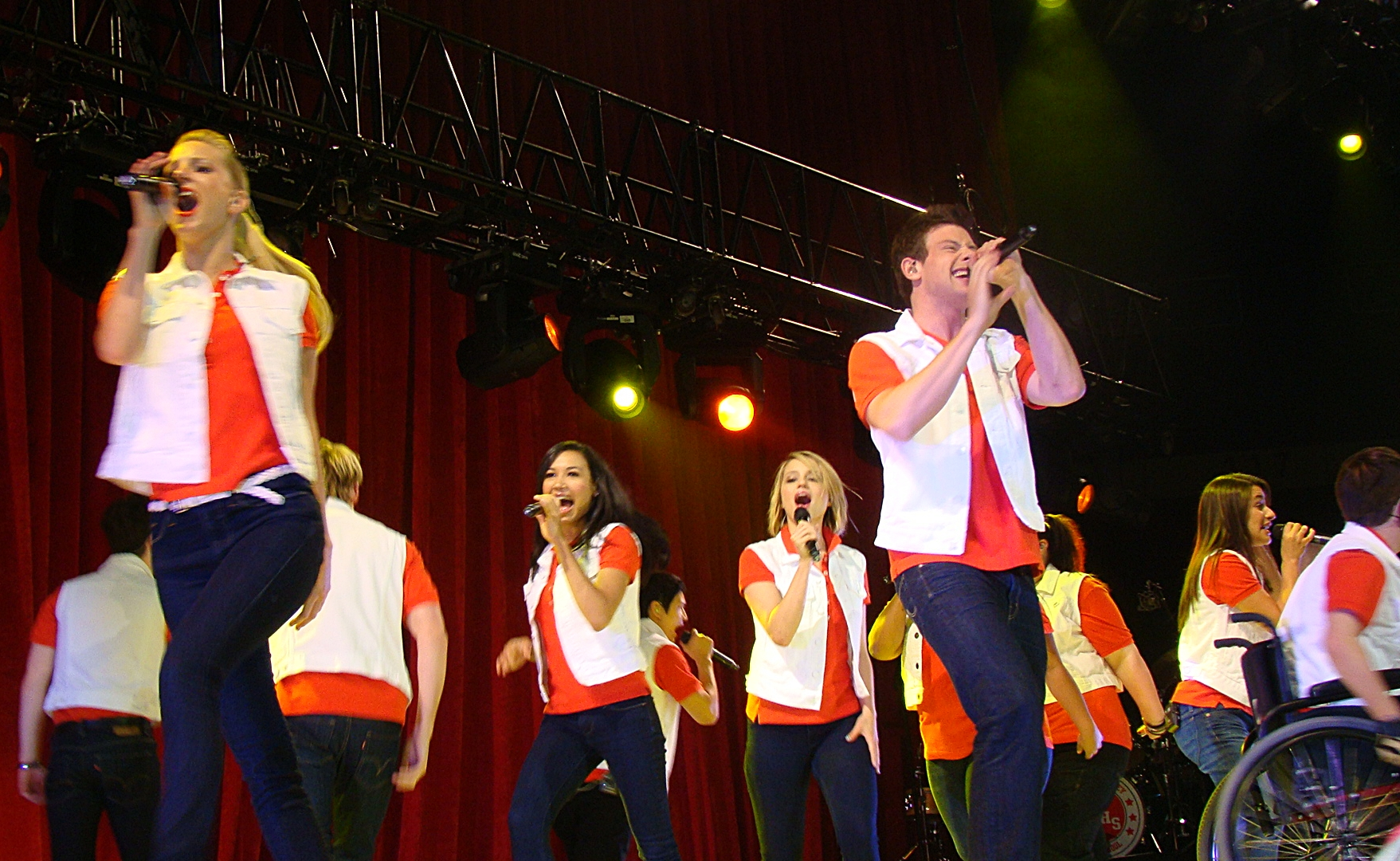
Glee Cast performing the song during Glee Live! In Concert!

In the United States, the song debuted at No. 4 on the Billboard Hot 100 on the week dated June 6, 2009 with sales of 177,000 copies in its first week, behind Black Eyed Peas's "Boom Boom Pow", Lady Gaga's "Poker Face" and Jamie Foxx's "Blame It", respectively the number one, number two and number three on the chart. The song received certification Platinum by RIAA for more 1.4 million copies of digital sold, which is also their best-selling song to date.

=== Track listings ===
- Digital download
1. "Don't Stop Believin'" – 3:50
- German CD single
1. "Don't Stop Believin'" – 3:52
2. "Rehab" – 3:26

=== Charts ===
Weekly charts
Chart (2009–2011)	Peak position
Australia (ARIA)	5
Australia Hitseekers (ARIA)	1
Austria (Ö3 Austria Top 40)	68
Canada Hot 100 (Billboard)	37
France (SNEP)	48
Germany (GfK)	50
Ireland (IRMA)	4
Italy (FIMI)	46
Japan Adult Contemporary Airplay (Billboard)	2
Netherlands (Single Top 100)	91
New Zealand (Recorded Music NZ)	16
Portugal Digital Songs (Billboard)	9
Scottish Singles Sales (Official Charts)	2
Switzerland (Schweizer Hitparade)	74
UK Singles (Official Charts)	2
US Billboard Hot 100	4
US Pop 100 (Billboard)	18

Year-end charts
Chart (2009)	Position
Australia (ARIA)	69
Chart (2010)	Position
European Hot 100 Singles	82
UK Singles (The Official Charts Company)	22

=== Certifications ===
Sales and certifications
Region	Certification	Certified units/sales
Australia (ARIA)	Platinum	70,000^{^}
Mexico (AMPROFON)	Gold	30,000^{*}
United Kingdom (BPI)	Platinum	600,000^{‡}
United States (RIAA)	Platinum	1,000,000^{^}
^{^} Shipments figures based on certification alone.^{‡} Sales+streaming figures based on certification alone.

== LadBaby version ==
"Don't Stop Me Eatin'"

Single by LadBaby
- Released: December 18, 2020
- Recorded: 2020
- Label: Frtyfve
- Songwriters: Steve Perry; Neal Schon; Jonathan Cain

LadBaby singles chronology
"I Love Sausage Rolls" (2019)	"Don't Stop Me Eatin'" (2020)	"Sausage Rolls for Everyone" (2021)

Music video
- "Don't Stop Me Eatin'" on YouTube

In December 2020, English blogger couple LadBaby released a comedy version of the song titled "Don't Stop Me Eatin'" with a sausage roll theme as a charity single whose proceeds go to The Trussell Trust. It was released as a single on December 18, 2020. It was officially announced as the Christmas number one on December 25, 2020, becoming LadBaby's third consecutive Christmas number one in the UK.

=== Version with Ronan Keating ===
A separate alternate version was recorded by Ronan Keating and was credited to LadBaby and Ronan Keating, but actually the vocals were by Keating and LadBaby's wife Roxanne.

=== Background ===
In December 2020, LadBaby announced their bid for the Official Christmas number one for the third time. As with their previous two singles, "We Built This City" and "I Love Sausage Rolls", all proceeds from the single went to The Trussell Trust.

=== Charts ===
Chart (2020–2021)	Peak position
Global 200 (Billboard)	38
Hungary (Single Top 40)	8
Ireland (IRMA)	93
New Zealand Hot Singles (RMNZ)	12
UK Singles (Official Charts)	1
UK Indie (Official Charts)	1

== Other versions ==
=== Joe McElderry version ===
In 2009, Joe McElderry performed the song on the 6th UK series of The X Factor on week 4, and again in the finals. This helped the original version get back in the UK charts in the second half of 2009. The song was one of the choices to be the series' winner single, but Journey did not like the arrangement of The X Factor version. "The Climb" by Miley Cyrus was eventually chosen. McElderry still frequently performs the song in his live shows, occasionally changing the lyrics, "born and raised in South Detroit" to "born and raised in South Shields."

=== George Lamond version ===
"Don't Stop Believin'"

Single by George Lamond

from the album Don't Stop Believin'
- Released: 2008
- Genre: Dance-pop
- Length: 3:42 (radio edit); 6:00 (extended mix)
- Label: Robbins Entertainment
- Songwriters: George Lamond, Jonathan Cain, Steve Perry, Neal Schon
- Producer: Giuseppe D

In 2008, after a hiatus from recording, a producer-friend, Giuseppe D, presented George Lamond the idea to release a dance-pop cover of the song. Released on Robbins Entertainment, Lamond's cover reached No. 1 on New York's 103.5 KTU. The release also found success on other U.S. radio stations, especially in the Northeast and Canada. WKTU presented Lamond with a Lifetime Achievement Award in 2009.

=== Big Brother 2010 ===
The housemates of Big Brother 2010 recorded a version of the song, coached by Andrew Stone of Pineapple Dance Studios, in July 2010. Stone also choreographed and shot a video of the performance. According to Digital Spy, the video "almost out-Glees Glee" Steve and Rachel sang the lead vocals.

=== UNICEF benefit version ===
In 2020, Journey recorded a new version of the song to promote UNICEF's "Won't Stop" campaign, which was created to raise funds to buy personal protective equipment for medical frontline workers and provide for the needs of impoverished children. The performance aired on MSNBC and featured longtime members Arnel Pineda, Neal Schon, and Jonathan Cain, along with returning bass player Randy Jackson (who was previously Journey's session and touring bassist from 1986 to 1987), new keyboard player Jason Derlatka, and new drummer Narada Michael Walden.

== See also ==
- List of best-selling singles
- List of best-selling singles in the United States
- List of highest-certified singles in Australia
- List of highest-certified digital singles in the United States
