= Raised on Radio =

- Cover art by Michael Cotten and Prairie Prince

Studio album by Journey
- Released: April 21, 1986
- Recorded: October–December 1985
- Studios: Record Plant, Sausalito, California; Fantasy, Berkeley, California
- Genres: Arena rock; hard rock; soft rock
- Length: 44:39
- Label: Columbia
- Producer: Steve Perry

Journey studio album chronology
Frontiers (1983)	Raised on Radio (1986)	Trial by Fire (1996)

Singles from Raised on Radio
- 1. "Be Good to Yourself" Released: April 1986; 2. "Suzanne" Released: June 1986; 3. "Girl Can't Help It" Released: August 1986; 4. "I'll Be Alright Without You" Released: November 1986; 5. "Why Can't This Night Go on Forever" Released: April 1987

Professional ratings
Review scores
Source	Rating
AllMusic	3/5 stars

Raised on Radio is the ninth studio album by the American rock band Journey, released in April 1986 on the Columbia Records label. It is the first album not to feature founding bassist Ross Valory, who was replaced initially by session bassist Bob Glaub and then by Randy Jackson. Drummer Steve Smith contributed to a few tracks, but was replaced during the recording by session drummer Larrie Londin and then Mike Baird for the subsequent tour.

The album spawned three top 20 singles in the US: "Girl Can't Help It" (No. 17), "I'll Be Alright Without You" (No. 14), and "Suzanne" (No. 17). It also spawned a top ten single "Be Good to Yourself" (No. 9). It went to No. 4 on the Billboard 200 chart, and it was certified double platinum in the USA.

It would be the band's last record for a decade, until 1996's Trial by Fire.

== Background ==
Raised on Radio was released three years after Frontiers (1983). In 1984, both lead guitarist Neal Schon and lead singer Steve Perry released albums on their own; Schon in the band HSAS (Through the Fire), and Perry with his debut solo album, Street Talk. Perry considered leaving Journey following the release of Street Talk which he has referred to as "one of the most fun experiences I've had". Perry decided to return to working with Journey when he received a call from keyboardist Jonathan Cain, who wanted him to work on some unfinished songs.

Following Perry's return to Journey, he began to take more control over the band's direction. Bassist Ross Valory and drummer Steve Smith were fired from the band, against the wishes of manager Herbie Herbert. According to Perry, Valory and Smith "weren't pleased with the kind of music we were playing and weren't too keen on touring". Smith later said of the initial recording process: "There was a lot of pressure to do it the way Steve Perry wanted, which I had a lot of problems with because I felt it should be a group record, like all the other records." Valory was replaced by Randy Jackson (bass guitar) and Smith was replaced by session musician Larrie Londin (drums). In the VH-1 Behind the Music episode featuring the band, Perry expressed regret over his decision, stating if he could do it over, he'd have done things differently. Smith did record three tracks with Journey on the album, and he and Valory still received revenues from the record and subsequent tour. Both returned to Journey in 1995.

The band decided that Perry, who had proved his production capabilities on Street Talk, was the best fit to produce the album. According to Perry, this gave the rest of the band members as much creative control as possible: "Journey knows what it should sound like, so we all agreed I would be a good, safe, nondictator-type producer."

Perry changed the original title of this project from Freedom to Raised on Radio, which drew the ire of Herbert and some of the band members, as it varied from the one-word general theme in most of their previous albums. The band would end up using the Freedom title 36 years later for their fifteenth studio album.

The subsequent tour featured Schon, Perry, Cain, and Jackson, with drummer Mike Baird.

== Artwork ==
The cover of the album (by Prairie Prince, an early member of the band) was modeled after the studios and antennas for KNGS in Hanford, California, which was owned by Perry's parents, Ray and Mary Perry.

== Critical reception ==
Raised on Radio received mixed critical reception. William Ruhlmann of AllMusic stated that the album found the group "reduced to a trio," yet able to "recreate the accessible pop-rock sound perfected on earlier albums such as Escape and Frontiers." Ruhlmann noted that while it did not match the massive sales of Escape, it "confirmed that Journey's music had a large audience right to the (temporary) end of its career."

== Songs ==
Cash Box said of "Suzanne" that "Somewhat brooding verses give way to explosive choruses which feature Steve Perry's potent singing" and that "Journey has captured the essence of teen romance." Billboard said of it that Journey's "power rock style gets adapted just a bit here toward the techno-dance idiom."

Cash Box said of "Why Can't This Night Go On Forever" that it is a "rousing, emotional ballad is pure Journey" with a "bracing, high-wire vocal" from Steve Perry.

== Track listing ==
All lyrics are written by Steve Perry and Jonathan Cain; all music is composed by Steve Perry, Jonathan Cain, and Neal Schon, except where noted.

Side one
No.	Title	Music	Length
1.	"Girl Can't Help It"		3:51
2.	"Positive Touch"		4:17
3.	"Suzanne"	Perry; Cain	3:39
4.	"Be Good to Yourself"		3:52
5.	"Once You Love Somebody"		4:40
6.	"Happy to Give"	Perry; Cain	3:50

Side two
No.	Title	Music	Length
7.	"Raised on Radio"		3:49
8.	"I'll Be Alright Without You"		4:50
9.	"It Could Have Been You"		3:37
10.	"The Eyes of a Woman"		4:33
11.	"Why Can't This Night Go on Forever"	Perry; Cain	3:41
Total length:			44:39

2006 CD reissue bonus tracks
No.	Title	Length
12.	"Girl Can't Help It" (live)	4:18
13.	"I'll Be Alright Without You" (live)	5:02
Total length:		53:57

== Personnel ==
Credits for Raised on Radio adapted from liner notes.

Journey

- Steve Perry – lead vocals, backing vocals (all tracks except 11), producer
- Neal Schon – guitar, backing vocals (all tracks except 11), guitar synthesizer, Kurzweil synthesizer (track 10)
- Jonathan Cain – keyboards, backing vocals (all tracks except 11), DMX programming (track 3), additional vocal co-production
- Steve Smith – drums (tracks 2, 10, 11)

Additional musicians

- Randy Jackson – bass (all tracks except 2, 10, 11), backing vocals (track 2)
- Bob Glaub – bass (tracks 2, 10, 11)
- Larrie Londin – drums (all tracks except 2, 10, 11)
- Mike Baird – drums (tracks 12, 13) (2006 CD reissue only)
- Steve Minkins – percussion (track 3)
- Danny Hull – saxophone (tracks 2, 7), harp (track 7)

Production and design

- Randy Goodrum – additional vocal co-production
- Jim Gaines – associate producer, engineer
- Mark McKenna – engineer
- Steve Rinkoff – engineer
- Robert Missbach – assistant engineer
- Bob Clearmountain – mixing
- Bob Ludwig – mastering, remastering
- Brian Lee – remastering

== Charts ==
Chart (1986)	Peak position
Canada Top Albums/CDs (RPM)	39
Dutch Albums (Album Top 100)	49
Finnish Albums (The Official Finnish Charts)	29
German Albums (Offizielle Top 100)	53
Japanese Albums (Oricon)	3
Swedish Albums (Sverigetopplistan)	16
Swiss Albums (Schweizer Hitparade)	26
UK Albums (Official Charts)	22
US Billboard 200	4

== Certifications ==
Region	Certification	Certified units/sales
Canada (Music Canada)	Gold	50,000^{^}
United States (RIAA)	2× Platinum	2,000,000^{^}
^{^} Shipments figures based on certification alone.
