= Jonathan Cain =

American rock musician (born 1950)

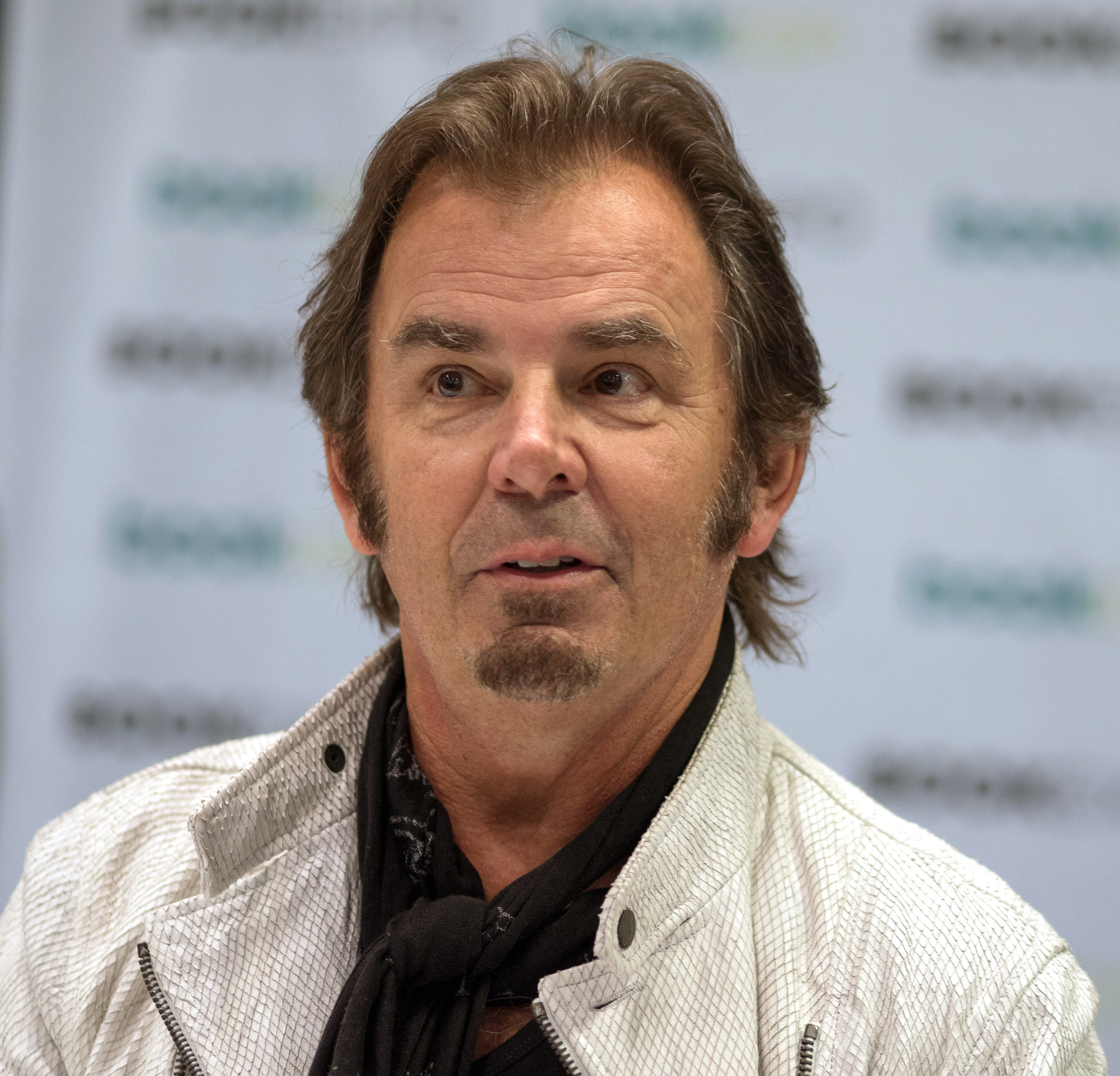
- Cain in 2018

Background information
- Born: Jonathan Leonard Friga; February 26, 1950 (age 76); Chicago, Illinois, U.S.
- Genres: Contemporary Christian music; hard rock; pop rock; progressive rock; smooth jazz
- Occupations: Musician; songwriter; producer
- Instruments: Keyboards; guitar; vocals
- Years active: 1965–present
- Member of: Journey
- Formerly of: The Babys; Bad English
- Personal details
- Spouses: Tané McClure (m. 1980; div. 1984); Elizabeth Yvette Fullerton (m. 1989; div. 2014); Paula White (m. 2015)
- Children: 3
- Website: jonathancain.org

Jonathan Leonard Friga (born February 26, 1950), known professionally as Jonathan Cain, is an American musician, best known as the keyboardist and rhythm guitarist for the rock band Journey. He has also worked with the Babys and Bad English. Cain was inducted into the Rock and Roll Hall of Fame as a member of Journey in 2017. He also maintains a solo career as a contemporary Christian artist.

== Early life and education ==
Cain was born in Chicago to Leonard and Nancy Friga. At the age of eight, he began accordion lessons, and by the time he was in his teens, he was playing accordion and piano at parties and in clubs. He also plays guitar, bass, and harmonica.

Cain is a survivor of the Our Lady of the Angels School fire of 1958, which took the lives of 92 students and three nuns.

In 1968, Cain graduated from East Leyden High School in Franklin Park, Illinois, a Chicago suburb, and later attended the Chicago Conservatory of Music.

== Career ==
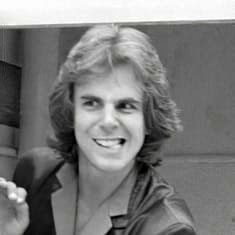
Cain in 1980

After releasing two 45s on Dial label as Johnny Lee from tapes recorded at Golden Voice in South Pekin, Illinois, he released a 45 under the name of Jonathan Cain on "October" on an obscure independent label. In 1976, Cain released another record as the Jonathan Cain Band, Windy City Breakdown, on Bearsville Records. In 1979, he joined the Babys, appearing on their albums Union Jacks and On the Edge.

In 1980, Cain left the Babys to join the rock band Journey, taking Gregg Rolie's place on keyboards. Cain aided Journey's rise to the top of the charts with his first collaborations on the album Escape, composing and playing the piano on songs such as "Don't Stop Believin'", described by AllMusic as "one of the best opening keyboard riffs in rock". Perhaps his most notable contribution was as sole author of the Journey ballad "Faithfully", a song about life on the road while in a band. Cain would go on to appear on at least 13 other Journey albums and compilations.

The song "Working Class Man" sung by Jimmy Barnes is one of Cain's compositions and is considered to be Barnes' signature song.

Cain reunited with former Babys bandmates John Waite and Ricky Phillips, fellow Journey bandmate Neal Schon, and future Journey drummer Deen Castronovo to form the band Bad English. The band released two albums before disbanding in the early 1990s. In 1996, the Journey lineup from the album Escape was briefly reunited.

Cain is known to perform a piano solo at every Journey concert, usually right before the band performs "Open Arms". He started this tradition when he first joined the band in 1980.

In addition to his work with Journey, Cain has released eight solo albums and contributed to solo albums by fellow Journey member Neal Schon. His solo work includes a move to making Christian music since 2016.

Cain serves as the worship leader at City of Destiny, where his wife Paula White is the pastor.

In May 2018, Cain became a published author with the release of his memoir, Don't Stop Believin': The Man, the Band, and the Song That Inspired Generations.

== Personal life ==
Cain has been married three times. His first wife was actress and singer Tané McClure, for whom he wrote the 1983 hit song "Faithfully".

In 1989, he married his second wife, Elizabeth Yvette Fullerton, with whom he has three children: Madison (1993) and twins Liza and Weston (1996). He and Elizabeth divorced at the end of 2014. Madison is married to Trev Lukather, Steve Lukather's son.

In April 2015, he married minister Paula White, making it the third marriage for both. They reside in Apopka, Florida.

Jonathan has two younger brothers, Thomas and Harold.

Cain and David Kalmusky designed and built Addiction Sound, a recording studio in Nashville, Tennessee.

Cain is a devout Christian and believes this is reflected in his work creating and sharing Christian music.

In November 2022, Cain performed "Don't Stop Believin'", which he co-wrote, at a party at Donald Trump's Mar-a-Lago estate. Journey bandmate Neal Schon's attorney sent Cain a letter accusing him of damaging the "Journey brand" by performing at a political event, and asking him to refrain from representing Journey at such events.

== Solo discography ==
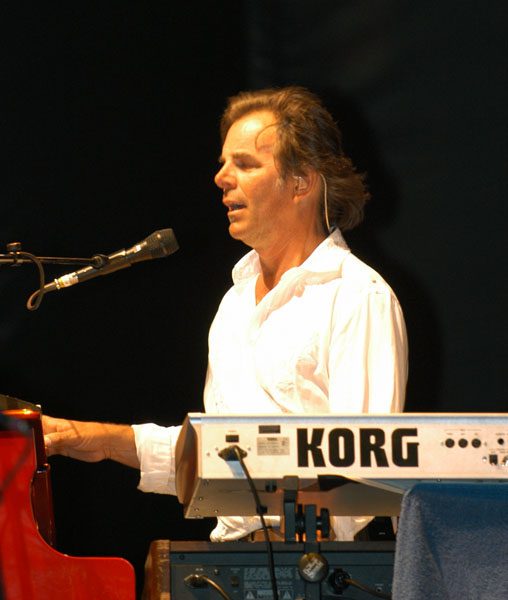
Cain performing in 2007

- "Til It's Time to Say Goodbye"/"Ladies' Night" (1975) October Records [OCT 1001-AS(BS)]
- Windy City Breakdown (1977) Bearsville/Wounded Bird Records
- Back to the Innocence (1995) Intersound Records
- Piano with a View (1995) Higher Octave Records
- Body Language (1997) Higher Octave Records
- For a Lifetime (1998) Higher Octave Records
- Namaste (2001) Wildhorse Records
- Anthology (2001) One Way Records
- Animated Movie Love Songs (2002) One Way Records
- Bare Bones (2004) AAO Records
- Where I Live (2006) AAO Records
- What God Wants to Hear (2016) Identity Records
- Unsung Noel (2017)
- The Songs You Leave Behind (2018)
- More Like Jesus (2019)
- Piano Worship (2020)
- Freedom in Your Grace (2020)
- Arise (2022)
- Christmas Is Love (2022)
- "No One Else – A Tribute to Charlie Kirk" (2025)

== Awards ==
Cain has received two BMI songwriter awards, both for songs co-written with Steve Perry, "Open Arms" and "Who's Crying Now". The Journey song "When You Love a Woman", which he co-wrote with Perry and Schon, was nominated for a Grammy Award in 1997.

== See also ==
- List of celebrities who own wineries and vineyards

Preceded by Stevie Roseman	Journey keyboardist 1980 – present	Succeeded by incumbent
