= List of Journey band members =

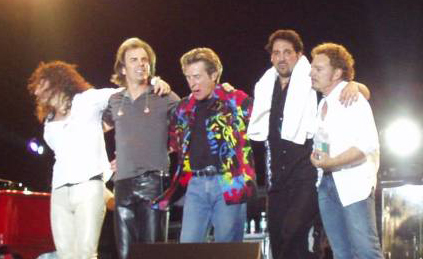
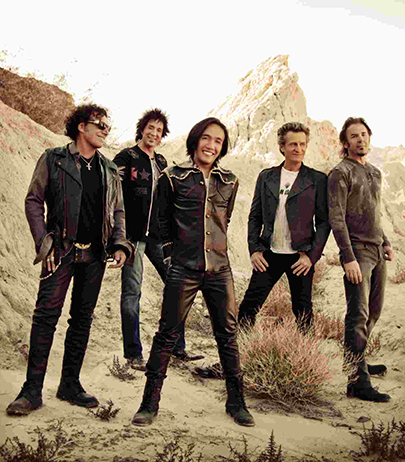
Two lineups of Journey in 2002 (top) and 2013 (bottom).

Journey is an American rock band from San Francisco, California. Formed in February 1973 as the Golden Gate Rhythm Section, the group was renamed Journey in the summer and originally included keyboardist and vocalist Gregg Rolie, lead guitarist Neal Schon, rhythm guitarist George Tickner, bassist Ross Valory and drummer Prairie Prince. The band's lineup as of 2021 features Schon, alongside keyboardist and rhythm guitarist Jonathan Cain (since 1980), drummer and vocalist Deen Castronovo (from 1998–2015 and since 2021), vocalist Arnel Pineda (since 2007), keyboardist and vocalist Jason Derlatka (since 2019), and bassist Todd Jensen (since 2021).

== History ==
=== 1973–1987 ===
Journey was formed in February 1973 by lead guitarist Neal Schon with bassist Ross Valory, rhythm guitarist George Tickner and drummer Prairie Prince, who were joined by keyboardist and vocalist Gregg Rolie in the summer before debuting live on New Year's Eve 1973. Early the next year, Prince left to rejoin his previous group the Tubes, with former John Mayall & the Bluesbreakers and Frank Zappa drummer Aynsley Dunbar taking his place on February 1, 1974. Shortly after the release of the band's self-titled debut album in 1975, Tickner left Journey to pursue a career in medicine. The guitarist was not replaced and the band remained a four-piece for its next two albums, Look into the Future and Next.

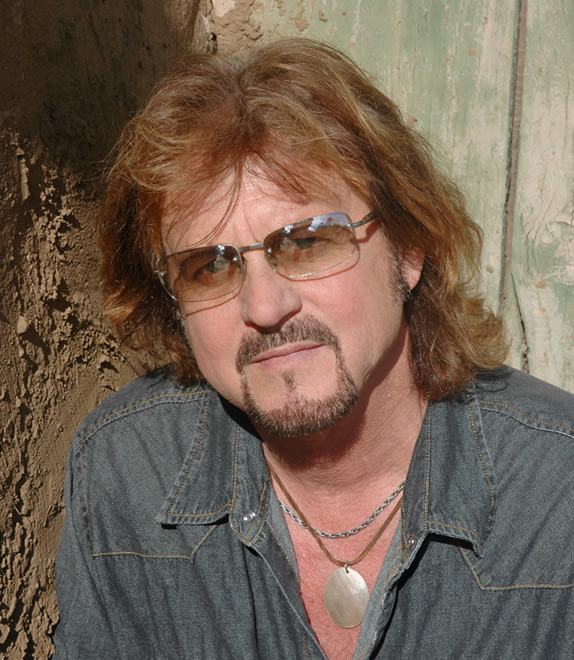
Gregg Rolie, the band's first keyboardist, performed as lead vocalist on the band's first three albums before Robert Fleischman and later Steve Perry joined.

In March 1977, Journey added Robert Fleischman as its first non-instrumental lead vocalist. After just seven months, however, Fleischman was replaced by Steve Perry in October, at the end of a tour supporting Emerson, Lake & Palmer. The band issued Perry's debut album Infinity the following year, before Dunbar was dismissed in October 1978. He was replaced by Steve Smith, previously of Ronnie Montrose's band, who opened for Journey on the Infinity tour. The group's new lineup remained stable for two years and three studio albums: Evolution, Departure and the soundtrack Dream, After Dream. By the end of 1980, however, founding keyboardist Rolie had decided to leave the band, with Jonathan Cain of The Babys chosen as his replacement. Cain also served as Journey's first rhythm guitarist since Tickner's departure in 1975.

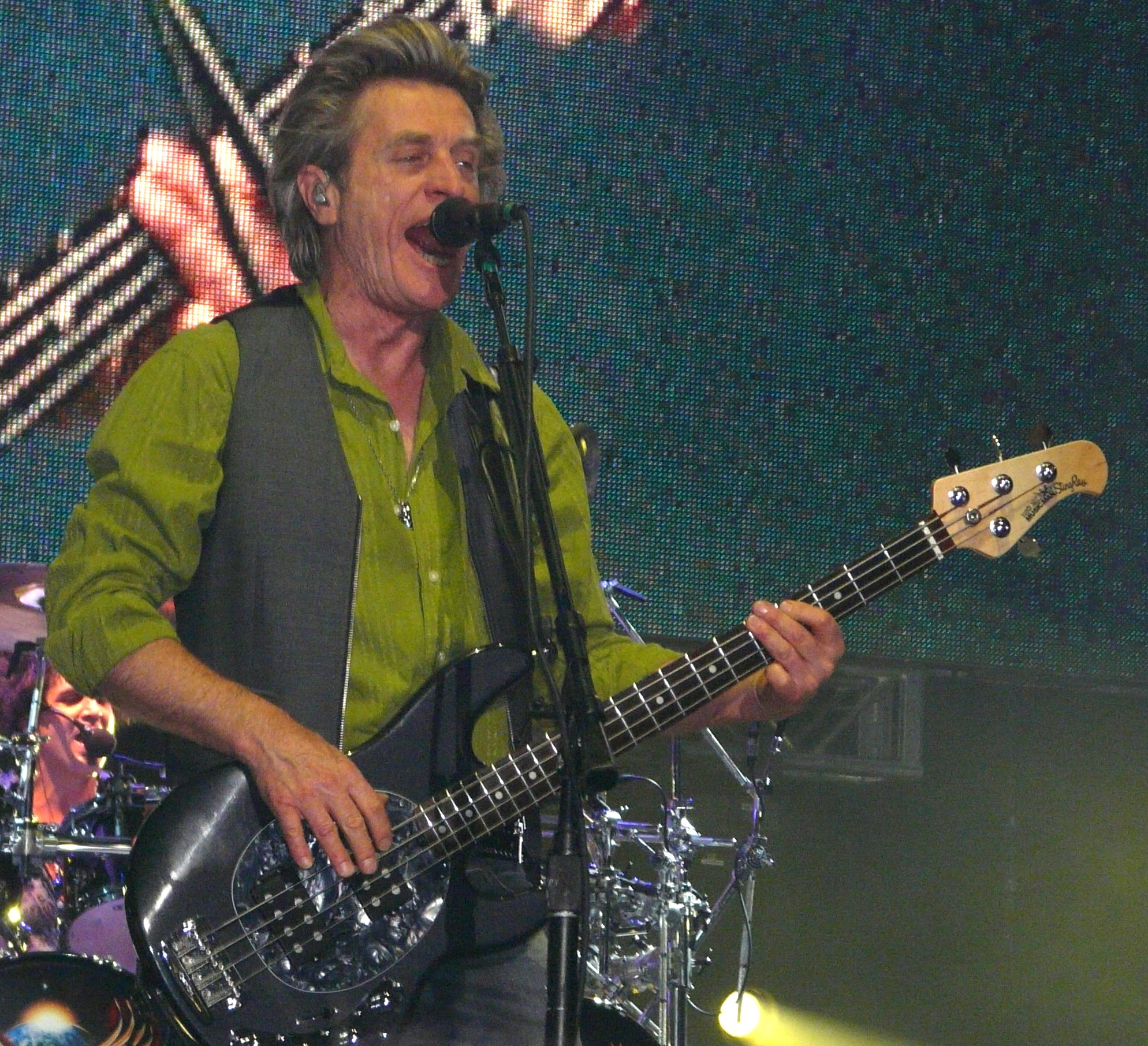
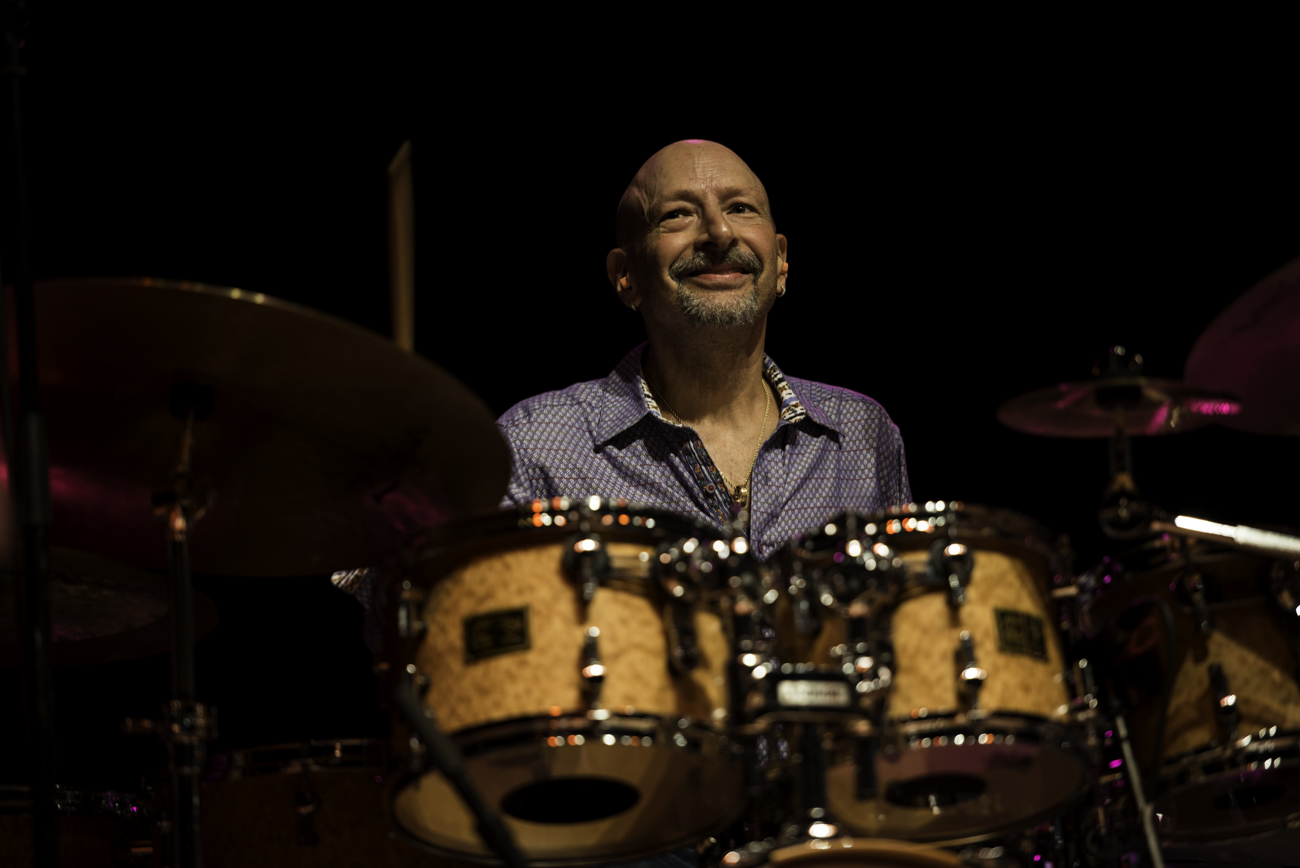
Bassist Ross Valory and drummer Steve Smith both left Journey in 1985, returned in 1995, and were then dismissed again in 2020.

During early production for the band's ninth studio album Raised on Radio in late 1985, both Valory and Smith left Journey – the former during the second week of recording and Smith after a couple of months. Perry initially claimed that the pair left of their own accord, however they later responded in an interview that the frontman had forced them out. In later reports, Smith recalled that the band's changing approach to writing and recording had alienated him and Valory, which led to their departures. Smith performed drums on three tracks with session bassist Bob Glaub, before the two were replaced for the rest of the album by Larrie Londin and Randy Jackson, respectively. For the subsequent touring cycle, Jackson remained on bass and Mike Baird took over on drums, the latter taking over from Atma Anur.

Partway through the Raised on Radio Tour in February 1987, Perry left Journey. The singer cited worsening relations with Schon, as well as the illness and eventual death of his mother during the album's recording, as reasons for his departure. Journey then went on hiatus and Schon and Cain went on to form Bad English.

=== Since 1991 ===
On November 3, 1991, Steve Perry, Neal Schon and Jonathan Cain reunited for a one-off performance at a benefit concert for promoter Bill Graham, who had died a week earlier. Four years later, the "classic" lineup of Journey – including Perry, Schon and Cain, plus bassist Ross Valory and drummer Steve Smith – reformed, beginning rehearsals in October 1995 before starting recording for a new album early the next year. After the release of the album, Trial by Fire, Journey planned to tour before Perry suffered an injury in a hiking accident; he refused to undergo surgery, which ultimately led to his dismissal from the group.

Perry's departure was officially announced in May 1998. He was replaced immediately by Steve Augeri, formerly of Tall Stories. At the same time, Smith was also replaced by Deen Castronovo, with whom Schon and Cain had previously performed in Bad English. With the new members, Journey issued Arrival in 2001 and Generations in 2005. Shortly after the start of a tour supporting Def Leppard in June 2006, Augeri was forced to leave temporarily due to an "acute throat condition", with Talisman and former Yngwie Malmsteen vocalist Jeff Scott Soto taking his place. In December, the replacement was made permanent.

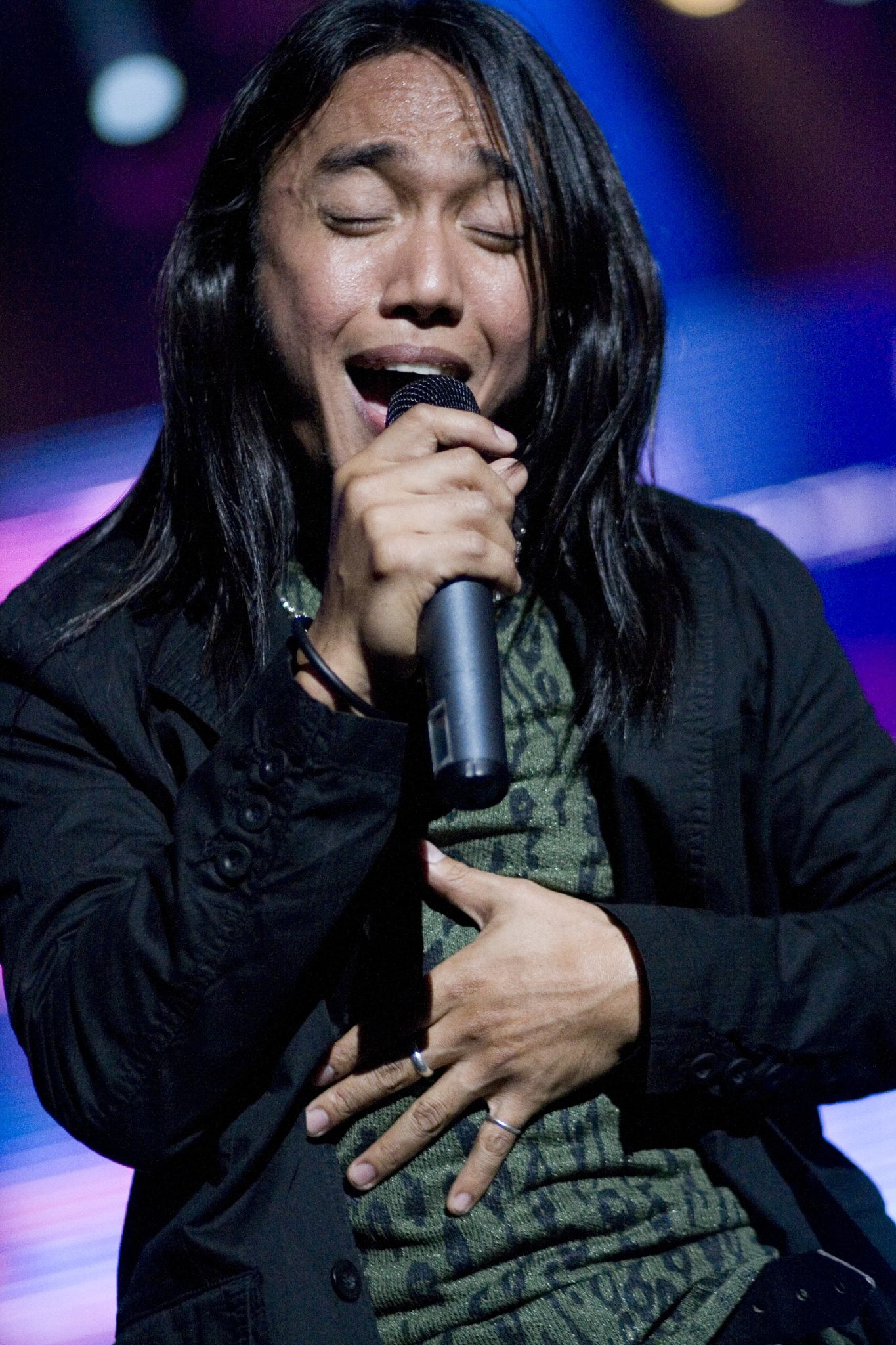
Vocalist Arnel Pineda replaced Jeff Scott Soto in 2007 and has remained with the band ever since.

Within six months of his permanent appointment, Soto had left Journey as the group went on a brief hiatus. Speaking about the singer's sudden departure, Cain commented that the band "just wanted to move in a different direction sonically". Before the end of the year, the group announced Filipino vocalist Arnel Pineda as its new frontman, who was selected after band members saw videos of him singing just like Perry. Revelation and Eclipse followed in 2008 and 2011. On June 14, 2015, Castronovo was arrested for assault following a domestic dispute. He was later charged with rape, sexual abuse, coercion and unlawful use of a weapon. On August 10, Castronovo was officially fired from Journey. Schon initially contacted former bandmate Smith to take his place, but as he was unavailable it was taken by Omar Hakim.

In November 2015, with his touring commitments fulfilled, Smith rejoined Journey for a third tenure. On March 3, 2020, Schon and Cain filed a lawsuit accusing Smith and bassist Valory of attempting a "corporate coup d'état" to take control of the band's business entity Nightmare Productions, and declared that the two were fired; Smith and Valory have filed a countersuit. Two months later, the group announced the return of former bassist Randy Jackson and one-time drummer Narada Michael Walden, as well as second keyboardist Jason Derlatka.

In July 2021, Schon confirmed that Deen Castronovo, who was previously in the band, had rejoined as a second drummer. Meanwhile, Jackson's back surgery led to the band bringing in Marco Mendoza to play bass, with Mendoza having previously played with Schon and Castronovo in Neal Schon's Journey Through Time. Mendoza's stint with Journey, though, only lasted a few months due to Schon's feeling that his bass playing did not gel with the band's sound, and he was replaced by Todd Jensen, who had previously played with Schon and Castronovo in Hardline.

On March 1, 2022, Cain confirmed that neither Walden nor Jackson remained in the lineup, with Walden's exit following a minor heart attack following a live show in Pennsylvania. Nevertheless, both were still featured on Freedom, as they had completed their parts on the album before their departures. Schon later stated that Walden and Jackson were still "musical members" of the band, and he would certainly write again with Walden in the future. Schon also did not rule out the possibility of former members Steve Perry and Gregg Rolie returning for a reunion on the band's 50th anniversary. Although Schon had confirmed that former member Rolie would appear with the band for their tour in January 2023, he later backtracked that same month, stating that Rolie would not be joining for the 50th anniversary tour, although Rolie would later make a guest appearance for the band's performance in Austin on February 22, 2023.

== Members ==
=== Current ===
Image	Name	Years active	Instruments	Release contributions
	Neal Schon	1973–1987; 1991; 1995–present	lead guitar; backing vocals; lead vocals (1976, 2005)	all Journey releases
	Jonathan Cain	1980–1987; 1991; 1995–present	keyboards; rhythm guitar; backing vocals; lead vocals (2005)	all Journey releases from Escape (1981) onwards
	Deen Castronovo	1998–2015; 2021–present (not touring 2026–present)	drums; backing vocals; occasional lead vocals (2005–present)	all Journey releases from Arrival (2000) onwards, except Greatest Hits 1978–1997 (2003), Live in Houston 1981: The Escape Tour (2005) and Escape & Frontiers Live in Japan (2019)
	Arnel Pineda	2007–present	lead vocals	all Journey releases from Revelation (2008) onwards
	Jason Derlatka	2019–present	keyboards; backing and lead vocals	Freedom (2022); Live in Concert at Lollapalooza (2022)
	Todd Jensen	2021–present	bass guitar; backing vocals	none

=== Former ===
Image	Name	Years active	Instruments	Release contributions
	Ross Valory	1973–1985; 1995–2020	bass guitar; keyboards (1974, 1978); backing vocals; lead vocals (2005)	all Journey releases from Journey (1975) to Escape & Frontiers Live in Japan (2019) except Raised on Radio (1986)
	Gregg Rolie	1973–1980	keyboards; lead vocals; backing vocals (1977–1980)	all Journey releases from Journey (1975) to Captured (1981); Time^{3} (1992); Greatest Hits 1978–1997 (2003)
	George Tickner	1973–1975 (died 2023)	rhythm guitar; backing vocals	Journey (1975); Time^{3} (1992)
	Charles "Prairie" Prince	1973–1974	drums; percussion	none – live performances only
	Aynsley Dunbar	1974–1978	drums; percussion	all Journey releases from Journey (1975) to Infinity (1978); Time^{3} (1992); Greatest Hits 1978–1997 (2003)
	Robert Fleischman	1977	lead vocals	Time^{3} (1992) – «For You» only
	Steve Perry	1977–1987; 1991; 1995–1998	lead vocals	all Journey releases from Infinity (1978) to Greatest Hits Live (1998); Greatest Hits 1978–1997 (2003); Live in Houston 1981: The Escape Tour (2005)
	Steve Smith	1978–1985; 1995–1998; 2015–2020	drums; percussion; occasional backing vocals	all Journey releases from Evolution (1979) to Greatest Hits Live (1998); Greatest Hits 1978–1997 (2003); Live in Houston 1981: The Escape Tour (2005); Escape & Frontiers Live in Japan (2019)
	Randy Jackson	1985–1987; 2020–2021	bass guitar; backing vocals	Raised on Radio (1986); Time^{3} (1992); Greatest Hits 1978–1997 (2003); Freedom (2022)
	Narada M. Walden	1987 (one off); 2020–2022	drums; backing vocals	Freedom (2022), Live in Concert at Lollapalooza (2022)
	Steve Augeri	1998–2006	lead vocals; occasional rhythm guitar	Arrival (2000); Journey 2001 (2001); Red 13 (2002); Generations (2005)
	Jeff Scott Soto	2006–2007	lead vocals; occasional rhythm guitar	none – live performances only

=== Backup ===
Image	Name	Years active	Instruments	Details
	Bob Glaub	1985 (session)	bass guitar	After the departure of Ross Valory, Glaub performed bass on three tracks for 1986's Raised on Radio.
	Larrie Londin (real name Ralph Gallant)	1985 (session) (died 1992)	drums	After Steve Smith recorded three tracks for the album, Londin took over for the rest of Raised on Radio.
	Atma Anur	1986 (touring)	drums	Anur was brought in as the drummer for the Raised on Radio Tour, but left after a run of rehearsals.
	Mike Baird	1986–1987 (touring)	drums	Baird took over on drums following Anur's departure, performing on the entirety of the 1986–87 touring cycle.
	Omar Hakim	2015 (touring)	drums	Hakim took over from Deen Castronovo after he was arrested in 2015, before Smith returned to replace him.
	Travis Thibodaux	2016–2019 (touring)	keyboards; backing and lead vocals	Thibodaux performed as part of Journey's touring lineup from 2016 to 2019, contributing keyboards and vocals.
	Marco Mendoza	2021 (touring)	bass guitar; backing vocals	Filled in for several dates while Randy Jackson recovered from back surgery. Appeared on the live album Live in Concert at Lollapalooza.
	Steve Toomey	2021; 2024 (both touring)	drums	Deen Castronovo's drum tech filled in for the drummer in 2021 and 2024.
	Steve Murphy	2026–present	drums	Murphy will take over from Castronovo who is focusing on "personal health matters".

== Lineups ==
Period	Members	Releases
February – summer 1973	Neal Schon – lead guitar; George Tickner – rhythm guitar; Ross Valory – bass guitar; Prairie Prince – drums	none – rehearsals only
Summer 1973 – January 1974	Neal Schon – lead guitar, backing vocals; George Tickner – rhythm guitar, backing vocals; Gregg Rolie – keyboards, lead vocals; Ross Valory – bass guitar, backing vocals; Prairie Prince – drums	none – live performances only
February 1974 – May 1975	Neal Schon – lead guitar, backing vocals; George Tickner – rhythm guitar, backing vocals; Gregg Rolie – keyboards, lead vocals; Ross Valory – bass guitar, backing vocals, piano (1974); Aynsley Dunbar – drums	Journey (1975); In the Beginning (1979); Time^{3} (1992)
May 1975 – March 1977	Neal Schon – guitar, backing vocals, lead vocals (1976); Gregg Rolie – keyboards, lead vocals; Ross Valory – bass guitar, backing vocals; Aynsley Dunbar – drums	Look into the Future (1976); Next (1977); In the Beginning (1979); Time^{3} (1992)
March – October 1977	Robert Fleischman – lead and backing vocals; Neal Schon – guitar, backing vocals; Gregg Rolie – keyboards, backing and lead vocals; Ross Valory – bass guitar, backing vocals; Aynsley Dunbar – drums	Time^{3} (1992)
October 1977 – October 1978	Steve Perry – lead and backing vocals; Neal Schon – guitar, backing vocals; Gregg Rolie – keyboards, backing and lead vocals; Ross Valory – bass guitar, backing vocals; Aynsley Dunbar – drums	Infinity (1978); Greatest Hits (1988); The Ballade (1991); Time^{3} (1992); The Essential Journey (2001)
October 1978 – December 1980	Steve Perry – lead vocals; Neal Schon – guitar, backing vocals; Gregg Rolie – keyboards, backing and lead vocals; Ross Valory – bass guitar, backing vocals; Steve Smith – drums	Evolution (1979); Departure (1980); Dream, After Dream (1980); Captured (1981); Greatest Hits (1988); The Ballade (1991); Time^{3} (1992); The Essential Journey (2001)
December 1980 – October 1985	Steve Perry – lead vocals; Neal Schon – lead guitar, backing vocals; Jonathan Cain – keyboards, rhythm guitar, backing vocals; Ross Valory – bass guitar, backing vocals; Steve Smith – drums	Escape (1981); Frontiers (1983); Greatest Hits (1988); The Ballade (1991); Time^{3} (1992); Greatest Hits Live (1998); The Essential Journey (2001); Live in Houston 1981: The Escape Tour (2005)
October – November 1985	Steve Perry – lead vocals; Neal Schon – lead guitar, backing vocals; Jonathan Cain – keyboards, rhythm guitar, backing vocals; Steve Smith – drums; with: Bob Glaub – bass guitar (session)	Raised on Radio (1986); The Ballade (1991); Time^{3} (1992); The Essential Journey (2001)
November 1985 – February 1987	Steve Perry – lead vocals; Neal Schon – lead guitar, backing vocals; Jonathan Cain – keyboards, rhythm guitar, backing vocals; Randy Jackson – bass guitar, backing vocals; with: Larrie Londin – drums (session); Atma Anur – drums (tour rehearsals); Mike Baird – drums (touring)	Raised on Radio (1986); Greatest Hits (1988); The Ballade (1991); Time^{3} (1992); The Essential Journey (2001)
March 1987 – September 1995 Hiatus with one-off show on November 3, 1991	Steve Perry – lead vocals; Neal Schon – guitar, backing vocals; Jonathan Cain – keyboards, backing vocals	none – one show
October 1995 – May 1998	Steve Perry – lead vocals; Neal Schon – lead guitar, backing vocals; Jonathan Cain – keyboards, rhythm guitar, backing vocals; Ross Valory – bass guitar, backing vocals; Steve Smith – drums	Trial by Fire (1996); The Essential Journey (2001)
May 1998 – July 2006	Steve Augeri – lead vocals; Neal Schon – lead guitar, backing vocals; Jonathan Cain – keyboards, rhythm guitar, backing vocals; Ross Valory – bass guitar, backing vocals; Deen Castronovo – drums, backing vocals	Arrival (2000); Journey 2001 (2001); Red 13 (2002); Generations (2005)
July 2006 – June 2007	Jeff Scott Soto – lead and backing vocals; Neal Schon – lead guitar, backing vocals; Jonathan Cain – keyboards, rhythm guitar, backing vocals; Ross Valory – bass guitar, backing vocals; Deen Castronovo – drums, backing and lead vocals	none – live performances only
December 2007 – June 2015	Arnel Pineda – lead and backing vocals; Neal Schon – lead guitar, backing vocals; Jonathan Cain – keyboards, rhythm guitar, backing vocals; Ross Valory – bass guitar, backing vocals; Deen Castronovo – drums, backing and lead vocals	Revelation (2008); Live in Manila (2009); Eclipse (2011)
June – August 2015	Arnel Pineda – lead vocals; Neal Schon – lead guitar, backing vocals; Jonathan Cain – keyboards, rhythm guitar, backing vocals; Ross Valory – bass guitar, backing vocals; with: Omar Hakim – drums (touring)	none – live performances only
November 2015 – March 2020	Arnel Pineda – lead and backing vocals; Neal Schon – lead guitar, backing vocals; Jonathan Cain – keyboards, rhythm guitar, backing vocals; Ross Valory – bass guitar, backing vocals; Steve Smith – drums; with: Travis Thibodaux – keyboards, backing and lead vocals (touring)	Escape & Frontiers Live in Japan (2019)
May 2020 – July 2021	Arnel Pineda – lead and backing vocals; Neal Schon – lead guitar, backing vocals; Jonathan Cain – keyboards, rhythm guitar, backing vocals; Jason Derlatka – keyboards, backing and lead vocals; Randy Jackson – bass guitar, backing vocals; Narada M. Walden – drums, backing vocals	Freedom (2022)
July – December 2021	Arnel Pineda – lead and backing vocals; Neal Schon – lead guitar, backing vocals; Jonathan Cain – keyboards, rhythm guitar, backing vocals; Jason Derlatka – keyboards, backing and lead vocals; Narada M. Walden – drums; Deen Castronovo – drums, backing and lead vocals; with: Marco Mendoza – bass guitar, backing vocals (touring)	Live in Concert at Lollapalooza (2022)
December 2021 – present	Arnel Pineda – lead vocals; Neal Schon – lead guitar, backing vocals; Jonathan Cain – keyboards, rhythm guitar, backing vocals; Jason Derlatka – keyboards, backing and lead vocals; Todd Jensen – bass guitar, backing vocals; Deen Castronovo – drums, backing and lead vocals	none to date – live performances only
