= Greatest Hits Live (Journey album) =

Live album by Journey
- Released: 24 March 1998
- Recorded: The Summit, Houston, Texas on November 6, 1981, The Budokan, Tokyo, Japan on March 2, 1983, Lloyd Noble Center, Norman, Oklahoma on July 19, 1983
- Genre: Arena rock
- Length: 71:16
- Label: Columbia/Sony
- Producer: Kevin Shirley

Journey chronology
Trial by Fire (1996)	Greatest Hits Live (1998)	Arrival (2001)

Professional ratings
Review scores
Source	Rating
Allmusic	3/5 stars

Greatest Hits Live is a live album released by the American rock band Journey in 1998, recorded in 1981 and 1983. It contains songs from the studio albums Infinity (1978) through Frontiers (1983). The album peaked at No. 79 on the US Billboard 200 chart. The songs recorded in 1981 would later be released on Live in Houston 1981: The Escape Tour, featuring the full concert, in 2005. The full concert from 1983 remains unreleased as of 2023.

== Track listing ==
No.	Title	Writer(s)	Length
1.	"Don't Stop Believin'"	Steve Perry, Jonathan Cain, Neal Schon	4:10
2.	"Separate Ways (Worlds Apart)"	Perry, Cain	5:19
3.	"After the Fall"	Perry, Cain	5:14
4.	"Lovin', Touchin', Squeezin'"	Perry	7:10
5.	"Faithfully"	Cain	4:18
6.	"Who's Crying Now"	Perry, Cain	5:36
7.	"Any Way You Want It"	Perry, Schon	3:29
8.	"Lights"	Perry, Schon	3:13
9.	"Stay Awhile"	Perry, Schon	2:26
10.	"Open Arms"	Perry, Cain	3:14
11.	"Send Her My Love"	Perry, Cain	3:37
12.	"Still They Ride"	Perry, Cain, Schon	4:05
13.	"Stone in Love"	Perry, Cain, Schon	4:38
14.	"Escape"	Perry, Cain, Schon	5:25
15.	"Line of Fire"	Perry, Schon	3:08
16.	"Wheel in the Sky"	Robert Fleischman, Schon, Diane Valory	5:34
17.	"Fireworks & Crowd"		0:40

== Personnel ==
Band members

- Steve Perry – lead vocals, keyboards, piano
- Neal Schon – lead guitar, vocals
- Jonathan Cain – keyboards, piano, rhythm guitar, vocals
- Ross Valory – bass, vocals
- Steve Smith – drums, percussion

Production

- Kevin Shirley – producer, mixing
- Guy Charbonneau, Biff Dawes, Kevin Elson – engineers
- Greg Gasperino – mixing assistant
- George Marino – mastering
- John Kalodner – A&R executive

== Charts ==
Chart (1998)	Peak position
Japanese Albums (Oricon)	40
US Billboard 200	79

== Certifications ==
Region	Certification	Certified units/sales
United States (RIAA)	Platinum	1,000,000^{‡}
^{‡} Sales+streaming figures based on certification alone.
