= Greatest Hits 1978–1997 =

2003 Journey music-video DVD

Video by Journey
- Released: November 25, 2003
- Genres: Hard rock, arena rock
- Length: 73:38
- Label: Columbia/Sony
- Producers: Steve Perry, John Kalodner, Michael Rubenstein

Journey chronology
Journey 2001 (2001)	Greatest Hits 1978–1997 (2003)	Live in Houston 1981: The Escape Tour (2005)

Professional ratings
Review scores
Source	Rating
AllMusic	4.5/5 stars

Greatest Hits DVD 1978–1997 – Music Videos and Live Performances is the second DVD by the American rock band Journey, released in 2003. It contains music videos and live performances of songs from the band's history with longtime lead vocalist Steve Perry, who left the band in 1998. It is Journey's best selling concert video going 4× Multi-Platinum since its 2003 release.

== Track listing ==
1. "Don't Stop Believin'" (1981 – Live, Escape Tour, Houston, TX)
2. "Wheel in the Sky" (1978 – Music video)
3. "Faithfully" (1983 – Music video)
4. "Any Way You Want It" (1981 – Live, Escape Tour, Houston, TX (P.A. Board Mix))
5. "Separate Ways (Worlds Apart)" (1983 – Music video)
6. "Lights" (1978 – Music video)
7. "Lovin', Touchin', Squeezin'" (1979 – Music video)
8. "Be Good to Yourself" (1986 – Live, Raised on Radio Tour, Mountain Aire Festival, Angels Camp, CA)
9. "When You Love a Woman" (1996 – Music video)
10. "Who's Crying Now" (1981 – Live, Escape Tour, Houston, TX (P.A. Board Mix))
11. "Send Her My Love" (1983 – Music video)
12. "Girl Can't Help It" (1986 – Live, Raised on Radio Tour, Mountain Aire Festival, Angels Camp, CA)
13. "Open Arms" (1981 – Live, Escape Tour, Houston, TX (P.A. Board Mix))
14. "Just the Same Way" (1979 – Music video)
15. "Stone in Love" (1981 – Live, Escape Tour, Houston, TX)
16. "Feeling That Way" (1978 – Music Video)
17. "After the Fall" (1983 – Music video)
18. "I'll Be Alright Without You" (1986 – Live, Raised on Radio Tour, Atlanta, GA)

== Personnel ==
- Steve Perry – lead vocals
- Neal Schon – guitar, vocals
- Jonathan Cain – keyboards, vocals
- Ross Valory – bass, vocals
- Steve Smith – drums
- Gregg Rolie – keyboards, vocals
- Aynsley Dunbar – drums
- Randy Jackson – bass, vocals
- Michael Baird – drums
