= Journey 2001 =

- Cover art by Chris Moore

Video by Journey
- Released: December 18, 2001
- Recorded: Las Vegas, Nevada; December 2000
- Genre: Hard rock, arena rock
- Length: 106:17
- Label: Columbia/Sony Music Entertainment
- Director: Dave Neugebauer, Kate Ferris, Josh Adams
- Producer: Bob Brigham, Pat Morrow and Paul Becher for Nocturne Productions, Kevin Shirley

Journey chronology
| Journey 2001 (2001) | Greatest Hits 1978–1997 (2003) |

Professional ratings
Review scores
| Source | Rating |
|---|---|
| Allmusic | 2/5 stars |

Journey 2001 is the first live DVD by the American rock band Journey, released in 2001. It is also the only live DVD to feature Steve Augeri on lead vocals, who replaced longtime singer Steve Perry in 1998 with the song "Remember Me" on the Armageddon soundtrack. It features footage of a concert recorded in December 2000, in Las Vegas, Nevada. The setlist was primarily old songs from the band's history, as well as two new songs from the then-upcoming album Arrival, which was released later in 2001. Kevin Shirley produced and mixed the audio tracks.

== Track listing ==
1. "Program Start"
2. "Intro"
3. "Separate Ways (Worlds Apart)"
4. "Ask the Lonely"
5. "Guitar Solo"
6. "Stone in Love"
7. "Higher Place"
8. "Send Her My Love"
9. "Lights"
10. "Who's Crying Now"
11. "Piano Solo"
12. "Open Arms"
13. "Fillmore Boogie"
14. "All the Way"
15. "Escape"
16. "La Raza Del Sol (Intro)"
17. "La Raza Del Sol"
18. "Wheel in the Sky"
19. "Be Good to Yourself"
20. "Any Way You Want It"
21. "Don't Stop Believin'"
22. "Lovin', Touchin', Squeezin'"
23. "Faithfully"
24. "Credits"
