= Live in Houston 1981: The Escape Tour =

Live album by Journey

Video by Journey
- Released: 15 November 2005
- Recorded: 6 November 1981
- Venues: The Summit (Houston, Texas)
- Genres: Hard rock, soft rock, arena rock, pop rock, AOR, rock
- Length: 76:58 (incl. credits)
- Label: Columbia/Legacy
- Producers: Steve Perry, Michael Rubenstein, John Kalodner

Journey chronology
Greatest Hits 1978–1997 (2003)	Live in Houston 1981: The Escape Tour (2005)	Live in Manila (2009)

Live in Houston 1981: The Escape Tour

Live album by Journey
- Released: 16 May 2006
- Recorded: 6 November 1981
- Venue: The Summit (Houston, Texas)
- Genres: Hard rock, soft rock, arena rock, pop rock, AOR, rock
- Length: 77:10
- Label: Columbia/Legacy
- Producers: Steve Perry, John Kalodner

Journey chronology
Generations (2005)	Live in Houston 1981: The Escape Tour (2006)	Revelation (2008)

Professional ratings
Review scores
Source	Rating
Allmusic	4/5 stars

Live in Houston 1981: The Escape Tour is a live DVD/CD package by the American rock band Journey, released on November 15th, 2005. The content of the package was also released on May 16th, 2006 as a separate CD and separate DVD on the Columbia Records label. It was released on 180-gram vinyl in 2022, in both black and colored versions.

The material of the show was recorded and filmed for the then-fledgling MTV network on Journey's Escape Tour on November 6th, 1981 at The Summit in Houston, Texas, at the height of the band's commercial success.

Hits such as "Lights", "Lovin', Touchin', Squeezin'", "Wheel in the Sky", and "Any Way You Want It" are performed, along with tracks from Journey's then-current album Escape, like its title cut, "Open Arms", "Who's Crying Now" and "Don't Stop Believin'" .

Closing the CD, digital streaming purchases and vinyl versions of the concert is the track, "The Party's Over (Hopelessly in Love)" which was not on the DVD. Instead the DVD has bonus interviews with the band from 1981 and 1982 plus an album advertisement for Escape.

Footage from this DVD is used in the infomercial for the Time-Life Ultimate Rock Ballads CD set.

== Track listing ==
No.	Title	Length
1.	"Escape" (Includes unlisted "Intro to Escape" that the band would start shows with)	5:35
2.	"Line of Fire"	3:13
3.	"Lights"	2:58
4.	"Stay Awhile"	3:00
5.	"Open Arms"	3:15
6.	"Mother, Father"	5:20
7.	"Jonathan Cain Piano Solo (Instrumental)"	1:54
8.	"Who's Crying Now"	5:39
9.	"Where Were You"	4:19
10.	"Steve Smith drum solo (Instrumental)"	3:51
11.	"Dead or Alive"	4:01
12.	"Don't Stop Believin'"	4:07
13.	"Stone in Love"	5:14
14.	"Keep on Runnin'"	4:01
15.	"Neal Schon Guitar Solo (Instrumental)"	1:59
16.	"Wheel in the Sky"	6:05
17.	"Lovin', Touchin', Squeezin'"	4:38
18.	"Any Way You Want It"	3:46
19.	"The Party's Over (Hopelessly in Love)" (Bonus track on CD, digital streaming purchases and vinyl)	4:06
Total length:		77:10

== Personnel ==
Band members

- Steve Perry – lead vocals, keyboards, piano (uncredited)
- Neal Schon - lead guitar, background vocals
- Jonathan Cain – keyboards, piano, background vocals, rhythm guitar (uncredited)
- Ross Valory – bass guitar, background vocals
- Steve Smith – drums, percussion

Production

- Steve Perry — Producer [DVD and CD]
- Michael Rubenstein — film producer
- John Neal — film editor
- Kevin Elson – live recording, engineer
- Scott Gutierrez – engineer
- Allen Sides – mixing
- Bob Ludwig – mastering
- John Kalodner – executive producer
