= Escape & Frontiers Live in Japan =

Live in Japan 2017: Escape + Frontiers

Live album by Journey
- Released: March 29, 2019
- Recorded: February 7, 2017
- Venue: Nippon Budokan (Tokyo, Japan)
- Genre: Rock
- Length: 128:37
- Label: Universal Music, Eagle Rock
- Producer: Kevin Elson, Neal Schon

Journey chronology
Greatest Hits 2 (2011)	Live in Japan 2017: Escape + Frontiers (2019)	Freedom (2022)

Live in Japan 2017: Escape + Frontiers is a live album by the American rock band Journey, recorded in 2017 and released in 2019.

== Track listing ==
Escape
No.	Title	Writer(s)	Length
1.	"Don't Stop Believin' Intro"		0:53
2.	"Don't Stop Believin'"	Jonathan Cain; Steve Perry; Neal Schon	5:48
3.	"Stone in Love"	Cain; Perry; Schon	5:29
4.	"Who's Crying Now"	Cain; Perry	6:58
5.	"Keep On Runnin'"	Cain; Perry; Schon	4:40
6.	"Still They Ride"	Cain; Perry; Schon	4:52
7.	"Escape"	Cain; Perry; Schon	5:16
8.	"Lay It Down"	Cain; Perry; Schon	4:22
9.	"Dead or Alive"	Cain; Perry; Schon	3:43
10.	"Neal Schon Guitar Solo"		2:39
11.	"Mother, Father"	Cain; Perry; Matt Schon; N. Schon	5:38
12.	"Jonathan Cain Piano Solo"		0:59
13.	"Open Arms"	Cain; Perry	4:43

Frontiers
No.	Title	Writer(s)	Length
1.	"Separate Ways Intro"		2:14
2.	"Separate Ways (Worlds Apart)"	Steve Perry; Jonathan Cain	5:31
3.	"Send Her My Love"	Perry; Cain	3:53
4.	"Chain Reaction"	Perry; Neal Schon; Cain	5:13
5.	"After the Fall"	Perry; Cain	6:17
6.	"Faithfully"	Cain	5:08
7.	"Edge of the Blade"	Perry; Schon; Cain	4:54
8.	"Steve Smith Drum Solo"		1:40
9.	"Back Talk"	Perry; Cain; Steve Smith	3:30
10.	"Frontiers"	Perry; Schon; Cain; Smith	4:04
11.	"Rubicon"	Perry; Schon; Cain	6:30
12.	"La Raza Del Sol"	Perry; Cain	12:59
13.	"Lovin', Touchin', Squeezin'"	Perry	10:44

== Personnel ==
Journey

- Neal Schon – lead guitar, backing vocals
- Jonathan Cain – keyboards, piano, rhythm guitar, backing vocals
- Ross Valory – bass, backing vocals
- Arnel Pineda – lead vocals
- Steve Smith – drums

Additional musicians and production

- Travis Thibodaux – keyboards, backing vocals, lead vocals
- Kevin Elson – producer, engineer, mixing, live sound
- Clifford Bonnell – live recording assistant engineer
- Daniel Aumais – live recording assistant engineer
- Guy Charbonneau – live recording assistant engineer
- Akira Fukuda – live recording assistant engineer
- Tom Suzuki – live recording assistant engineer
- Wally Buck – studio recording assistant engineer
- Bob Ludwig – mastering
