= Red 13 =

EP by Journey
- Released: November 26, 2002
- Recorded: 2001–2002
- Studio: Wildhorse Studio (Novato, CA)
- Genres: Rock, hard rock
- Length: 24:26
- Label: Journey Music
- Producers: Neal Schon, Jonathan Cain

Journey chronology
The Essential Journey (2001)	Red 13 (2002)	Generations (2005)

Alternative cover
- Original EP cover

Red 13 is an EP by the American rock band Journey released on November 26, 2002.

== History ==
The EP was the first released on the band's own label, Journey Music. Originally sold only via the band's website, the online edition featured cover art by Kelly McDonald and, later, with cover art created by one of their fans (Christopher Payne), worldwide.

Red 13 is an experimental EP recorded by the band as a thank you to their fans for standing by Journey. The four songs range from a slight return to their progressive roots, a bluesy hard rocker, a cinematic ballad with a dark side and their trademark melodic rock.

"Walkin' Away from the Edge", which was co-written with then-Queensrÿche frontman Geoff Tate (despite Tate not receiving a writing credit), was originally recorded by the band during the Arrival sessions, but ultimately not used.

== Track listing ==
No.	Title	Writer(s)	Length
1.	"Intro: Red 13 / State of Grace"	Jonathan Cain / Neal Schon, Cain, Steve Augeri	7:26
2.	"The Time"	Schon, Cain, Augeri, Gary Cirimelli	6:25
3.	"Walkin' Away from the Edge"	Cain, Schon, André Pessis, Geoff Tate	6:16
4.	"I Can Breathe"	Schon, Cain, Augeri, Taylor Rhodes	4:19

== Personnel ==
Band members

- Steve Augeri – lead vocals
- Neal Schon – lead guitar, backing vocals
- Ross Valory – bass, backing vocals
- Deen Castronovo – drums, percussion, backing vocals
- Jonathan Cain – keyboards, rhythm guitar, backing vocals

Production

- Engineer – Jonathan Cain
- Mixing – Jonathan Cain, Neal Schon and Gary Cirimelli
