= Freedom (Journey album) =

Studio album by Journey
- Released: July 8, 2022
- Recorded: 2021
- Studios: Tarpan Studio (San Rafael, California); Yo Mama's House (Hollywood, California); Left On Sunset (Hollywood, California); NRG Recording Studios (Los Angeles, California); Addiction Sound (Nashville, Tennessee); Dreamsong (Orlando, Florida)
- Length: 73:12
- Label: BMG
- Producers: Neal Schon; Jonathan Cain; Narada Michael Walden

Journey chronology
Live in Japan 2017: Escape + Frontiers (2019)	Freedom (2022)	Live in Concert at Lollapalooza (2022)

Singles from Freedom
- 1. "The Way We Used to Be" Released: June 24, 2021; 2. "You Got the Best of Me" Released: April 26, 2022; 3. "Let It Rain" Released: May 17, 2022; 4. "Don't Give Up on Us" Released: June 7, 2022; 5. "United We Stand" Released: July 4, 2022

Professional ratings
Review scores
Source	Rating
AllMusic	2.5/5 stars
Classic Rock	4.5/5 stars
Riff Magazine	5/10

Freedom is the fifteenth studio album by the American rock band Journey, released on July 8, 2022, through BMG Rights Management and Frontiers Records. It is the band's second album to date not to feature founding bassist Ross Valory, who was dismissed in 2020; he was replaced by Randy Jackson, who previously replaced Valory on Raised on Radio (1986). With 15 songs and a runtime of one hour and 13 minutes, it is the longest studio album Journey ever released.

Upon its release, Freedom received mixed critical reviews—despite the performances and musicianship receiving near-universal praise, criticism was directed at its production, mixing, and length.

== Background and title ==
The album's 11-year gap from Eclipse (2011) marked the longest between two Journey studio albums to date. It is the only Journey album to feature drummer and producer Narada Michael Walden, as well as the first album to feature bassist Randy Jackson since Raised on Radio (1986). Both departed the group before its release.

The album's title of Freedom was the original title of the group's 1986 album Raised on Radio, but was changed by then lead singer and album producer Steve Perry.

== Track listing ==
All tracks are written by Neal Schon, Jonathan Cain, and Narada Michael Walden, except where noted.

No.	Title	Writer(s)	Length
1.	"Together We Run"	Walden; Rachel Efron; Randy Jackson; Cain; Schon	4:49
2.	"Don't Give Up on Us"		5:23
3.	"Still Believe in Love"		5:16
4.	"You Got the Best of Me"		5:33
5.	"Live to Love Again"	Cain	5:30
6.	"The Way We Used to Be"		3:35
7.	"Come Away with Me"		4:02
8.	"After Glow"		5:22
9.	"Let It Rain"		4:40
10.	"Holdin' On"	Schon; Cain; Jackson; Walden	3:14
11.	"All Day and All Night"		3:38
12.	"Don't Go"	Arnel Pineda; Schon; Walden; Cain	4:58
13.	"United We Stand"	Schon; Cain; Jackson; Walden	5:05
14.	"Life Rolls On"	Schon; Walden	4:57
15.	"Beautiful as You Are"		7:10
Total length:			73:12

Japanese edition bonus track
No.	Title	Writer(s)	Length
16.	"Hard to Let It Go"	Cain	4:08

Notes

- The CD released by BMG does not list Walden among the writers of "The Way We Used to Be".

== Personnel ==
Journey

- Neal Schon – guitars, backing vocals, keyboards, producer
- Jonathan Cain – keyboards (all tracks except "All Day and All Night" and "Don't Go"), backing vocals, synth bass on "Still Believe in Love", producer
- Arnel Pineda – lead vocals (all tracks except "After Glow")
- Randy Jackson – bass (all tracks except "Still Believe in Love"), backing vocals
- Narada Michael Walden – drums, backing vocals, keyboards, producer
- Jason Derlatka – backing vocals (tracks 5, 6, 9, 12, 14, 15)
- Deen Castronovo – lead vocals on "After Glow"

Production and design

- Bob Clearmountain – engineer
- Adam Ayan – engineer
- Jim Reitzel – engineer
- Keith Gretlein – engineer
- David Kalmusky – engineer

== Charts ==
Chart performance for Freedom
Chart (2022)	Peak position
Austrian Albums (Ö3 Austria)	23
Belgian Albums (Ultratop Flanders)	25
Belgian Albums (Ultratop Wallonia)	77
Dutch Albums (Album Top 100)	65
German Albums (Offizielle Top 100)	7
Japanese Albums (Oricon)	22
Japanese Hot Albums (Billboard Japan)	29
Scottish Albums (Official Charts)	8
Spanish Albums (Promusicae)	92
Swiss Albums (Schweizer Hitparade)	2
UK Albums (Official Charts)	87
UK Independent Albums (Official Charts)	3
US Billboard 200	88
US Independent Albums (Billboard)	9
US Top Rock Albums (Billboard)	17
