= Danny Vaughn =

American singer

- Born: Daniel Himler; July 18, 1961 (age 64)
- Genres: Hard rock, glam metal
- Occupations: Singer, musician, songwriter
- Instruments: Vocals; guitar
- Years active: 1986–present
- Labels: Geffen; Music for Nations; CMC International; Frontiers
- Member of: Tyketto
- Formerly of: Waysted; Vaughn
- Website: dannyvaughn.com

Danny Vaughn (born Daniel Himler; July 18, 1961) is an American rock and heavy metal singer. He was the singer for Waysted from 1985 to 1987 and appeared on their album Save Your Prayers. He then formed the band Tyketto and appeared on their first two albums. Vaughn left that band in 1995 but participated in periodic reunions starting in 2004. He has also fronted the band Vaughn and released solo music under the name Danny Vaughn.

== Discography ==
=== Solo albums ===
- Traveller (2007)
- Myths, Legends and Lies (2019)

Live albums

- The Road Less Travelled (2009)

Extended plays

- Standing Alone (2002)

=== with Waysted ===
- Save Your Prayers (1986)

=== with Tyketto ===
- Don't Come Easy (1991)
- Strength In Numbers (1994)
- Dig In Deep (2012)
- Reach (2016)
- Closer To The Sun (2026)

=== with Flesh & Blood ===
- Blues for Daze (1997)

=== with Vaughn ===
- Soldiers and Sailors on Riverside (2000)
- Fearless (2001)

=== with From the Inside ===
- From the Inside (2004)
- Visions (2008)

=== with The Illegal Eagles ===
- Back in the Fast Lane (2008)

=== with Burning Kingdom ===
- Simplified (2013)

=== with Snake Oil & Harmony (Dan Reed) ===
- Hurricane Riders (2020)

=== with Rage of Angels ===
- Dreamworld (2013) (tracks 4, 8)
