= Tyketto =

American hard rock band

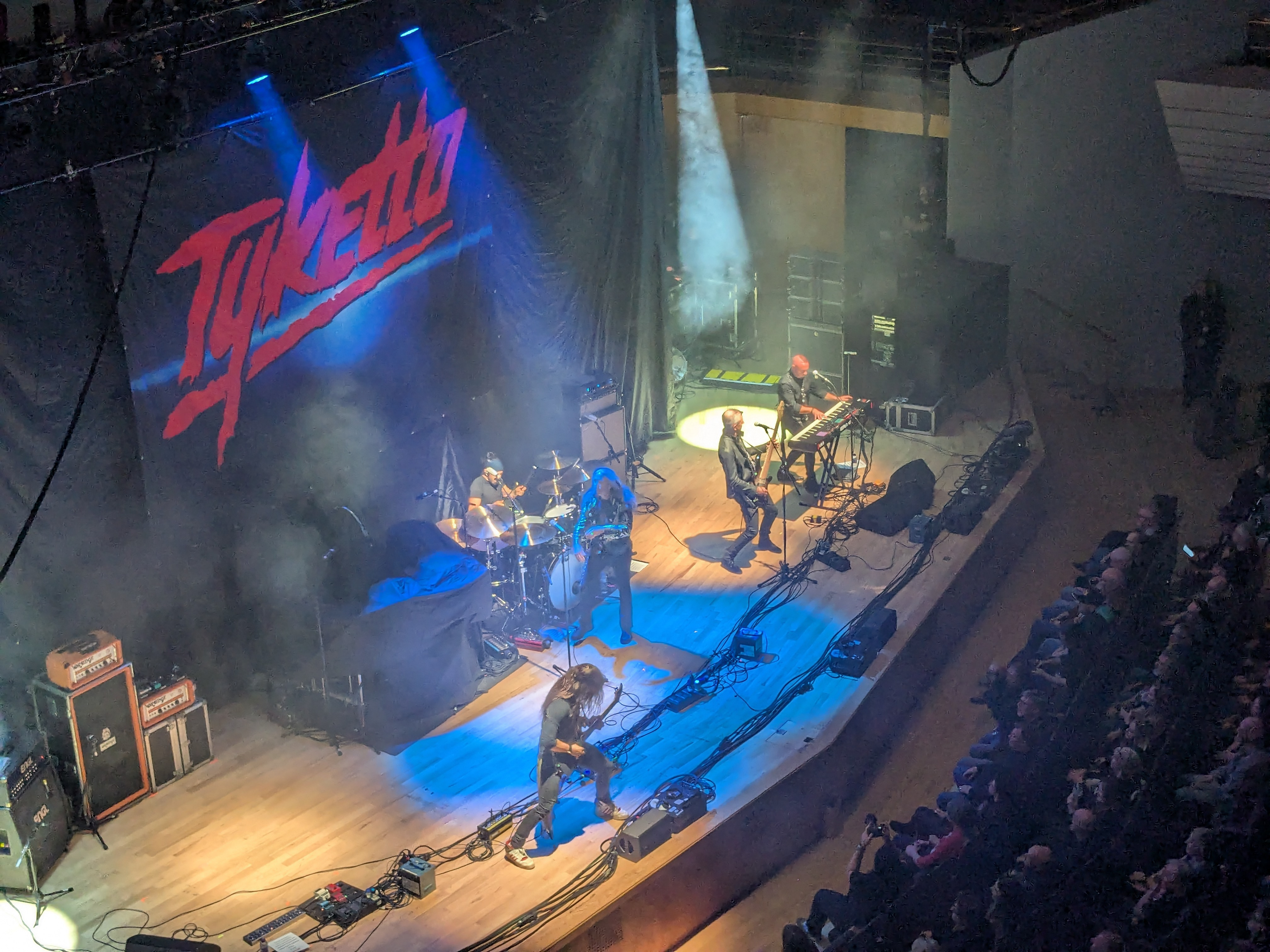
- Tyketto performing at the Bridgewater Hall, Manchester in 2025

Background information
- Origin: New York City, U.S.
- Genres: Hard rock, AOR, glam metal
- Years active: 1987–1996, 2004, 2007, 2008–present
- Labels: Geffen, Music for Nations, CMC International
- Members: Danny Vaughn; Ged Rylands; Chris Childs; Johnny Dee; Harry Scott Elliott
- Past members: Steve Augeri; P.J. Zitarosa; Jaimie Scott; Jimi Kennedy; Brooke St. James; Bobby Lynch; Michael Clayton; Chris Green; Greg Smith
- Website: tyketto.com

Tyketto is an American hard rock band based in New York City. It was formed in 1987 by former Waysted vocalist Danny Vaughn alongside guitarist Brooke St. James, bassist Jimi Kennedy, and drummer Michael Clayton.

== History ==
The band's name Tyketto was originally spotted by the members as graffiti on a wall in Brooklyn. By 1989, the band had signed to Geffen Records and released their debut album Don't Come Easy, which included the single "Forever Young". The rise of the grunge sound in 1991 saw Tyketto's hopes of a big breakthrough begin to recede. Kennedy left the band and was replaced by Jaimie Scott. Their second album was rejected by Geffen and finally emerged in 1994 under the title Strength in Numbers on CMC International in the U.S. and Music for Nations elsewhere in the world.

Vaughn left the band in 1995 and was replaced by former Tall Stories vocalist Steve Augeri (who later joined Journey). This line-up released the album Shine, again on CMC/Music for Nations. The band split in 1996 with most of the members moving on to other projects.

The original lineup reunited in 2004 and various permutations of the band with original and new members have released two additional albums with periodic tours.

== Members ==
=== Current ===
- Danny Vaughn – lead vocals, acoustic guitars, harmonica, percussion (1987–1995, 2004, 2007, 2008–present)
- Ged Rylands – keyboards, backing vocals (2012–present)
- Chris Childs – bass guitar, backing vocals (2014–2017, 2023–present)
- Johnny Dee – drums, backing vocals (2023–present)
- Harry Scott Elliott – lead guitar (2023–present)

=== Past ===
- Michael Clayton (Arbeeny) – drums, percussion, backing vocals (1987–1996, 2004, 2007, 2008–2023)
- Brooke St. James (David Rundall) – lead guitar, keyboards, percussion, backing vocals (1987–1996, 2004, 2007, 2011–2014)
- Jimi Kennedy – bass guitar, percussion, backing vocals (1987–1991, 2004, 2007, 2008–2014)
- James Dilella – keyboards, guitar (1987–1988) (founding member; co-wrote "Forever Young")
- Jaimie Scott – bass guitar, backing vocals (1991–1996)
- Steve Augeri – lead vocals (1995–1996)
- P.J. Zitarosa – lead guitar, backing vocals (2008–2011)
- Bobby Lynch – keyboards, backing vocals (2011–2012)
- Chris Green – lead guitar, backing vocals (2014–2023)
- Greg Smith – bass guitar, backing vocals (2017–2023)

== Discography ==
=== Studio albums ===
- Don't Come Easy (1991)
- Strength in Numbers (1994)
- Shine (1995)
- Dig in Deep (2012)
- Reach (2016)
- Closer to the Sun (2026)

=== Live albums ===
- Take Out & Served Up Live (1996)
- Live from Milan (2017)
- We've Got Tomorrow, We've Got Tonight (2018)
- Strength in Numbers Live (2019)

=== Compilation albums ===
- The Last Sunset – Farewell 2007 (2007)
