= Steve Augeri =

American rock singer

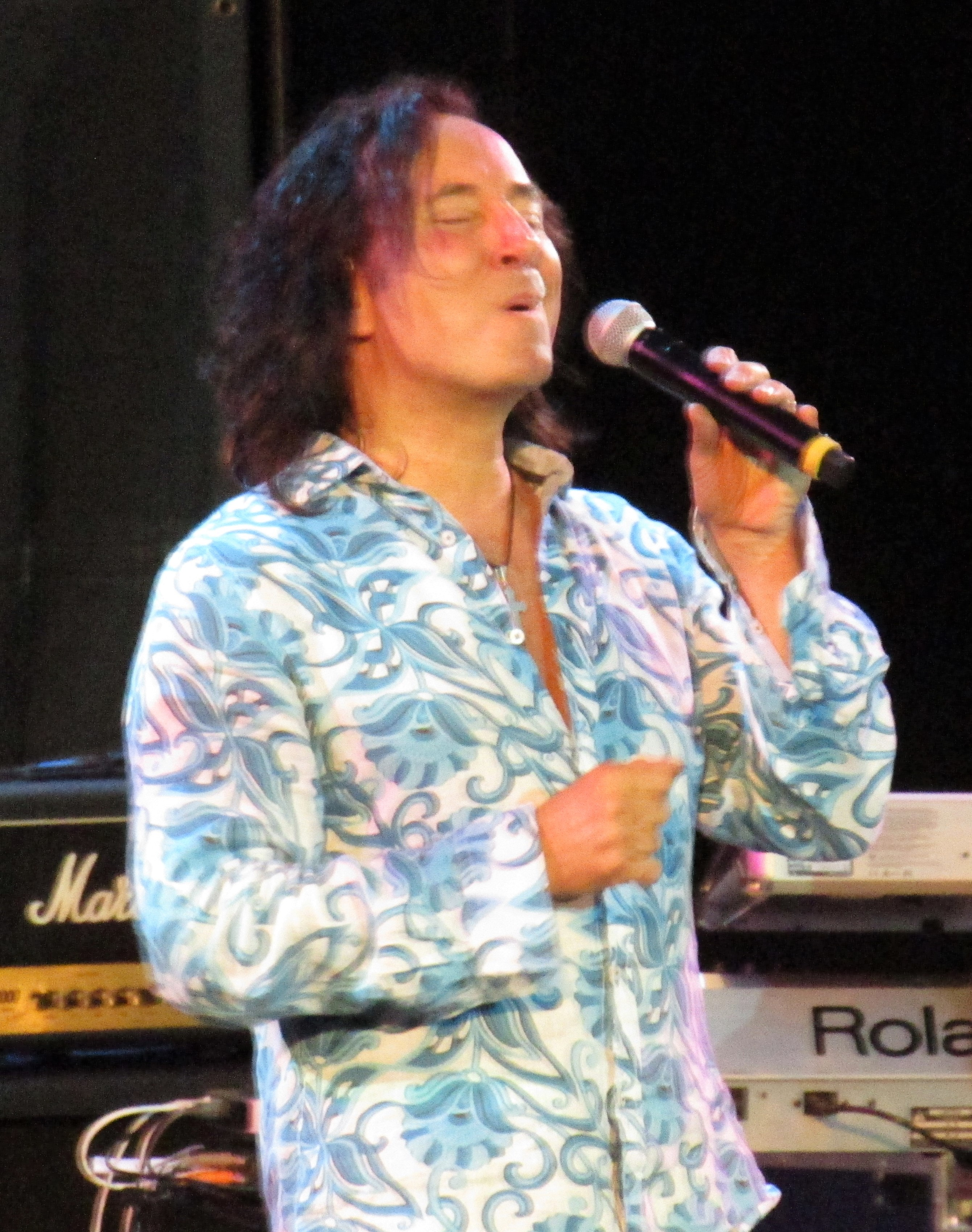
- Augeri performing in 2018

Background information
- Born: January 30, 1959 (age 67); New York City, U.S.
- Genres: Hard rock, pop rock, blues rock
- Occupations: Singer, songwriter
- Website: steveaugeri.com

Steve Augeri (born January 30, 1959) is an American rock singer best known for his work as the lead singer of Journey from 1998 to 2006. He has also provided lead vocals for Tall Stories, Tyketto, and the Steve Augeri Band. He is a member of the supergroup Bad Penny.

== Early life and education ==
Steve Augeri, the son of Joseph and Emma Augeri, was born on January 30, 1959, and raised in the Bensonhurst neighborhood of Brooklyn.

Initially studying woodwinds at New York City's High School of Music and Art, Augeri switched to bassoon and soon discovered his love for classical music.

== Career ==
Augeri has taught at French Woods Festival for the Performing Arts Summer Camp. He also sang with Michael Ward of The Innocent Criminals.

Augeri, along with guitarist Jack Morer, bass player Kevin Totoian, and drummer Tom De Faria, formed the band Tall Stories in 1988 in New York City. Tall Stories was nominated for “Best Debut Album”, and Augeri for “Best Debut Male Vocalist”, at the 1992 New York Music Awards. Tall Stories disbanded in 1995.

Augeri provided lead vocals on Tyketto's 1995 album, Shine, and its 1996 album, Take Out & Served Up Live.

Augeri was working as a maintenance manager at the GAP when he received a phone call from Jonathan Cain and Neal Schon of Journey offering him an audition. Augeri joined Journey as lead vocalist in 1998. He has stated that replacing Steve Perry as the band's lead singer was "incredibly daunting". The song "Remember Me", from the soundtrack album from the movie Armageddon, represents Augeri's recording debut with the band. Augeri recorded three albums with Journey: Arrival (2001), the EP Red 13 (2002), and Generations (2005). The live DVD of Journey's Las Vegas concert recorded in December 2000, entitled Journey 2001, acquired platinum status. Augeri left the band in 2006 due to vocal problems.

Augeri and his wife Lydia have supported various charities with personal appearances and live performances, including Journey to the Cure (Breast Cancer Foundation), Little Baby Face Foundation, Diamond Angels (Joe DiMaggio Children's Hospital), and March of Dimes.

Augeri has stated that he formed the Steve Augeri Band in 2012. He has toured with the band and has recorded as a solo artist.

Augeri and others formed the supergroup Bad Penny in 2020.

== Personal life ==
Augeri is married to Lydia Augeri and has a son, Adam Augeri. As of 2020, Augeri resided in Staten Island, New York.

== Discography ==
Augeri performing in 2013

=== Solo ===
- Seven Ways 'Til Sunday (2022)

=== with Tall Stories ===
- Tall Stories (1991)
- Skyscraper (2009)

=== with Tyketto ===
- Shine (1995)
- Take Out and Served Up Live (1996)

=== with Journey ===
- "Remember Me", from the movie soundtrack Armageddon (1998)
- Journey 2001 (2001, DVD)

Albums

- Arrival (2000)
- Red 13 (EP - 2002)
- Generations (2005)

=== with Steve Augeri Band ===
Singles

- "Riverside" (2010)
- "Photograph" (2011)
- "Hours in the Day" (2012)
- "Rich Mans World" (2012)
- "Home This Christmas Time" (2012)
- "Behind the Sun" (feat. Tom DeRossi) (2013)
- "For the Rest of My Life" (2013)
- "Home Again" (2014)
- "Tin Soldier" (2014)
- "Faces" (2014)
- "In the Moment" (2015)
- "Riverside (Mississippi Mix)" (2015)
- "World of Our Own" (2017)

=== with Bad Penny ===
Singles

- "Lose Myself" (2021)
- "Don't Forget (This Christmas)" (2021)
