= Tall Stories (band) =

- Genres: Hard rock
- Years active: 1990-1995, 2007-present

Tall Stories is an American hard rock band made up of singer Steve Augeri, who also sang for Tyketto and Journey, guitarist Jack Morer, bass guitarist Kevin Totoian and drummer Tom DeFaria. The band formed in 1988 in New York, United States.

Tall Stories released a self-titled album on August 27, 1991, on Epic Records, and reunited briefly after Augeri's departure from Journey in 2008.

Tall Stories performed at Firefest V on October 26, 2008, in Nottingham, England. Their setlist included songs from their 1991 release, as well as new songs from the album, Skyscraper, which was released on January 23, 2009, via Frontiers Records.
