= Trial by Fire (Journey album) =

Studio album by Journey
- Released: October 22, 1996
- Recorded: Summer 1996
- Studios: Ocean Way Recording, Hollywood; The Site, Marin County, California; Wildhorse, Marin County, California
- Genre: Rock
- Length: 71:14 (Original); 75:26 (Japan and 2006 re-release)
- Label: Columbia
- Producer: Kevin Shirley

Journey studio album chronology
Raised on Radio (1986)	Trial by Fire (1996)	Arrival (2000)

Singles from Trial by Fire
- 1. "When You Love a Woman" Released: September 24, 1996; 2. "Message of Love" Released: 1996 (EU)

Professional ratings
Review scores
Source	Rating
AllMusic	1.5/5 stars

Trial by Fire is the tenth studio album by the American rock band Journey. Released on October 22, 1996, the album marked the reunion of the classic 1981–1985 lineup, which had not recorded together since 1983's Frontiers. Trial by Fire was produced by Kevin Shirley, who continues to produce the band's albums. It is the first album to feature bassist Ross Valory and drummer Steve Smith since Frontiers and the last studio album to feature Smith and vocalist Steve Perry.

Trial by Fire includes the Top 20 hit and Grammy nominated single "When You Love a Woman", which reached No. 12 and No. 1 on the Billboard Hot 100 and Adult Contemporary charts respectively. "Message of Love", "Can't Tame the Lion" and "If He Should Break Your Heart" were released as singles and received radio airplay.

The album reflected a growing maturity with the members of Journey and could be loosely termed a concept album with many tracks reflecting a more overt spirituality in lyrical content. The title track, for example, is taken directly from Paul's Second Epistle to the Corinthians.

Trial by Fire is Journey's only album to not be accompanied by a supporting tour. That was due to internal disputes over a tour (originally scheduled for the summer and fall of 1997), as a result of Perry's hip injury as he was unsure about getting the necessary surgery. The band ultimately gave him the choice of either getting the surgery or being replaced with a new lead vocalist, resulting in his departure. Drummer Steve Smith also quit citing that the band without Perry did not interest him; he would subsequently return in 2015, but was dismissed from the band again in 2020.

On November 9, 1996, the album entered at No. 3 on the Billboard 200 and was eventually certified platinum in the United States by the RIAA. The band did not receive another platinum award until Revelation in 2008.

== Background ==
Trial by Fire was Journey's first studio album in ten years, following Raised on Radio in 1986 and the band's subsequent split. Neal Schon and Jonathan Cain had formed supergroup Bad English and released albums in 1989 and 1991, while singer Steve Perry released his second solo album, For the Love of Strange Medicine (1994). While on a solo tour in 1994, it became apparent to Perry that "underneath it all, I was missing more and more being the singer in Journey than I ever thought I would." When A&R executive John Kalodner of Columbia Records suggested the band reform, Cain, Perry, and Schon began writing together. According to Perry, they wanted to "see if we had the spark to write again" instead of simply reforming for a comeback tour. "I was invited – and quickly uninvited," recalled Gregg Rolie, who had left in 1980.

Perry said the band did not try to reinvent themselves on the album: "Nothing sounds more pretentious than someone being something they're not. One of the things we've always known is that there are certain musical directions that fit what [our] chemistry is about. We're going to sink or swim being what we are and not by trying to reinvent ourselves and not by trying to be the flavor of the month."

== Critical reception ==
Reviewing the material for Record Collector, Tim Jones observed that the members exhibited prime adult oriented rock ballad form, supplemented by several uptempo tracks. He noted that while the overall energy levels did not reach the heights of the collective's early 1980s output, "Message of Love" stood out as an exceptional track, showcasing superb vocals, harmonies, and guitar work. Additionally, Jones praised "One More" for its refined guitar playing and sharp lead vocals. He commented that the abundant tender moments, characterized by delicate piano passages and strings, were effectively balanced by the Bryan Adams-style rock track "Can't Tame the Lion"—which highlighted guitarist Neal Schon's performance—and a jazzy title track. Ultimately, Jones characterized the release as a soothing representation of the group in a relaxed, comfortable mode.

== Track listing ==
All tracks are written by Steve Perry, Neal Schon, and Jonathan Cain except where noted.

No.	Title	Writer(s)	Length
1.	"Message of Love"	Perry; Schon; Cain; John Bettis	5:34
2.	"One More"		5:28
3.	"When You Love a Woman"		4:07
4.	"If He Should Break Your Heart"		4:23
5.	"Forever in Blue"		3:35
6.	"Castles Burning"		6:00
7.	"Don't Be Down on Me Baby"		4:01
8.	"Still She Cries"		5:04
9.	"Colors of the Spirit"	Perry; Cain; Schon; Bettis	5:41
10.	"When I Think of You"	Perry; Cain	4:21
11.	"Easy to Fall"		5:15
12.	"Can't Tame the Lion"		4:32
13.	"It's Just the Rain"	Perry; Cain	5:19
14.	"Trial by Fire"		4:41
15.	"Baby I'm a Leavin' You" (hidden track)		2:49
16.	"I Can See It in Your Eyes" (Japanese-only bonus track on the original CD release, appearing as track 13, later added to the 2006 CD reissue)		4:12

== Personnel ==
Journey

- Steve Perry – lead vocals
- Neal Schon – guitars, backing vocals
- Jonathan Cain – keyboards, backing vocals, additional acoustic guitars, engineer
- Ross Valory – bass guitar, backing vocals
- Steve Smith – drums

Additional musicians

- Paulinho da Costa – percussion
- Scott Pinkerton – programming
- David Campbell – string arrangements

Production

- Kevin Shirley – producer, engineer, mixing
- George Massenburg – engineer, mixing
- John Hurlbut, Bob Levy – engineers
- George Marino – mastering
- John Kalodner – A&R

== Charts ==
Chart (1996)	Peak position
Canada Top Albums/CDs (RPM)	16
Dutch Albums (Album Top 100)	89
German Albums (Offizielle Top 100)	62
Japanese Albums (Oricon)	6
Swedish Albums (Sverigetopplistan)	24
UK Albums (Official Charts)	84
US Billboard 200	3

== Certifications and sales ==
Region	Certification	Certified units/sales
Canada (Music Canada)	Gold	50,000^{^}
Japan (RIAJ)	Gold	100,000^{^}
United States (RIAA)	Platinum	1,000,000^{^}
^{^} Shipments figures based on certification alone.
