= Generations (Journey album) =

Studio album by Journey
- Released: October 4, 2005
- Recorded: February–March 2005
- Studios: The Plant, Sausalito, California; Prairie Sun Studios, Cotati, California; Laughing Dog Studios, New York City
- Genres: Rock, hard rock
- Length: 73:12
- Labels: Sanctuary (US); Frontiers (Europe); King (Japan); Seoul (South Korea)
- Producer: Kevin Elson

Journey studio album chronology
Arrival (2000)	Generations (2005)	Revelation (2008)

Professional ratings
Review scores
Source	Rating
About.com	4/5 stars
AllMusic	3.5/5 stars
Blogcritics	3/5 stars

Generations is the twelfth studio album by the American rock band Journey. It was the band's second and final album with lead singer Steve Augeri. The album was given away for free by the band during most of the concerts of the Generations Tour in 2005, and subsequently released on Sanctuary Records later the same year, the only Journey album to be released by the label.

This was the first Journey album where all of the band members share lead vocal duties, which Augeri later admitted in 2022 was due to his voice suffering from fatigue at the time. Jonathan Cain sings lead on "Every Generation" and "Pride of the Family" (the latter of which is only found on the Japanese edition), the first time he sang lead since "All That Really Matters" (originally a Frontiers outtake) from the Time^{3} box set. Deen Castronovo sings lead on "A Better Life" and "Never Too Late". Neal Schon provides lead vocals for "In Self Defense" (previously recorded for the Schon & Hammer album Here to Stay) and Ross Valory lends his vocals to "Gone Crazy".

Critical reception was mixed upon the album's release; Most critics praised Augeri's vocal performance and the band's more diverse musical direction compared to previous albums, but many were divided on the band's decision to share lead vocals.

The album peaked at No. 170 on the Billboard 200 album chart.

The latter portion of the song "Faith in the Heartland" was heard during the December 10, 2006 edition of NBC's Football Night in America, during a segment about Dallas Cowboys quarterback Tony Romo. "Faith in the Heartland" and "The Place in Your Heart" were re-recorded by the band with new vocalist Arnel Pineda on their 2008 album Revelation, but "The Place in Your Heart" was only released as a bonus track on the Japanese edition of that album.

== Track listing ==
No.	Title	Writer(s)	Lead vocals	Length
1.	"Faith in the Heartland"	Neal Schon; Jonathan Cain; Steve Augeri	Augeri	6:56
2.	"The Place in Your Heart"	N. Schon; Cain	Augeri	4:20
3.	"A Better Life"	N. Schon; Cain	Castronovo	5:40
4.	"Every Generation"	N. Schon; Cain	Cain	5:52
5.	"Butterfly (She Flies Alone)"	Augeri	Augeri	5:56
6.	"Believe"	Augeri; Tommy De Rossi	Augeri	5:41
7.	"Knowing That You Love Me"	Cain	Augeri	5:21
8.	"Out of Harms Way"	N. Schon; Cain	Augeri	5:14
9.	"In Self-Defense"	N. Schon; Cain; Steve Perry	Schon	3:10
10.	"Better Together"	N. Schon; Cain; Augeri	Augeri	5:05
11.	"Gone Crazy"	N. Schon; Amber Schon; Cain; Kim Tribble	Valory	4:04
12.	"Beyond the Clouds"	N. Schon; Augeri	Augeri	6:54

Bonus track
No.	Title	Writer(s)	Lead vocals	Length
13.	"Never Too Late"	N. Schon; Cain; Jack Blades	Castronovo	4:59

Japanese version
No.	Title	Writer(s)	Lead vocals	Length
13.	"The Pride of the Family"	Cain	Cain	4:00
14.	"Never Too Late"	N. Schon; Cain; Jack Blades	Castronovo	4:59

== Personnel ==
Journey

- Steve Augeri – lead vocals (except where noted), additional guitar on "Butterfly (She Flies Alone)" and "Believe"
- Neal Schon – lead guitar, backing vocals, lead vocals on "In Self-Defense"
- Jonathan Cain – keyboards, rhythm guitar, backing vocals, lead vocals on "Every Generation" and "Pride of the Family"
- Ross Valory – bass, backing vocals, lead vocals on "Gone Crazy"
- Deen Castronovo – drums, percussion, backing vocals, lead vocals on "A Better Life" and "Never Too Late"

Production and design

- Kevin Elson – producer
- Mike Fraser – engineer, mixing
- Tom Size – engineer
- Bill Donnelly – engineer
- Stephen Marcussen – mastering

== Charts ==
Chart (2005)	Peak position
German Albums (Offizielle Top 100)	70
Japanese Albums (Oricon)	20
Swedish Albums (Sverigetopplistan)	39
UK Independent Albums (Official Charts)	23
US Billboard 200	170
