= Lights (Journey song) =

- Japan picture sleeve

Single by Journey

from the album Infinity
- B-side: "Opened the Door"
- Released: June 16, 1978 (UK); August 1978 (US)
- Recorded: 1977
- Genre: Soft rock
- Length: 3:09
- Label: Columbia
- Songwriters: Steve Perry, Neal Schon
- Producer: Roy Thomas Baker

Journey singles chronology
"Anytime" (1978)	"Lights" (1978)	"Just the Same Way" (1979)

Music video
- "Lights" on YouTube

"Lights" is a song recorded by American rock band Journey and written by Steve Perry and Neal Schon, released in 1978.

== Background and writing ==
The song is about Journey's city of origin, San Francisco, although it was actually written in and originally intended to be about Los Angeles. It was one of Steve Perry's first Journey songs, and was recorded soon after joining the band. In an interview, Perry said, "I had the song written in Los Angeles almost completely except for the bridge and it was written about Los Angeles. It was 'when the lights go down in the city and the sun shines on L-A.' I didn't like the way it sounded at the time. And so I just had it sitting back in the corner. Then life changed my plans once again, and I was now facing joining Journey. I love San Francisco, the bay, and the whole thing. 'The bay' fit so nice, 'When the lights go down in the city and the sun shines on the bay.' It was one of those early-morning-going-across-the-bridge things, when the sun was coming up and the lights were going down. It was perfect."

Released as a single in 1978, it was originally only a minor hit, reaching number 68 on the Billboard Hot 100 at the time. It has, however, become more popular over the years and is now one of Journey's most popular and easily recognizable songs and is often played in Classic Hits/Oldies radio stations. It is frequently played at San Francisco Giants baseball games (including versions led by Perry himself at Game 2 of the 2010 World Series, Games 1 and 2 of the 2012 World Series, and Games 4 and 5 of the 2014 World Series) and the cross-bay Oakland Athletics after-game fireworks starts. The song is now usually played at Levi's Stadium when the NFL San Francisco 49ers win a home game. It is sometimes used in promos for the Golden State Warriors. The song was also played right before the start of game 4 of the 1989 World Series on ABC Sports.

Journey released a live version of the song in 1993 for the Time³ box set. This recording reached #30 on the Adult Contemporary chart.

The song was the last to be played during the Top 40 era of KFRC, a legendary San Francisco radio station, before a format change to nostalgia/adult standards in 1986.

Television station KIII, the ABC affiliate in Corpus Christi, Texas used this song during their sign-offs in the late 1980s.

== Reception ==
Cash Box praised the "searching guitar work" and "excellent lead and backing vocals." Record World said that it "has an easy '50s rock beat and an outstanding lead vocal" and that "the sweet high harmony hook is compelling."

== Personnel ==
- Steve Perry – lead vocals
- Neal Schon – guitars, backing vocals
- Gregg Rolie – keyboards, backing vocals
- Ross Valory – bass guitar, backing vocals
- Aynsley Dunbar – drums

== Certifications ==
Region	Certification	Certified units/sales
United States (RIAA)	2× Platinum	2,000,000^{‡}
^{‡} Sales+streaming figures based on certification alone.
