= When You Love a Woman =

1996 single by Journey

Single by Journey

from the album Trial by Fire
- B-side: "Message of Love"; "Open Arms"
- Released: September 24, 1996
- Length: 4:08
- Label: Columbia
- Songwriters: Steve Perry; Neal Schon; Jonathan Cain
- Producer: Kevin Shirley

Journey singles chronology
"Lights" (live) (1993)	"When You Love a Woman" (1996)	"Message of Love" (1996)

Music video
- When You Love a Woman on YouTube

"When You Love a Woman" is a song by American rock band Journey. It is the third track from their 10th studio album, Trial by Fire (1996), and was released as the lead single from that album in September 1996 by Columbia Records. The song reached number one on the US Billboard Adult Contemporary chart, where it stayed for four weeks, and number 12 on both the Billboard Hot 100 and Cash Box Top 100 charts, finishing 1997 as the 57th-best-selling single in the US. In Canada, the song peaked at number three on the RPM 100 Hit Tracks chart and number one on the RPM Adult Contemporary chart. "When You Love a Woman" was nominated for a Grammy Award in the category Best Pop Performance by a Duo or Group.

== Music video ==
The music video for "When You Love a Woman" features the band playing in what appears to be an empty recording studio. The video was directed by American director Wayne Isham. This was one of the last performances with Steve Perry as vocalist. In the video, Neal Schon plays a white Tom Anderson guitar.

== Charts ==
=== Weekly charts ===
Chart (1996–1997)	Peak position
Canada Top Singles (RPM)	3
Canada Adult Contemporary (RPM)	1
Germany (GfK)	78
Iceland (Íslenski Listinn Topp 40)	24
US Billboard Hot 100	12
US Adult Contemporary (Billboard)	1
US Adult Pop Airplay (Billboard)	3
US Pop Airplay (Billboard)	9
US Cash Box Top 100	12

=== Year-end charts ===
Chart (1996)	Position
Canada Top Singles (RPM)	81
Canada Adult Contemporary (RPM)	23
US Top 40/Mainstream (Billboard)	74

Chart (1997)	Position
Canada Top Singles (RPM)	63
Canada Adult Contemporary (RPM)	10
US Billboard Hot 100	57
US Adult Contemporary (Billboard)	5
US Adult Top 40 (Billboard)	28
US Top 40/Mainstream (Billboard)	66

== Certifications ==
Region	Certification	Certified units/sales
United States (RIAA)	Platinum	1,000,000^{‡}
^{‡} Sales+streaming figures based on certification alone.

== See also ==
- List of Billboard Adult Contemporary number ones of 1996
