= Send Her My Love =

Single by Journey

from the album Frontiers
- B-side: "Chain Reaction"
- Released: September 1983
- Recorded: 1982
- Genre: Rock
- Length: 3:55
- Label: Columbia
- Songwriter(s): Jonathan Cain, Steve Perry
- Producer(s): Kevin Elson, Mike Stone

Journey singles chronology
"After the Fall" (1983)	"Send Her My Love" (1983)	"Ask the Lonely" (1983)

Music video
- Send Her My Love on YouTube

"Send Her My Love" is a 1983 song by the American rock band Journey. Released in September of that year as the fourth single from their album Frontiers, this Cain/Perry-penned ballad went to number 23 on the U.S. pop charts in November of the same year.

== Chart history ==
Chart (1983)	Peak position
US Billboard Hot 100	23
US Adult Contemporary	27

== Personnel ==
- Steve Perry - lead vocals
- Neal Schon - guitar, vocals
- Ross Valory - bass, vocals
- Jonathan Cain - keyboards, vocals
- Steve Smith - drums, percussion

== Certifications ==
Region	Certification	Certified units/sales
United States (RIAA)	Gold	500,000^{‡}
^{‡} Sales+streaming figures based on certification alone.
