= Lovin', Touchin', Squeezin' =

1979 song by Journey

Single by Journey

from the album Evolution
- B-side: "Daydream"
- Released: June 25, 1979 (US): September 1979 (Europe)
- Recorded: 1978
- Studio: Cherokee Studios, Los Angeles, California
- Genre: Rock
- Length: 3:55
- Label: Columbia
- Songwriter: Steve Perry
- Producer: Roy Thomas Baker

Journey singles chronology
"Just The Same Way" (1979)	"Lovin', Touchin', Squeezin'" (1979)	"Too Late" (1980)

Music video
- Lovin', Touchin', Squeezin' on YouTube

"Lovin', Touchin', Squeezin'" is a song by American rock group Journey released as a single in 1979 from the album Evolution. Lyrically, the song is about a woman who is cheating on her boyfriend, the narrator, but at the end of the song the woman's lover is cheating on her. Distraught, the woman goes to the narrator in the hope that he will take her back, but he rebuffs her and tells her "Now it's your time, girl, to cry."

== Chart performance ==
The song was Journey's first Top 40 hit in the United States, reaching No. 16 on the Billboard Hot 100 in November of that year. Outside the US, "Lovin', Touchin', Squeezin'" reached No. 12 in Canada and No. 37 in New Zealand.

== Music video ==
In July 1979, a music video was released for this song. It was directed by Bruce Gowers, best known for directing videos for Queen, Michael Jackson, and Prince.

== Personnel ==
- Steve Perry – lead vocals
- Neal Schon – guitars, backing vocals
- Gregg Rolie – keyboards, piano, backing vocals
- Ross Valory – bass guitar, backing vocals
- Steve Smith – drums, percussion

=== Additional musicians ===
- Greg Werner – backing vocals

== Cover versions ==
- "Lovin', Touchin', Squeezin'" was covered by progressive metal band Dream Theater on their 1995 EP A Change of Seasons, as part of "The Big Medley" which closes the EP.

== Use in media ==
- The original recording of "Lovin', Touchin', Squeezin'" appeared in the pilot episode of Glee and was used and recorded by the cast of Glee in a mash-up with "Any Way You Want It" for the season one finale.
- The song was used in the second episode of the fifteenth season of American Dad!, “Paranoid Frandroid”, as a song on Snot’s jukebox in his basement.
- In episode 2, season 3 of Scrubs, J.D. mentions booking a Journey cover band called the Lovin', Touchin', Squeezins for Turk and Carla's wedding.

== Certifications ==
Region	Certification	Certified units/sales
United States (RIAA)	2× Platinum	2,000,000^{‡}
^{‡} Sales+streaming figures based on certification alone.
