= Frontiers (Journey album) =

Studio album by Journey
- Released: February 1, 1983
- Recorded: 1982
- Studio: Fantasy (Berkeley, California)
- Genres: Pop rock; hard rock; synth-rock
- Length: 44:24
- Label: Columbia
- Producers: Mike Stone, Kevin Elson

Journey chronology
| Escape (1981) | Frontiers (1983) | Raised on Radio (1986) |

Singles from Frontiers
- 1. "Separate Ways (Worlds Apart)" Released: January 1983; 2. "Faithfully" Released: April 1983; 3. "After the Fall" Released: July 1983; 4. "Send Her My Love" Released: September 1983

Frontiers is the eighth studio album by the American rock band Journey, released in February 1, 1983, by Columbia Records. This was the band's last album to feature bassist Ross Valory until 1996's Trial by Fire.

The album reached No. 2 on the Billboard 200 chart and would garner four top 40 singles: "After the Fall" (No. 23), "Send Her My Love" (No. 23), "Faithfully" (No. 12), and "Separate Ways (Worlds Apart)" (No. 8), and a rock radio hit in "Chain Reaction". The album would later achieve the RIAA certification of six times platinum. In 2008, Classic Rock critic Paul Elliott declared "Faithfully" to be "the greatest power ballad of all time".

The album had been sequenced and prepped for pressing when, in a last-minute conference with Journey's A&R man Michael Dillbeck, two songs were pulled from the original lineup, "Ask the Lonely" and "Only the Young". These two tracks were replaced with "Back Talk" and "Troubled Child". "Ask the Lonely" was utilized in the soundtrack for the film Two of a Kind. "Only the Young" would find its way into the Top Ten two years later, as part of the soundtrack of the movie Vision Quest.

Frontiers was the band's highest-charting album in the United Kingdom, reaching No. 6 on the UK Albums Chart in 1983.

== Artwork ==
Jim Welch designed the album cover. This was the first album cover since Next (1977) that did not employ the talents of Stanley Mouse and Alton Kelley.

Welch, who has been Journey's art designer for more than 30 years (as of 2022), commented: "Frontiers was a subtle shift. Mouse and Kelley were not involved with that cover. My vision for Frontiers was based on 'tunnels' and the relativity of time and motion. Light stays the same, but time bends. It was Einstein theories for artist interpretation. The alien in Frontiers wasn't really an alien at all, he was a connection to a higher level of listening to Journey."

== Critical reception ==
Professional ratings
Review scores
| Source | Rating |
|---|---|
| AllMusic | 4/5 stars |
| Rolling Stone | 2/5 stars |
| The Village Voice | D+ |

Frontiers received mixed critical reception. J. D. Considine of Rolling Stone awarded the album two stars out of five, stating, "It's hard to say what Journey is up to on Frontiers." While several band members had signaled a shift toward a less commercial sound, Considine noted, "it's hard to believe that Journey thought there was any risk involved. Indeed, in some ways this is the band's most conservative effort yet." Mike DeGagne of AllMusic gave the album a positive review, though he noted that while they utilized the same "musical recipe" as Escape, Frontiers fell "a little short" because "the keyboards seem to overtake both Schon's guitar playing and Steve Perry's strong singing." Robert Christgau of The Village Voice gave the album a D+, remarking that the album served as a reminder "of how much worse things might be: this top 10 album could be outselling Pyromania, or Flashdance, or even Thriller."

In 2005, Frontiers was ranked number 363 in Rock Hard magazine's book The 500 Greatest Rock and Metal Albums of All Time.

== Track listing ==
Side one
| No. | Title | Writer(s) | Length |
|---|---|---|---|
| 1. | "Separate Ways (Worlds Apart)" | Steve Perry; Jonathan Cain | 5:26 |
| 2. | "Send Her My Love" | Perry; Cain | 3:57 |
| 3. | "Chain Reaction" | Perry; Neal Schon; Cain | 4:22 |
| 4. | "After the Fall" | Perry; Cain | 5:04 |
| 5. | "Faithfully" | Cain | 4:30 |

Side two
| No. | Title | Writer(s) | Length |
|---|---|---|---|
| 6. | "Edge of the Blade" | Perry; Schon; Cain | 4:35 |
| 7. | "Troubled Child" | Perry; Schon; Cain | 4:32 |
| 8. | "Back Talk" | Perry; Cain; Steve Smith | 3:20 |
| 9. | "Frontiers" | Perry; Schon; Cain; Smith | 4:13 |
| 10. | "Rubicon" | Perry; Schon; Cain | 4:20 |
| Total length: | | | 44:24 |

2006 CD reissue bonus tracks
| No. | Title | Writer(s) | Length |
|---|---|---|---|
| 11. | "Only the Young" (from the soundtrack of Vision Quest) | Perry; Schon; Cain | 4:20 |
| 12. | "Ask the Lonely" (from the soundtrack of Two of a Kind) | Perry; Cain | 3:57 |
| 13. | "Liberty" (from Time^{3}) | Schon; Perry; Cain | 2:58 |
| 14. | "Only Solutions" (from the Tron soundtrack) | Cain; Schon; Perry | 3:33 |
| Total length: | | | 58:32 |

2017 Japanese reissue bonus tracks
| No. | Title | Writer(s) | Length |
|---|---|---|---|
| 15. | "Separate Ways (Worlds Apart)" (live) | Perry; Cain | 5:20 |
| 16. | "After the Fall" (live) | Perry; Cain | 5:16 |
| 17. | "Faithfully" (live) | Cain | 4:21 |
| 18. | "Send Her My Love" (live) | Perry; Cain | 3:38 |
| Total length: | | | 67:37 |

== Personnel ==
Band members

- Steve Perry – lead vocals
- Neal Schon – lead guitar, backing vocals
- Jonathan Cain – keyboards, rhythm guitar, backing vocals, Roland Jupiter-8 (track 1)
- Ross Valory – bass guitar, backing vocals
- Steve Smith – drums, percussion

Additional Musicians

- Randy Jackson – bass guitar on "After the Fall"

Production

- Mike Stone – producer, engineer, mixing
- Kevin Elson – producer, mixing
- Wally Buck – assistant engineer
- Bob Ludwig – mastering

== Charts ==
| Chart (1983) | Peak position |
|---|---|
| Australian Albums (Kent Music Report) | 80 |
| Canada Top Albums/CDs (RPM) | 10 |
| German Albums (Offizielle Top 100) | 30 |
| Japanese Albums (Oricon) | 26 |
| Norwegian Albums (VG-lista) | 12 |
| Swedish Albums (Sverigetopplistan) | 21 |
| UK Albums (Official Charts) | 6 |
| US Billboard 200 | 2 |

| Chart (2006) | Peak position |
|---|---|
| Japanese Albums (Oricon) | 143 |

== Certifications ==
| Region | Certification | Certified units/sales |
|---|---|---|
| Canada (Music Canada) | Platinum | 100,000^{^} |
| United States (RIAA) | 6× Platinum | 6,000,000^{^} |
^{^} Shipments figures based on certification alone.
