= Arrival (Journey album) =

- Cover art by Chris Moore

Studio album by Journey
- Released: October 25, 2000 (Japan); April 3, 2001 (US)
- Recorded: 1999–2000
- Studios: Avatar, New York City
- Genre: Arena rock
- Length: 73:57
- Label: Columbia/Sony
- Producer: Kevin Shirley

Journey studio album chronology
Trial by Fire (1996)	Arrival (2000)	Generations (2005)

Japanese edition cover

Professional ratings
Review scores
Source	Rating
AllMusic	3/5 stars
Rolling Stone	(mixed)
PopMatters	(favorable)

Arrival is the eleventh studio album by the American rock band Journey, released in the US on April 3, 2001. A version with one substituted song was released in Japan in 2000. The album was the band's first full-length studio album with new lead vocalist Steve Augeri, who replaced popular frontman Steve Perry, and with Deen Castronovo, who replaced Steve Smith as the band's drummer.

"Arrival" exhibits hard rock influences akin to the band's material from the 1970s and 1980s, while also featuring several ballads in the signature style the band achieved with Perry. Frontman Augeri's vocal work also retains a style quite similar to Perry. While relatively successful commercially, reaching the #12 spot on Billboard's Top Internet Albums chart, Arrival received mixed critical reviews, with some considering the album formulaic, while praising such elements as Neal Schon's guitar playing.

== Album details and reception ==
The album was released in Japan in late 2000, and it leaked to the internet. Negative response from American fans prompted the band to record two more songs with a harder rock edge, and delay the release of the album in the US until these new tracks could be included. The song "I'm Not That Way" was dropped on US version, and the songs "World Gone Wild" and "Nothin' Comes Close" were added.

"All the Way" spent 13 weeks on the Billboard Adult Contemporary Charts, rising as high as No. 22. The album peaked at No. 56 on Billboard's album chart, Arrival was the band's first album to not receive at least a gold certification by the RIAA since 1977's Next. It was also their last studio album under Columbia Records, which had been the band's label since their self-titled 1975 debut.

== Track listing ==
The U.S. and SACD editions do not include "I'm Not That Way" as on the Japanese edition, but instead add "World Gone Wild" and "Nothin' Comes Close". The U.S. CD edition features an edited version of "To Be Alive Again", the full version is only on the Japanese CD.

U.S. edition
No.	Title	Writer(s)	Length
1.	"Higher Place"	Jack Blades; Neal Schon	5:10
2.	"All the Way"	N. Schon; Jonathan Cain; Taylor Rhodes; Steve Augeri	3:35
3.	"Signs of Life"	N. Schon; J. Cain; Elizabeth Cain	4:54
4.	"All the Things"	N. Schon; J. Cain; Andre Pessis	4:24
5.	"Loved by You"	J. Cain; Tammy Hyler; Kim Tribble	4:03
6.	"Livin' to Do"	N. Schon; Matt Schon; J. Cain; Tribble	6:25
7.	"World Gone Wild"	Blades; N. Schon; J. Cain	6:00
8.	"I Got a Reason"	Blades; N. Schon; J. Cain	4:20
9.	"With Your Love"	N. Schon; J. Cain; E. Cain	4:25
10.	"Lifetime of Dreams"	N. Schon; J. Cain; Tribble	5:29
11.	"Live and Breathe"	N. Schon; J. Cain; Augeri	5:15
12.	"Nothin' Comes Close"	N. Schon; J. Cain; Augeri	5:41
13.	"To Be Alive Again (Edit)"	J. Cain; Augeri; Tribble; Eric Bazilian	4:22
14.	"Kiss Me Softly"	Blades; N. Schon; Augeri	4:48
15.	"We Will Meet Again"	N. Schon; Augeri; Tribble	5:06

Japanese edition
No.	Title	Writer(s)	Length
1.	"Higher Place"	Blades; N. Schon	5:10
2.	"All the Way"	N. Schon; J. Cain; Rhodes; Augeri	3:35
3.	"Signs of Life"	N. Schon; J. Cain; E. Cain	4:54
4.	"All the Things"	N. Schon; J. Cain; Pessis	4:24
5.	"Loved by You"	J. Cain; Hyler; Tribble	4:03
6.	"Livin' to Do"	N. Schon; M. Schon; Cain; Tribble	6:25
7.	"I Got a Reason"	Blades; N. Schon; J. Cain	4:20
8.	"With Your Love"	N. Schon; J. Cain; E. Cain	4:25
9.	"Lifetime of Dreams"	N. Schon; J. Cain; Tribble	5:29
10.	"Live and Breathe"	N. Schon; J. Cain; Augeri	5:15
11.	"Kiss Me Softly"	Blades; N. Schon; Augeri	4:48
12.	"I'm Not That Way"	N. Schon; J. Cain; Augeri; Tribble	4:23
13.	"We Will Meet Again"	N. Schon; Augeri; Tribble	5:06
14.	"To Be Alive Again"	J. Cain; Augeri; Tribble; Bazilian	4:48

== Personnel ==
Journey

- Steve Augeri – lead vocals
- Neal Schon – guitar, backing vocals
- Jonathan Cain – keyboards, backing vocals, string arrangements
- Ross Valory – bass, backing vocals
- Deen Castronovo – drums, backing vocals

Production and design

- Kevin Shirley – producer, engineer, mixing
- Aya Takemura – engineer
- George Marino – mastering
- John Kalodner – A&R

== Charts ==
Chart (2000–2001)	Peak position
German Albums (Offizielle Top 100)	62
Japanese Albums (Oricon)	19
US Billboard 200	56
