= Who's Crying Now =

Single by Journey

Single by Journey

from the album Escape
- B-side: "Mother, Father"
- Released: July 9, 1981 (US)
- Recorded: 1981
- Genre: Soft rock
- Length: 4:24 (single version); 5:01 (album version)
- Label: Columbia
- Songwriters: Jonathan Cain; Steve Perry
- Producers: Kevin Elson; Mike Stone

Journey singles chronology
"The Party's Over (Hopelessly in Love)" (1981)	"Who's Crying Now" (1981)	"Don't Stop Believin'" (1981)

"Who's Crying Now" is a song by the American rock band Journey. It was written by Jonathan Cain and Steve Perry. It was released in 1981 as the first single from Escape and reached No. 4 on both the Billboard Hot 100 and the Mainstream Rock Tracks charts. The song charted at No. 46 in the UK Singles Chart, and was the band's highest-charting single in the UK until "Don't Stop Believin'" (also released as a single from the Escape album in 1981) incurred a resurgence in UK popularity in 2009.

The song is highlighted by Steve Perry's lyrics (with vocal riffs highly reminiscent of Sam Cooke) and piano playing by Jonathan Cain which segues into a bass riff by Ross Valory, and other guitars.

== Background ==
Singer Steve Perry said the chorus popped into his head while driving to Los Angeles, which he recorded on his personal mini cassette player. Once he arrived in LA, he went straight to keyboardist Jonathan Cain's house to show him the work in progress. Perry had come up with most of the melodies and rhythms, but was stumped on the lyrics. Cain helped write most of the verses.

At the end of the song, Neal Schon plays a repeating guitar solo that sounds similar to Santana. According to Schon on In the Studio with Redbeard (which devoted an entire episode to the making of Escape), originally he recorded an aggressive, experimental guitar solo which he liked but Perry and Cain did not. He then recorded a second solo, the "simplest thing he could play off the top of his head" as recalled by Perry. That one was appreciated much more by the rest of the band. Steve Smith's drumming is only found in the choruses and towards the end of the song.

== Reception ==
Billboard praised "Who's Crying Now" as "one of Journey's strongest and classiest records," and "one of the most appealing love songs" of 1981. Record World said the song spotlights "haunting vocals" and "icy keyboards."

== Cover version(s) ==
"Who's Crying Now"

Single by Randy Crawford

from the album Through the Eyes of Love
- Released: 1992
- Genre: R&B
- Length: 4:31
- Label: Warner Bros.
- Songwriters: Jonathan Cain; Steve Perry
- Producer: Michael J. Powell

Randy Crawford singles chronology
"Diamante" (1991)	"Who's Crying Now" (1992)	"Ryhthm of Romance" (1992)

R&B singer Randy Crawford recorded a soulful version on her 1992 album Through the Eyes of Love. Her cover of this song also features jazz pianist Joe Sample of The Crusaders.

Dance/remix group Karmadelic produced a 2001 cover of Who's Crying Now, featuring Pete Cintorino on vocals.

== Charts ==
=== Weekly charts ===
Chart (1981)	Peak position
Australian Kent Music Report	65
Canadian RPM Adult Contemporary Singles	1
Canadian RPM Top Singles	3
Radio Luxemburg Singles	29
UK Singles (Official Charts)	46
US Billboard Hot 100	4
US Billboard Adult Contemporary	14
US Billboard Top Rock Tracks	4
US Cashbox Top 100	3

=== Year-end charts ===
Chart (1981)	Position
Canadian RPM Top Singles	40
US Top Pop Singles (Billboard)	56
US Cashbox Top 100	26

== Certifications ==
Region	Certification	Certified units/sales
United States (RIAA)	2× Platinum	2,000,000^{‡}
^{‡} Sales+streaming figures based on certification alone.
