= Journey (band) =

American rock band

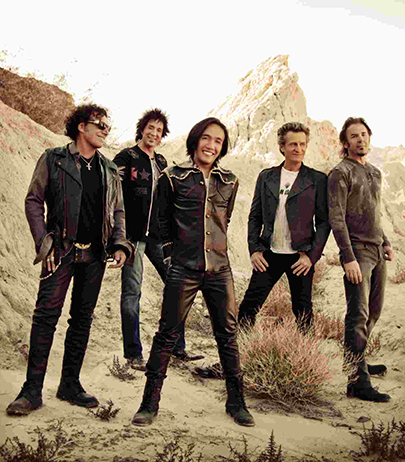
- Journey in 2013 from left to right: Neal Schon, Deen Castronovo, Arnel Pineda, Ross Valory, Jonathan Cain

Background information
- Also known as: Golden Gate Rhythm Section
- Origin: San Francisco, California, U.S.
- Genres: Arena rock; hard rock; soft rock; progressive rock (early); jazz rock (early)
- Works: Discography
- Years active: 1973–1987; 1995–present
- Labels: Columbia; Frontiers; Sanctuary; Nomota; BMG
- Spinoffs: Bad English; The Storm; Planet Us; Soul SirkUS
- Spinoff of: Santana
- Members: Neal Schon; Jonathan Cain; Deen Castronovo; Arnel Pineda; Jason Derlatka; Todd Jensen
- Past members: Gregg Rolie; Ross Valory; George Tickner; Prairie Prince; Aynsley Dunbar; Robert Fleischman; Steve Perry; Steve Smith; Randy Jackson; Steve Augeri; Jeff Scott Soto; Narada Michael Walden
- Website: journeymusic.com

Journey is an American rock band formed in San Francisco in 1973 by former members of Santana, the Steve Miller Band, and Frumious Bandersnatch. The band as of 2026 consists of Neal Schon on guitars and vocals; Jonathan Cain on keyboards, guitars and vocals; Deen Castronovo on drums and vocals; Arnel Pineda on lead vocals; Jason Derlatka on keyboards and vocals; and Todd Jensen on bass and vocals.

Journey had their biggest commercial success between 1978 and 1987, when Steve Perry was lead vocalist; they released a series of hit songs, including "Don't Stop Believin'" (1981). In 2024, the track was certified 18-times platinum by the RIAA, surpassing all previous records to become the top-selling digital track in US history. Escape, Journey's seventh and most successful album, reached number one on the Billboard 200 and yielded another of their most popular singles, "Open Arms". The 1983 follow-up album, Frontiers, was almost as successful in the United States, reaching number two and spawning several successful singles; it broadened the band's appeal in the United Kingdom, where it reached number six on the UK Albums Chart. Journey enjoyed a successful reunion in the mid-1990s with the album Trial by Fire (1996), and have since regrouped twice; first with Steve Augeri from 1998 to 2006, then with Arnel Pineda from 2007 onward.

Sales have resulted in 25 gold and platinum albums, in addition to the 18-time platinum RIAA Diamond Certified, 1988's Greatest Hits album. They have had 19 top-40 singles in the US, six of which reached the top 10 of the US chart and two of which reached number one on other Billboard charts, and a number-six hit on the UK Singles Chart in "Don't Stop Believin'". Originally a progressive rock band, Journey was described by AllMusic as having cemented a reputation as "one of America's most beloved (and sometimes hated) commercial rock/pop bands" by 1978, when they redefined their sound by embracing pop arrangements on their fourth album, Infinity.

== History ==
=== 1973–1977: Formation, Journey, Look into the Future and Next ===
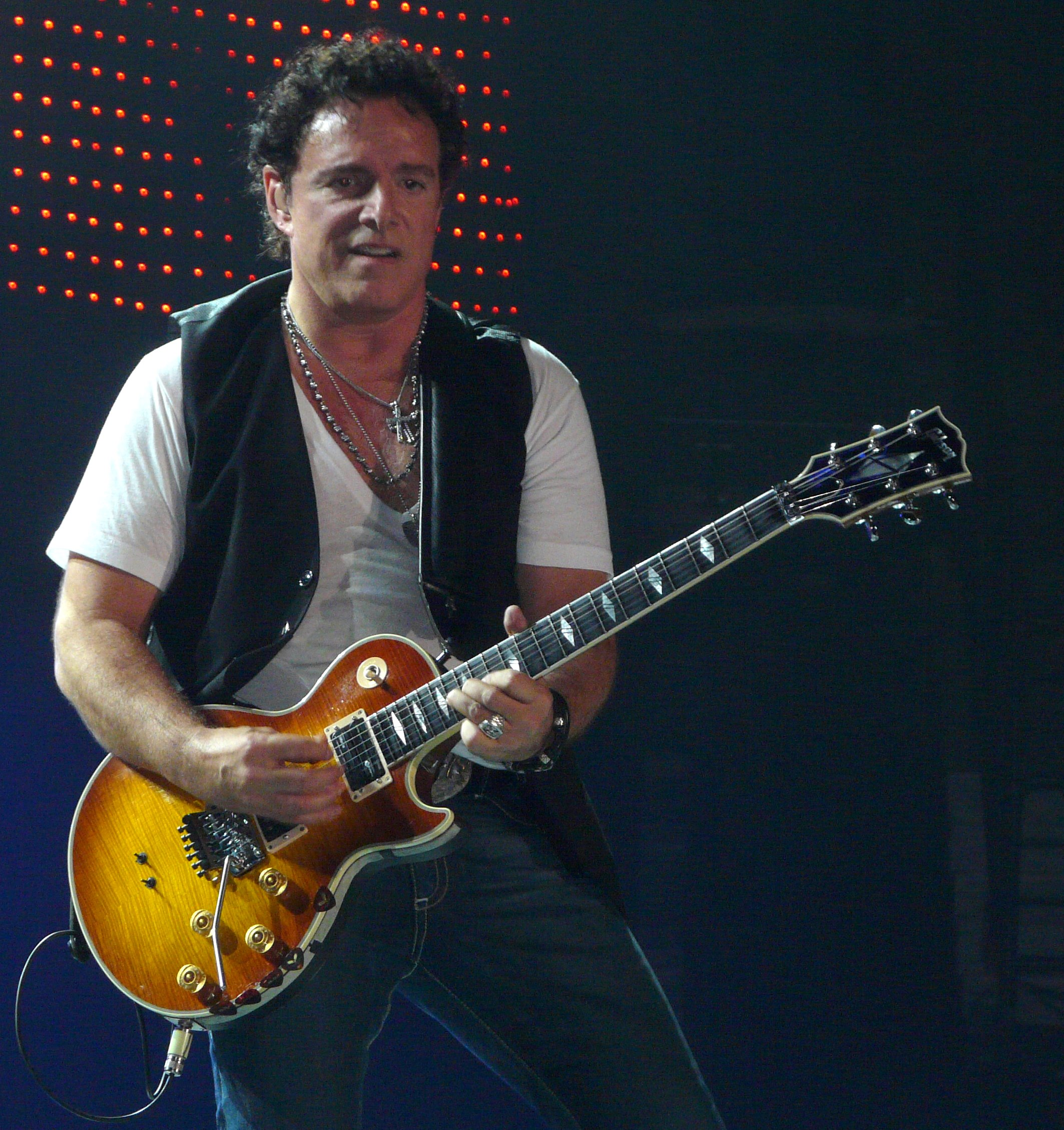
Neal Schon, the remaining original member of Journey in 2008.

The original members of Journey came together in San Francisco in 1973 under the auspices of former Santana manager Herbie Herbert. Originally called the Golden Gate Rhythm Section and intended to serve as a backup group for established Bay Area artists, the band included Santana alumni Neal Schon on lead guitar and Gregg Rolie on keyboards and lead vocals. Bassist Ross Valory, formerly of both Frumious Bandersnatch and the Steve Miller Band, as well as rhythm guitarist George Tickner of Frumious Bandersnatch rounded out the group. Prairie Prince of The Tubes served as drummer. After one performance in Hawaii, the band quickly abandoned the "backup group" concept and developed a distinctive jazz fusion style. After an unsuccessful radio contest to name the group, roadie John Villanueva suggested the name "Journey".

The band's first public appearance came at the Winterland Ballroom on New Year's Eve 1973 to an audience of 10,000. On the following day, the band flew to Hawaii to perform at the Diamond Head Crater to an audience over 100,000 strong. Prairie Prince rejoined The Tubes shortly thereafter; on February 1, 1974, after auditioning up to 28 drummers, the band hired British drummer Aynsley Dunbar, who had recently worked with David Bowie and had been a member of the second iteration of Frank Zappa's Mothers of Invention. The new line-up made its debut on February 5, 1974, at the Great American Music Hall in front of Columbia Records executives, and secured a recording contract with the label. The band went on to perform at venues around the Bay Area.

Journey went into CBS Studios in November 1974 with producer Roy Halee to record its debut album, Journey. The album was released in April 1975, entering the Billboard charts at number 138. Rhythm guitarist Tickner left the band (and the music business to study medicine) due to the amount of heavy touring the band was doing in promoting the album, allowing Schon to take on full guitar duties. The band entered the studio again in late 1975 to record Look into the Future, which was released in January 1976 and entered the Billboard Top 200 charts at number 100. The band promoted the album with a two-hour performance at the Paramount Theatre in Seattle, which later aired on the radio as touring continued to promote the album.

From May to October 1976, the band went to His Master's Wheels Studios to record its third studio album, Next, which—like its predecessor—was produced by the band. This album had a much more commercial sound, while keeping the band's jazz fusion and progressive rock roots intact. The album was released in February and charted on the Billboard Top 200 at number 85. However, sales did not improve, and Columbia Records was on the verge of dropping the band.

=== 1977–1980: New musical direction, Infinity, Evolution, and Departure ===
I still think some of the stuff we did then was great. Some of it was self-indulgent, just jamming for ourselves, but I also think a lot of other things hurt us in the early days. It took a while for the politics to sort of shape up.
— Neal Schon

As Journey's album sales did not improve, Columbia Records requested that they change their musical style and add a frontman who would share lead vocals with Rolie. The band hired Robert Fleischman in May 1977 and made the transition to a more popular style, akin to that of Foreigner and Boston. Journey went on tour with Fleischman from May through August 1977, opening for bands such as Black Sabbath, Target, Judas Priest, and Emerson, Lake & Palmer. Fleischman and the rest of the band began writing and rehearsing new songs, including the soon-to-be-popular track "Wheel in the Sky". During a performance before about 100,000 at Soldier Field in Chicago, the band was introduced to Steve Perry. Differences between Fleischman and manager Herbie Herbert resulted in Fleischman's departure from the band in September of that year.

Steve Perry, the former lead vocalist of Journey

Journey hired Steve Perry as their new lead singer on October 10, 1977. Perry made his live debut with the band at the Old Waldorf on October 28, 1977, stepping into His Master's Studios and Cherokee Studios from October to December. Herbie Herbert, the band's manager, hired Roy Thomas Baker as producer to add a layered sound approach similar to that of Baker's previously produced band, Queen. With their new lead singer and new producer, the band's fourth studio album, Infinity, released in January 1978, peaked at number 21 on the US Billboard 200. The band embarked on a tour in support of the album, when they performed as headliners of a full tour for the first time, beginning with their topping a bill that included Van Halen and Ronnie Montrose.

According to the band's manager Herbie Herbert, tensions arose between a discontented Aynsley Dunbar and the band due to his displeasure with the change in musical direction from the jazz fusion sound. Neal Schon reflected on the tensions: "We would talk about it, and he'd say he'd be willing to simplify things, but we'd get out there, and after five shows, he wasn't doing that at all." Dunbar started playing erratically and talking derogatorily about the other members, which eventually resulted in Herbert firing Dunbar shortly after the Infinity Tour ended with the Day on the Green 1978 concert at Oakland-Alameda County Coliseum on September 2. Dunbar was replaced by Berklee-trained and ex-Montrose drummer Steve Smith.

Perry, Schon, Rolie, Smith, and Valory entered Cherokee Studios in late 1978 to record their fifth studio album, Evolution, which was released in March 1979, peaking at number 20 on the Billboard 200. The album, which was a milestone for the band, gave the band their first Billboard Hot 100 Top-20 single, "Lovin', Touchin', Squeezin'", peaking at number 16, which gave the band significant airplay. Following the tour in support of Evolution, the band expanded its operation to include a lighting and trucking operation for their future performances, as the tour had grossed more than $5 million, making the band as popular as it had ever been in five years. The band later entered Automatt Studios to record their sixth studio album, Departure, which was released in March 1980, peaking at number eight on the Billboard 200. The first single from the album, "Any Way You Want It", peaked at number 23 on the Billboard Hot 100 in 1980.

Keyboardist Gregg Rolie left the band following the Departure tour to start a family and undertake various solo projects. It was the second time in his career he had departed from a successful act. Keyboardist Stevie "Keys" Roseman was brought in to record the lone studio track, "The Party's Over (Hopelessly in Love)", on the band's live album Captured. Rolie suggested pianist Jonathan Cain of The Babys as his permanent replacement. With Cain's synthesizers replacing Rolie's organ, Cain had become the new member of the band.

=== 1981–1983: Height of popularity, Escape and Frontiers ===
With Cain joining as the new keyboard player, the band entered Fantasy Studios in Berkeley, California, in late 1980, releasing their seventh studio album, Escape, in July 1981. Escape became their most successful album, charting at number one in the United States. The album had a clutch of hit singles, which included "Who's Crying Now", "Still They Ride", "Open Arms", and "Don't Stop Believin'".

The band began another lengthy yet successful tour on June 12, 1981, supported by opening acts Billy Squier, Greg Kihn Band, Point Blank, and Loverboy, and Journey opened for the Rolling Stones on September 25 in Philadelphia at JFK Stadium. MTV videotaped one of their two sold-out shows at The Summit in Houston on November 6, 1981, in front of over 20,000 fans, later released on DVD.

Following the success of the 1981 tour, the band's full establishment as a corporation, and the formation of a fan club called "Journey Force", the band released "Only Solutions" and "1990s Theme" for the 1982 Disney film, Tron. Schon had also made time to work with Jan Hammer on a few albums. Journey continued touring in 1982 with shows in North America and Japan.

With millions of records, hit singles, and tickets sold, the band entered Fantasy Studios again in the middle of their 1982 tour to record their eighth studio album, Frontiers. Released in February 1983, the band's second-best selling album sold over six million copies, peaking at number two on the Billboard charts, and spawning the hit singles "Separate Ways (Worlds Apart)", "Faithfully", "Send Her My Love", and "After the Fall".

Journey began the Frontiers tour in Japan, and continued in North America with Bryan Adams as opening act. During the tour, NFL Films recorded a video documentary of their life on the road, Frontiers and Beyond, shooting scenes at JFK Stadium in Philadelphia, Pennsylvania, with more than 80,000 fans in attendance.

=== 1984–1987: Raised on Radio and more personnel changes ===
After the Frontiers tour, the band took some time off. Lead singer Steve Perry and guitarist Neal Schon both pursued solo projects. In 1984, Perry, with the help of Herbie Herbert, recorded and released his first solo album, Street Talk. Neal Schon toured briefly in 1984 with his supergroup HSAS, in support of their sole album, Through the Fire released that year on Geffen.

When asked if Journey was over because of the selling of their properties at the end of 1984, Neal Schon commented, "No way Journey's ending. We're all too committed to this band to ever let that happen. In fact, one of the reasons we decided to go off in separate directions for a while was to keep the band as strong as ever."

Following a phone call between Cain and Perry, Journey returned to Fantasy Studios in late 1985 to record their ninth studio album, Raised on Radio, but with Perry taking the role as the album's producer. Tensions within the band were shown when Herbert and Perry fired both bass player Ross Valory and drummer Steve Smith for musical and professional differences a few months into the recording sessions for the album, though Valory later admitted he left the band on his own accord. Bassist and future American Idol judge Randy Jackson, bassist Bob Glaub, and established drummer Larrie Londin were brought in to continue the album's recordings. Raised on Radio was released in May 1986, peaking at number four on Billboard's album chart, but underperforming compared to the band's previous two efforts. It featured five singles: The top-10 hit "Be Good to Yourself" along with "Suzanne", "Girl Can't Help It", "I'll Be Alright Without You", and "Why Can't This Night Go On Forever?".

The Raised on Radio tour began at Angels Camp in August 1986 and the band performed sold-out shows throughout the United States before concluding with two shows in Anchorage in early 1987, with selected dates supported by Honeymoon Suite, The Outfield, and Glass Tiger. The tour featured both Randy Jackson on bass and Mike Baird on drums, and was videotaped by MTV for a documentary that included interviews with the band members, which was called Raised on Radio, the same as the album title.

With tensions between Perry, the band, and the band's manager Herbie Herbert at an all-time high following the tour's conclusion, Perry was unable or unwilling to remain actively involved, and was tired of touring, as it was affecting his health and his vocals. Herbert had booked fifteen more shows for the tour, but Perry had declined, and told Schon and Cain that he was done with Journey.

I called Jon and Neal together. We met in San Rafael, we sat on the edge of the marina, and I just told them, 'I can't do this anymore. I've got to get out for a while.' And they said: 'Well, what do you mean?' And I said: 'That's exactly what I mean, is what I'm saying. I just don't want to be in the band any more. I want to get out, I want to stop.' And I think Jon said: 'Well, just take some time off, and we'll think,' and I said: 'OK, fine.' And I just sort of fell back into my life. I looked around and realized that my whole life had become everything I'd worked so hard to be, and when I came back to have a regular life, I had to go find one.
— Steve Perry

=== 1987–1995: Hiatus ===
The band went into a hiatus in 1987 following the conclusion of their Raised on Radio tour. Columbia Records released the Greatest Hits compilation in November 1988, which became one of the best-selling greatest-hits albums, selling over 15 million copies and continuing to sell half a million to a million copies per year. The compilation spent 750 weeks on the Billboard album charts until 2008.

While Perry had retreated from the public eye, Schon and Cain spent the rest of 1987 collaborating with artists such as Jimmy Barnes and Michael Bolton before teaming up with Cain's ex-Babys bandmates John Waite and Ricky Phillips to form the supergroup Bad English with drummer Deen Castronovo in 1988, releasing two albums in 1989 and 1991. Steve Smith devoted his time to his jazz bands, Vital Information and Steps Ahead, and teamed up with Ross Valory and original Journey keyboardist Gregg Rolie to create The Storm with singer Kevin Chalfant and guitarist Josh Ramos, along with Herbie Herbert as the band's manager, as he did with Journey with Scott Boorey.

On November 3, 1991, Schon, Cain, and Perry reunited to perform "Faithfully" and "Lights" at the Bill Graham tribute concert Laughter, Love & Music at Golden Gate Park, following the concert promoter's death in a helicopter accident. In October 1993, Schon, Rolie, Valory, Dunbar, Smith, and Cain reunited and performed at a private dinner for their manager Herbie Herbert at Bimbo's in San Francisco, with Kevin Chalfant on lead vocals.

After the breakup of Bad English in 1991, Schon and Castronovo formed the glam metal band Hardline with brothers Johnny and Joey Gioeli, releasing only one studio album before his departure. Neal later joined Paul Rodgers in 1993 for live performances, alongside Deen Castronovo. In 1994, Steve Perry had released his second solo album For the Love of Strange Medicine, and toured North America in support of the album, though his voice had changed since the last time he had performed.

=== 1995–1997: Reunion and Trial by Fire ===
Perry made the decision to reunite with Journey under the condition that Herbie Herbert would no longer be the band's manager. The band hired Irving Azoff, longtime Eagles manager, as its new manager in October 1995. Steve Smith and Ross Valory reunited with Journey and the band started writing material for their next album, with rehearsals beginning that same month.

The band began recording their 10th studio album, Trial by Fire, in early 1996 at The Site and Wildhorse Studio in Marin County and Ocean Way Recorders, in which they recorded under producer Kevin Shirley. It was released in late October that year, peaking at number three on the Billboard album charts. The album's hit single "When You Love a Woman", which reached number 12 on the Billboard charts, was nominated in 1997 for a Grammy Award for Best Pop Performance by a Duo or Group with Vocal. The album also produced three top-40 mainstream rock tracks, "Message of Love" reaching number 18, "Can't Tame the Lion" reaching number 33, and "If He Should Break Your Heart" reaching number 38.

Plans for a subsequent tour ended when Perry, troubled by pain while hiking in Hawaii on a 10-day break in August 1996, discovered he had a degenerative bone condition and could not perform without hip-replacement surgery, which for some time he declined to undergo, later admitting he had other physical issues. The accident resulted in the album's release date being delayed.

The band took a break following the album's release to work on solo projects, waiting for Perry to make up his mind on if he wanted to tour. Schon released his solo album Electric World in 1997, later creating Abraxas Pool with former Journey member Gregg Rolie, drummer Michael Shrieve, and a few former Santana members. Cain released his two solo albums, Body Language and For A Lifetime in 1997 and 1998, respectively.

=== 1998–2007: Lead singer and drummer replaced, Arrival and Generations ===
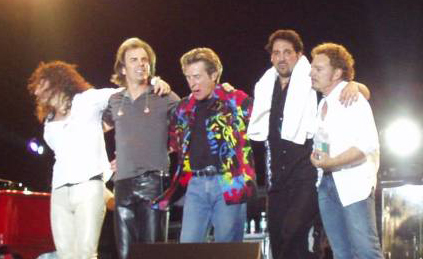
Journey in 2002: Steve Augeri, Jonathan Cain, Ross Valory, Deen Castronovo, and Neal Schon

Following the reunion album's release, the band was becoming restless waiting for an answer from Perry regarding touring. Following a phone call between Cain and Perry, the latter announced that he would be departing from Journey, releasing himself from the band's contracts and making the decision to semiretire from the music business, disappearing from the public eye again. Steve Smith later exited the band, citing that Journey would not be the same without Perry, and returning to his jazz career and his project Vital Information.

The band hired drummer Deen Castronovo, Schon's and Cain's Bad English bandmate and drummer for Hardline, to replace Steve Smith. After auditioning several high-profile candidates, including Geoff Tate, Kevin Chalfant, and John West, Journey replaced Perry with Steve Augeri, formerly of Tyketto and Tall Stories. Augeri's first song with the band was "Remember Me", featured on the soundtrack for the 1998 film Armageddon.

Following a rehearsal with Augeri and Castronovo, the band performed four gigs in Japan, a reliable touring stronghold for the band. When asked how he felt about touring for the first time in over a decade, Schon commented: "It's a little like we are reborn again." Journey embarked on a tour in the United States titled Vacation's Over, which began in October and concluded at the end of December in Reno. They continued the tour with another leg in 1999, beginning in Minnesota in June and concluding in Michigan in September.

From March to August 2000, the band entered Avatar Studios to record their next studio album, Arrival with producer Kevin Shirley. The album was released in Japan later in the year. A North American release of the album followed in April 2001, peaking at number 56 on the Billboard charts. The album's single "All the Way" failed to boost sales for the album which was considered a disappointment with mixed reviews and resulted in Sony dropping the band from their label. Upon the album's completion, the band embarked on a tour in support of the album in Latin America, the United States, and Europe.

During the events of September 11, 2001, in response to the attacks in New York City, the band joined various other bands at a major fundraising event to help the victims and families of the attack held on October 20 and 21 at the Smirnoff Music Centre in Dallas, Texas. The event raised about $1 million.

Activity for Journey was quiet in 2002, as Schon formed Planet Us with bandmate Castronovo, Sammy Hagar and former Van Halen bassist Michael Anthony until 2004, when Planet Us disbanded. Schon also co-wrote songs with the band Bad Company, while Cain released another solo album. Having made some recordings between 2001 and 2002, the band released a four-track EP titled Red 13 in November under their new label Journey Music, with an album cover design chosen through a fan contest with the online cover designed by Kelly McDonald, while the retail cover designed by Christopher Payne was only made available at the band's performances. The band only performed one club gig in support of the EP, but later began another tour of the United States from May to August in 2003, that included their teaming with Styx and REO Speedwagon in Classic Rock's Main Event. The band then toured the following year on the Summer Detour, which began from June and concluded in September 2004. In November, Journey reteamed with both REO Speedwagon and Styx for a tour around the Caribbean aboard the Triumph cruise ship.

In 2005, the members of Journey were inducted into the Hollywood Walk of Fame alongside former members Perry, Dunbar, Tickner, Steve Smith, and Fleischmann. Rolie was the only member who did not appear at the ceremony. Surprised to see Perry joining them to accept the induction with the band, Valory commented on the wonderful things Perry had to say in which he looked to be in fine shape, and that it was a pleasant surprise to see him.

Following their accolade on the Hollywood Walk of Fame, the band began recording at the Record Plant in Sausalito, California, for their 12th studio album, Generations, with producer Kevin Elson, who had previously collaborated with the band. The album was released on August 29 in Europe, with a North American release following on October 4. The album peaked at number 170 on the Billboard charts. To promote the album and celebrate the band's 30th anniversary, the band embarked on a tour starting in Irvine, California, in June and concluding in Phoenix in October. Each concert on the tour was three hours long with an intermission and featured many of their classic hits, as well as new songs from the album.

In 2006, the band toured in Europe and then joined Def Leppard in a North American tour. During the tours, however, suggestions arose that Augeri was not singing, but was using backing tracks to cover up his deteriorating vocals, resulting in him getting attacked by the fans. Augeri had been suffering from vocal attrition problems before the band began the tour with Def Leppard, and Journey had been accused of using prerecorded lead vocals, an accusation that former manager Herbie Herbert insists was true. Augeri admitted in a 2022 interview that he wasn't legally allowed to say whether it was true or not. In a press statement, the band later announced that Augeri had to step down as Journey's lead singer and leave the tour to recover. Augeri performed his last show with Journey on July 4 in Raleigh.

With the successful tour still going on, the band was quick to hire Jeff Scott Soto from Talisman as their lead vocalist. He performed as Journey's vocalist for the first time on July 7 in Bristow. Because of its success and popularity, the tour was extended to November. Soto was later officially announced as the band's new vocalist in December 2006. Following tours of Europe and the United States in 2007, the band announced on June 12 that Soto was no longer part of the group. In a statement, Schon stated: "He did a tremendous job for us and we wish him the best. We've just decided to go our separate ways, no pun intended. We're plotting our next move now."

=== 2007–2019: Lead singer replaced with Arnel Pineda, Revelation and Eclipse ===
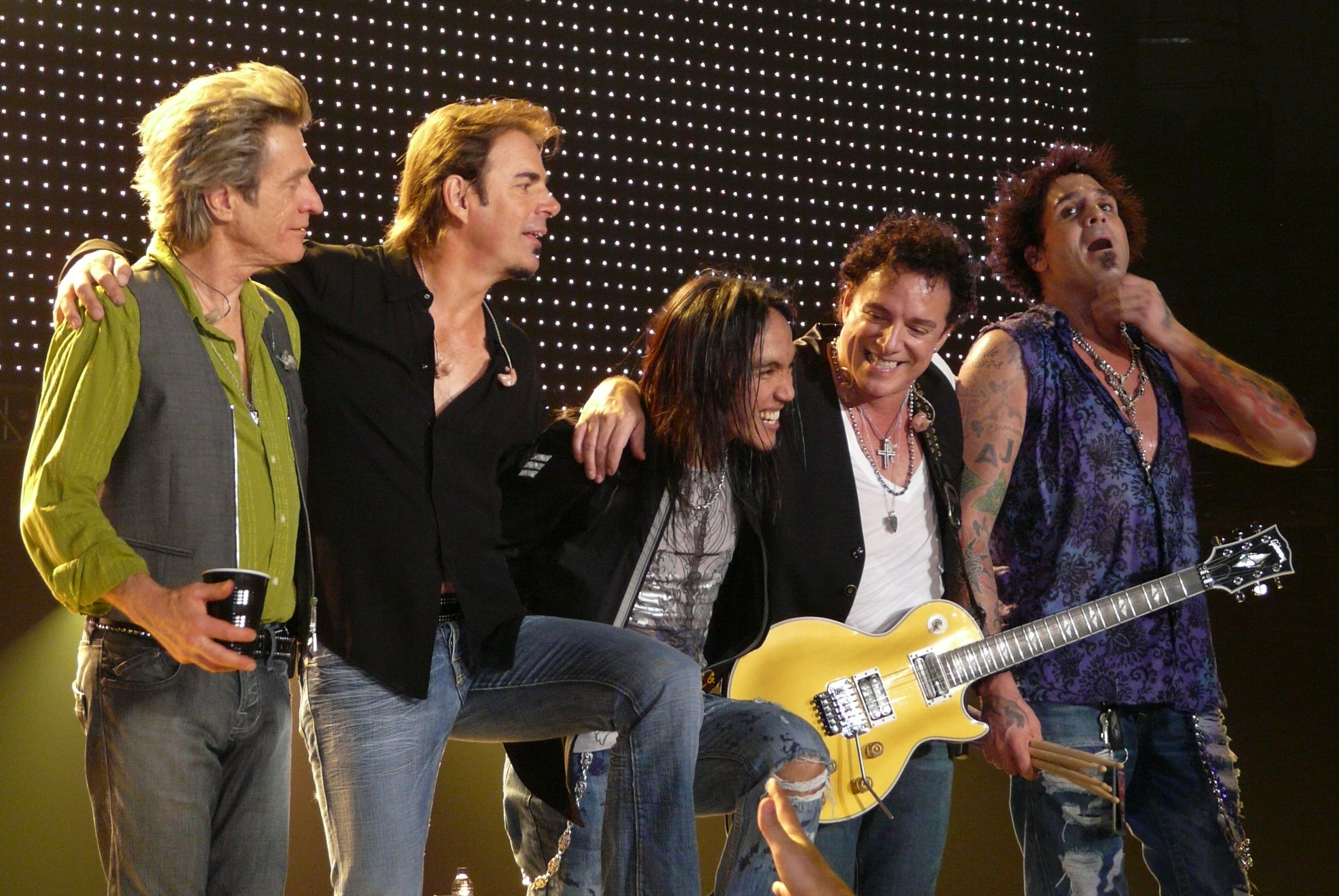
Journey in 2008: Valory, Cain, Pineda, Schon, and Castronovo

Following Soto's departure, the band was again without a lead vocalist. Neal Schon began searching YouTube for a new lead vocalist, with Jeremey Hunsicker of the Journey tribute band Frontiers auditioning and spending a week with the band writing material. Hunsicker claims to have been formally offered the position, but the offer fell through shortly afterwards following tension with Schon. One of the tracks co-written with Hunsicker, "Never Walk Away", later appeared on the Revelation album. Schon later found Filipino singer Arnel Pineda of the cover band The Zoo, covering the song "Faithfully". Schon was so impressed that he contacted Pineda to set up two days of auditions, which went well, naming him the official lead vocalist of Journey on December 5, 2007.

Although Pineda was neither the first non-American to become a member of Journey (former drummer Aynsley Dunbar is British), nor even the first nonwhite member (bass player Randy Jackson is African American), his recruitment resulted in some fans of Journey making racist comments towards the new vocalist. Keyboardist Jonathan Cain responded to such sentiments in the Marin Independent Journal: "We've become a world band. We're international now. We're not about one color."

In 2007, "Don't Stop Believin'" gained press coverage and a sharp growth in popularity when it was used in The Sopranos television series final episode prompting digital downloads of the song to soar.

In November 2007, Journey entered the studio with Pineda to record the studio album, Revelation. The album was released on June 3, 2008. It debuted at number five on the Billboard charts, selling more than 196,000 units in its first two weeks and staying in the top 20 for six weeks. As a multidisc set (2-CD) each unit within that set counts as one sale. Journey also found success on Billboard's Adult Contemporary chart where the single "After All These Years" spent over 23 weeks, peaking at number nine.

On February 21, 2008, Pineda performed for the first time with Journey in front of 20,000 fans in Chile. The band began the Revelation tour in the United Kingdom in June, continuing the tour into North America, Asia, Europe, and South America. The 2008 leg concluded in October. Receipts from the 2008 tour made Journey one of the top-grossing concert tours of the year, bringing in over $35,000,000. On December 18, 2008, Revelation was certified platinum by RIAA.

The band performed at the Super Bowl XLIII pregame show in Tampa on February 1, 2009. The band continued their Revelation tour in May and concluded it in October 2009. The band had also performed in Manila to 30,000 fans, which was recorded for a live release, Live in Manila.

In 2009, "Don't Stop Believin'" became the top-selling song on iTunes among those released before 2000.

The band entered into Fantasy Studios on 2010 with Pineda to record their studio album, Eclipse. The album was released on May 24, 2011, and debuted at number 13 on the Billboard 200 charts. The band toured the United Kingdom in June 2011 with Foreigner and Styx. Journey was awarded the prestigious "Legend of Live Award" at the Billboard Touring Awards in October. Greatest Hits 2 was released in November.

In June 2015, Deen Castronovo was arrested following a domestic altercation. He was fired by Journey in August and was ultimately replaced by Omar Hakim on the band's 2015 tour. In 2016, Steve Smith again returned as Journey's drummer, reuniting all of the members of the Escape-Frontiers-Trial by Fire lineup except lead singer Steve Perry. Their tour that year also featured Dave Mason and The Doobie Brothers.

In 2017, Journey was inducted into the Rock and Roll Hall of Fame. At the ceremony held on April 7 at the Barclays Center in New York City, Pat Monahan gave the introduction speech. The members included in the induction were all based from their debut album up to when they originally broke up, with the exception of George Tickner. Dunbar, Rolie, Valory, Schon, Perry, Smith and Cain all gave acceptance speeches. When it came time for the band to play, all but Perry performed, with Pineda taking his place.

In 2018, during the North American tour with Def Leppard, Journey topped the Billboard Hot Tours List by grossing more than $30 million over 17 shows.

=== 2020–2024: Contested lineup changes, lawsuits, and Freedom ===
On March 3, 2020, Schon and Cain announced that they had fired Smith and Valory and were suing them for an alleged "attempted corporate coup d'état," seeking damages in excess of $10 million. The lawsuit alleged Smith and Valory tried to "assume control of Nightmare Productions because they incorrectly believe that Nightmare Productions controls the Journey name and mark" to "hold the Journey name hostage and set themselves up with a guaranteed income stream after they stop performing." Valory and Smith contested the firings, with the support of Perry and former manager Herbie Herbert. Court filings revealed that Perry had been paid as a member of the band for years despite not performing. In an open letter dated that same day, Schon and Cain stated Smith and Valory "are no longer members of Journey, and that Schon and Cain have lost confidence in both of them and are not willing to perform with them again." Valory countersued Schon and Cain, among other things, for their partnership's claim of owning the Journey trademark and service mark (collectively known as the mark), when that partnership, Elmo Partners, was only the licensee of the mark from 1985 to 1994, when the license was terminated by Herbie Herbert of Nightmare Productions, owners of the mark and name. Valory also sought protection against Schon from using any similarities of the Journey mark and name for his side project, Neal Schon – Journey Through Time. On April 1, 2021, it was announced that an amicable settlement had been reached between Schon/Cain and Valory/Smith. In May, Schon and Cain announced that bassist Randy Jackson would once again join the band, replacing Valory, and drummer Narada Michael Walden was announced as an official new member of Journey, replacing Smith.

In June 2020, Schon announced via his social-media page that a new album with Jackson and Walden was "starting to take shape". The following month, he confirmed the album's progress, and confirmed that they would be releasing new music in early 2021. In January 2021, he announced that the first single of the album would be released later that year, with possibly a worldwide tour to follow. The single "The Way We Used to Be" was released on June 24, 2021.

In July 2021, Schon confirmed that Deen Castronovo, who was previously in the band, had rejoined as a second drummer. Meanwhile, Jackson's back surgery led to the band bringing in Marco Mendoza to play bass, with Mendoza having previously played with Schon and Castronovo in Neal Schon's Journey Through Time. Mendoza's stint with Journey, though, only lasted a few months due to Schon's feeling that his bass playing did not gel with the band's sound, and he was replaced by Todd Jensen, who had previously played with Schon and Castronovo in Hardline.

On February 16, 2022, the band announced the title and track listing of their 15th studio album Freedom, which was released on July 8, 2022. The second single from the album, "You Got the Best of Me", was released on April 26, 2022; the third, "Let It Rain", on May 17; the fourth, "Don't Give Up on Us", on June 7; and the fifth, "United We Stand", on July 4.

On March 1, 2022, Cain confirmed that neither Walden nor Jackson remained in the lineup, with Walden's exit following a minor heart attack following a live show in Pennsylvania. Nevertheless, both were still featured on Freedom, as they had completed their parts on the album before their departures. Schon later stated that Walden and Jackson were still "musical members" of the band, and he would certainly write again with Walden in the future. Schon also did not rule out the possibility of former members Perry and Rolie returning for a reunion on the band's 50th anniversary. Although Schon had confirmed that former member Rolie would appear with the band for their tour in January 2023, he later backtracked, stating that Rolie would not be joining for the 50th anniversary tour, although he would later make a guest appearance for the band's performance in Austin on February 22, 2023.

Perry filed a lawsuit against Schon and Cain regarding song trademark registrations on September 21, 2022, although he would drop the lawsuit on January 7, 2023. Two months later, Schon filed a lawsuit against Cain over a credit card dispute.

On October 27, 2022, Journey announced its fifth live album, Live in Concert at Lollapalooza, which was released on December 9, 2022.

In December 2022, Schon served Cain with a cease and desist order after he performed "Don't Stop Believin'" for Donald Trump, stating Cain "has no right to use Journey for politics". Throughout 2023 to early 2024, the band toured with Toto. Journey toured North America again with Def Leppard throughout July to September 2024, as they previously did in 2006 and 2018. Cain opened up another lawsuit against Schon in July 2024, in which Schon was accused of misusing the band's credit cards, which resulted in a UK and Ireland tour being cancelled.

On September 22, 2024, Pineda took to Facebook to respond to criticism following the band's performance at Rock in Rio, where he struggled with his ear monitors on stage. He offered to leave the band if one million fans commented "Go" on his post.

=== 2025–present: Farewell tour ===
On October 10, 2025, it was announced that Cain would be departing from the band after a final tour, with Schon stating that Journey would continue without Cain. A month later, the band announced the North American leg of their farewell tour, dubbed the Final Frontier Tour on November 6, 2025, which began in February 2026.

== Musical style and influences ==
AllMusic has Journey tagged as arena rock and hard rock. Their recorded catalog contains both anthems and sentimental ballads. The band's music makes strong use of melody and hooks, and vocalist Steve Perry sings in the tenor range.

Keyboardist-guitarist Jonathan Cain opined that the band's style was "a blend of all of the American styles of popular music" such as blues, rock, soul, and pop. He called it "sort of a gumbo of American music" and "a hybrid of the radio of the '60s." He explained: "It's funny because the '60s stations played all of that on one station. So you had these stations like in Chicago, WCFL, WLS, where you would hear soul, rock, and blues all in one hour." He further stated that when he first joined the band, him and Perry established with one another that they did not have a preference for one particular style or genre. The band's early influences included Motown, The Who, Deep Purple, Al Green, Tina Turner, The Lettermen, The Vogues, Johnny Cash and Rosemary Clooney. Speaking of the band's diverse influences, he said: "I think we dabbled, more so than The Beatles, but they were actually dabbling too."

== Band members ==
Current

- Neal Schon – lead guitar, backing vocals (1973–1987, 1991, 1995–present)
- Jonathan Cain – keyboards, backing vocals, rhythm guitar, harmonica (1980–1987, 1991, 1995–present)
- Deen Castronovo – drums, backing and lead vocals (1998–2015, 2021–present; not touring 2026–present)
- Arnel Pineda – lead vocals (2007–present)
- Jason Derlatka – keyboards, backing and lead vocals (2020–present)
- Todd Jensen – bass, backing vocals (2021–present)

== In popular culture ==
On March 8, 2013, a documentary, Don't Stop Believin': Everyman's Journey, was released. The movie, directed by Ramona S. Diaz, chronicles the discovery of Arnel Pineda and his first year with Journey.

During the COVID-19 pandemic, "Don't Stop Believin'" was used as an anthem for patients who were being discharged from New York Presbyterian Queens Hospital and Henry Ford Health System after defeating the virus. On August 21, 2021, Journey played the song live at New York's "We Love NYC: The Homecoming Concert", which was scheduled to celebrate the city's emergence from the pandemic.

== Discography ==
=== Studio albums ===
- Journey (1975)
- Look into the Future (1976)
- Next (1977)
- Infinity (1978)
- Evolution (1979)
- Departure (1980)
- Dream, After Dream (1980)
- Escape (1981)
- Frontiers (1983)
- Raised on Radio (1986)
- Trial by Fire (1996)
- Arrival (2000)
- Generations (2005)
- Revelation (2008)
- Eclipse (2011)
- Freedom (2022)

== See also ==
- Best-selling music artists
- List of bands from the San Francisco Bay Area
