= Ross Valory =

American bassist (born 1949)

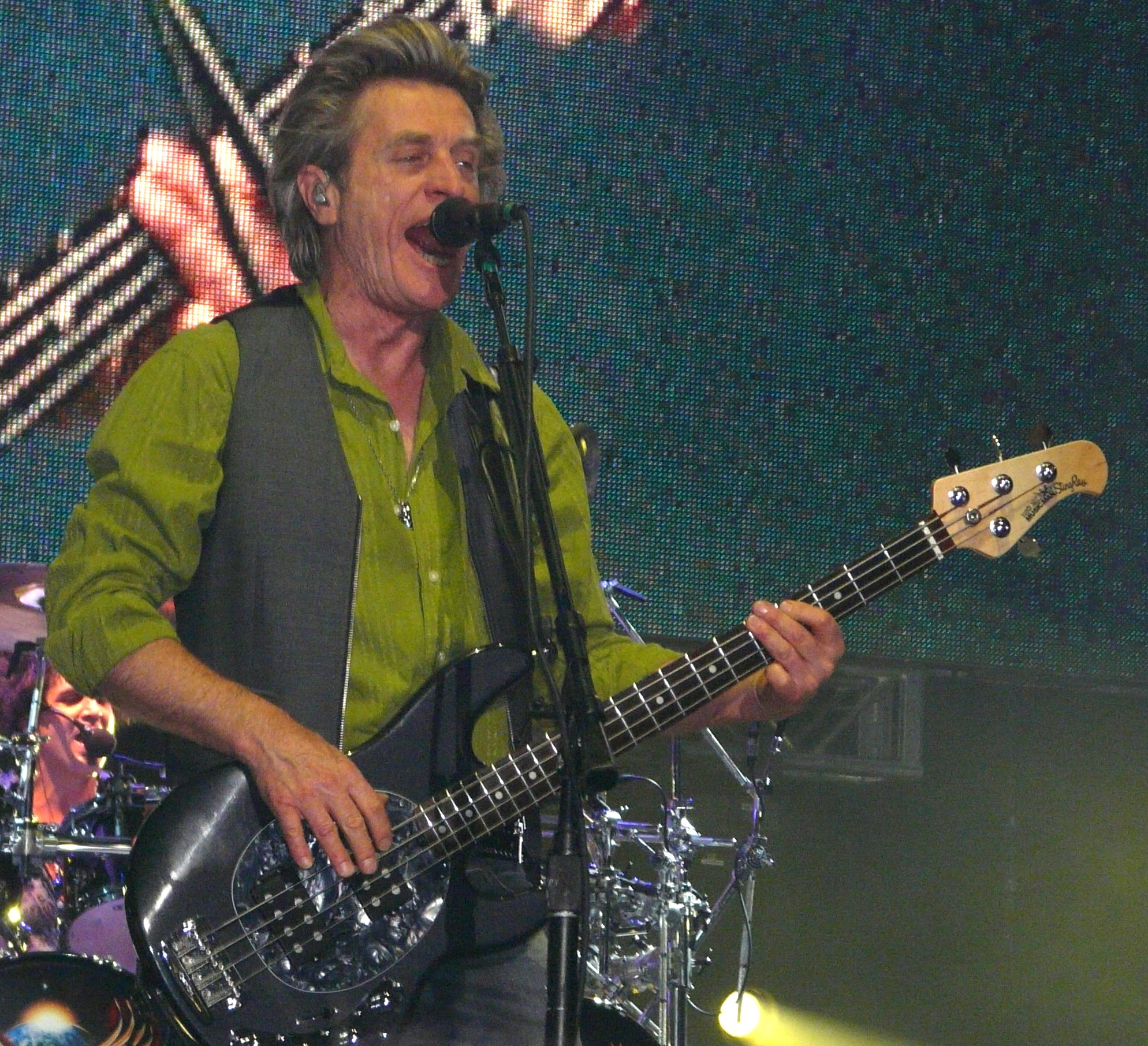
- Valory performing in Minneapolis, Minnesota, September 2008

Background information
- Born: Ross Lamont Valory; February 2, 1949 (age 77); San Francisco, California, U.S.
- Genres: Rock
- Occupation: Musician
- Instruments: Bass guitar, vocals
- Years active: 1966–present
- Labels: Columbia Records, Sony Records, Frontiers, Oid Music
- Formerly of: Frumious Bandersnatch, Steve Miller Band, Journey, The VU, The Storm, Todd Rundgren, Sy Klopps Blues Band

Ross Lamont Valory (born February 2, 1949) is an American musician who is best known as a founding member of the rock band Journey. He was the bassist for the band from 1973 to 1985 and again from 1995 to 2020. Valory was inducted into the Rock and Roll Hall of Fame in Cleveland, Ohio as a member of Journey in 2017.

== Early life ==
Ross Valory was born on February 2, 1949, in San Francisco. He attended Acalanes High School in Lafayette, California. In high school, he played clarinet, bass clarinet, and guitar. His mother introduced him to jazz, particularly Dave Brubeck's music.

== Career ==
Valory began his career playing with the band Frumious Bandersnatch before joining the Steve Miller Band in the early 1970s. He released an album with the group. In 1973, Valory and fellow Frumious Bandersnatch member George Tickner joined with Neal Schon, Santana’s Prairie Prince, and Gregg Rolie to form Journey.

Through 2011, Valory played on all of Journey's albums, except 1986's Raised on Radio. In 1985, Valory and drummer Steve Smith were dismissed from Journey. After Journey went on hiatus in 1987, Valory, Rolie, and Smith started The Storm, a band. They released the album Storm in September 1991, and in March 1992 went on a national tour with Bryan Adams.

Valory rejoined Journey in 1996 when the band reunited for the album Trial by Fire. He was nominated for a 1997 Grammy award as a member of Journey for the song "When You Love a Woman". In 2017, Valory was inducted into the Rock and Roll Hall of Fame as a member of Journey. In 2020, Valory and Smith were fired from Journey for a second time, amid a lawsuit alleging they attempted to take control of the band’s name. Valory filed a countersuit against the band and the case was settled amicably in 2021.

Valory uses what is commonly referred to as Nashville tuning by stringing his bass B-E-A-D, rather than the more traditional arrangement of E-A-D-G; this tuning allowed the depth of a five-string bass while retaining the playability of a four-string. He has also been a member of the band The VU, which released the 2000 album Phoenix Rising, and has performed with The Sy Klopps Blues Band. On January 17, 2024, Valory announced his forthcoming debut solo album All Of The Above and released a video for its first single "Tomland", featuring Prairie Prince on drums and Miles Schon (son of Journey's Neal Schon) on guitar.

== Discography ==
=== Solo ===
- All of the Above (2024)

=== Steve Miller Band ===
- Rock Love (1971)

=== Journey ===
- Journey (1975)
- Look into the Future (1976)
- Next (1977)
- Infinity (1978)
- Evolution (1979)
- Departure (1980)
- Dream, After Dream (1980)
- Captured (1981)
- Escape (1981)
- Frontiers (1983)
- Trial by Fire (1996)
- Arrival (2001)
- Red 13 (2002)
- Generations (2005)
- Revelation (2008)
- Eclipse (2011)
- Escape & Frontiers Live in Japan (2017)

=== Todd Rundgren ===
- 2nd Wind (1991)

=== The Storm ===
- The Storm (1991)
- Eye of the Storm (1996)

=== The V.U. ===
- Phoenix Rising (2000)

Preceded by none	Journey bass-guitarist 1973–1985	Succeeded by Bob Glaub

Preceded by Randy Jackson	Journey bass-guitarist 1995 – 2020	Succeeded by Randy Jackson
