= Best of Shooting Star =

Greatest hits album by Shooting Star
- Released: July 1989
- Genre: Rock; Hard rock
- Label: V&R Distribution

Shooting Star chronology
| Silent Scream (1985) | Best of Shooting Star (1989) | Shooting Star/Hang On for Your Life (1991) |

Professional ratings
Review scores
| Source | Rating |
|---|---|
| Allmusic | 3/5 stars |

Best of Shooting Star (a.k.a. Touch Me Tonight) is a compilation by American Rock band Shooting Star. The album predominantly consists of songs taken from the band's first four studio albums, all of which charted on the 'Billboard Top Album' chart at the time of their release; along with two songs ("Christmas Together" and "Touch Me Tonight") which had never before featured on a Shooting Star album prior to the release of Best of Shooting Star.

== Track listing ==
All tracks are written by Van McLain and Gary West (except where noted).

| No. | Title | Length |
|---|---|---|
| 1. | "Last Chance" | 6:57 |
| 2. | "Bring It On" | 4:50 |
| 3. | "You Got What I Need" | 3:50 |
| 4. | "Tonight" | 4:43 |
| 5. | "Flesh and Blood" | 5:51 |
| 6. | "Hollywood" | 4:13 |
| 7. | "Hang on for Your Life" | 3:26 |
| 8. | "Breakout" | 3:41 |
| 9. | "Heartache" | 3:52 |
| 10. | "Straight Ahead" | 3:20 |
| 11. | "Train Rolls On" | 4:18 |
| 12. | "Christmas Together" | 5:09 |
| 13. | "Touch Me Tonight" (McLain) | 4:10 |

- Tracks 1–4 are taken from Shooting Star (1980).
- Tracks 5–8 are taken from Hang On for Your Life (1981).
- Track 9 is taken from III Wishes (1982).
- Tracks 10 and 11 are taken from Burning (1983).
- Track 12 was previously a single-only release in 1985.
- Track 13 was previously unreleased.

== Personnel ==
Shooting Star

- Van McLain – lead vocals, guitars (all tracks)
- Steve Thomas – drums, percussion (all tracks)
- Gary West – lead vocals, piano, keyboards, timpani drums (tracks 1–12)
- Charles Waltz – backing vocals, violin, keyboards (tracks 1–12)
- Ron Verlin – bass guitar (tracks 1–11 and 13)
- Bill Guffey – keyboards (tracks 1–8)
- Norm Dahlor – bass guitar (track 12)
- Keith Mitchell – lead vocals (track 13)
- Dennis Laffoon – keyboards (track 13)

Additional personnel

- Unidos – backing vocals (track 12)
- Baby Lee – backing vocals (track 13)
