= Moondance Jam =

Annual rock and classic rock festival held near Walker, Minnesota

Moondance Jam is an annual rock and classic rock festival held in mid-July in the Leech Lake/Chippewa National Forest Area near Walker, Minnesota. It is recognized as Minnesota's largest rock festival and a major classic rock festival in the United States. The Jam has gone from being a party for a few hundred family and friends back in 1992 to a rock 'n' roll and camping celebration that entertains tens of thousands today mainly because it has maintained a clean, safe and friendly atmosphere along with open festival seating for general admission ticket holders.

== History ==
=== Early beginnings ===
The Moondance Jam was started by Bill and Kathy Bieloh in 1992, when they sought a way to promote the riding stables that they owned. The first jam was a modest start featuring mostly regional acts, as well as The Blenders, spread out over two days. In 1993, the jam expanded and featured Head East and Badfinger, beginning a tradition of more established and popular classic rock acts. For the third jam in 1994, popular country artists were brought in, and it became the most country music styled jam to date with bands like Pirates of the Mississippi and Johnny Paycheck.

=== The mid-1990s ===
The mid-1990s established Moondance Jam as the highly popular annual classic rock festival that it is today. 1995's jam featured the most popular classic rock acts yet, including Kansas, The Guess Who, Survivor and Starship featuring Mickey Thomas. The following year, the tradition continued with Starship featuring Mickey Thomas once again, along with Three Dog Night, Randy Bachman of Bachman–Turner Overdrive, .38 Special and the Edgar Winter Group. In 1997, the festival was lengthened to three days, and a record 35,000 people attended the jam. REO Speedwagon, America, Grand Funk Railroad and Loverboy entertained the record crowds.

=== The late 1990s ===
Moondance Jam became Minnesota's largest rock festival after 1998's jam when a crowd of 50,000 showed up to hear the music of a record number of national classic rock acts including Steve Miller, Foreigner, Yes and April Wine. After the jam of '98, the facilities were upgraded since traffic became backed up over 7 miles (11 km) leading up to the site. Many attendees pulled to the side of the road and walked five miles (8 km) to get to the grounds. In 1999, the jam continued to grow, although two inches of rain on the opening day created large amounts of mud that made a mess of the facility. Still, bands including Lynyrd Skynyrd, Blue Öyster Cult, Joan Jett and Electric Light Orchestra took the stage.

=== Turn of the millennium ===
2000's jam featured a more organized facility with an expanded parking lot, more camping space, and shuttles to and from each area of the grounds. Peter Frampton, The Beach Boys, Joe Walsh, Styx and The Doobie Brothers were among the largest spectrum of national classic rock acts yet. The Moondance Jam celebrated its 10th anniversary in 2001 with good weather and bands like Ted Nugent, Pat Benatar, Molly Hatchet, Night Ranger and George Thorogood, along with a very large selection of regional bands. 2002 continued the tradition with improved sound and lighting effects and bands such as Journey, Styx, Blondie, Scorpions and Loverboy. Four nights of the nation's top national classic rock bands in 2003 made the jam the largest classic rock festival in the United States. Alice Cooper, Sammy Hagar, Lou Gramm and Boston drew in a record crowd.

=== The Jam in the 2000s ===
Since 2004, the Jam has been acclaimed as "the best classic rock festival in the nation", and as one of the best music festivals. The quantity and the popularity of the national classic rock bands increased almost every year afterward.

The Jam has also become a place for regional acts to find an audience on three smaller stages; one in the Moondance Jam Saloon, one outdoors in the Tiki Bar, and the acoustic stage in the Lazy Moon Bar & Grill. The Lazy Moon Bar & Grill was added to provide more entertainment and an opportunity for fans to get an up close view of the backstage area. The backstage viewing along with festival seating continues the Moondance tradition of giving general admission ticket holders more opportunities to get close to their favorite bands.

In 2010, Moondance Jam added a few modern and 90s rock bands to their festival lineup to mix in with the classic rockers. It turned out to be a huge success with huge crowds packing the festival grounds all three days. Blaze TV also joined the party to film 10 of shows in HD for DIRECTV. The programs aired as part of the DIRECTV Concert Series on The 101 Network from November 2010 through 2012. Moondance Jam has continued the mix modern and 90s rock bands with its 80s and classic rock lineup since then.

The COVID-19 pandemic in 2020 caused officials to scrap the Jam and defer to 2021.

== Facilities ==
Moondance Jam is Minnesota's largest rock festival and one of the premier classic rock festivals in the United States. The Jam is patrolled by many police agencies, as well as EMS crews in case of an emergency. The Jam features a rock and classic rock lineup, 300 acres (1.2 km^{2}) of camping and facilities, food and beverage stands, open festival seating up to the stage, along with available VIP seating and treatment. The friendly and safe atmosphere is considered one of reasons why the festival has gone from being a party for a few thousand in 1992 to an event that entertains tens of thousands from all over the world.

== Promotion and production ==
In 2005, Moondance Jam was named the Premier Classic Rock Festival in the United States by the Classic Rock Revisited magazine and fanzine The event, along with its sister festival, Moondance Jammin Country Fest, was produced by TEA Productions of Minneapolis until 2011. In 2010, ten Moondance shows were filmed and produced by Blaze TV exclusively for DIRECTV to be shown on The 101 Network's concert series and rerun for two years. Reo Speedwagon also released the album "Live at Moondance Jam" from the Blaze TV footage. This was also the year that Moondance Jam began to feature more 90s and modern acts to go with its classic rock and 80s lineup of bands. Neste Event Marketing of Nashville produced both festivals from 2012-2019.

== Past (and current) national bands at the Jam ==
JAM XXX - 2022 TBD

JAM 28 - 2019 Lynyrd Skynyrd, Train, Skillet (band), The Goo Goo Dolls, Gov't Mule, Rick Springfield, Survivor (band), Allen Stone, Molly Hatchet, Candlebox, Vixen (band), The Sweet, Cold Kingdom, ThundHerStruck, Mountain Ash

JAM 27 - 2018 Kid Rock, Tesla, Bret Michaels, Joan Jett & The Blackhearts, Kansas, Fuel, Ace Frehley, The Sweet, Jackyl, KIX, Lita Ford, Saliva, GB Leighton, Crow, Hairball, Def Leggend, Mountain Ash

JAM 26 - 2017 Steve Miller Band, Live, Halestorm, Peter Frampton, Melissa Etheridge, The Pretty Reckless, Better Than Ezra, Vince Neil of Mötley Crüe, Black Stone Cherry, Starship featuring Mickey Thomas, Jack Russell's Great White, Dorothy, Cowboy Mouth, Cold Kingdom, ThundHerStruck, The Fabulous Armadillos, Atomic Punks, Mountain Ash

JAM 25 - 2016 Godsmack, Boston, Chicago, Bush, Sixx A.M., Chevelle, Rick Springfield, Queensrÿche, Loverboy, Blues Traveler, Kix, Little River Band, Foghat, Firehouse, ThundHerStruck, Killer Queen, The Fabulous Armadillos & Collective Unconscious "Takin it to the Limit" Tribute to the Eagles, Mountain Ash

JAM 24 - 2015 Sammy Hagar with Michael Anthony, Shinedown, The Doobie Brothers, Huey Lewis and the News, Peter Frampton, Papa Roach, Black Stone Cherry, Jefferson Starship, Finger Eleven, Vixen, Honeymoon Suite, Black Star Riders, Pop Evil, Shinedown, Pat Travers, ThundHerStruck, Hairball, The Fabulous Armadillos, Alive: A Tribute To Pearl jam

JAM 23 - 2014 REO Speedwagon, Styx, Seether, Foreigner, Collective Soul, George Thorogood, Sublime with Rome, Don Felder, Alterbridge, Skillet, The Wallflowers, Sick Puppies, Slaughter, Autograph, Badfinger featuring Joey Molland

JAM 22 - 2013 Mötley Crüe, Slash, The Offspring, Cheap Trick, Bachman & Turner, Theory Of A Deadman, Buckcherry, Blue Öyster Cult, Halestorm, Shooting Star, Johnny Rivers, Head East, Cain, Sweet, Atomic Punks

JAM 21 - 2012 Kid Rock, John Fogerty, Heart, Hinder, Three Days Grace, Grand Funk Railroad, Skid Row, Don Felder, Night Ranger, April Wine, Cavo, Atomic Punks: The Tribute to Early Van Halen, Motley Inc: A Tribute to Mötley Crüe, Free Fallin: Tribute to Tom Petty, Them Pesky Kids, Hairball, Mountain Ash, The Bad Animals: A Tribute To Heart

JAM 20 - 2011 Three Doors Down, Kiss, Stone Temple Pilots, 38 Special, Paul Rodgers, Joan Jett & The Blackhearts, Great White, Eddie Money, Candlebox, Outlaws, Fuel, Burton Cummings, Cracker, Belfast Cowboys: A Tribute To Van Morrison, ThundHerStruck: A Tribute To AC/DC, Hairball, Mountain Ash, Cain, The Bad Animals: A Tribute To Heart

JAM 19 - 2010 Lynyrd Skynyrd, Sammy Hagar and the Wabos, Buckcherry, REO Speedwagon, Pat Benatar, Jonny Lang, Collective Soul, Don Felder, The Smithereens, Hoobastank, Cinderella, Black Stone Cherry, Pat Travers, Blackberry Smoke, Tonic

JAM 18 (Rockin' 18) - 2009 Journey, Yes, Judas Priest, Sheryl Crow, Whitesnake, Asia, Kansas, Grand Funk Railroad, Lita Ford, Foghat, Spin Doctors, Shooting Star, Zed Leppelin, ThundHerStruck, Ozzmosis

JAM 17 (Sizzlin' 17) - 2008 Crosby, Stills & Nash, Poison, Sammy Hagar & The Wabos, Styx, George Thorogood & the Destroyers, Creedence Clearwater Revisited, Sweet, Great White, Toto The Guess Who, Boz Scaggs, Sebastian Bach, Kenny Wayne Shepherd, Big Brother & The Holding Company, Gear Daddies, Otis Day and the Knights, Led Zepagain

JAM 16 (Sweet 16) - 2007 Def Leppard, The New Cars, The Moody Blues, Rick Springfield, REO Speedwagon, Tesla, Toto, Big Head Todd and the Monsters, Loverboy, The Fixx, Kansas, Rick Derringer, Jackyl, Soul Asylum, Cheap Trick, Scarlet Haze

JAM 15 (Dream 15) - 2006 Heart, Poison, Alice Cooper, Steve Miller Band, Doobie Brothers, Ted Nugent, The Bangles, The Guess Who, Dennis DeYoung, Gregg Rolie Band, Kenny Wayne Shepherd, John Kay & Steppenwolf, Starship featuring Mickey Thomas, Outlaws, Little River Band, Y&T

JAM 14 (Fab 14) - 2005 Twisted Sister, Whitesnake, Cinderella, Journey, Tesla, REO Speedwagon, Cheap Trick, Grand Funk Railroad, Lynyrd Skynyrd, 38 Special, Ratt, FireHouse, Blackfoot, Wishbone Ash, Loverboy, Daisy Dillman Band, Savoy Brown

JAM 13 (Lucky 13) - 2004 Huey Lewis and the News, Rick Springfield, John Waite, The FIXX, John Fogerty, Pat Benatar & Neil Giraldo, Santana's Gregg Rolie, Edgar Winter, The Allman Brothers Band, Lynyrd Skynyrd, Little Feat, ZZ Top, Chris Robinson & NEM

JAM 12 - 2003 Alice Cooper, Sammy Hagar & the Waboritas, Boston, Joe Cocker, George Thorogood & the Destroyers, Rick Springfield, Joan Jett, Gypsy, Lou Gramm, War, The Fabulous Thunderbirds, Indigenous, Mitch Ryder, Head East, Corey Stevens, Rockin Dopsie Jr. & the Zydeco Twisters,

JAM 11 - 2002 Scorpions, Deep Purple, Dio, Loverboy, Journey, Blondie, Indigenous, Gypsy, Meat Loaf, Styx, Gin Blossoms, Black Oak Arkansas, .38 Special, The Little River Band, Paul Revere & the Raiders, Gary Puckett

JAM 10 - 2001 Ted Nugent, Pat Benatar, Creedence Clearwater Revisited, Night Ranger, Dave Mason, George Thorogood & the Delaware Destroyers, REO Speedwagon, Big Head Todd & the Monsters, Molly Hatchet, The Wallflowers, Blues Traveler, The Marshall Tucker Band, Head East, The Byrds Celebration, The Little River Band

JAM 2000 Peter Frampton, The Beach Boys, Paul Rodgers, The Knack, The Yardbirds, Joe Walsh, George Thorogood & the Destroyers, Kenny Wayne Shepherd Band, NRBQ (New Rhythm & Blues Quartet), Leslie West of Mountain, The Doobie Brothers, Creedence Clearwater Revisited, Leon Russell, Styx, Eric Burdon & the New Animals, Rockin Dopsie Jr. & the Zydeco Twisters

JAM VIII - 1999 Cheap Trick, ELO Part II, Joan Jett & the Blackhearts, Blue Öyster Cult, The Outfield, Lynyrd Skynyrd, Hank Williams Jr., Chris Duarte, Lamont Cranston, REO Speedwagon, Eddie Money, .38 Special, John Cafferty & the Beaver Brown Band, Starship featuring Mickey Thomas, Mitch Ryder & the Detroit Wheels

JAM VII - 1998 Foreigner, Eddie Money, Steppenwolf, April Wine, Yes, Alan Parsons' Live Project, The John Entwistle Band, Lamont Cranston, Steve Miller, Jonny Lang, Foghat

JAM VI - 1997 REO Speedwagon, Marshall Tucker Band, Corey Stevens, America, Nazareth, Loverboy, The Turtles, Felix Cavaliere

JAM V - 1996 .38 Special, Randy Bachman, Edgar Winter Group, Starship featuring Mickey Thomas, Mitch Ryder, The Grass Roots, Three Dog Night, The Byrds Celebration

JAM IV - 1995 Kansas, Survivor, Starship featuring Mickey Thomas, The Guess Who, The Grass Roots

JAM III - 1994 Gary Puckett, Mel McDaniel, Pirates of the Mississippi, Johnny Paycheck

JAM II - 1993 Ozark Mountain Daredevils, Badfinger, Head East, Lamont Cranston

JAM '92 - 1992 The Blenders, Fantastic Convertibles, The Classics, Fever, Sparky and the Time Pirates
