= Shooting Star/Hang On for Your Life =

Compilation album by Shooting Star
- Released: 1991
- Genre: Rock; Hard rock
- Label: V&R

Shooting Star chronology
| Best of Shooting Star (1989) | Shooting Star/Hang On for Your Life (1991) | It's Not Over (1991) |

Professional ratings
Review scores
| Source | Rating |
|---|---|
| AllMusic | 3/5 stars |

Shooting Star/Hang On For Your Life is the 1991 re-release of Shooting Star's first two albums, Shooting Star and Hang On for Your Life, on compact disc. The compilation was released by their own label after gaining the rights back. Two songs were deleted due to time constraints "Sweet Elatia" and "Stranger".

== Track listing ==
All tracks are written by Van McLain and Gary West (except where noted).

| No. | Title | Length |
|---|---|---|
| 1. | "You Got What I Need" | 3:45 |
| 2. | "Don't Stop Now" | 4:36 |
| 3. | "Higher" (Michael Brown, McLain, West) | 4:15 |
| 4. | "Just Friends" | 3:58 |
| 5. | "Bring It On" | 4:45 |
| 6. | "Tonight" | 4:38 |
| 7. | "Rainfall" | 2:49 |
| 8. | "Midnight Man" | 3:35 |
| 9. | "Last Chance" | 6:51 |
| 10. | "Flesh And Blood" | 5:48 |
| 11. | "Hang On For Your Life" | 3:22 |
| 12. | "Are You On My Side" | 3:15 |
| 13. | "Teaser" | 3:15 |
| 14. | "Hollywood" | 4:10 |
| 15. | "Breakout" | 3:39 |
| 16. | "You're So Good" | 3:48 |
| 17. | "She's Got Money" | 3:35 |
| 18. | "You've Got Love" | 4:53 |

== Personnel ==
- Van McLain – guitars, lead vocals
- Gary West – lead vocals, guitars, keyboards
- Bill Guffey – keyboards
- Steve Thomas – drums
- Ron Verlin – bass
- Charles Waltz – violin, keyboards, vocals
