= Brad Zellar =

American author and journalist

- Born: November 16, 1961 (age 64)
- Occupations: Writer, journalist
- Relatives: Martin Zellar
- Writing career
- Genres: Photography, American history
- Website: Official website

Brad Zellar (born November 16, 1961) is an American author, journalist, and cultural historian whose work often explores overlooked stories, people, and landscapes of the American Midwest. He is the author of several books, including Suburban World: The Norling Photos (2008), The 1968 Project: A Nation Coming of Age (2011), and Till the Wheels Fall Off (2022). Zellar has also collaborated extensively with photographers on image–text projects that extend his documentary approach to American life.

== Early life and education ==
Zellar grew up in Austin, Minnesota, in a large and active family. His father was a mechanic who owned a repair shop in Hollandale, Minnesota. He attended Banfield Elementary School in Austin. In interviews, he has described being both social and lonely as a child, developing a love of solitude, wandering gravel roads, and observing the world around him. The 1985–86 Hormel strike in Austin left a lasting impression, shaping his sensitivity to working-class life and community tensions.

== Career ==
Zellar began his career in journalism, working as a writer and editor for Minnesota newspapers including the St. Paul Pioneer Press and the Star Tribune. He also wrote professionally for the alt-weekly City Pages, contributed to the Utne Reader, and served as literary critic and senior editor for The Rake. His essays and criticism have also appeared in The Believer, Rain Taxi, The Paris Review Daily, and Places Journal.

In 2008, Zellar published Suburban World: The Norling Photos (Minnesota Historical Society Press), pairing his essays with rediscovered photographs by Irwin D. Norling. The book was praised for its sensitive blend of vernacular photography and cultural commentary. The Coen brothers later cited it as a visual influence on their film A Serious Man (2009).

His book The 1968 Project: A Nation Coming of Age (2011) accompanied the Minnesota Historical Society’s exhibition on the cultural and political upheavals of the late 1960s.

In 2022, Zellar published Till the Wheels Fall Off (Coffee House Press), a coming-of-age novel set in the 1970s Midwest. The book follows a teenage narrator navigating family life, friendship, popular culture, and the uncertainties of adolescence against the backdrop of small-town America. Blending autobiography, fiction, and cultural history, the novel draws on Zellar’s longstanding interest in overlooked communities and ordinary lives. Reviewers noted its mix of humor and melancholy, its intimate voice, and its ability to evoke the textures of 1970s Midwestern life. The Star Tribune described the book as “a tender, sometimes raw evocation of growing up in the 1970s Midwest,” while others, including Kirkus Reviews, praised its sentence-level snap and meditative tone; Foreword Reviews called it “affecting, introspective … embracing the beauty of memory and the power of resilience.”

In addition to his print work, Zellar was an early adopter of blogging, writing professionally for City Pages and The Rake. His blogs attracted an international readership, including in Ireland and Australia, and were noted by the Minnesota Magazine and Publishing Association.

== Photography collaborations ==
Zellar has worked extensively with photographers on projects that combine images and text. His most sustained partnership has been with Minnesota-based photographer Alec Soth. Together they created the LBM Dispatch series (2012–2014), a set of seven newspaper-format publications produced on the road across the United States. Each issue paired Zellar’s on-the-ground reporting with Soth’s photographs and was designed to evoke the tradition of American documentary travelogues. Subjects ranged from the Rust Belt to the Colorado plains, focusing on everyday life, local culture, and communities often overlooked in mainstream media.

Zellar and Soth also collaborated on House of Coates (2012; reissued by Coffee House Press in 2014), a novelistic work blending Zellar’s text with photographs attributed to Lester B. Morrison. The story centers on a mysterious recluse living along U.S. Route 52 during one of the coldest winters on record; the project has been described as part fiction, part documentary, and part photobook.

Zellar’s other collaborations include Conductors of the Moving World (2011), a limited-edition artist book with photographs attributed to Eizo Ota. The book was named in Time's “Best of 2011: The Photobooks We Loved” and received the 2012 Photography for Design – Professional Award from D&AD (British Design & Art Direction).

In 2018, Zellar worked with photographer Jason Vaughn on Driftless (TBW Books), which explored Wisconsin’s Driftless Area, a region left untouched by glaciers during the last Ice Age. Vaughn’s large-format color photographs of farmland, forests, and rural communities were paired with Zellar’s essays, which wove together history, folklore, and personal observation. The book examined themes of land use, agricultural change, and resilience in small towns, while reflecting on Midwestern cultural identity; reviewers noted that Zellar’s writing complemented Vaughn’s quiet, contemplative images to create a layered portrait of the landscape.

== Reception ==
Critics have highlighted Zellar’s blend of cultural history, empathy, and storytelling. Writing about Suburban World: The Norling Photos, the Star Tribune praised the book for sensitively pairing vernacular photographs with Zellar’s essays. Rain Taxi described it as a sharp, affectionate meditation on American suburbia and the cultural shifts of the 1960s and 1970s. When Till the Wheels Fall Off was released, the Star Tribune called it “a tender, sometimes raw evocation of growing up in the 1970s Midwest,” and Minneapolis–St. Paul Magazine praised its evocation of time and place. National outlets including The New York Times and The New York Times Magazine covered the LBM Dispatch projects, while The New Yorker and American Photo emphasized how the collaboration combined journalism, literature, and documentary photography in an innovative format. The Paris Review Daily described Zellar’s writing as a “marvelous crutch” for visual work, emphasizing how his text extends and complicates photographic narratives.

== Awards and recognition ==
In addition to Time magazine naming Conductors of the Moving World one of the “Best Photobooks of 2011” and its 2012 D&AD award, Zellar has received recognition from the Society of Professional Journalists, the Association of Alternative Newsmedia, and the Minnesota Magazine and Publishing Association.

His 2022 novel Till the Wheels Fall Off was a finalist for the 2023 Minnesota Book Awards in the Novel & Short Story category. Publishers Weekly praised the book as “a thoughtful meditation on the intersections of analog and digital … this affectionate and endearing trip down memory lane is sure to resonate with readers.” Foreword Reviews described it as “affecting, introspective … embracing the beauty of memory and the power of resilience.” The Star Tribune called it “a beautiful, captivating novel of memory, connection and music.”

== Personal life ==
Zellar is the brother of musician Martin Zellar, leader of the band Gear Daddies. Brad appears on the cover of the Gear Daddies album Billy's Live Bait as the "Live Bait" attendant. He is also an avid collector of baseball memorabilia; among his prized items are a rare 1911 first edition of Base Ball by Albert Spalding and a ball signed by Ted Williams and Mickey Mantle. His collection has been referenced in baseball writing, including Josh Ostergaard’s The Devil’s Snake Curve: A Fan’s Notes from Left Field. Zellar lived for many years in Austin, Minnesota, before moving to the Twin Cities.

== Works ==
=== Books ===
- Suburban World: The Norling Photos (Minnesota Historical Society Press, 2008)
- The 1968 Project: A Nation Coming of Age (Minnesota Historical Society Press, 2011)
- Till the Wheels Fall Off (Coffee House Press, 2022)

=== Photography collaborations ===
- Conductors of the Moving World (Little Brown Mushroom, 2011) — text by Brad Zellar; photographs by Eizo Ota
- House of Coates (Little Brown Mushroom, 2012; Coffee House Press reissue, 2014)
- Driftless (TBW Books, 2018) — with Jason Vaughn
- Township (TIS Books) — with Raymond Meeks, Adriana Ault, and Tim Carpenter; text / editing by Zellar
- Holy Land U.S.A. (Stanley/Barker) — photographs by Lisa Barlow; essay by Zellar
- Minus Thirty (Hartmann Projects) — photographs by Angela Böhm; essay by Zellar
- I Wish U Would Believe Me (Deadbeat Club) — photographs by Jason Vaughn; essay by Zellar
- LBM Dispatch series (Little Brown Mushroom, 2012–2014):
  - Ohio (2012)
  - Upstate New York (2012)
  - Michigan (2012)
  - Three Valleys (2013)
  - Colorado (2013)
  - Texas Triangle (2013)
  - Georgia (2014)

=== Anthology contributions ===
- “Better Luck Next Time” in Twin Cities Noir (Akashic Books, 2006)
- Essay in On the Verge (Void) —
