= The Dead Livers =

Australian country rock band

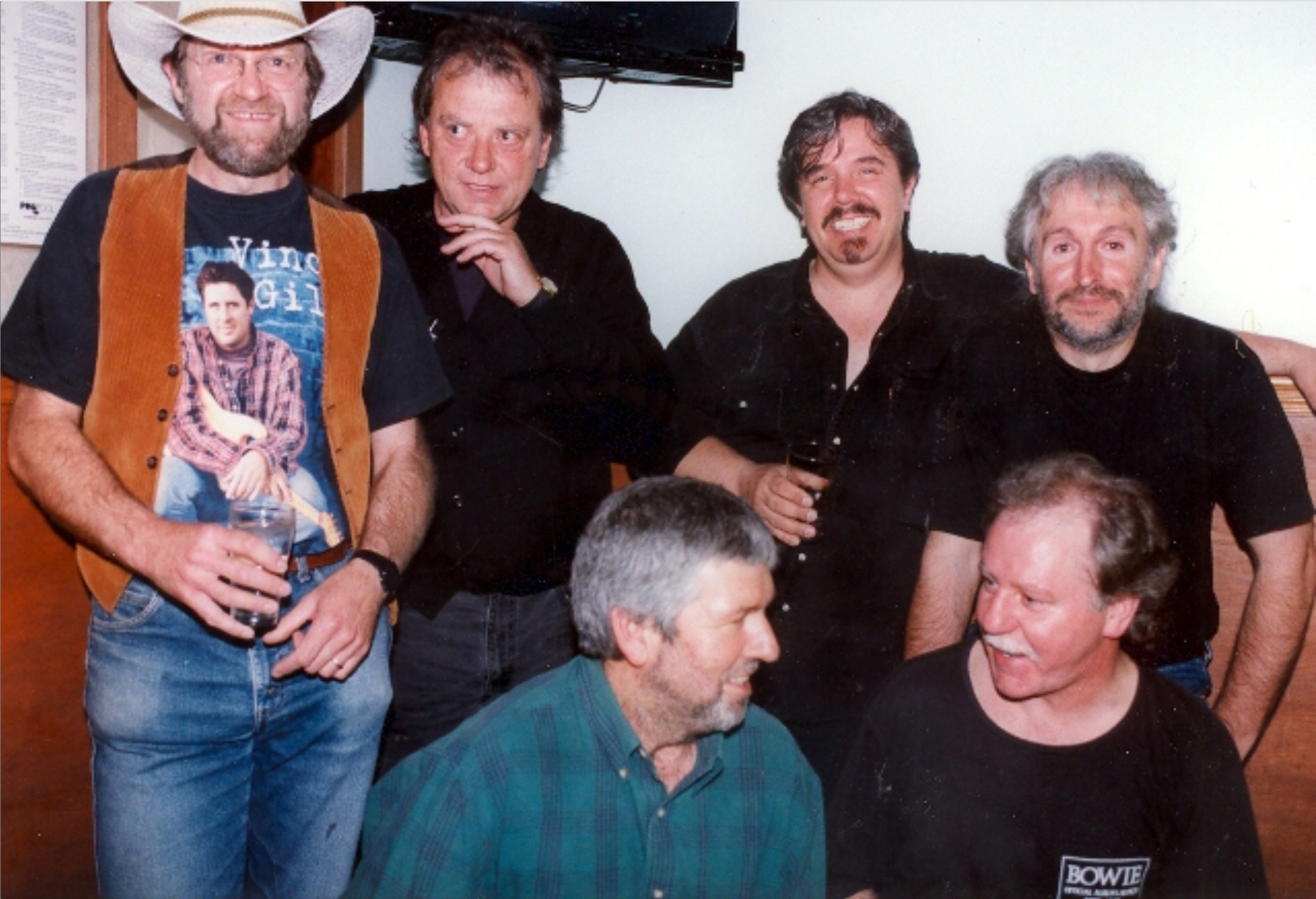
The Dead Livers in 2000

The Dead Livers are an Australian country rock band formed in Melbourne, Victoria in April 1978. Formative members were Marty Atchison (vocals) (1978–1983, 1984-), Brendan Mitchell (guitar and steel guitar) (1978–1980, 1984-), Michael Schack (bass guitar) (1978–1984, 1985-), Edward Mitchell (guitar)(1978-1978) and Tony Pizzi (drums) (1978-1978). Later members included Richard O'Keefe (drums)(1978-), Warren Keats (guitar) (1979-1979), Peter Thorne (guitar),(1979-1979), Andrew Charles (drums) (1980-1980), John Berto (guitar) (1979-), Randy Broughten (pedal steel guitar)(1979-1979)(before joining the Gear Daddies in the United States), Bob Suffern (pedal steel guitar) (1980–1984), Rodger Delfos (guitar) (1980-), Ross Nicholson (guitar and vocals) (1983–1984), Craig Reeves (piano),(1984–1988) Les Gough (bass guitar),(1984–1988) Chris Shanley (keyboards) (1995–2001) Ron Mahony (drums), (2002–2012) Don Farrell (guitar) (2002-), Jack McKinnon (keyboards) (occasional gigs 1979-) and Mark Meallin (guitar)(2014-2014).

The band is listed in the "Who's who of Australian Rock" and the "Book of Australian Country Music" speaks of the group's distinctive blend of a country rock sound.

The original quintet was a finalist at the 3UZ country music battle of the bands in Melbourne in 1978, and a modified lineup achieved top ten status in the inaugural "Starmaker Quest" in Tamworth, New South Wales in 1979. The band's first single "Grandpa" / "Ballad of a Dead Liver", was issued in 1979, followed by a self-titled vinyl EP. In April 1980, the band made its first television appearance in Sydney on the John Singleton Show, and in July 1980 was the support act for Leon Russell and the Amazing Rhythm Aces. The Australian Music Directory (published in 1981) reported that "their most extensive publicity and radio exposure came in February 1981 when they recorded a parody of Slim Dusty's national number one hit Duncan. I'd love to have a joint with Willie gained national front page headlines and a hearty endorsement from mentor Willie Nelson, who adopted it as his official theme song for the entire Australasian tour".

In 1982, another single "Star of the West" / "A Stud Like Me" was released, and "Star of the West" was among the final nominations in the best group category at the Tamworth Country Music Festival. In 1998, previously recorded material was issued on a CD entitled Greatest Misses to coincide with the band's 20th anniversary. In 2000 a new album, Reaching to the Western Sky was launched, and the band subsequently performed at the 2001 Port Fairy Folk Festival. For the band's 40th anniversary, in 2018, the album "Greatest Misses" was remastered with the addition of three tracks not previously available in digital format. Dead Livers music also became available on digital platforms such as Spotify and YouTube in that year. On 12 May 2018 the band celebrated 40 years of performing with a concert at the Thornbury Theatre in Melbourne.

Whilst live performances became scarce in the 21st century the band reunited for special events (for example Michael Schack's 70th birthday at Mickey Bourke's Koroit Hotel held on 22 Feb. 2020).
