= Circles (Shooting Star album) =

Studio album by Shooting Star
- Released: July 7, 2006
- Recorded: Daybreak Studios
- Genre: Rock; Hard rock
- Label: E1 Distribution
- Producer: Van McLain

Shooting Star chronology
Leap of Faith (2000)	Circles (2006)	Into the Night (2015)

Professional ratings
Review scores
Source	Rating
AllMusic	3/5 stars

Circles is the eighth album by the group Shooting Star. It is the first album to feature founding drummer Steve Thomas since 1985's Silent Scream; as well as the last album to feature original bassist Ron Verlin prior to his retirement from the band in 2009; and the only album to feature vocalist Kevin Chalfant and violinist Shane Michaels.

== Track listing ==
No.	Title	Writer(s)	Length
1.	"Runaway"	Van McLain
2.	"Without Love"	McLain, Gary West
3.	"Trouble in Paradise"	McLain
4.	"George's Song"	McLain
5.	"Borrowed Time"	McLain
6.	"Everybody's Crazy"	McLain
7.	"Temptation"	McLain
8.	"I'm a Survivor"	McLain
9.	"We're Not Alone"	Dennis Laffoon, McLain
10.	"What Love Is"	Kevin Chalfant, McLain
11.	"Bonus Track 1"	McLain

== Personnel ==
- Kevin Chalfant – lead vocals
- Shane Michaels – violin
- Van McLain – guitars, backing vocals
- Dennis Laffoon – keyboards
- Ron Verlin – bass
- Steve Thomas – drums
