= Shooting Star (band) =

American rock band

- Origin: Kansas City, Missouri, US
- Genres: Rock, hard rock
- Years active: 1978–1987; 1989–present
- Labels: Arista; Virgin; Epic; Geffen; V&R; Enigma; Renaissance; Frontiers
- Members: Steve Thomas; Dennis Laffoon; Janet Jameson; Todd Pettygrove; Chet Galloway
- Past members: Bill Guffey; Van McLain; Ron Verlin; Charles Waltz; Gary West; Norm Dahlor; Keith Mitchell; Rod Lincoln; Eric Johnson; Terry Brock; Christian Howes; Shane Michaels; Kevin Chalfant; Ronnie Platt
- Website: Official site

Shooting Star is an American rock band from Kansas City, Missouri, formed in the late 1970s. After gaining popularity in the Kansas City area, Shooting Star became the first American group to sign with Virgin Records. They recorded their debut album in England in May and June of 1979 with producer Gus Dudgeon. The band gained national exposure when a number of songs garnered moderate airplay on album-oriented rock radio stations in the US.

Shooting Star initially consisted of Van McLain (guitars, vocals), Bill Guffey (keyboards), Steve Thomas (drums), Ron Verlin (bass), Charles Waltz (violin, keyboards, vocals) and Gary West (lead vocals, guitars, keyboards, drums).

== Early history ==
Shooting Star was formed in suburban Kansas City by next-door neighbors and childhood friends Ron Verlin and Van McLain (born Van Allen McElvain on May 3, 1955, in Kansas City, Missouri; died March 2, 2018). They created a band with their brothers, Craig McLain and John Verlin, and played Beatles records in Ron's grandmother's garage. Two years later, Van and Craig had moved to different school districts and the band split up.

Upon entering Shawnee Mission South High School, Van and Ron met up again. With the 1950s nostalgia craze of 1971 brewing, they played classic 1950s hits. After seeing Sha Na Na in the movie Woodstock, they added three dancers to the act and called the band The Shooting Stars featuring The Galaxies, the name inspired by Bill Haley & His Comets.

== History ==
=== London and New York City ===
By 1974, Van began serious songwriting. The band decided to stop playing cover songs and perform their own music. Later that year, they recorded a four-song demo tape and planned a trip to London, England to shop their songs for a record deal. They left on January 6, 1975, and after three weeks of shopping their music to different record labels, they were offered a recording contract with Arista Records.

Upon signing, The Shooting Stars were given the opportunity to play a showcase performance at the legendary Marquee Club in London. The band then made their way to Morgan Studios to record their first single, Take the Money & Run (shortly before the Steve Miller hit of the same name). Arista Records then released The Shooting Stars from their contract, and they returned to Kansas City.

In 1977 Van and Ron persuaded fellow musician Gary West (born Gary Hodgden) to join them as a singer and songwriting partner. Gary, with his brother Ron West, had been a member of the premier Kansas City rock band of the 1960s, The Chesmann Square. After The Chesmann dissolved in 1974, Ron West formed the band Missouri and Gary West moved with the Chesmann's lead guitarist Jim McAllister to New York City. There they formed the group The Beckies with songwriter Michael Brown, formerly of the group The Left Banke, and former Kansas Citian Scott Trusty. The Beckies released one album on Sire Records. Upon Gary's return to Kansas City, he and Van began songwriting in earnest.

Steve Thomas had already joined on drums by 1976 and in 1977 Bill Guffey was added on keyboards for a new lineup of The Shooting Stars. And with the addition of Charles Waltz on violin, keyboards and vocals in May 1977, the name was eventually shortened to Shooting Star later the following year and they started recording demos in Gary's garage, all the while playing gigs around the Midwest.

After saving enough money and putting a press kit together they tried to secure another record deal in New York City. Through connections that Gary had made while a member of The Beckies, the band booked a showcase at the punk rock club CBGB. A representative for a new New York management firm, Golden Lion Entertainment, was in the crowd that night and offered them a contract. With a management deal secured, Shooting Star returned to Kansas City to continue writing new material.

=== Virgin Records ===
Six months later, the band's management arranged for them to play another showcase at the New York City club Tracks. Three record companies, Atlantic Records, Virgin Records and A&M Records, made offers to sign the band. Virgin, then a small British record label, succeeded. The label was looking for a rock group to break into the US market, and Shooting Star became the first American band on their roster.

In May 1979 Shooting Star returned to London to record their eponymous debut album. The album Shooting Star was released in January 1980 and the band embarked on a national tour opening for Robin Trower and Triumph. "Wild In the Streets", a B-side release, was a staple of live show encores; the song was eventually released on CD as a bonus track. "You Got What I Need", from the debut, ended up peaking at #76 on the Billboard Hot 100.

The debut album stalled out at #147 on the Billboard Top 200 and Van McLain explained his version as to why:

We had the number one most played AOR song in the country with 'Last Chance' and our record company, Virgin, had gotten into a fight with Atlantic Records, who was their distribution. We ended up not being able to get our album in the stores for six months. We should have sold a ton of albums from having that popular of a song on the radio, but when people went to the stores, they couldn't buy the album because it was not in the stores.

With the radio success, and Virgin switching over to Epic Records for their distribution, Shooting Star returned to the studio in 1981 to record Hang On for Your Life (July 1981). "Hollywood" was released as a single and climbed the Billboard Hot 100, topping out at #70. In support of the album, the band toured with ZZ Top, Cheap Trick, Todd Rundgren, Jefferson Starship and Journey. They appeared on the radio shows Rock Line, King Biscuit Flower Hour (KBFH), The Source and Westwood One.

Keyboardist Bill Guffey left the group after the recording of Hang On for Your Life.

In 1982 Shooting Star released their third album, III Wishes (July 1982), then returned to touring with such acts as REO Speedwagon, John Mellencamp, Jefferson Starship, Kansas and others.

1983 saw the release of their fourth album, Burning (June 1983) and the band once again embarked on a heavy touring schedule. But bassist Ron Verlin, who had become disenchanted with the music industry, departed in early 1984; Norm Dahlor was recruited to take over. That same year the band contributed two songs for the movie soundtrack Up the Creek (April 1984). The songs were "Get Ready Boy" and "Take It."

Virgin Records then picked up Geffen Records as their distributor and Geffen's A&R executive, John Kalodner (who had earlier championed such hugely successful acts as Foreigner and Asia), got behind the group and they began to record their fifth album, Silent Scream (April 1985). Van, Norm and Steve were also the backing band on Ian Hunter's single "Great Expectations." The band then toured with Heart, Bryan Adams and ZZ Top.

=== Separate ways ===
In 1986, after almost a decade of touring and five albums, Shooting Star decided to go on hiatus. A farewell show was played on December 27, 1986 at Memorial Hall in Kansas City, Kansas and after a few more concerts, Shooting Star went their separate ways in late spring of 1987. Guitarist McLain, in a 2013 interview with Goldmine Magazine, explained why the group disbanded:

We signed with Geffen, and we put out Silent Scream. Geffen got into a fight with all the radio promo guys, and they fired them the week our album came out. We had 200 ads on the radio, out of 300 reporting stations, in the first week. [The album's first track] 'Summer Sun' was being added everywhere, and it looked like the album would be a smash. After the fight with the promo guys, it dropped to 40 stations. What do you do? We really worked hard on that record, and it was the one. It just crushed Gary when it all fell apart over something that ridiculous; it literally drove him out of the music business. You put your heart and soul into this stuff, and you expect these business guys to come through for you. We got hosed four or five times. Over the next several years fans from around the world were frustrated by not being able to find Shooting Star records, which all went out of print, while the band continued to receive radio airplay.

In 1985 and 1986 West and McLain had also been working on songs for a duo project they had in the works called West-McLain. But the interest that CBS Records had shown vanished when their connection there was fired from the company. After that West, now more disillusioned than ever, decided to leave the music business once and for all.

=== Reunion ===
In July 1989 V&R Records, the band's own label, acquired the rights to release The Best of Shooting Star. This release marked the first time that any Shooting Star record appeared on CD and included two previously unreleased songs, "Christmas Together", a 1985 single which had been played on Kansas City radio, and "Touch Me Tonight", a new song by Van which peaked on the Billboard Hot 100 at #67. Enigma Records, a heavy metal label that was starting to acquire more mainstream artists, bought the rights to the album and retitled it Touch Me Tonight – The Best Of Shooting Star. In the November 4, 1989, issue of Billboard, the album was the first album to reach that magazine's pop albums chart without being available as a vinyl record.

The band also released the first two albums on one CD called Shooting Star/Hang on for Your Life; it omitted two songs from the albums ("Stranger" and "Sweet Elatia").

=== 1990s ===
With the success of The Best Of in 1989, Shooting Star was offered a new recording contract with Enigma Records. Returning to the group were original members Ron Verlin, Van McLain and Steve Thomas. The other members were Dennis Laffoon on keyboards and vocalist Keith Mitchell. Charles Waltz was originally slated to rejoin but had moved to California and was busy with another band, Toledo Waltz, while Gary West had left the music business entirely. Thomas played drums on "Touch Me Tonight" but departed shortly afterwards as he was unable to commit to music full-time during this period. He was subsequently replaced by Rod Lincoln. In Los Angeles, the band made a video for "Touch Me Tonight." It received extensive airplay on MTV, making their request chart and rose to #67 on the Billboard Hot 100. This was the highest-charting single of the band's career. The song also appeared in the Dolph Lundgren movie I Come in Peace.

In February 1991 the band released their sixth effort, It's Not Over. During the recording of this project, Enigma Records went bankrupt and the group decided to finish it on their own, releasing it on their own V & R label. After the album's release, Ron Verlin was replaced on bass by Eric Johnson (not the famous guitarist) and the band toured with Bad English, Bryan Adams, and 38 Special. After selling about 10,000 copies of It's Not Over, the group was contacted by JRS Records (whose parent company was SCS Music), which agreed to take over distribution of the album nationally. But the group became dissatisfied with JRS, claiming they did very little to promote the album, and filed a lawsuit against them on October 14, 1992, in Johnson County, Kansas District Court.

By 1993, disappointed over the collapse of Enigma, the JRS fiasco and the general decline in popularity of classic rock music, the band went into semi-retirement but resurfaced each year to play occasional concerts with Verlin back on bass.

In 1997 the violin became a part of their sound again with the addition of violinist Terry Brock (not the same man who performed as a background vocalist with Kansas on their Drastic Measures tour).

In the summer of 1999, while vacationing in Nashville, Tennessee, Van was reunited with producer/engineer Kevin Beamish. Kevin and Van had met 20 years earlier while Shooting Star was recording its first album. At that time, Kevin was a young engineer for Gus Dudgeon. Out of this chance meeting grew the plans to record and release Shooting Star's seventh album, Leap of Faith (July 2000). The recording took place at Sound Stage Studios in Nashville, Tennessee from December 1999 through February 2000.

=== 2000s ===
Shooting Star celebrated its 20th year as recording artists in 2000 with the release of Leap of Faith and a fall tour. Shane Michaels joined as the band's new violinist in May 2000, replacing Christian Howes (1999–2000), who had replaced Terry Brock. Original drummer Steve Thomas returned to the fold in late 2003 and singer Keith Mitchell left in the summer of 2005 after reported voice problems.

In July 2006 the group released the album Circles with Kevin Chalfant (ex-member of 707 and The Storm) handling the lead vocals. But since Chalfant was unable to commit to touring, he was replaced in 2007 by Ronnie Platt.

Original keyboardist Bill Guffey (born William Guffey III on July 28, 1952) died on April 12, 2007, at age 54.

Violinist Shane Michaels left the band in June 2008 to concentrate on another project, Flannigan's Right Hook, and was replaced by Janet Jameson. Bassist Ron Verlin, who had left the group twice before (in 1984 and 1991) and had taken temporary leaves of absence since his return in 1994, departed permanently in 2009; since then, keyboardist Dennis Laffoon has also covered the position of bassist.

Shooting Star was inducted into the Kansas Music Hall Of Fame on March 7, 2009. The band performed at Liberty Hall in Lawrence, Kansas with the McLain, Thomas, Lafoon, Platt, Jameson lineup, with special guest Ron Verlin on bass, and for two songs, original vocalist Gary West. Other former members were on hand that evening but did not perform.

=== 2010s–present ===
Ronnie Platt left the band in 2011 to work with Chicago band Arra. His final performance with Shooting Star was in September 2010, leading to a period between 2011 and 2012 where, for the first and only time in the band's history, Van McLain was the band's sole lead vocalist (with occasional help from the band's violinist, Janet Jameson).

McLain spent the first part of 2012 focusing on a solo project to be released by Alligator Records before returning to Shooting Star in the second half of 2012 (this album, New Blue, was not released until 2022). Keith Mitchell returned as lead vocalist in 2012 but left again in 2013 due to health problems. Janet Jameson also left the band at this time. Topeka, Kansas native Todd Pettygrove, from the band Vandelyn Kross, then joined in June 2013 as the new lead singer, making his live debut with the group the following month at Moondance Jam in Walker, Minnesota.

Shooting Star returned to the UK in October 2013 to play "Firefest", the melodic rock festival that takes place each year at Nottingham Rock City.

In July 2014 former Shooting Star vocalist Ronnie Platt joined Kansas as the replacement for departing lead vocalist Steve Walsh.

Marking 35 years since their first album, Shooting Star released Into the Night in July 2015, which was initially available as a free download at the band's website.

During this time period, Van McLain, Dennis Laffoon and Steve Thomas, in addition to their Shooting Star duties, had also performed in the Overland Park, Kansas area as a trio – The Star Blues Band.

In September 2015 Van McLain experienced "flu-like" symptoms that became increasingly worse. After experiencing slurred speech, he was taken to the emergency room where he began to show severe symptoms of encephalitis. He was diagnosed with West Nile fever and was hospitalized for over eight months.

On September 24, 2017 a special Shooting Star Relief Fund concert was held in Kansas City to assist McLain with his continuing recovery from West Nile fever. The concert featured members of the KC music scene including The Elders, 2nd House, members of The Rainmakers and a Shooting Star Past & Present performance with Steve Thomas, Dennis Laffoon and Todd Pettygrove performing with guests Gary West, Ron Verlin, Norm Dahlor, Janet Jameson and Pettygrove's former bandmate Chet Galloway, handpicked and standing in for Van on guitar.

Shooting Star had remained inactive since McLain's illness began in late 2015 and, tragically, McLain died on March 2, 2018 from complications of his West Nile virus infection at age 62. Reportedly, since McLain had been receiving treatments for cancer after having survived it since the mid-90s, his immune system had been weakened and left vulnerable to the disease.

Shooting Star announced in late 2018 they would play a concert on January 19, 2019 in Kansas City with a revamped lineup to include former violin player Janet Jameson and new guitarist/vocalist Chet Galloway. According to the band's official website, McLain's family fully supported a reforming and continuation of Shooting Star, and the current lineup planned to announce additional shows.

== Personnel ==
=== Current members ===
- Steve Thomas – drums (1978–1987, 1989, 2003–present)
- Dennis Laffoon – keyboards, bass, vocals (1989–present)
- Janet Jameson – violin, vocals (2008–2013, 2018–present)
- Todd Pettygrove – lead vocals (2013–present)
- Chet Galloway – lead vocals, guitars (2018–present)

=== Former members ===
- Bill Guffey – keyboards (1978–1981; died 2007)
- Van McLain – lead vocals, guitars (1978–1987, 1989–2018; his death)
- Ron Verlin – bass (1978–1984, 1989–1991, 1994–2009)
- Charles Waltz – violin, keyboards, backing vocals (1978–1987)
- Gary West – lead vocals, guitars, keyboards, drums (1978–1987)
- Norm Dahlor – bass (1984–1987)
- Keith Mitchell – lead vocals (1989–2005, 2012–2013)
- Rod Lincoln – drums (1989–2003)
- Eric Johnson – bass (1991–1994)
- Terry Brock – violin (1997–1999)
- Christian Howes – violin (1999–2000)
- Shane Michaels – violin (2000–2008)
- Kevin Chalfant – lead vocals (2005–2007)
- Ronnie Platt – lead vocals (2007–2011)

=== Lineups ===
1978–1981	1981–1983	1984–1987	1987–1989
Bill Guffey – keyboards; Van McLain – lead vocals, guitars; Steve Thomas – drums; Ron Verlin – bass; Charles Waltz – violin, keyboards, backing vocals; Gary West – lead vocals, guitars, keyboards	Van McLain – lead vocals, guitars; Steve Thomas – drums; Ron Verlin – bass; Charles Waltz – violin, keyboards, backing vocals; Gary West – lead vocals, guitars, keyboards	Van McLain – lead vocals, guitars; Steve Thomas – drums; Charles Waltz – violin, keyboards, backing vocals; Gary West – lead vocals, guitars, keyboards; Norm Dahlor – bass	Disbanded
1989	1989–1991	1991–1994	1994–1997
Van McLain – lead vocals, guitars; Steve Thomas – drums; Dennis Laffoon – keyboards, backing vocals; Keith Mitchell – lead vocals; Ron Verlin – bass	Van McLain – lead vocals, guitars; Dennis Laffoon – keyboards, backing vocals; Keith Mitchell – lead vocals; Ron Verlin – bass; Rod Lincoln – drums	Van McLain – lead vocals, guitars; Dennis Laffoon – keyboards, backing vocals; Keith Mitchell – lead vocals; Rod Lincoln – drums; Eric Johnson – bass	Van McLain – lead vocals, guitars; Dennis Laffoon – keyboards, backing vocals; Keith Mitchell – lead vocals; Rod Lincoln – drums; Ron Verlin – bass
1997–1999	1999–2000	2000–2003	2003–2005
Van McLain – lead vocals, guitars; Dennis Laffoon – keyboards, backing vocals; Keith Mitchell – lead vocals; Rod Lincoln – drums; Ron Verlin – bass; Terry Brock – violin	Van McLain – lead vocals, guitars; Dennis Laffoon – keyboards, backing vocals; Keith Mitchell – lead vocals; Rod Lincoln – drums; Ron Verlin – bass; Christian Howes – violin	Van McLain – lead vocals, guitars; Dennis Laffoon – keyboards, backing vocals; Keith Mitchell – lead vocals; Rod Lincoln – drums; Ron Verlin – bass; Shane Michaels – violin	Van McLain – lead vocals, guitars; Dennis Laffoon – keyboards, backing vocals; Keith Mitchell – lead vocals; Ron Verlin – bass; Shane Michaels – violin; Steve Thomas – drums
2005–2007	2007–2008	2008–2009	2009–2011
Van McLain – lead vocals, guitars; Dennis Laffoon – keyboards, backing vocals; Ron Verlin – bass; Shane Michaels – violin; Steve Thomas – drums; Kevin Chalfant – lead vocals	Van McLain – lead vocals, guitars; Dennis Laffoon – keyboards, backing vocals; Ron Verlin – bass; Shane Michaels – violin; Steve Thomas – drums; Ronnie Platt – lead vocals	Van McLain – lead vocals, guitars; Dennis Laffoon – keyboards, backing vocals; Ron Verlin – bass; Steve Thomas – drums; Ronnie Platt – lead vocals; Janet Jameson – violin, backing vocals	Van McLain – lead vocals, guitars; Dennis Laffoon – keyboards, bass, backing vocals; Steve Thomas – drums; Ronnie Platt – lead vocals; Janet Jameson – violin, backing vocals
2011–2012	2012–2013	2013–2018	2018–present
Van McLain – lead vocals, guitars; Dennis Laffoon – keyboards, bass, backing vocals; Steve Thomas – drums; Janet Jameson – violin, backing vocals	Van McLain – lead vocals, guitars; Dennis Laffoon – keyboards, bass, backing vocals; Steve Thomas – drums; Janet Jameson – violin, backing vocals; Keith Mitchell – lead vocals	Van McLain – lead vocals, guitars; Dennis Laffoon – keyboards, bass, backing vocals; Steve Thomas – drums; Todd Pettygrove – lead vocals	Dennis Laffoon – keyboards, bass, backing vocals; Steve Thomas – drums; Todd Pettygrove – lead vocals; Chet Galloway – lead vocals, guitars; Janet Jameson – violin, backing vocals

== Discography ==
=== Albums ===
Studio albums

Year	Title	Peak positions	Album notes
Year	Title	US	Album notes
1980	Shooting Star	147	14 weeks on chart
1981	Hang On For Your Life	92	30 weeks on chart
1982	III Wishes	82	9 weeks on chart
1983	Burning	162	6 weeks on chart
1985	Silent Scream	–	–
1991	It's Not Over	–	–
2000	Leap of Faith	–	–
2006	Circles	–	–
2015	Into the Night	–	–

- Into The Night was offered in 2015 as a free download.

Live albums

Year	Title	Album notes
1996	Shooting Star Live	–

Compilation albums

Year	Title	Album notes
1989	Touch Me Tonight – The Best Of Shooting Star	–
1991	Shooting Star/Hang On For Your Life	Compilation of first two albums; excludes "Stranger" and "Sweet Elatia"
2001	Best of...V2	Cowtown Records; includes live recordings
2007	Anthology	Renaissance Records
2020	Anthology 40 Years (Singles)	Limited Edition Vinyl-Only Release

=== Singles ===
Year	Title	Peak positions		Album
Year	Title	Hot 100	US Rock	Album
1979	"You've Got What I Need"	76	–	Shooting Star
1980	"Wild In The Streets"	–	–	Non-Album Single; UK-only release
1981	"Hollywood"	70	–	Hang On For Your Life
1981	"Flesh And Blood"	–	–	Hang On For Your Life
1982	"Hang On For Your Life"	–	52	Hang On For Your Life
1982	"Where You Gonna Run"	–	–	III Wishes
1982	"Do You Feel Alright"	–	37	III Wishes
1983	"Reach Out, I'll Be There"	–	–	Burning
1983	"Straight Ahead"	–	25	Burning
1983	"Train Rolls On"	–		Burning
1985	"Summer Sun"	–	–	Silent Scream
1985	"Heat Of The Night"	–	–	Silent Scream
1989	"Touch Me Tonight"	67	–	Touch Me Tonight – The Best of Shooting Star

Promotional singles

Year	Title	Album
1979	"Bring It On"	Shooting Star
1982	"Heartache"	III Wishes
1982	"Weary Eyes"	III Wishes
1989	"Christmas Together"	Touch Me Tonight
1989	"Hollywood"	Touch Me Tonight
1991	"Believe In Me"	It's Not Over

Other popular songs

These songs received airplay on rock stations and were frequently performed live, but they were not released as singles:

Year	Title	Album
1979	"Last Chance"	Shooting Star
1979	"Tonight"	Shooting Star
1981	"Breakout"	Hang On For Your Life

Limited-edition vinyl single reissues

Year	Title
2020	"Summer Sun/When You're Young"
2020	"Flesh And Blood/Don't Walk Away"
