= Nick Ciola =

American musician

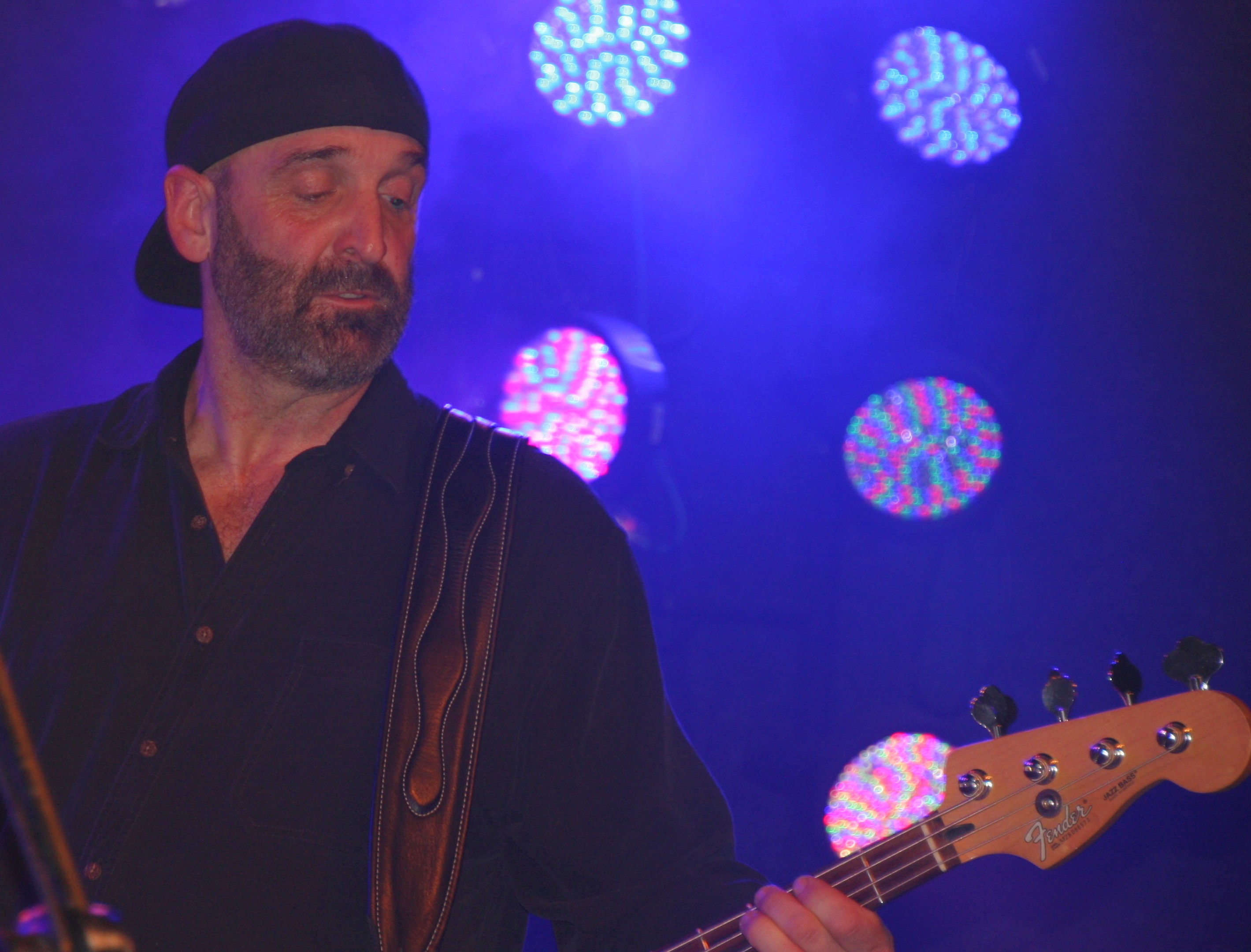
Nick Ciola playing bass guitar with the Gear Daddies in 2016

Nick Ciola (born Dominic Ciola, sometimes called Caesar) is the bass guitarist for the Gear Daddies and (former Gear Daddies frontman) Martin Zellar and the Hardways. He was born and raised in Austin, Minnesota.
