= Steel Breeze =

American rock band

Steel Breeze is an American rock group that had a US hit with the song "You Don't Want Me Anymore" in 1982. This was followed by their single "Dreamin' is Easy" the following year.

== Career ==
Taking their name from a phrase in Pink Floyd's song, "Shine On You Crazy Diamond", the six-member band from Sacramento, California comprised—in its "classic" lineup—Ric Jacobs (vocals), Ken Goorabian and Waylin Carpenter (guitars), Rod Toner (keyboards), Vinnie Pantaleoni (bass guitar), and Barry Lowenthal (drums). They released their self-titled debut album in 1982 on RCA Records. "You Don't Want Me Anymore", the first single from the album, quickly jumped into the Top 20 on the Billboard Hot 100 supported by a video that was a favorite of early MTV, and peaked at No. 16. The next single, "Dreamin' Is Easy", also made it into the Top 40 but went no higher than No. 30.

The group originally had a different lineup a few years earlier and enjoyed local success with "You Don't Want Me Anymore" with the work of manager John Wiseman before catching the attention of producer Kim Fowley and attorney David Chatfield, who recorded the band's first album at Rusk Studios in Hollywood and secured Steel Breeze their recording contract with RCA Records. On the March 12, 1983 edition of American Top 40, Casey Kasem described how Fowley discovered Steel Breeze while going through approximately 1200 demo tapes that were about to be discarded by a local Hollywood night club, Madam Wong's. Chatfield and Fowley flew to Sacramento and signed the band after Chrysalis Records executive Tom Trumbo told Chatfield he was looking for a band that sounded like Journey. Chatfield left Trumbo's office and went to Fowley's home where Fowley pulled out the Steel Breeze demo of "You Don't Want Me Anymore," which they both felt could be a hit.

The band's lineup shifted considerably after release of the debut album, with keyboardist Rod Toner remaining the longest of anyone from the early lineup days. In 1984, Steel Breeze (now with ex-707 vocalist Kevin Chalfant and keyboardist Loren Haas as members) released their second album, Heart on the Line on an independent record label. However, the record went unnoticed despite guest appearances by Bruce Springsteen's saxophonist, Clarence Clemons and Santana's vocalist, Alex Ligertwood. Five years later, a third Steel Breeze album, Cry Thunder came out with Bobby Thompson on vocals, Rick Lowe and Robbie Bickford on guitar, Toner on keyboards and Paul Ojeda on drums. In 1991, Still Warrior was released with yet another lineup, just as Chalfant had a small hit with a similar act, The Storm. In 1994, the albulm Peace Of Mind was issued.

Richard "Ric" L. Jacobs (born December 30, 1956, Moline, Illinois) died on January 17, 2018, Oakwood Hills, Illinois, at age 61.

== Discography ==
- 1982 – Steel Breeze
- 1983 – Heart on the Line
- 1989 – Cry Thunder
- 1991 – Still Warriors
- 1994 – Peace of Mind

=== Charting Singles ===
Year	Song	Charts			Album
Year	Song	US Hot 100	US Main Rock	AUS	Album
1982	"You Don't Want Me Anymore"	16	9	76	Steel Breeze
1983	"Dreamin' Is Easy"	30	—	—	Steel Breeze
