= Color of Her Eyes =

EP by Gear Daddies
- Released: 1990
- Length: 16:36
- Label: Polygram

Color of Her Eyes is a 1990 EP by the Gear Daddies. The song Color of Her Eyes is also on their full-length album Billy's Live Bait.

== Track listing ==
1. Color of Her Eyes
2. Color of Her Eyes (Acoustic)
3. The Tide Is High (Paragons cover)
4. My Maria Color
5. Party Stomp
