= Shooting Star Live =

Live album by Shooting Star
- Released: 1996
- Genre: Rock; Hard rock
- Label: V&R Distribution

Shooting Star chronology
It's Not Over (1991)	Shooting Star Live (1996)	Leap of Faith (2000)

Professional ratings
Review scores
Source	Rating
Allmusic	3/5 stars

Shooting Star Live is a live album by the group Shooting Star.

== Track listing ==
No.	Title	Writer(s)	Length
1.	"Tonight"	Van McLain, Gary West	5:10
2.	"Summer Sun"	McLain, West	4:29
3.	"We Can't Wait Forever"	Dennis Laffoon, McLain	6:03
4.	"Dancing on the Edge"	McLain, West	5:06
5.	"Hollywood"	McLain, West	4:50
6.	"Touch Me Tonight"	McLain	4:57
7.	"Compassion"	McLain	4:39
8.	"Breakout"	McLain, West	6:42
9.	"Hang on for Your Life"	McLain, West	3:44
10.	"Last Chance"	McLain, West	7:49

== Personnel ==
- Van McLain – guitars, lead vocals
- Keith Mitchell – lead vocals
- Dennis Laffoon – keyboards, vocals
- Rod Lincoln – drums
- Ron Verlin – bass
