= Zamboni (song) =

Song by Gear Daddies

from the album Billy's Live Bait
- Released: 1990
- Genre: Rock; Country rock
- Label: Polydor, Polygram
- Songwriter(s): Martin Zellar

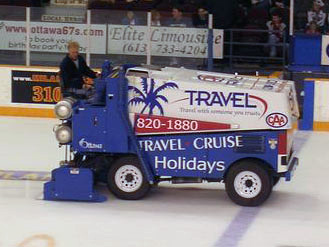
A Zamboni resurfacing the ice.

"Zamboni", also known as "I Wanna Drive the Zamboni", is a song written by Martin Zellar and recorded by his band Gear Daddies. The song tells the story of a man's desire to drive an ice resurfacer, popularly known by the brand name "Zamboni", and his request to drive the Zamboni for his local ice hockey team. Since its release, it has sometimes been played between periods at hockey games while the Zamboni cleans the ice.

It originally appeared as a hidden track on the band's 1990 CD, Billy's Live Bait.

The song also appeared on the soundtracks of three Disney movies:

- D2: The Mighty Ducks (1994)
- D3: The Mighty Ducks (1997)
- Mystery, Alaska (1999)
