= Billy Dankert =

American drummer

James "Billy" Dankert is an American musician from Austin, Minnesota, United States, best known as the drummer, singer and songwriter for Minnesota-based band the Gear Daddies. Dankert's songs include "Time Heals", "Blues Mary", and "One Voice". After the break-up of the band in 1992, he returned to school to study Classical languages and literature. He has released six solo albums: Bowling Shoes Blues on the Crackpot Records label in 1993; The Vanishing Head on the Veto Records label in 2001; and In Spite on the Veto Records label in 2003. A fourth solo album, The Past Is Not Complete, was recorded in 2005, tracks recently released online-only. Sleep Late in 2015, and All Eight in 2024.

Dankert now resides in St. Paul, Minnesota, playing reunion gigs with the Gear Daddies. He has drummed for several other acts like Slim Dunlap, Shimmy, and Doug Collins and the Receptionists, Institutional Green, and The Reverend Angus Strychn Trio. He is also a successful freelance artist.
