= Martin Zellar and the Hardways =

Studio album by Martin Zellar
- Released: 1996
- Label: Rykodisc
- Producer: Tom Herbers

Martin Zellar chronology
Born Under (1995)	Martin Zellar and the Hardways (1996)	The Many Moods of Martin Zellar and the Hardways (1998)

Martin Zellar and the Hardways is an album by Martin Zellar, released in 1996. He is credited with his band, the Hardways. Zellar supported the album with a North American tour. The first single was "I Can't Believe".

== Production ==
The album was produced by Tom Herbers. Zellar included several faster songs, with a mind toward his live show. "Big Sandals" is about the cohort who followed the Baby boomers but who don't identify as Generation X. "Guilty Just the Same" is about a death row inmate. Inspired by a friend of Zellar's, "Ten-Year Coin" depicts an alcoholic who falls off the wagon. "Haunt My Dreams" describes an infatuation with a younger woman. "Lullaby" is about a father and his newborn. "Frog Fightin' Drunk" is an unlisted bonus track.

== Critical reception ==
Professional ratings
Review scores
Source	Rating
AllMusic	3/5 stars
Calgary Herald	4/5 stars
Lincoln Journal Star	4/5 stars
MusicHound Rock: The Essential Album Guide	4/5 stars
The Province	3.5/5 stars
The Republican	2.5/5 stars

The Lincoln Journal Star wrote that the Hardways "are along for the ride and their stage chemistry transfers effectively into the studio, providing a more cohesive sound and near-perfect backing for Zellar's explorations on the street of broken dreams." No Depression concluded that, "for the second album in a row, Zellar seems incapable of writing a memorable melody, relying on a simple, easygoing roots-rock sound to cover up any real musical inspiration." The Milwaukee Journal Sentinel noted that "the underappreciated Minnesotan has focused on the gap between the heady promise of youth and the harsh realities of adulthood."

The Chicago Tribune deemed the album "a striking collection of musical vignettes graced with vivid storytelling and an unvarnished yet indelible lyricism." The Dallas Observer stated that "Zellar addresses us from the heart of the everyday—that territory defined by a line of empty beer bottles on the bar, the job in town, the snowplow blade rusting in the barn, and the whitewashed halves of old tractor tires between the mums and the driveway." The Province labeled Zellar "an accomplished songwriter who'll find an audience among admirers of John Hiatt or Paul Kelly." The Arkansas Democrat-Gazette dismissed Zellar as "a Springsteen clone."

== Track listing ==
No.	Title	Length
1.	"Haunt My Dreams"
2.	"Ten-Year Coin"
3.	"Brown-Eyed Boy"
4.	"I Can't Believe"
5.	"Hammer's Gonna Fall"
6.	"George and Tammy"
7.	"Lullaby"
8.	"Big Sandals"
9.	"Guilty Just the Same"
10.	"We Were Young"
