= It's Not Over (Shooting Star album) =

Album by Shooting Star

Studio album by Shooting Star
- Released: February 5, 1991
- Recorded: V&R Studios
- Genre: Rock; Hard rock
- Label: BMG
- Producer: Van McLain

Shooting Star chronology
Shooting Star/Hang On for Your Life (1991)	It's Not Over (1991)	Shooting Star Live (1996)

Professional ratings
Review scores
Source	Rating
Allmusic	3/5 stars

It's Not Over is the sixth album by the group Shooting Star. This is the first Shooting Star album not to feature founding members Gary West, Steve Thomas, and Charles Waltz; and the first to feature their replacements: vocalist Keith Mitchell, keyboardist Dennis Laffoon, and drummer Rod Lincoln. It is also the first Shooting Star album to feature original bassist Ron Verlin since 1983's Burning.

== Track listing ==
All songs written by Van McLain, except 3, written by McLain and Dennis Laffoon, and tracks 5, 7, and 9, written by McLain and Gary West.

No.	Title	Writer(s)	Length
1.	"It's Not Over"	Van McLain
2.	"Believe in Me"	McLain
3.	"We Can't Wait Forever"	Dennis Laffoon, McLain
4.	"Rebel with a Cause"	McLain
5.	"Dancing on the Edge"	McLain, Gary West
6.	"If You've Got Love"	McLain
7.	"Blame It on the Night"	McLain, West
8.	"Get Excited"	McLain
9.	"Cold Blooded"	McLain, West
10.	"Compassion"	McLain

== Personnel ==
- Keith Mitchell – lead vocals
- Van McLain – guitars, backing vocals
- Dennis Laffoon – keyboards, backing vocals
- Ron Verlin – bass
- Rod Lincoln – drums
