= Silent Scream (album) =

Studio album by Shooting Star
- Released: April 15, 1985
- Recorded: Townhouse London; Studio West, Kansas City; The Plant, Sausalito, California; Record One. Los Angeles; The Complex, Los Angeles; Indigo Ranch Malibu, California
- Genre: Rock; Hard rock
- Label: Virgin Records
- Producer: Ron Nevison

Shooting Star chronology
Burning (1983)	Silent Scream (1985)	Best of Shooting Star (1989)

Professional ratings
Review scores
Source	Rating
AllMusic	3/5 stars

Silent Scream is the fifth album by the group Shooting Star. It was produced by Ron Nevison, though the band's guitarist, Van McLain, said in a 2003 interview with Classic Rock Revisited that the band had a falling out with Nevison and fired him in the middle of recording, with the album's recording engineer, Greg Ladanyi, stepping up to finish it. It is the last Shooting Star album to date to feature founding members Gary West and Charles Waltz (who didn't return to the band following its resurrection in 1989), and the last album to feature drummer Steve Thomas until 2006's Circles. It was also the only Shooting Star release to date not to feature bassist Ron Verlin until 2015's Into the Night, and the band's lone album to feature Norm Dahlor on bass.

== Track listing ==
All tracks are written by Van McLain and Gary West.

No.	Title	Length
1.	"Summer Sun"
2.	"Somewhere In Your Heart"
3.	"Heat of the Night"
4.	"When You're Young"
5.	"In Her Eyes"
6.	"I'm Getting Out"
7.	"Don't Walk Away"
8.	"Time"
9.	"Little By Little"
10.	"Don't Stop Me Now"
11.	"Get Ready Boy"
12.	"Take It"
13.	"Get Ready Boy (alternate mix)"

== Personnel ==
- Van McLain – guitars, lead vocals
- Gary West – lead vocals, guitars, keyboards
- Norm Dahlor – bass
- Steve Thomas – drums
- Charles Waltz – violin, keyboards, vocals
