= Leap of Faith (Shooting Star album) =

Studio album by Shooting Star
- Released: July 11, 2000
- Recorded: V&R Studios
- Genre: Rock; Hard rock
- Label: BMG
- Producer: Kevin Beamish

Shooting Star chronology
Shooting Star Live (1996)	Leap of Faith (2000)	Circles (2006)

Professional ratings
Review scores
Source	Rating
AllMusic	3/5 stars

Leap of Faith is the seventh album by the group Shooting Star. It is the last Shooting Star album to feature vocalist Keith Mitchell and drummer Rod Lincoln; as well as the only album to feature violinist Christian Howes. Two versions of the CD were released, one with bonus tracks and a different order of the tracks.

== Track listing ==
No.	Title	Writer(s)	Length
1.	"I Just Wanna Rock"	Van McLain, Keith Mitchell
2.	"I Need Your Touch"	McLain
3.	"If You Want It"	McLain, Gary West
4.	"Leap of Faith"	McLain
5.	"She Drives Me Crazy"	McLain
6.	"Face to Face"	McLain, West
7.	"Hungry Eyes"	McLain, West
8.	"Love is a Shield"	McLain
9.	"Promises"	McLain, West
10.	"Call it Love"	Dennis Laffoon, Mitchell
11.	"Find a Way"	McLain
12.	"Higher Power"	McLain

== Bonus Track listing ==
No.	Title	Writer(s)	Length
1.	"Lets Roll [Bonus Track]"	McLain
2.	"I Need Your Touch"	McLain
3.	"If You Want It"	McLain, Gary West
4.	"Leap of Faith"	McLain
5.	"Face to Face"	McLain, West
6.	"Promises"	McLain, West
7.	"Don't Walk Away [Bonus Track]"	McLain
8.	"Love is a Shield"	McLain
9.	"Hungry Eyes"	McLain, West
10.	"Find a Way"	McLain
11.	"Call it Love"	Dennis Laffoon, Mitchell
12.	"She Drives Me Crazy"	McLain
13.	"Higher Power"	McLain
14.	"I Just Wanna Rock"	Keith Mitchell, Dennis Laffoon

== Personnel ==
- Van McLain – guitars, lead and backing vocals
- Keith Mitchell – lead and backing vocals
- Christian Howes – violin
- Dennis Laffoon – keyboards, backing vocals
- Rod Lincoln – drums
- Ron Verlin – bass

Additional personnel

- Kevin Beamish – backing vocals
- Gary Charlsen – backing vocals
