= Let's Go Scare Al =

Studio album by Gear Daddies
- Released: 1988
- Label: Gark

Gear Daddies chronology
Let's Go Scare Al (1988)	Billy's Live Bait (1990)

Let's Go Scare Al is the first album by the American band Gear Daddies. The album was released in 1988 on the Gark record label, and re-released in 1990 on Polygram Records.

== Critical reception ==
Professional ratings
Review scores
Source	Rating
AllMusic	3/5 stars
Entertainment Weekly	A–
Select	3/5 medals

The Chicago Tribune deemed the album "scary stuff indeed, filled with all the painful feelings that come from not fitting in, trying to be cool and acting like a jerk instead, and being used and abused by those closest to you." In 1999, the St. Cloud Times wrote that it "wonderfully combines the ups and downs of small-town living with a good-time country bar sound."

== Track listing ==
1. Cut Me Off
2. Statue of Jesus
3. Boys Will Be Boys
4. Don't Forget Me
5. Heavy Metal Böyz
6. Drank So Much (Just Feel Stupid)
7. She's Happy
8. Blues Mary
9. This Time
10. Strength

== Personnel ==
- Randy Broughten: guitar, pedal steel guitar, dobro
- Nick Ciola: bass
- Billy Dankert: drums, piano, vocals
- Martin Zellar: guitar, harmonica, vocals
