= Martin Zellar =

American singer-songwriter

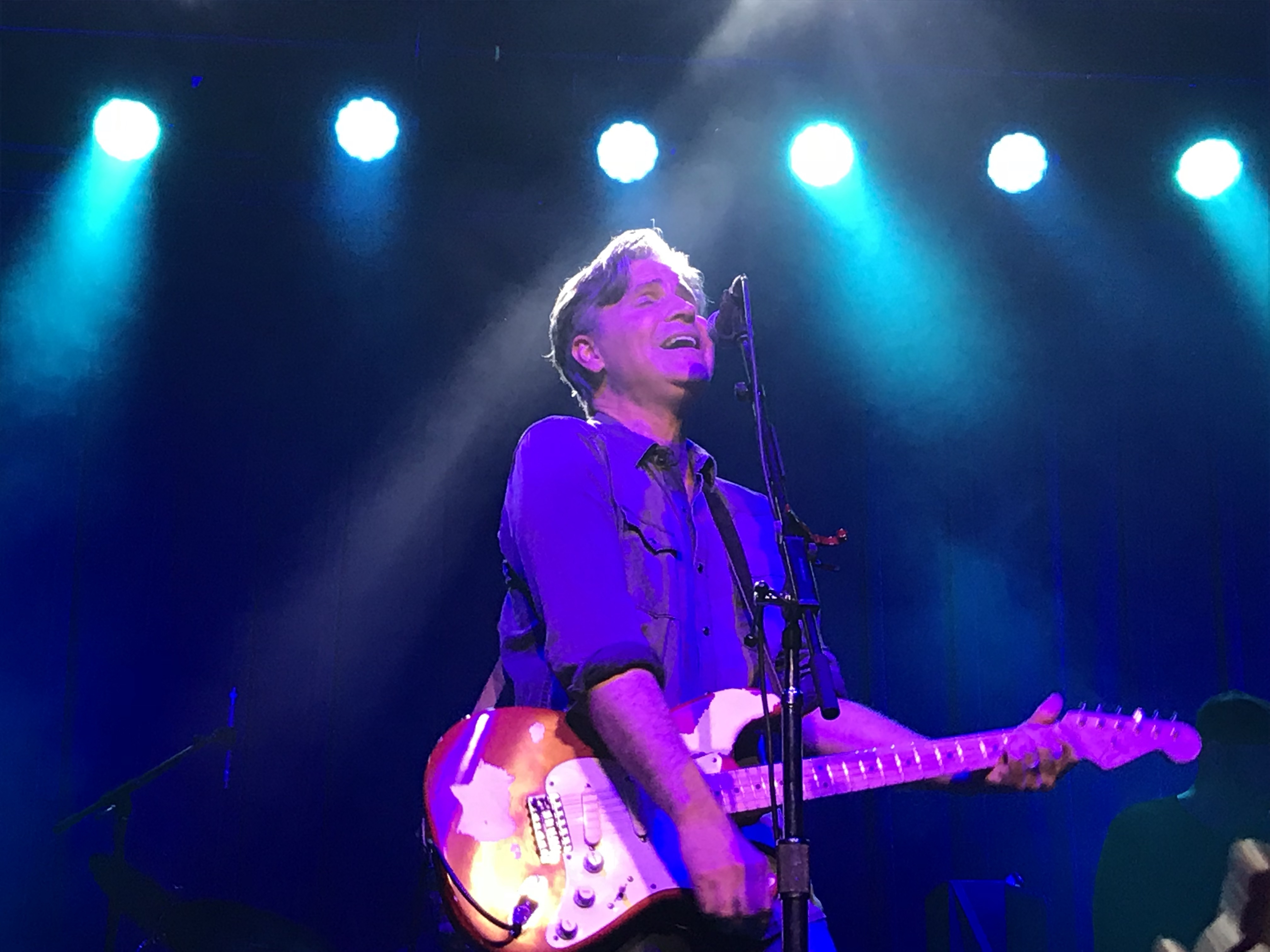
- Martin Zellar in Minneapolis, 2018

Background information
- Born: Austin, Minnesota
- Genres: Rock, country, Americana, alternative country
- Occupation: Singer-songwriter
- Instruments: Vocals, guitar, harmonica
- Years active: 1979–present
- Member of: Gear Daddies, Martin Zellar & The Hardways, Neil!
- Website: www.martinzellar.com

Martin Lee Zellar (born June 14, 1963) is a Minnesota-based musician and songwriter. Martin Zellar is the brother of writer Brad Zellar.

== Early career ==
Zellar grew up in Austin, Minnesota. While still in high school, Zellar formed his first band, Fallout, with childhood friend and bassist Nick Ciola. Zellar and Ciola have played in bands together for more than 30 years. In the mid-1980s, he was a member of the Take It to the Limit Band, which would become the supergroup Golden Smog.

== Gear Daddies ==
Upon graduation, Zellar moved to the Twin Cities and in 1984 joined fellow Austin, Minnesotans Ciola, guitarist Randy Broughten, and drummer and fellow songwriter James "Billy" Dankert as the Gear Daddies. The band enjoyed much regional and some national success, and released three albums. They officially broke up in 1992, but began playing enthusiastically attended reunion shows a few years later.

== Solo Career and Hardways ==
With the dissolution of the Gear Daddies, the songwriter began making albums and performing with a band that would become known as Martin Zellar and The Hardways, including at various times Nick Ciola, Scott Wenum, Wilson Zellar, Jesse Duke, Luke Kramer, Whelan Keenan, Dan Neale, Adam Levy, Noah Levy, Jon Duncan, Marc Retish, Patrik Tanner, and Randy Broughten.

== Other projects ==
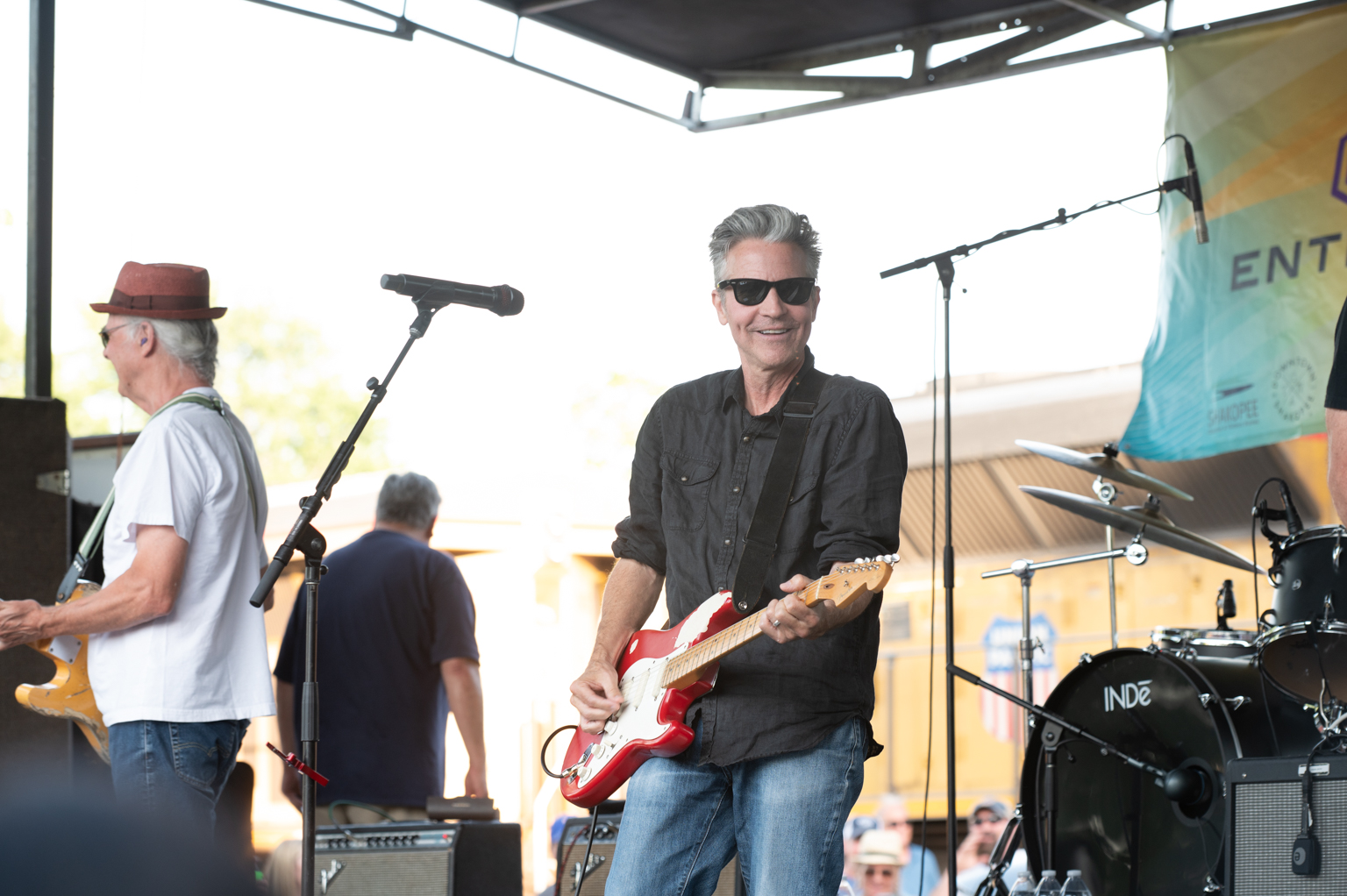
Martin Zellar at Rhythm on the Rails in Shakopee, MN on June 29, 2022

In the late '90s, Zellar began singing with a Neil Diamond tribute band that remains popular into the present. Neil! includes musicians Ali Gray, Patrik Tanner, Scott Wenum, Nick Ciola, and JJ Benson.

In 2007, Zellar's song I Wanna Drive the Zamboni, which appears in various movies and television shows, and is ubiquitous at hockey games, was released as a single. The song was originally a hidden track on the Gear Daddies album "Billy's Live Bait".

On February 10, 2012 Martin Zellar and the Hardways kicked off a tour in support of new album Rooster's Crow. Pat Maske produced, and it includes the talents of Kelly Willis, Lloyd Maines, Kevin McKinney, Bukka Allen (Bodeans), Chojo Jacques, Brian Standefer (Alejandro Escovedo), Billy Bright (Peter Rowan), Michael Ramos (John Mellencamp), and Terri Hendrix. Chris Riemenschneider of the Minneapolis StarTribune calls it "the best record of his 25-year career."

== Discography ==
=== With the Gear Daddies ===
- 1988: Let's Go Scare Al (Steve's Pizza Music, BMI),
- 1990: Billy's Live Bait (Polygram)
- 1992: Can't Have Nothin' Nice (Crackpot)

=== With the Hardways ===
- 1995: Born Under (Rykodisc)
- 1996: Martin Zellar and the Hardways (Rykodisc)
- 1998: The Many Moods of Martin Zellar and the Hardways (Owen Lee Recordings)
- 2000: Two Guitars Bass & Drums (Owen Lee Recordings), recorded live
- 2002: Scattered (Owen Lee Recordings)
- 2003: Live From the Mercury Lounge (Legal Bootleg)
- 2003: They Even Use The Hooves (Owen Lee Recordings), B-sides and other rarities
- 2011: Martin Lee Zellar (Owen Lee Recordings), limited edition
- 2012: Rooster's Crow (Owen Lee Recordings)
- 2017: Fan-Selected Sampler 1998–2014 (Owen Lee Recordings)
- 2023: Head West (Owen Lee Recordings)
