= Born Under =

Studio album by Martin Zellar
- Released: 1995
- Genre: Country rock
- Label: Rykodisc
- Producer: Martin Zellar, Steve McKinstry

Martin Zellar chronology
Born Under (1995)	Martin Zellar and the Hardways (1996)

Born Under is the debut album by the American musician Martin Zellar, released in 1995. Its first two singles were "Lie to Me" and "Problem Solved". The album was rereleased, with bonus tracks, in 2004.

== Production ==
Recorded in Northfield, Minnesota, the album was produced by Zellar and Steve McKinstry. Soul Asylum's Dan Murphy played guitar on "Lie to Me". Many of the songs were inspired by Zellar's wife and son. The album cover photo was shot in Grand Forks, North Dakota.

== Critical reception ==
Professional ratings
Review scores
Source	Rating
AllMusic	4/5 stars
MusicHound Rock: The Essential Album Guide	4/5 stars
The Republican	2.5/5 stars
The State	5/5 stars

Trouser Press stated that "Zellar has a grit-strewn voice with a mannered catch better suited to the harsh honesty of his lyrics than the placid curves of his melodies." The Chicago Reader wrote that the album's "not the sort of recording that's going to perk up your next party, but it is exactly what a lot of people say there isn't much of these days: adult, smart, perceptive, and emotionally genuine rock music." The Milwaukee Journal determined that "Zellar's nasal, angular voice is a ragged standout here against all manner of plaintive backing, from lonesome guitar pings and mournful cello drones to swoopy organ fills."

Stereo Review deemed Born Under "as moving a piece of confessional pop as you're likely to see these days, a tuneful, lovely-on-the-surface song cycle of reflective country-rock musings that only barely conceal some rather world-class emotional turmoil beneath." The Santa Fe New Mexican noted that on some songs Zellar "sings in the voice of a drunken lout, albeit a drunken lout with a conscience that is only slightly weaker than the demons who hold him down." The Los Angeles Times declared that Zellar "writes blue-collar tales about hard times and hard lessons that are reminiscent of the eloquence of the Blasters in their prime."

AllMusic panned Zellar's vocals, but also wrote that "twangy roadhouse rock alternates with unabashed honky-tonk balladry, and real-life working class concerns dominate the lyrics."

== Track listing ==
No.	Title	Length
1.	"Lie to Me"
2.	"Something's Gotta Happen"
3.	"East Side Boys"
4.	"Falling Sky"
5.	"Problem Solved"
6.	"Cross My Heart"
7.	"Lay This Down Gently"
8.	"Summer Kind of Sad"
9.	"Force a Smile"
10.	"Let Go"
