= You Don't Want Me Anymore =

1982 single by Steel Breeze

Single by Steel Breeze

from the album Steel Breeze
- B-side: "Every Night", Who's Gonna Love You Tonight"
- Released: 1982
- Genre: Dance-rock
- Length: 3:27
- Label: RCA
- Songwriter: Ken Goorabian
- Producer: Kim Fowley

Steel Breeze singles chronology
"You Don't Want Me Anymore" (1982)	"Dreamin' Is Easy" (1982)

Music video
- "You Don't Want Me Anymore" on YouTube

"You Don't Want Me Anymore" is a 1982 song by Steel Breeze from their self-titled debut album. The song was released as a single in the United States and made it to number 16 on the Billboard Hot 100 singles chart.

== Background ==
"You Don’t Want Me Anymore" was aided by a memorable video that was a hit on early MTV. It was also the last chart single ever produced by Kim Fowley.

== Chart performance ==
Chart (1982–83)	Peak position
US Billboard Hot 100	16
