= Steel Breeze (album) =

Studio album by Steel Breeze
- Released: August 24, 1982
- Recorded: 1982
- Genre: Rock; pop
- Length: 37:47
- Label: RCA; Renaissance
- Producer: Kim Fowley

Steel Breeze chronology
Steel Breeze (1982)	Heart on the Line (1983)

Professional ratings
Review scores
Source	Rating
Allmusic	4.5/5 stars

Steel Breeze is the self-titled debut album by the group Steel Breeze released by RCA Records in 1982. "You Don't Want Me Anymore," the first single from the album, entered the Top 20 on the US Billboard Hot 100.

== Track listing ==
All songs were written by Ken Goorabian, except where noted.

No.	Title	Writer(s)	Length
1.	"You Don't Want Me Anymore"		3:27
2.	"Lost in the 80's"		4:34
3.	"I Think About You"		3:37
4.	"All I Ever Wanted to Do"		3:16
5.	"Dreamin' is Easy"		3:36
6.	"Every Night"	Goorabian, Carpenter	5:00
7.	"I Can't Wait"		3:14
8.	"Who's Gonna Love You Tonight"		3:22
9.	"Can't Stop This Feeling"		4:29
10.	"Street Talkin'"		3:16

== Personnel ==
- Rick Jacobs – Vocals
- Ken Goorabian – Guitar, Vocals
- Waylin Carpenter – Lead guitars
- Vinnie Pantaleoni – Bass, Vocals
- Rod Toner – Keyboards
- Barry Lowenthal – Drums

== Chart positions ==
Album – Billboard (United States)

Year	Chart	Position
1982	The Billboard 200	50

Single – Billboard (United States)

Year	Single	Chart	Position
1982	"You Don't Want Me Anymore"	The Billboard Hot 100	16
1982	"You Don't Want Me Anymore"	Mainstream Rock	9
1983	"Dreamin' Is Easy"	The Billboard Hot 100	30
