= Six Mile Grove =

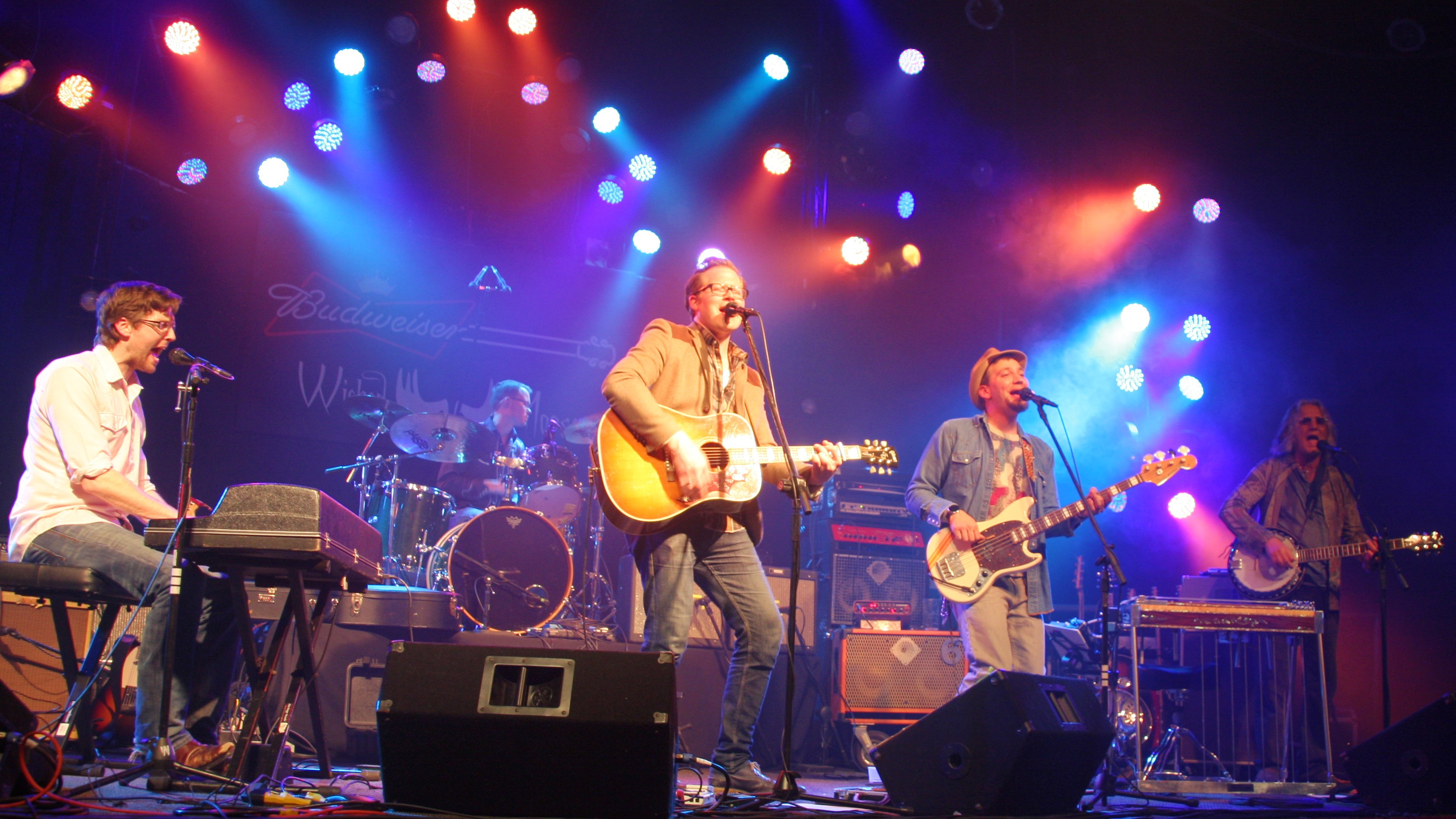

Background information
- Genres: Americana, alternative country
- Years active: 1997–present
- Members: Brandon Sampson; Brian Sampson; John Wheeler; Dezi Wallace

Six Mile Grove is a five-piece alternative country band based in Rochester, Minnesota.

== Biography ==
Six Mile Grove was founded in 1997 in Lyle, Minnesota (population 566) by brothers Brandon and Brian Sampson, Barry Nelson and Dezi Wallace. Their first rehearsals were held in the Sampsons' grandmother's farm home. The group is known for an Americana/alt-country/roots rock sound.

In 2004 they began a collaboration with Johnny Cash guitarist Bob Wootton. In a 2011 interview, Wootton stated, "There's nothing fancy about them and they don't try to be something they're not. And that's what I like about them."

In 2012 Six Mile Grove released their sixth studio album, Secret Life in a Quiet Town.

== Members ==
- Brandon Sampson - Lead vocals, rhythm guitar, and harmonica
- Barry Nelson - Backing vocals, Wurlitzer, Hammond Organ, piano and lead guitar
- Dezi Wallace - Bass guitar, banjo, and mandolin
- Brian Sampson - Drums and percussion
- John Wheeler - Pedal steel, dobro, accordion

== Studio albums ==
- A Day's Work (1997)
- Long Distance Everything (1998)
- Friction (2000)
- Bumper Crop (2004)
- Steel Mule (2008)
- Secret Life in a Quiet Town (2012)
- Million Birds (2018)

== Live albums ==
- Live from the Rochester Civic Theatre (2010)

== Awards ==
- "Vs. The World" Ranked #4 by Roots Highway Radio (Italy)
- "Later On" Ranked #19 by Roots Highway Radio (Italy)
- "Bumper Crop" Ranked #21 by American Roots Music Top 100 Chart
- "Bumper Crop" Ranked #26 by Freeform American Roots Chart
- "Man of Steel" Ranked #2 by Moxie Radio Top 20 Chart
