= The Storm (American band) =

American rock band

- Origin: San Francisco, California
- Genres: Melodic rock; pop rock; hard rock
- Years active: 1990–1993; 1995–1996
- Labels: Interscope; Music for Nations
- Spinoff of: Journey
- Past members: Gregg Rolie; Kevin Chalfant; Ross Valory; Steve Smith; Josh Ramos; Ron Wikso

The Storm was an American supergroup rock band, formed in the Bay Area of San Francisco during the early 1990s. The band's first single, power ballad "I've Got a Lot to Learn About Love", peaked at No. 6 on the Mainstream Rock Tracks chart and No. 26 on the Billboard Hot 100.

The band had three of Journey's former members, two of whom were founding members: Gregg Rolie (original lead vocalist and keyboard player of Journey) on keyboards and lead and backing vocals, Ross Valory on bass guitar and backing vocals, and Steve Smith on drums. Kevin Chalfant, who had a No. 12 rock chart hit in 1982 as lead vocalist with AOR band 707, was the lead vocalist, and Josh Ramos, who cited the Journey founder and guitarist Neal Schon as a major influence, was the lead guitarist.

== History ==
=== 1990–1991: formation ===
Chalfant and Valory had just released an album together on another side-project band called The V.U. and were ready for another venture. However, Rolie was the most instrumental in bringing the band together and sending them into a climb of success. He had collaborated on material with Kevin Chalfant and sent the track "Show Me the Way" to the producer Beau Hill who, with Jimmy Iovine, had just started Interscope Records as a hard rock/AOR label for the Atlantic Records president Doug Morris. Interscope became seriously interested in the project and signed the band, now known as the Storm, in 1990.

=== 1991–1992: The Storm and Smith's departure ===
The Storm's first album, The Storm, produced by Beau Hill, was released in 1991 by Interscope. It reached No. 133 on the Billboard album chart, with two mainstream rock radio hits with the No. 6 "I’ve Got a Lot to Learn About Love" (which also reached No. 26 on the Billboard Hot 100) and the No. 22 "Show Me the Way". Smith left the band in late 1991 and was replaced by Ron Wikso, who left Cher's band to become a full member of the Storm in early 1992.

In March 1992, the band embarked upon a US tour supporting Bryan Adams in arenas. That was followed with a tour supporting Peter Frampton and additional dates with Eddie Money, Tom Cochrane and others, in addition to several headlining dates.

=== 1992–1993: Dissolution and aftermath ===
A second album, Eye of the Storm, was recorded for Interscope Records in 1993 but never released by Interscope. The previous year, the label — founded by Iovine (a producer, who began his career as a sound engineer for John Lennon and Bruce Springsteen) and Hill (noted for his success producing the hard rock bands Ratt and Winger) as a rock label — had struck a deal to distribute releases by Death Row Records. Hits by Dr. Dre and Snoop Dogg convinced the label to shift its focus from mainstream rock to gangsta rap. Eye of the Storm was eventually issued by the UK independent label Music for Nations in Europe, Avex Trax (Bareknuckle) in Japan and Miramar Records in the US. The album also appears on the iTunes Music Store with the release date of 1995.

Despite the eventual release of Eye of the Storm, the individual band members had moved on to other things. Rolie played briefly with Abraxas Pool (with most of the original Santana members – himself, Chepito Areas, Michael Carabello and Michael Shrieve – as well as Neal Schon and Alphonso Johnson), before embarking on a solo career and subsequently joining Ringo Starr in his All Starr Band. Valory and Smith went on to a reformed Journey. Wikso went on to play with David Lee Roth, Foreigner, Richie Sambora, Gregg Rolie, Eddie Money, Creedence Clearwater Revisited and the Steve Miller Band, among others. Chalfant, who sounded very much like Perry, worked briefly with the reformed Journey, but was eventually replaced by Perry himself. Chalfant and Ramos formed another band called Two Fires, which released three albums, and later pursued solo careers, Chalfant singing lead vocal in The Alan Parsons Project and the Kansas City AOR-based band Shooting Star.

In late 1999, Rolie and Wikso co-produced a solo album for Rolie called Roots, released in 2001 by 33rd Street Records in the US and Sanctuary Records in Europe, and have since toured together as part of the Gregg Rolie Band. This group also includes Michael Carabello, Adrian Areas, Kurt Griffey, Alphonso Johnson and Wally Minko. Wikso occasionally works with REO Speedwagon guitarist Dave Amato and Styx bass guitarist Ricky Phillips.

== Band members ==
Final line-up

- Kevin Chalfant – lead vocals, acoustic guitars (1990–1993, 1995–1996)
- Josh Ramos – lead, rhythm and acoustic guitars (1990–1993, 1995–1996)
- Gregg Rolie – keyboards, backing and lead vocals (1990–1993, 1995–1996)
- Ross Valory – bass guitar, backing vocals (1990–1993, 1995–1996)
- Ron Wikso – drums (1992–1993, 1995–1996)

Former

- Steve Smith – drums (1990–1991)

== Discography ==
Year	Title	Billboard peak	Label
1991	The Storm	133	Interscope
1995	Eye of The Storm	—N/a	Music For Nations
