= Burning (album) =

Studio album by Shooting Star
- Released: June 3, 1983
- Recorded: Fantasy Studios
- Genre: Rock; Hard rock
- Label: Virgin Records
- Producer: Kevin Elson

Shooting Star chronology
III Wishes (1982)	Burning (1983)	Silent Scream (1985)

Professional ratings
Review scores
Source	Rating
AllMusic	3/5 stars

Burning is the fourth album by the group Shooting Star. It was the final album with founding bassist Ron Verlin (who departed the band in 1984) until 1991's It's Not Over.

== Track listing ==
All tracks are written by Van McLain and Gary West (except where noted).

No.	Title	Length
1.	"Preview"
2.	"Straight Ahead"
3.	"Taken Enough"
4.	"Go for It"
5.	"Burning"
6.	"Winner"
7.	"Reach Out I'll Be There" (Holland-Dozier-Holland arr. McLain and West)
8.	"Train Rolls On"
9.	"Dreams"
10.	"Reckless"
11.	"Theme"

== Personnel ==
- Van McLain – guitars, lead vocals
- Gary West – lead vocals, guitars, keyboards
- Steve Thomas – drums
- Ron Verlin – bass
- Charles Waltz – violin, keyboards, vocals
