= III Wishes =

Studio album by Shooting Star
- Released: July 9, 1982
- Recorded: Caribou Ranch
- Genre: Rock; Hard rock
- Label: Virgin Records
- Producer: Kevin Elson

Shooting Star chronology
Hang On for Your Life (1981)	III Wishes (1982)	Burning (1983)

Professional ratings
Review scores
Source	Rating
AllMusic	3/5 stars
Sounds	3/5 stars

III Wishes is the third album by the group Shooting Star. This is the band's first album without keyboardist Bill Guffey, who had departed from the band the previous year.

== Track listing ==
All tracks are written by Van McLain and Gary West (except where noted).

No.	Title	Length
1.	"Are You Ready"	3:14
2.	"Standing in the Light"	4:06
3.	"Heartache"	3:53
4.	"Where You Gonna Run"	3:54
5.	"Do You Feel Alright"	3:48
6.	"Turn It On"	2:59
7.	"Weary Eyes"	4:14
8.	"Couldn't Get Enough"	4:13
9.	"Let It Out"	3:21
10.	"Whole World's Watching" (Michael Brown, McLain, West)	4:04

== Personnel ==
- Gary West – lead and backing vocals, keyboards, guitars
- Charles Waltz – violin, keyboards, backing and lead vocals
- Van McLain – lead guitar, lead and backing vocals
- Steve Thomas – drums
- Ron Verlin – bass
