= 707 (band) =

American rock band

- Origin: Livonia, Michigan, United States
- Genres: Rock, hard rock, pop rock
- Years active: 1977–1983, 2000–present
- Labels: Casablanca, Boardwalk Records, MTM Music & Publishing, Bedrock, GB Music
- Members: Kevin Russell; Lewis
- Past members: Kevin Chalfant; Phil Bryant; Jim McClarty; Duke McFadden; Andy Celley; Tod Howarth

707 was an American rock band of the early 1980s, best known for the rock radio hits "I Could Be Good For You" and "Mega Force".

== "I Could Be Good for You" ==
The original members included Phil Bryant (bass, vocals), Jim McClarty (drums), Duke McFadden (keyboards/synthesizers, vocals) and Kevin Russell (guitars, vocals). Initially signed to Casablanca Records, they achieved significant rock radio airplay with "I Could Be Good for You", written by McFadden and McClarty. It peaked at No. 52 on the Billboard Hot 100. The song was featured on their first album, simply entitled 707. McFadden left the band before their second album. "I Could Be Good For You" was later included in the Adam Sandler film Grown Ups.

== The Second Album ==
Before the second album's recording in 1980, singer/keyboardist Duke McFadden quit the lineup and the band brought in session keyboardist Andy Celley to finish the record. "Strings Around My Heart" failed to repeat their first single's success, but that did not stop The Second Album from hitting the charts, peaking at No. 159 in the Billboard 200 in 1981. Recording sessions began for a third album, The Bridge, featuring the addition of keyboardist/guitarist Tod Howarth. While being musically inventive and clearly demonstrating Howarth's influence, the recordings languished unreleased for 18 years due to contract disputes.

During 1981, 707 performed "Tonite's Your Night" on The Midnight Special.

== The Bridge ==
The third 707 album was recorded in 1981 after completing a tour together opening for REO Speedwagon. The line-up was Kevin Russell (vocals/guitar), Phil Bryant (vocals/bass), Jim McClarty (drums/backing vocals) and Todd Howarth (keys/guitar/backing vocals). The album was shelved until it was finally released in 2004.

== Mega Force ==
The band departed Casablanca, and signed with Boardwalk Records, re-joining Bruce Bird and Neil Bogart, who had originally signed the band to Casablanca. In the tradition of other successful bands of the 1960s (The Beatles) and 1970s (Styx, Journey), 707 did not have a single lead vocalist, and featured different band members taking lead vocals on different tracks; some songs even featured different vocalists within the same song. The label decided that 707 needed a single, distinguishable vocal front man, and Kevin Chalfant was added to the Mega Force lineup to take that role.

The result of those changes was the band's most successful album, Mega Force. The album peaked at No. 129 in 1982. The title track, originally recorded as the theme to the motion picture Megaforce, repeated the success of their first hit, reaching No. 12 on Billboard's Mainstream Rock charts and rising to No. 62 on the Hot 100.

But a discouraged Bryant also quit 707 after the recording of Mega Force, and the band brought in former Angel bassist Felix Robinson and played for stadium crowds as the opening act for several successful acts at their commercial peak, including Ted Nugent, Loverboy, Scorpions, Rainbow and REO Speedwagon's tour in support of their album Good Trouble. Despite that success, the group disbanded in 1983 due to internal strife within the band.

== Other work ==
Chalfant later enjoyed some success in the early 1990s with The Storm. After a hiatus from music in the mid-1990s, he has remained active in solo and group projects, and has stepped in as temporary lead vocalist for Journey (1993) and The Alan Parsons Project (2003).

Tod Howarth enjoyed success with Kiss guitarist Ace Frehley's solo outing which re-wrote "Mega Force" with Jonathan Cain's writing credit removed and Frehley's added. They titled the song "Calling To You" since Ace did not want to use the name Megaforce since he was signed to Megaforce Records. Howarth had stints in Ted Nugent's band, his own solo career, and as a longtime touring keyboardist for Cheap Trick.

Kevin Russell fashioned a successful career as a record producer and guitarist for numerous acts, including Rick Derringer, Clarence Clemons, and Whitesnake.

After parting from 707, Jim McClarty worked in television and audio production before devoting himself to the ministry. He is currently a Sovereign Grace pastor near Nashville, Tennessee. In 2006 he returned to his 707 roots, mastering the band's album The Fourth Decade for Renaissance Records.

Duke McFadden died on April 5, 2005, from heart complications.

In 2000, 707 regrouped briefly around guitarist Russell and independent record label releases have featured early demos, live tracks, and new material, as well as CD re-releases of their 1980s albums.

== Discography ==
Year	Album	Label
1980	707	Casablanca
1981	The Second Album	Casablanca (US No. 159)
1982	Mega Force	Boardwalk (US No. 129)
2000	Trip to Heaven	Bedrock
2004	The Bridge	MTM Music & Publish (2004); Renaissance (2006 re-release)
2005	Greatest Hits Live	Renaissance
2006	The Fourth Decade	Renaissance
2006	Magic	Renaissance
