= Corey Stevens =

American blues guitarist

Corey Stevens (born August 6, 1954) is an American blues guitarist from Centralia, Illinois, United States.

== Biography ==
Stevens began playing guitar at age 11 and moved to Los Angeles after graduating from Southern Illinois University at Carbondale, to pursue a career in the music business. Stevens worked as a school teacher for the Los Angeles Unified School District for ten years before signing a recording contract with the independent label, Eureka Records. He released his debut album in 1995, garnering comparisons to Stevie Ray Vaughan and Eric Clapton, and scored a rock radio hit with the single, "Blue Drops of Rain." "One More Time" from his 1997 follow up, Road To Zen, was his highest charting single. It reached the top ten in Radio & Records and number 22 on the Billboard Mainstream Rock chart.

== Discography ==
=== Albums/CDs ===
- Blue Drops of Rain (Eureka/Discovery, 1995) U.S. Blues number 7
- Road to Zen (Eureka/Discovery, 1997) U.S. Blues number 4
- Getaway (Eureka, 2000)
- Bring on the Blues (Fuel 2000/Varèse Sarabande, 2003) U.S. Blues number 15
- Back to Zen (Self-released, 2003) - reissue of Road to Zen
- Mean and Lean (Self-released, 2003) - reissue of Getaway
- Alone at Last (Self-released, 2005)
- Albertville (Ruf Records, 2007)
- Myth Live (Self-released, 2008) - 2CD
- The Dreaming Man (Self-released, 2010)
- Galaxy Radio (Self-released, 2012)
- Rumors in the Ether (Self-released, 2014)
- The Party's Gonna Go On (Self-released, 2018)

=== Singles ===
- 1995: "The Brothers" from Blue Drops of Rain
- 1996: "It's Over" from Blue Drops of Rain
- 1996: "Blue Drops of Rain" from Blue Drops of Rain
- 1996: "Crosscut Saw" from Blue Drops of Rain
- 1997: "Road to Zen" from Road to Zen
- 1997: "One More Time" from Road to Zen (U.S. Main Rock number 22)
- 1998: "My Neighborhood" from Road to Zen
- 2003: "Lonesome Road Blues" from Bring on the Blues
- 2003: "Triple Jack" from Bring on the Blues
- 2003: "You're So Evil" from Bring on the Blues

=== Music videos ===
Year	Video	Director
1996	"Blue Drops of Rain"	Susan Johnson
1997	"One More Time"	
2002	"Road To Zen Tour (DVD)"	
