= Kevin Chalfant =

American rock singer

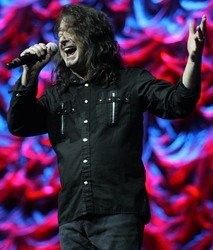

Background information
- Origin: Streator, Illinois, United States
- Genres: Rock
- Occupation: Singer

Kevin Chalfant is an American singer and a native of Streator, Illinois. He obtained a BMI award for co-writing and singing on one of the most frequently aired rock radio hits of 1992 and 1993, "I've Got a Lot to Learn About Love", by The Storm. In October 1993 he very briefly sat in for Steve Perry in Journey, singing lead at a roast for Journey's manager, Herbie Herbert, and in 2003, he toured as lead vocalist for the Alan Parsons Live Project.

== Career ==
=== 707 ===
Chalfant's first national success came when he joined AOR group 707 in 1982. With Chalfant on lead vocals, the band enjoyed its biggest hit, "Mega Force", which peaked at No. 12 on Billboard's Mainstream Rock chart. That success, however, was not enough to assuage internal conflicts and the group disbanded before a follow-up could be recorded.

=== Steel Breeze ===
In 1984, Chalfant joined the band Steel Breeze, who were riding the success of their hit single, "You Don't Want Me Anymore." He recorded one album with the band, Heart on the Line, before leaving in 1985. Around that time, he sang "Hold On to the Vision," the theme to the film No Retreat, No Surrender, featuring Joe Satriani on guitar.

=== The Storm ===
Chalfant later formed The Storm in 1990 with guitarist Josh Ramos and (former) Journey members Ross Valory (bass), Gregg Rolie (keys), and Steve Smith (drums). Journey, a multi-platinum band that was also no stranger to internal conflict, had undergone several personnel changes over the years. Original member and early vocalist/keyboardist Rolie had left Journey to pursue a solo career in 1980, and Valory and Smith had been "replaced" in the studio and on tour in 1986. Chalfant and Valory had dabbled in the studio with a side band called The Vu (pronounced "The View") as the mega-band's (Journey's) turmoil simmered and its next step was considered. By 1989, Journey had splintered completely into a series of solo projects and side bands, and The Storm started brewing.

Released by Interscope Records in late 1991, The Storm hit the album charts and the band's first single, "I've Got A Lot To Learn About Love" surged well into the Top 40 of the Billboard Hot 100. Faring even better at Mainstream Rock radio, the single peaked at No. 6 on the national Billboard charts, and its follow-up, "Show Me The Way" went to No. 22 on the same chart. That spring, the band went on a major US tour in support of Bryan Adams, then at his commercial peak, and playing arenas, moving on to open for Peter Frampton, as well as several headlining dates.

When it came time to release the second Storm album in 1993, however, the band found their label, Interscope, entrenched in the burgeoning rap scene. The band's second album, The Eye of the Storm, did not find label release until 1996, and by then the winds powering The Storm had died out.

=== Journey ===
By 1993, Journey had been on a nearly seven-year hiatus, and the late-1970s lineup was poised to regroup, minus singer Steve Perry, who was in the midst of working on a second solo album. Chalfant stepped in to tackle Perry's parts for a live performance in October 1993 for a Herbie Herbert roast at Bimbo's in San Francisco, he performed five songs with Neal Schon, Jonathan Cain, Gregg Rolie, Ross Valory, Steve Smith and Aynsley Dunbar at a roast for manager Herbie Herbert.[24]. Chalfant proved to be a good fit and was invited to formally join the band. Chalfant then began writing material in 1994 with Rolie, Neal Schon, and Jonathan Cain in anticipation of a full album and tour. By 1995, however Steve Perry had returned for a brief, Grammy Award-nominated reunion of their early-1980s lineup instead, leaving Chalfant suddenly on his own again.

=== Two Fires ===
Two Fires is a band formed by Kevin Chalfant in late 1999 and they have released 3 albums: - Two Fires (released 2000) - Ignition (released 2002) - Burning Bright (released 2010)

In addition to Chalfant on lead vocals, the band's members included his former Storm bandmate Josh Ramos (Guitars / Vocals), Jerry Lee Gingery (Bass / Backing Vocals), Michael Higgins (Guitars / Vocals), Timmy Higgins (Drums), and Michael Gardner (Keyboards / Backing Vocals).

=== Later recordings ===
Chalfant relocated back to his native Illinois and took a couple of years off. Upon his return to music, he brought his spirituality into the fore. He released a solo album in 1997 entitled Running with the Wind. In 2003, he toured as the lead singer for the Alan Parsons Live Project.

In 2004, Chalfant released an album of traditional gospel songs and hymns, Back To Square One, with proceeds going to benefit former Chicago Bear Jerry Stillman. A Christmas CD featuring fans caroling along with Chalfant and his band was released in December 2005.

Chalfant featured in the studio project Shadows Fade, releasing a self-titled album in 2004. Chalfant then signed as the lead singer for Kansas City AOR favorite Shooting Star. He released one album, 2006's Circles, before leaving the band.

In 2007, Chalfant released Fly2Freedom, a 13-track solo album covering his favorite Journey hits. The "fly" of the album's title and its cover art are a humorously self-deprecating homage to the scarab that appeared in the cover art on many of Journey's albums of the 1970s and 1980s. Freedom was the 1985 working title for Journey's followup to their Frontiers album prior to the departure of Valory and Smith; it was ultimately released as Raised On Radio; the title would ultimately be used for the band's album released in 2022. Chalfant is quoted on the label's website as saying, "The Journey love-laden sound has won the hearts of millions of fans world wide. I am proud to consider them personal friends and label them America's Finest Rock Band."

=== Rockingham 2016 ===
In 2016, Chalfant appeared at the three-day Rockingham 2016 melodic/hard rock festival held in Nottingham, England. He appeared on October 23, headlining that day's seven-act programme.
