= Shooting Star (Shooting Star album) =

Studio album by Shooting Star
- Released: January 28, 1980
- Genre: Rock; Hard rock
- Label: Virgin Records
- Producer: Gus Dudgeon

Shooting Star chronology
Shooting Star (1980)	Hang On for Your Life (1981)

Professional ratings
Review scores
Source	Rating
Allmusic	3/5 stars

Shooting Star is the 1980 self-titled debut album by the group Shooting Star. Shooting Star was the first American musical act signed by then upstart label Virgin Records. Gus Dudgeon, mainly known for his work with Elton John, produced the album. "You Got What I Need", "Bring It On", "Tonight", and "Last Chance" all received regular play on AOR radio stations. The album peaked at number 147 on the Billboard 200 album charts. A reviewer for AllMusic called "Last Chance" one of the finest songs ever.

== Track listing ==
All tracks are written by Van McLain and Gary West (except where noted).

No.	Title	Length
1.	"You Got What I Need"	3:45
2.	"Don't Stop Now"	4:36
3.	"Higher" (Michael Brown, McLain, West)	4:15
4.	"Just Friends"	3:58
5.	"Bring It On"	4:45
6.	"Tonight"	4:38
7.	"Rainfall"	2:49
8.	"Midnight Man"	3:35
9.	"Stranger"	4:47
10.	"Last Chance"	6:51
11.	"Wild In The Street" (Bonus track on CD)	4:28

== Personnel ==
- Van McLain – guitars, lead vocals
- Gary West – lead vocals, guitars, keyboards
- Bill Guffey – keyboards
- Steve Thomas – drums
- Ron Verlin – bass
- Charles Waltz – violin, keyboards, vocals
