= Hang On for Your Life =

Studio album by Shooting Star
- Released: July 1981
- Recorded: Randy Bachman's Legend Studios, Lynden WA
- Genre: Rock; Hard rock
- Length: 40:08
- Label: Virgin Records
- Producer: Dennis McKay

Shooting Star chronology
Shooting Star (1979)	Hang On for Your Life (1981)	III Wishes (1982)

Professional ratings
Review scores
Source	Rating
AllMusic	3/5 stars

Hang On for Your Life is the second album by the group Shooting Star. The song Flesh And Blood featured a violin solo, an unusual sound in an up-tempo rock song. American AOR radio stations embraced the record; the songs Hang On for Your Life, Hollywood, Breakout, and Are You on My Side along with Flesh and Blood, all received airplay. This was the last Shooting Star album to feature the original lineup, as founding keyboardist Bill Guffey departed the band following its release.

== Track listing ==
All tracks are written by Van McLain and Gary West.

No.	Title	Length
1.	"Flesh And Blood"	5:48
2.	"Hang On For Your Life"	3:22
3.	"Are You On My Side"	3:15
4.	"Teaser"	3:15
5.	"Hollywood"	4:10
6.	"Breakout"	3:39
7.	"You're So Good"	3:48
8.	"She's Got Money"	3:35
9.	"You've Got Love"	4:53
10.	"Sweet Elatia"	4:16

== Personnel ==
- Van McLain – guitars, lead vocals
- Gary West – lead vocals, guitars, keyboards
- Bill Guffey – keyboards
- Steve Thomas – drums
- Ron Verlin – bass
- Charles Waltz – violin, keyboards, vocals
