= Gear Daddies =

American band

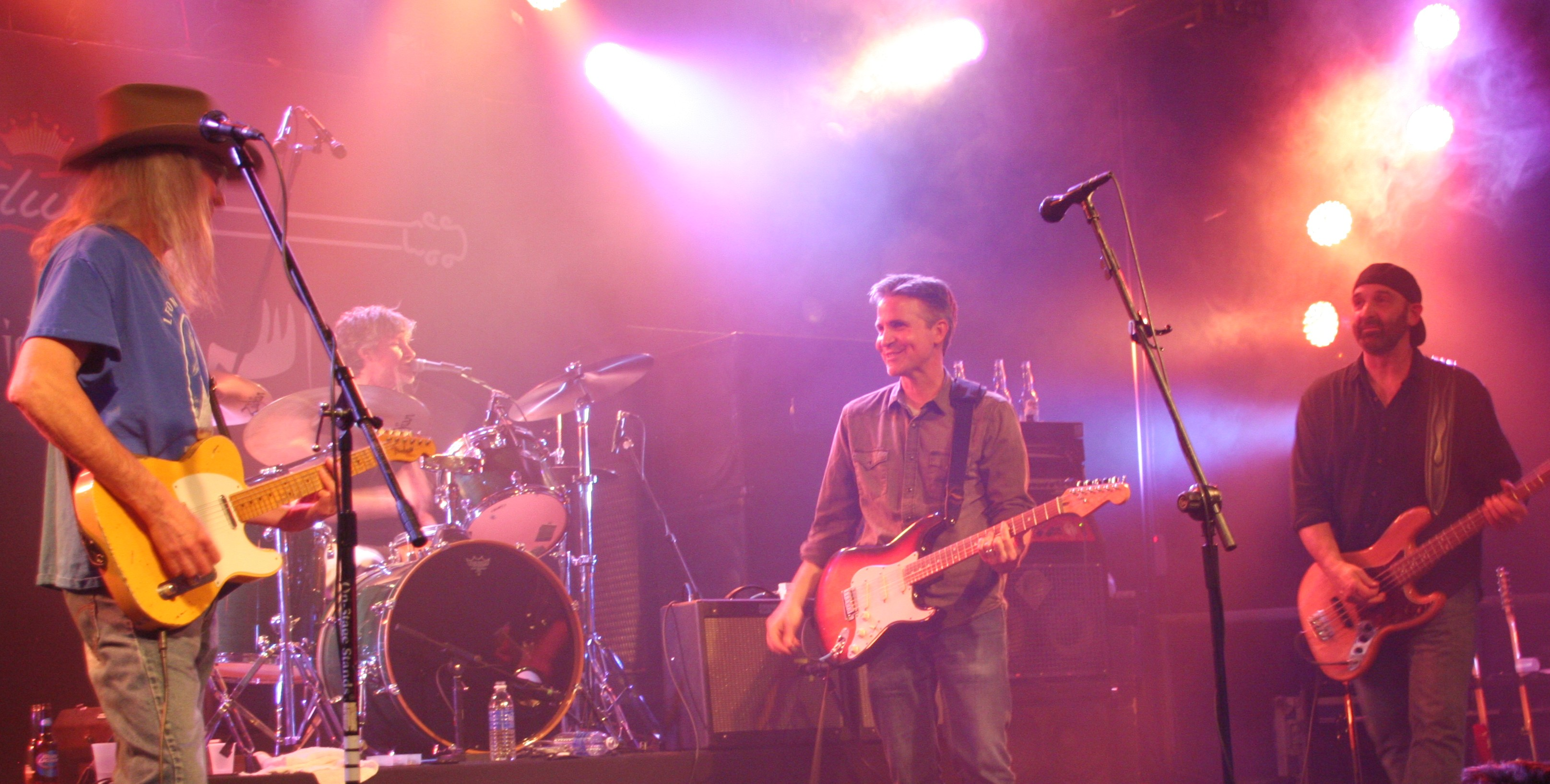

Background information
- Origin: Austin, Minnesota, United States
- Genres: Rock, country, Americana, alternative country
- Years active: 1984–present
- Members: Randy Brouten; Nick Ciola; Billy Dankert; Martin Zellar

Gear Daddies are a rock band originally from Austin, Minnesota. Randy Broughten (electric and steel guitar), Nick Ciola (bass), Billy Dankert (drums and vocals), and Martin Zellar (guitar, harmonica and vocals) played their first shows together in 1984. They released singles and albums between 1986 and 1992 and became an important part of the Twin Cities music scene. Most songs were written by Zellar, but Dankert had several of note, including crowd favorite "Time Heals".

In 1991, Zellar and Broughten played "Stupid Boy" on Late Night with David Letterman. Ciola and Dankert did not play on the show because, at the time, many bands simply sat in with The World's Most Dangerous Band. Zellar said of the experience: "I was so nervous, and it happened so quick. I couldn't tell you what the hell happened. I got done, and I was walking back and said to Randy (Broughten) 'Did I sing all the words? Did I do that?' When I watched it that night in the hotel room, I had no recollection of having lived it."

Although their song "Zamboni" was originally a hidden track on their album Billy's Live Bait, it became one of their best-known songs as it often was played during intermissions at hockey games throughout North America. It later was featured in the movies D2: The Mighty Ducks and Mystery, Alaska as well as on television program Malcolm in the Middle.

The Gear Daddies song "Boys Will Be Boys" was used on the soundtrack of 1994 independent film Bound and Gagged: A Love Story.

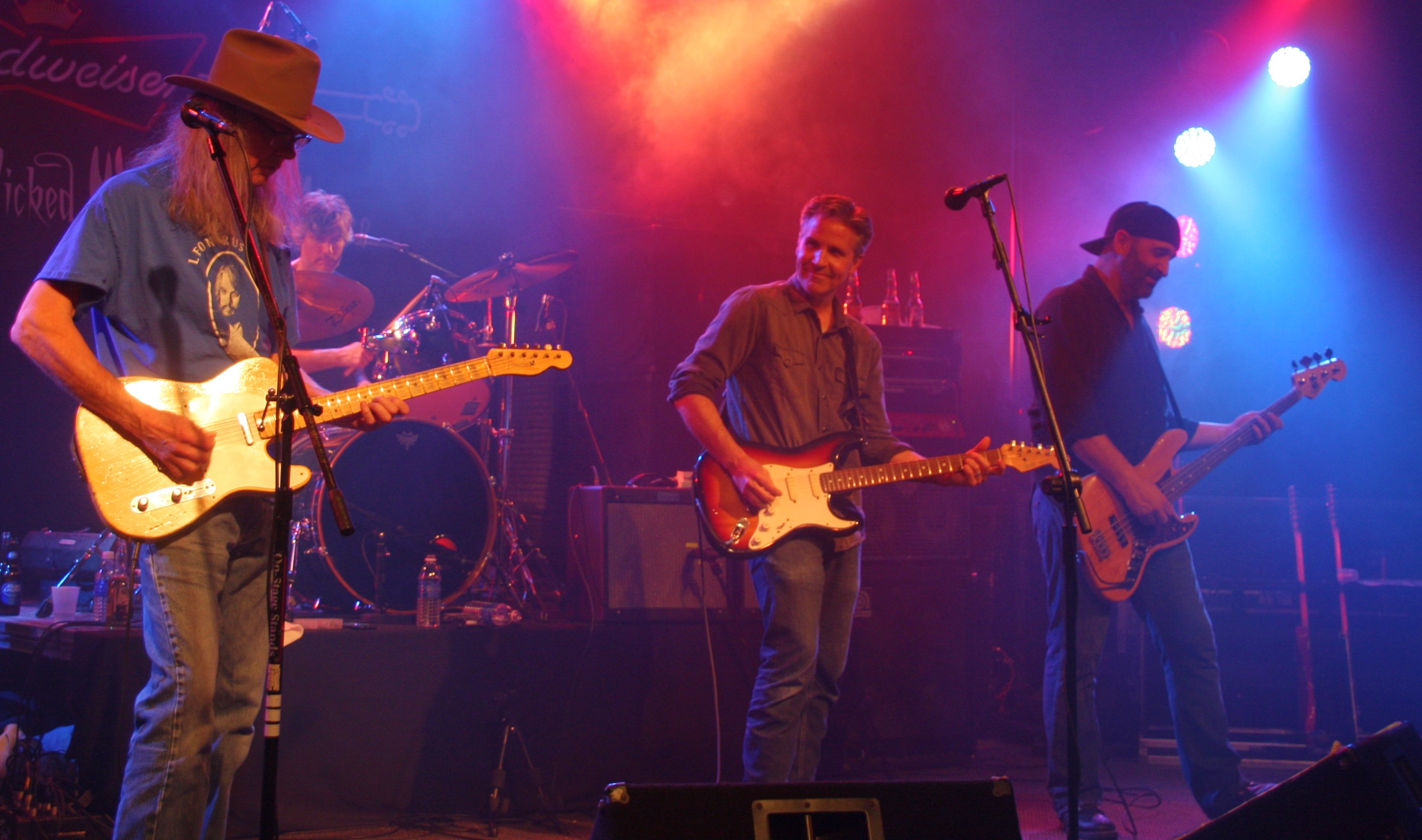
The Gear Daddies in 2016 performing in Rochester, Minnesota

After the dissolution of the band, Zellar began an active career of performing and recording with the band that became known as Martin Zellar and the Hardways, taking with him long-time friend and bassist Nick Ciola.

Electric guitarist Randy Broughten is currently a physical education teacher in Eagan, Minnesota. As well as being a member of the Cactus Blossoms, he has been the steel guitar player for many years with Minneapolis country band Trailer Trash, who are known for their annual Christmas shows and who had a cameo in the mockumentary film Dill Scallion.

Drummer James "Billy" Dankert is a professional visual artist as well as a musician.

As of the present, all four members of the Gear Daddies reunite several times a year to perform throughout the Midwest.

The Gear Daddies were an influence on a number of bands that emerged in the upper Midwest in the late 1980s through the 1990s, including Johnny Clueless, The Billy's, Steve's Piece, Violet, Shoot Lucy, Leep 27, Dazy Head Mazy, Groundhouse and Six Mile Grove.

== Honors and awards ==
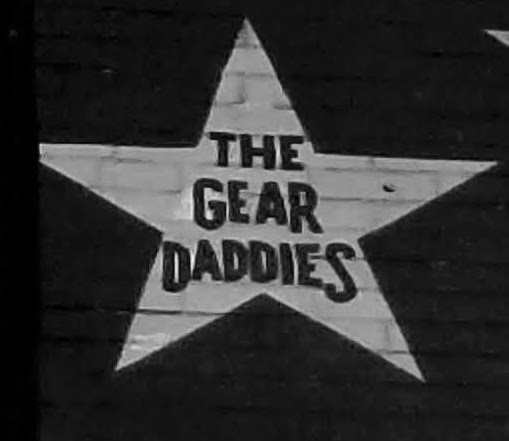
Star honoring Gear Daddies on the outside mural of the Minneapolis nightclub First Avenue

The Gear Daddies were honored with a star on the outside mural of the Minneapolis nightclub First Avenue, recognizing performers that have played sold-out shows or have otherwise demonstrated a major contribution to the culture at the iconic venue. Receiving a star "might be the most prestigious public honor an artist can receive in Minneapolis," according to journalist Steve Marsh.

== Discography ==
- Albums
  - Let's Go Scare Al (1988)
  - Billy's Live Bait (1990)
  - Can't Have Nothin' Nice (1992)
- EPs
  - Color of Her Eyes (1990)
- Miscellaneous
- The song "Zamboni" appeared on the soundtracks for the Disney movies:
  - D2: The Mighty Ducks (1994)
  - Mystery, Alaska (1999)
