= Billy's Live Bait =

Studio album by Gear Daddies
- Released: 1990
- Genre: Rock, country rock
- Length: 35:54
- Label: Polygram
- Producer: Tom Herbers, Gear Daddies

Gear Daddies chronology
| Let's Go Scare Al (1988) | Billy's Live Bait (1990) | Can't Have Nothin' Nice (1992) |

Billy's Live Bait is the second album by Austin, Minnesota band the Gear Daddies, released in 1990. It was their first release for a major label.

"(I Wanna Drive the) Zamboni" is often played at hockey rinks.

== Critical reception ==
Professional ratings
Review scores
| Source | Rating |
|---|---|
| AllMusic | 4.5/5 stars |
| Entertainment Weekly | B− |
| MusicHound Rock: The Essential Album Guide | 3.5/5 stars |

The Chicago Reader called it "terrific," writing that, compared to the debut, "the record is less naive, has more shape, and rocks out more confidently." The Chicago Tribune wrote: "Though often as dark and unsettling as Al, Billy is more outward-looking, less concerned with small circles." The Los Angeles Times wrote that "the Gear Daddies' basic, garage-rock style is brightened by a touch of country-music color and twang, but the heart of the quartet's vision is in the passionate, liberating edge of Zellar's songs and in the warm, almost conversational tone of his vocals."

Trouser Press wrote that "the quartet upgrades its sound and rocks more forcefully, with [Martin] Zellar and [Randy] Broughten bouncing guitar rhythms off one another." AllMusic called the album "sometimes poignant and often humorous."

== Track listing ==
1. "Stupid Boy"
2. "Sonic Boom"
3. "Wear Your Crown"
4. "Don't Look at Me"
5. "Time Heals"
6. "Gonna Change"
7. "No One's Home"
8. "Color of Her Eyes"
9. "Goodbye Marie"
10. "One Voice"
11. "(I Wanna Drive the) Zamboni" (Hidden track)
