= Eclipse Tour =

2011–13 concert tour by Journey

- Tour by Journey
- Location: Asia; Europe; North America; Oceania; South America
- Associated album: Eclipse
- Start date: February 23, 2011
- End date: September 20, 2013
- Legs: 11
- No. of shows: 232

Journey concert chronology
- Revelation Tour (2008–2009); Eclipse Tour (2011–2013); Def Leppard & Journey 2018 Tour (2018)

The Eclipse Tour was a concert tour by American rock band Journey. It was in support of the group's fourteenth studio album Eclipse. The album is Arnel Pineda's second since joining the band in 2007. Special guests on the 2011 tour include Foreigner and Night Ranger for most of the North American dates, Styx for the European dates, and Sweet for South American dates. The tour was the sixth top-grossing concert tour from July 23, 2011, to September 23, 2011, bringing in over $21 million and selling over 900,000 tickets. For the 2012 U.S. tour, special guests were Pat Benatar and Loverboy, and the guests for the 2013 tour were Deep Purple for the Australian dates, and Whitesnake for the European dates. For the 2014–2015 tour, the Steve Miller Band co-headlined. The 2016 tour saw the band play with The Doobie Brothers, as well as signal the return of "classic" drummer Steve Smith after longtime drummer Deen Castronovo was fired from the group. The 2017 tour had Asia co-headline, and also included the band's induction and performance at their induction into the Rock and Roll Hall of Fame. This tour is also the longest-running in the entire history of the band.

== Set list – leg 1 ==
1. "Separate Ways (Worlds Apart)"
2. "Edge of The Moment"
3. "Only the Young"
4. "Ask the Lonely"
5. "Never Walk Away"
6. "Send Her My Love"
7. "Resonate"
8. "Stone in Love"
9. "Keep on Running"
10. "City of Hope"
11. "Lights"
12. "Open Arms"
13. "Chain of Love"
14. "Mother, Father"
15. "Wheel in the Sky"
16. "Human Feel"
17. "Be Good to Yourself"
18. "Faithfully"
19. "Don't Stop Believin'"
20. "Any Way You Want It"

Encore:

21. "Escape"
22. "Lovin', Touchin', Squeezin'"

== Set list – leg 2 ==
1. "Majestic"
2. "Never Walk Away"
3. "Ask the Lonely"
4. "After All These Years"
5. "Chain Reaction"
6. "La Do Da"
7. "Still They Ride"
8. "Only the Young"
9. "Faith In The Heartland"
10. "Faithfully"
11. "Stone in Love"
12. "Send Her My Love"
13. "Where Did I Lose Your Love"
14. "Lights"
15. "City Of Hope"
16. "Wheel in the Sky"
17. "Open Arms"
18. "Separate Ways"
19. "Be Good To Yourself'"
20. "Don't Stop Believin'"
21. "Any Way You Want It"

Encore:

22. "Escape"
23. "Lovin', Touchin', Squeezin'"

== Concert gross ==
2011

- The Eclipse Tour concert tour was the 18th highest-grossing concert tour of 2011 bringing in $39,069,939.
- According to Pollstar it was the highest-grossing concert from July 23, 2011, to September 23, 2011, bringing in over $21 million.
- The tour had 17 sellouts and averaged over $600,000 per show.

2012

- Journey was #36 on Pollstars Top 200 North American Tours, grossing 25.8 million during the 2012 The Eclipse Tour concert tour.
- The tour grossed over $469,000 each night, with an average of 7,745 in attendance per show.
- The total ticket sales were in excess of $425,000

== Personnel ==
- Neal Schon – lead guitar, backing vocals
- Ross Valory – bass, backing vocals
- Jonathan Cain – keyboards, rhythm guitar, backing vocals
- Deen Castronovo – drums, percussion, backing vocals (2011–2015)
- Steve Smith – drums, percussion (2016–2017)
- Arnel Pineda – lead vocals

with:

- Travis Thibodaux – keyboards, backing vocals (2016−2017)

Special guests

- Europe – Foreigner, Styx, Saga, Kansas, Night Ranger, and FM
- North America – Foreigner, Night Ranger,
- Central America – Night Ranger
- Puerto Rico – Night Ranger
- South America – The Sweet
- 2012 North America Leg – Pat Benatar, Loverboy
- 2013 Australia Tour – Deep Purple Co-headliner
- 2013 Europe Tour – Whitesnake Co-headliner
- 2013 North America- Rascal Flatts, The Band Perry & Cassadee Pope (Hershey & Atlantic City Only)
- 2014–2015 North America – Steve Miller Band, Tower of Power, Neal "Vortex" Schon
- 2016 North America – The Doobie Brothers, Dave Mason
- 2017 North America – Asia

Omar Hakim- filling in for Deen Castronovo for the shows in other countries and 2015 North American dates

== Tour dates ==
Date	City	Country	Venue
Pre-Tour warm up show
February 23, 2011	Las Vegas	United States	Planet Hollywood Resort & Casino
February 25, 2011	Reno	United States	Reno Events Center
South America
March 26, 2011	Santiago	Chile	Movistar Arena
March 28, 2011	Buenos Aires	Argentina	Luna Park
March 30, 2011	São Paulo	Brazil	Via Funchal
April 2, 2011	Lima	Peru	Jockey Club del Perú
April 5, 2011	Caracas	Venezuela	Centro Sambil
North America
April 7, 2011	Guatemala City	Guatemala	Mundo E
April 9. 2011	Panama City	Panama	Figali Convention Center
April 12, 2011	Mexico City	Mexico	National Auditorium
April 13, 2011	Monterrey	Mexico	Monterrey Arena
April 16, 2011	San Juan	Puerto Rico	Coliseo de Puerto Rico, José Miguel Agrelot
Europe
June 4, 2011	London	England	Wembley Arena
June 5, 2011	Birmingham	England	LG Arena
June 7, 2011	Newcastle upon Tyne	England	Metro Radio Arena
June 8, 2011	Manchester	England	manchester Evening News Arena
June 9, 2011	Glasgow	Scotland	Scottish Exhibition and Conference Centre
June 11, 2011	Dublin	Ireland	O2 Arena
June 12, 2011	Belfast	Northern Ireland	Odyssey Arena
June 15, 2011	Berlin	Germany	Zitadelle
June 17, 2011	Hanover	Germany	Parkbuehne
June 18, 2011	Esslingen am Neckar	Germany	Richard-Hirschman Eisstadion
June 19, 2011	Winterthur	Switzerland	Deutweg
June 21, 2011	Milan	Italy	Arena Fiera
June 22, 2011	Augsburg	Germany	Schwabenhalle
June 24, 2011	Dessel	Belgium	Graspop Metal Meeting
June 25, 2011	Sankt Goarshausen	Germany	Freilichtbühne Loreley
June 26, 2011	Leipzig	Germany	Arena Leipzig
June 28, 2011	Copenhagen	Denmark	Copenhagen Concert Hall
June 30, 2011	Haugesund	Norway	Skaanevik Blues Festival
July 2, 2011	Borlänge	Sweden	Peace & Love
July 5, 2011	Luxembourg City	Luxembourg	Rockhal
July 7, 2011	Paris	France	Palace of Sports
July 8, 2011	Weert	Netherlands	Bospop
North America
July 15, 2011	Oshkosh	United States	Ford Festival Park-Rock USA Festival
July 18, 2011	Omaha	United States	TD Ameritrade Park
July 21, 2011	Sandy	United States	Rio Tinto Stadium
July 23, 2011	Irvine	United States	Verizon Wireless Amphitheatre
July 24, 2011	Phoenix	United States	Ashley Furniture HomeStore Pavilion
July 27, 2011	Maryland Heights	United States	Verizon Wireless Amphitheatre
July 28, 2011	Saint Paul	United States	Xcel Center
July 30, 2011	Tinley Park	United States	First Midwest Bank Amphitheatre
July 31, 2011	Clarkston	United States	DTE Energy Music Theatre
August 2, 2011	Cuyahoga Falls	United States	Blossom Music Center
August 3, 2011	Cincinnati	United States	Riverbend Music Center
August 5, 2011	Columbus	United States	Columbus Crew Stadium
August 6, 2011	Noblesville	United States	Verizon Wireless Music Center
August 9, 2011	Toronto	Canada	Molson Canadian Amphitheatre
August 10, 2011	Darien Center	United States	Darien Lake Performing Arts Center
August 12, 2011	Mansfield	United States	Comcast Theatre
August 13, 2011	Camden	United States	Susquehanna Bank Center
August 16, 2011	Hershey	United States	Hersheypark Stadium
August 17, 2011	Wantagh	United States	Nikon at Jones Beach Theater
August 19, 2011	Virginia Beach	United States	Farm Bureau Live
August 20, 2011	Raleigh	United States	Time Warner Cable Music Pavilion
August 21, 2011	Charlotte	United States	Verizon Wireless Amphitheatre
August 24, 2011	Holmdel	United States	PNC Bank Arts Center
August 25, 2011	Hartford	United States	Comcast Theatre
August 27, 2011	Burgettstown	United States	First Niagara Pavilion
August 28, 2011	Bristow	United States	Nissan Pavilion
August 30, 2011	Syracuse	United States	Great New York State Fair
August 31, 2011	Allentown	United States	Great Allentown Fair
September 2, 2011	Saratoga Springs	United States	Saratoga Performing Arts Center
September 3, 2011	Atlantic City	United States	Borgata Events Center
September 4, 2011	Bristow	United States	Jiffy Lube Live
September 10, 2011	New Orleans	United States	New Orleans Arena
September 13, 2011	Nashville	United States	Bridgestone Arena
September 14, 2011	Memphis	United States	FedExForum
September 16, 2011	Atlanta	United States	Lakewood Amphitheatre
September 17, 2011	Tampa	United States	MidFlorida Credit Union Amphitheatre
September 18, 2011	West Palm Beach	United States	Cruzan Amphitheatre
September 21, 2011	San Antonio	United States	AT&T Center
September 22, 2011	Austin	United States	Frank Erwin Center
September 24, 2011	Dallas	United States	Gexa Energy Pavilion
September 25, 2011	The Woodlands	United States	Cynthia Woods Mitchell Pavilion
September 27, 2011	Oklahoma City	United States	Zoo Amphitheatre
September 28, 2011	Kansas City	United States	Starlight Theatre
September 30, 2011	Albuquerque	United States	The Pavilion
October 1, 2011	Greenwood Village	United States	Comfort Dental Amphitheatre
October 4, 2011	Santa Barbara	United States	Santa Barbara Bowl
October 5, 2011	Concord	United States	Sleep Train Pavilion
October 7, 2011	Chula Vista	United States	Cricket Wireless Amphitheatre
October 8, 2011	Las Vegas	United States	MGM Grand Garden Arena
October 11, 2011	Los Angeles	United States	Hollywood Bowl
October 12, 2011	Fresno	United States	Save Mart Center
October 14, 2011	Wheatland	United States	Sleep Train Amphitheatre
October 15, 2011	Mountain View	United States	Shoreline Amphitheatre
October 19, 2011	Portland	United States	Rose Garden Arena
October 21, 2011	Seattle	United States	KeyArena
February 24, 2012	Nashville	United States	Jackson Hall, Tennessee Performing Arts Center
April 27, 2012	San Francisco	United States	The Regency Ballroom
July 21, 2012	San Bernardino	United States	San Manuel Amphitheater
July 22, 2012	Lake Tahoe	United States	Lake Tahoe Outdoor Arena
July 24, 2012	Paso Robles	United States	Paso Robles Event Center
July 26, 2012	Cheyenne	United States	Cheyenne Frontier Days
July 28, 2012	George	United States	Gorge Amphitheatre
July 29, 2012	Spokane	United States	Northern Quest Resort & Casino
August 1, 2012	Great Falls	United States	Montana ExpoPark
August 3, 2012	West Valley City	United States	USANA Amphitheatre
August 4, 2012	Nampa	United States	Idaho Center
August 6, 2012	Sturgis	United States	Buffalo Chip Campground Amphitheatre
August 8, 2012	Indianapolis	United States	Bankers Life Fieldhouse
August 10, 2012	Wantagh	United States	Nikon at Jones Beach Theatre
August 11, 2012	Atlantic City	United States	Ovation Hall, Revel Atlantic City
August 14, 2012	Watertown	United States	Duffy Fairgrounds
August 15, 2012	Candaigua	United States	Constellation Brands Marvin Sands Performing Arts Center
August 17, 2012	Louisville	United States	Freedom Hall
August 18, 2012	Des Moines	United States	Iowa State Fair
August 22, 2012	Albuquerque	United States	Sandia Casino Amphitheater
August 24, 2012	The Woodlands	United States	Cynthia Woods Mitchell Pavilion
August 25, 2012	Dallas	United States	Gexa Energy Pavilion
August 27, 2012	Birmingham	United States	Oak Mountain Amphitheatre
August 28, 2012	Lafayette	United States	Cajundome
August 30, 2012	Tampa	United States	Tampa Convention Center
August 31, 2012	Kansas City	United States	Livestrong Sporting Park
September 1, 2012	Saint Paul	United States	Minnesota State Fair
September 15, 2012	Mt. Pleasant	United States	Soaring Eagle Casino Amphitheater
September 19, 2012	Peoria	United States	Peoria Civic Center
September 21, 2012	Cincinnati	United States	Riverbend Music Center
September 22, 2012	Cuyahoga Falls	United States	Blossom Music Center
September 25, 2012	Hamilton	Canada	Copps Coliseum
September 26, 2012	Ottawa	Canada	Scotiabank Place
September 28, 2012	Bangor	United States	Waterfront Park
September 29, 2012	Providence	United States	Dunkin' Donuts Center
October 2, 2012	Norfolk	United States	Ted Constant Convocation Center
October 3, 2012	Greensboro	United States	Greensboro Coliseum
October 5, 2012	Mobile	United States	Bayfest
October 6, 2012	Atlanta	United States	Lakewood Amphitheatre
October 9, 2012	Little Rock	United States	Verizon Arena
October 10, 2012	Tulsa	United States	BOK Center
October 12, 2012	Tampa	United States	1-800-ASK-GARY Amphitheater
October 13, 2012	West Palm Beach	United States	Cruzan Amphitheatre
October 14, 2012	Baltimore	United States	Modell Performing Arts Center
October 16, 2012	Lafayette	United States	Cajundome
November 2, 2012	Uncasville	United States	Mohegan Sun Arena
November 3, 2012	Manchester	United States	Verizon Wireless Arena
November 5, 2012	Montreal	Canada	Bell Centre
November 7, 2012	Columbus	United States	Nationwide Arena
November 16, 2012	Milwaukee	United States	BMO Harris Bradley Center
November 17, 2012	Green Bay	United States	Resch Center
November 19, 2012	Winnipeg	Canada	MTS Centre
November 24, 2012	Grand Prairie	Canada	Crystal Centre
November 25, 2012	Calgary	Canada	Scotiabank Saddledome
November 27, 2012	Edmonton	Canada	Rexall Place
November 28, 2012	Saskatoon	Canada	Credit Union Centre
December 1, 2012	Kelowna	Canada	Prospera Place
December 3, 2012	Vancouver	Canada	Rogers Arena
December 4, 2012	Victoria	Canada	Save-On-Foods Memorial Centre
December 7, 2012	Las Vegas	United States	Planet Hollywood Resort & Casino
December 8, 2012	Indio	United States	Fantasy Springs Resort Casino
December 12, 2012	Honolulu	United States	Neil Blaisdell Center
December 14, 2012	Honolulu	United States	Neil Blaisdell Center
December 15, 2012	Honolulu	United States	Neil Blaisdell Center
February 2, 2013	New Orleans	United States	Sugarmill (CMT Crossroads With Rascal Flatts)
February 5, 2013	Sioux City	United States	Tyson Events Center
February 6, 2013	Moline	United States	I Wireless Center
February 9, 2013	Grand Rapids	United States	Van Andel Arena
February 10, 2013	Fort Wayne	United States	Allen County War Memorial Coliseum
February 12, 2013	Evansville	United States	Ford Center
Oceania
February 24, 2013	Auckland	New Zealand	Vector Arena
February 26, 2013	Brisbane	Australia	Brisbane Entertainment Centre
March 1, 2013	Melbourne	Australia	Rod Laver Arena
March 2, 2013	Sydney	Australia	Sydney Entertainment Centre
March 4, 2013	Adelaide	Australia	Adelaide Entertainment Centre
March 7, 2013	Perth	Australia	Perth Arena
Asia
March 11, 2013	Tokyo	Japan	Nippon Budokan
March 12, 2013	Osaka	Japan	Grand Cube
March 14, 2013	Hiroshima	Japan	Shi Bunka Koryu Kaikan
March 15, 2013	Nagoya	Japan	Shi Kokaido
March 17, 2013	Kanazawa	Japan	Kagekiza
March 19, 2013	Singapore		Singapore Indoor Stadium
Europe
May 16, 2013	Belfast	Northern Ireland	Odyssey Arena
May 18, 2013	Glasgow	Scotland	Scottish Exhibition and Conference Centre
May 20, 2013	Sheffield	England	Motorpoint Arena Sheffield
May 22, 2013	Newcastle upon Tyne	England	Metro Radio Arena
May 23, 2013	Manchester	England	Manchester Arena
May 25, 2013	Nottingham	England	Capital FM Arena
May 26, 2013	Cardiff	England	Motorpoint Arena Cardiff
May 28, 2013	Birmingham	England	LG Arena
May 29, 2013	Wembley	England	Wembley Arena
June 1, 2013	Inzell	Germany	Max Aicher Arena
June 2, 2013	St. Goarshausen	Germany	Freilichtbuhne Loreley
North America
July 19, 2013	Cheyenne	United States	Cheyenne Frontier Days
July 20, 2013	Minot	United States	North Dakota State Fair
July 24, 2013	Windsor	Canada	Caesars Windsor
July 26, 2013	London	Canada	Rock the Park
July 27, 2013	Belleville	Canada	Empire Square Live
July 29, 2013	Rama	Canada	Casino Rama
August 1, 2013	Hershey	United States	Hersheypark Stadium (With Rascal Flatts The Band Perry & Cassadee Pope)
August 3, 2013	Gilford	United States	Bank of New Hampshire Pavilion
August 4, 2013	Atlantic City	United States	Boardwalk Hall (With Rascal Flatts & Cassadee Pope)
August 15, 2013	Kinder	United States	Coushatta Casino Resort
August 16, 2013	Lampe	United States	Black Oak Mountain Amphitheater
August 18, 2013	Springfield	United States	Illinois State Fair
August 20, 2013	Highland Park	United States	Ravinia Festival
August 21, 2013	Highland Park	United States	Ravinia Festival
August 23, 2013	Catoosa	United States	Hard Rock Hotel and Casino
August 24, 2013	Mulvane	United States	Kansas Star Arena
August 26, 2013	Albuquerque	United States	Sandia Casino Amphitheater
August 28, 2013	Las Vegas	United States	Pearl Concert Theater
August 29, 2013	Las Vegas	United States	Pearl Concert Theater
September 1, 2013	Snowmass	United States	Jazz Aspen Snowmass Festival, Snowmass Town Park
September 14, 2013	Stateline	United States	Harveys Outdoor Arena
September 16, 2013	San Francisco	United States	America's Cup Pavilion
September 20, 2013	Atlanta	United States	Piedmont Park

=== Box office score data ===
2012

Venue	City	Tickets sold / available	Gross revenue	Ref.
San Manuel Amphitheater	Devore	11,892 / 19,150 (62%)	$619,567	
California Mid-State Fair	Paso Robles	11,136 / 14,202 (78%)	$579,940	
Cheyenne Frontier Days	Cheyenne	15,626 / 21,227 (74%)	$814,964	
The Gorge	George	10,618 / 11,816 (90%)	$663,694	
Montana State Fair	Great Falls	6,046 / 6,481 (93%)	$480,463	
USANA Amphitheatre	West Valley City	11,030 / 18,370 (60%)	$651,357	
Idaho Center Amphitheater	Nampa	4,834 / 9,489 (51%)	$278,393	
Nikon at Jones Beach Theater	Wantagh	8,652 / 12,770 (76%)	$589,693	
Ovation Hall	Atlantic City	3,608 / 3,921 (92%)	$464,520	
Watertown Fairgrounds Arena	Watertown	5,602 / 7,532 (74%)	$356,255	
CMAC Performing Arts Center	Canandaigua	7,902 / 14,163 (56%)	$410,383	
Freedom Hall Coliseum	Louisville	13,730 / 13,730 (100%)	$567,640	
Iowa State Fair	Des Moines	10,904 / 11,498 (95%)	$519,312	
Sandia Casino Amphitheater	Albuquerque	4,207 / 4,207 (100%)	$335,136	
Cynthia Woods Mitchell Pavilion	The Woodlands	15,374 / 15,374 (100%)	$845,667	
Gexa Energy Pavilion	Dallas	14,298 / 19,050 (75%)	$691,272	
Oak Mountain Amphitheatre	Pelham	6,405 / 9,862 (65%)	$361,703	
Livestrong Sporting Park	Kansas City	8,809 / 11,227 (78%)	$542,883	
Minnesota State Fair	St. Paul	12,703 / 12,703 (100%)	$629,558	

2016

Venue	City	Tickets sold / available	Gross revenue	Ref.
PPL Center	Allentown	7,192 / 8,020 (90%)	$701,094	
Irvine Meadows Amphitheatre	Irvine	13,457 / 13,457 (100%)	$974,534	
Ak-Chin Pavilion	Phoenix	16,136 / 18,088 (89%)	$877,604	
Isleta Amphitheatre	Albuquerque	9,267 / 14,299 (65%)	$449,803	
Austin360 Amphitheatre	Austin	8,877 / 11,940 (74%)	$649,642	
Gexa Energy Pavilion	Dallas	19,501 / 19,501 (100%)	$1,065,448	
Cynthia Woods Mitchell Pavilion	The Woodlands	15,550 / 15,550 (100%)	$944,246	
Sprint Center	Kansas City	10,115 / 12,125 (83%)	$756,673	
Walmart Arkansas Music Pavilion	Rogers	9,658 / 9,658 (100%)	$620,837	
Oak Mountain Amphitheatre	Pelham	9,563 / 9,780 (98%)	$507,966	
PNC Music Pavilion	Charlotte	17,238 / 17,238 (100%)	$862,988	
Coastal Credit Union Music Park at Walnut Creek	Raleigh	11,065 / 19,130 (58%)	$530,566	
Aaron's Amphitheatre	Lakewood	12,891 / 17,928 (72%)	$652,463	
MidFlorida Credit Union Amphitheatre	Tampa	15,873 / 18,187 (87%)	$890,788	
Perfect Vodka Amphitheatre	West Palm Beach	14,163 / 18,530 (76%)	$719,378	
Darling's Waterfront Pavilion	Bangor	7,398 / 12,870 (57%)	$485,586	
Bethel Woods Center for the Arts	Bethel	10,450 / 16,613 (63%)	$567,501	
PNC Banks Arts Center	Holmdel	12,922 / 16,268 (79%)	$741,291	
Nikon at Jones Beach Theater	Wantagh	11,266 / 13,098 (86%)	$728,366	

2017

Venue	City	Tickets sold / available	Gross revenue	Ref.
Spokane Arena	Spokane	8,071 / 9,427 (86%)	$620,263	
Taco Bell Arena	Boise	6,575 / 7,995 (82%)	$508,171	
Brick Breeden Fieldhouse	Bozeman	4,416 / 7,178 (61%)	$372,696	
Choctaw Grande Theater	Durant	5,585 / 5,629 (99%)	$511,205	
Soaring Eagle Casino & Resort	Mt. Pleasant	12,600 / 12,600 (100%)	$606,402	
Battery Park at Hard Rock Hotel & Casino	Sioux City	4,868 / 4,868 (100%)	$320,550	
Treasure Island Resort & Casino	Welch	13,709 / 16,078 (85%)	$667,035	
JQH Arena	Springfield	7,869 / 7,869 (100%)	$540,009	
BankPlus Amphitheater at Snowden Grove	Southaven	5,369 / 11,267 (48%)	$284,915	
Oak Mountain Amphitheatre	Pelham	8,362 / 9,824 (85%)	$574,376	
CenturyLink Center	Bossier City	11,337 / 11,337 (100%)	$661,914	
Smart Financial Centre	Sugar Land	5,918 / 5,918 (100%)	$584,471	
Laredo Energy Arena	Laredo	6,557 / 8,421 (78%)	$520,694	
Anselmo Valencia Tori Amphitheater	Tucson	4,283 / 4,405 (97%)	$308,427	
Don Haskins Center	El Paso	7,364 / 7,364 (100%)	$565,788	
Klipsch Music Center	Noblesville	11,246 / 22,244 (51%)	$478,859	
Coastal Credit Union Music Park at Walnut Creek	Raleigh	9,851 / 17,144 (57%)	$375,605	
Daily's Place	Jacksonville	4,919 / 4,919 (100%)	$561,500	

== Cancelled shows ==
List of cancelled concerts, showing date, city, country and venue.
Date	City	Country	Venue
August 28, 2012	Lafayette	United States	Cajundome
October 30, 2012	New York City	United States	Barclays Center
March 21, 2013	Manila	Philippines	Mall of Asia Arena
March 23, 2013	Yigo	Guam	Yigo Park
