= Pineda =

Pineda may refer to:

- Pineda (surname)
- Pineda (plant), a genus of flowering plants in the family Salicaceae
- Pineda, Guerrero, Mexico
- Pineda, Florida, U.S.

== See also ==
- Arnel Pineda (album), an album by Arnel Pineda
- Estadio Winston Pineda (El Condor), a soccer stadium in Escuintla, Guatemala
- Pineda de Gigüela, a municipality in the province of Cuenca, Spain
- Pineda de la Sierra, a municipality in the province of Burgos, Spain
- Pineda de Mar, a municipality in Catalonia, Spain
- Pineda Trasmonte, a municipality in the province of Burgos, Spain
- Pinedas, a municipality in the province of Salamanca, Spain
