= José Pineda =

José Pineda may refer to:

- Jose Antonio Pineda (fl. 1960s-present), Salvadoran poet, actor and author
- José Luis Pineda (born 1975), Honduran football midfielder
- José Pineda (footballer) (born 1990), Mexican football forward
- Gimnasio Nacional José Adolfo Pineda, indoor sporting arena located in San Salvador, El Salvador
