= Pineda (surname) =

Pineda is a Spanish and Catalan toponymic surname. Literally meaning "pine grove" or "pine forest", it is derived from the name of several places in Asturias, Barcelona, Burgos, and Cuenca. Notable people with the surname include:

- Alex Pineda Chacón (born 1969), Honduran football (soccer) player
- Alonso Álvarez de Pineda (died 1519), Spanish explorer
- Álvaro Pineda (1945–1975), Mexican jockey
- Amado Pineda (1938–2015), Filipino meteorologist
- Antonio Pineda (1751–1792), Guatemalan botanist
- Jose Antonio Pineda, Salvadoran beat poet, film actor and author
- Arístides Pineda (born 1940), Venezuelan hurdler
- Arnel Pineda (born 1967), Filipino-American singer-songwriter
- Allan Pineda Lindo (born 1974), Filipino-American rapper and member of The Black Eyed Peas
- Bong Pineda (born 1949), Filipino businessman
- Charee Pineda (born 1990), Filipina actress
- Daniella Pineda (born 1987), Mexican-American actress
- Dennis Pineda (born 1974), Filipino politician, businessman and basketball coach
- Eliza Pineda (born 1995), Filipina child actress
- Empar Pineda (born 1944), Spanish feminist activist
- Esmeralda Pineda (born 1972), Filipino politician and businesswoman
- Gonzalo Pineda (born 1982), Mexican football player
- Israel Pineda (born 2000), Venezuelan baseball player
- Iván de Pineda (born 1977), Argentine fashion model and film actor
- John de Pineda (1558–1637), Spanish Jesuit theologian
- Klea Pineda (born 1999), Filipina actress and model
- Lilia Pineda (born 1951), Filipino politician and businesswoman
- Luis Pineda (born 1974), Dominican-born Major League baseball player
- Laureano Pineda (1802–1853), President of Nicaragua in 1851
- Mariana de Pineda Muñoz (1804–1831), Spanish national heroine
- Mariana Pineda (field hockey) (born 2001), Argentine field hockey player
- Marianna Pineda (1925–1996), American sculptor
- Mauricio Pineda (footballer, born 1975), Argentine football player
- Michael Pineda (born 1989), Dominican baseball player
- Michel Pineda (born 1964), French footballer
- Mylyn Pineda-Cayabyab (born 1982), Filipino politician
- Onyok Pineda (born 2010), Filipino child actor
- Orbelín Pineda (born 1996), Mexican football player
- Orlando Pineda (born 1986), Mexican football player
- Pablo Pineda Gaucín (c. 1961–2000), assassinated Mexican crime reporter
- Paulina Margarita Gálvez Pineda (born 1980), Colombian beauty pageant winner
- Rafael Pineda (television journalist) (1937–2026), Spanish language television news anchor
- Rafael Pineda (boxer) (born 1966), Colombian boxer
- Roberto Pineda (1952–1978) Mexican jockey
- Rosa Fung Pineda (1930s–2026), Peruvian archaeologist
- Salvador Pineda (born 1952), Mexican actor

== Fictional characters ==
- Dorina Pineda, a fictional character in Bituing Walang Ningning

== See also ==
- Mario Pineida (1992–2025), Ecuadorian footballer
