= Live in Manila =

Video by Journey
- Released: October 2, 2009
- Recorded: March 14, 2009
- Venue: Mall of Asia (Manila, Philippines)
- Genre: Hard rock, arena rock
- Length: 145:25
- Label: Nomota LLC (US); Eagle Rock (International)
- Director: Eli Tishberg
- Producer: John Baruck, Dan Barnett, Wizard Entertainment (video); Kevin Shirley (audio)

Journey chronology
Revelation (2008)	Live in Manila (2009)	Eclipse (2011)

Live in Manila is a two-disc video disc set by American rock band Journey, released October 2, 2009 exclusively through Walmart in North America. Filmed with RED technology in 4K resolution, the disc captures the band's concert in Pasay, Philippines. Performing more than two hours of material, including newer songs from the band's latest album, Revelation, Live In Manila documents the homecoming of the band's current lead vocalist, Arnel Pineda.

On March 14, 2009, Journey returned to Pineda's homeland and introduced him as their newest lead singer to a crowd of nearly 30,000 at the SM Mall of Asia Concert Grounds. By the time Journey made their way to Manila, more than 800,000 copies of Revelation had been sold and had been supported with sold-out shows all over the world.

On October 15, 2009, the DVD debuted at No. 1 on the Billboard video charts.

On September 9, 2016, Eagle Rock Entertainment, re-released the album on a single DVD, a Blu-ray and its 2CD audio disc which is the audio portion is available for the first time.

== Set list ==
Intro medley: "The Journey"/"Majestic" (Both songs are instrumental)

1. "Never Walk Away"
2. "Only the Young"
3. "Ask the Lonely"
4. "Stone in Love"
5. "Keep On Running"
6. "After All These Years"
7. "Change for the Better"
8. "Wheel in the Sky"
9. Medley:
  1. "Lights"
  2. "Still They Ride"
10. "Open Arms"
11. "Mother, Father"
12. "Wildest Dreams"
13. "When You Love a Woman"
14. "Separate Ways (Worlds Apart)"
15. "What I Needed"
16. "Edge of the Blade"
17. "Where Did I Lose Your Love"
18. "Escape"
19. "Faithfully"
20. "Don't Stop Believin'"
21. "Any Way You Want It"
22. "Lovin', Touchin', Squeezin'"
23. "Turn Down the World Tonight"
24. "Be Good to Yourself"

== Personnel ==
- Neal Schon – lead guitar, backing vocals
- Jonathan Cain – keyboards, rhythm guitar, backing vocals
- Ross Valory – bass, backing vocals
- Deen Castronovo – drums, backing vocals, lead vocals on "Keep on Running", "Still They Ride" and "Mother, Father"
- Arnel Pineda – lead vocals
