= Revelation (Journey album) =

2008 studio album by Journey

Studio album by Journey
- Released: June 3, 2008
- Recorded: 2008
- Studio: The Plant (Sausalito, California)
- Genres: Hard rock, arena rock
- Length: 56:27 (original material); 48:44 (re-recordings); 105:12 (total)
- Labels: Nomota LLC (US); Frontiers (Europe); Universal (rest of Asia); LOEN Entertainment (South Korea); King (Japan)
- Producer: Kevin Shirley

Journey studio album chronology
Generations (2005)	Revelation (2008)	Eclipse (2011)

Music video
- "Never Walk Away" on YouTube

Revelation

Video by Journey
- Released: June 3, 2008
- Recorded: March 8, 2008
- Venues: Planet Hollywood Resort and Casino (Las Vegas, Nevada)
- Genres: Hard rock, arena rock
- Length: 63:00
- Label: Nomota LLC
- Producer: Kevin Shirley

Journey chronology
Live in Houston 1981: The Escape Tour (2006)	Revelation (2008)	Live in Manila (2009)

Professional ratings
Review scores
Source	Rating
Rolling Stone	3/5 stars
Rock Hard	8/10
Ultimate Guitar	9.3/10
PiercingMetal	4/5 stars

Revelation is the thirteenth studio album by the American rock band Journey, and their first with lead singer Arnel Pineda. It features 11 new songs ("Faith in the Heartland" was previously recorded with Steve Augeri), 11 re-recorded greatest hits (all featuring Pineda) and a DVD (North American version only) featuring the current lineup's concert in Las Vegas, Nevada on March 8, 2008. Three singles penned by Neal Schon and Jonathan Cain were released to radio: the distinctively Journey-sounding "Never Walk Away", "Where Did I Lose Your Love", and the power ballad "After All These Years". "Where Did I Lose Your Love" and "After All These Years" both found success on the adult contemporary charts; "Where Did I Lose Your Love" peaked at No. 19, while "After All These Years" peaked at No. 9 on Billboard's Adult Contemporary chart and stayed on the charts for over 23 weeks. It was met with generally positive reviews, with many calling it a return to form for the band and praising Pineda's vocals, musicianship and the band's performance.

On May 14, 2008, MelodicRock.com reported that Journey and Frontiers Records agreed to add an exclusive original bonus track, "Let It Take You Back", a mid-tempo rocker, to the European release to close the album.

== Production ==
Revelation was recorded throughout early 2008 at The Plant in Sausalito, California by John Neff.

The album was released in the U.S. on June 3, 2008, by Nomota LLC (Schon's personal recording label) exclusively through Wal-Mart, and in Europe on June 6, 2008, through Frontiers Records. In addition, Wal-Mart also released a limited-edition ZVUE 1-gigabyte MP3 player pre-loaded with discs 1–2 of Revelation.

The album was produced by Kevin Shirley, who also produced Trial by Fire and Arrival.

== Reception ==
On its first week of release, Revelation sold over 105,000 copies, marking a 1,400% increase over the first week sales of the band's 2005 release Generations. The album debuted at No. 1 on Billboard's Independent Albums chart, No. 2 on Billboard Rock Album chart, and No. 5 on the Billboard 200, where it remained for 42 weeks. The album was not only a huge success in the United States, but also reached the charts in 9 different countries.

Revelation was nominated for Album of the Year in Classic Rock Magazine's annual poll.

On December 18, 2008, the album was certified platinum by the RIAA, making it Journey's first such certification since their 1996 album Trial by Fire. According to Nielsen Soundscan, Revelation has sold more than 1,000,000 copies in the U.S. as of November 2009.

== Track listing ==
All tracks are written by Neal Schon and Jonathan Cain, except where noted.

Disc 1
No.	Title	Writer(s)	Length
1.	"Never Walk Away"	Schon; Cain; Jeremey Hunsicker	4:19
2.	"Like a Sunshower"		4:29
3.	"Change for the Better"		5:52
4.	"Wildest Dream"		5:02
5.	"Faith in the Heartland" (original version from Generations, 2005)	Schon; Cain; Steve Augeri	6:18
6.	"After All These Years"	Cain	4:10
7.	"Where Did I Lose Your Love"		5:02
8.	"What I Needed"	Schon; Cain; Arnel Pineda	5:28
9.	"What It Takes to Win"		5:23
10.	"Turn Down the World Tonight"		4:56
11.	"The Journey (Revelation)" (Instrumental)	Schon	5:25
12.	"Let It Take You Back" (bonus track on the European and Mexican releases)		4:59
13.	"The Place in Your Heart" (bonus track on the Japanese release; original version from Generations, 2005)		4:45

Disc 2 (Re-recordings featuring Arnel Pineda)
No.	Title	Writer(s)	Length
1.	"Only the Young" (original version from Vision Quest soundtrack, 1985)	Steve Perry; Cain; Schon	4:14
2.	"Don't Stop Believin'" (original version from Escape, 1981)	Perry; Cain; Schon	4:55
3.	"Wheel in the Sky" (original version from Infinity, 1978)	Schon; Diane Valory; Robert Fleischman	5:01
4.	"Faithfully" (original version from Frontiers, 1983)	Cain	4:47
5.	"Any Way You Want It" (original version from Departure, 1980)	Perry; Schon	3:25
6.	"Who's Crying Now" (original version from Escape, 1981)	Perry; Cain	5:16
7.	"Separate Ways (Worlds Apart)" (original version from Frontiers, 1983)	Perry; Cain	5:27
8.	"Lights" (original version from Infinity, 1978)	Perry; Schon	3:16
9.	"Open Arms" (original version from Escape, 1981)	Perry; Cain	3:22
10.	"Be Good to Yourself" (original version from Raised on Radio, 1986)	Perry; Schon; Cain	4:29
11.	"Stone in Love" (original version from Escape, 1981)	Perry; Schon; Cain	4:27

=== DVD ===
1. "Sky Light" (N. Schon)
2. "Any Way You Want It"
3. "Wheel in the Sky"
4. "Lights"
5. "After All These Years"
6. "Never Walk Away"
7. "Open Arms (Prelude)" (Cain)
8. "Open Arms"
9. "Mother, Father" (Perry, Matt Schon, N. Schon, Cain) (from Escape, 1981, Deen Castronovo on lead vocals)
10. "Wildest Dream"
11. "Separate Ways (Worlds Apart)"
12. "Faithfully"
13. "Don't Stop Believin'"
14. "Be Good to Yourself"

== Personnel ==
Journey

- Neal Schon – guitars, backing vocals
- Jonathan Cain – keyboards, backing vocals
- Ross Valory – bass, backing vocals
- Deen Castronovo – drums, backing vocals
- Arnel Pineda – lead vocals

Production

- Kevin Shirley – producer, mixing
- John Neff – engineer
- Justin Pintar – mixing assistant
- George Marino – mastering
- Dave Skaff – FOH Mix-Tracking Engineer

== Charts ==
=== Weekly charts ===
Chart (2008–2010)	Peak position
Dutch Albums (Album Top 100)	51
German Albums (Offizielle Top 100)	35
Japanese Albums (Oricon)	17
Scottish Albums (Official Charts)	55
Swedish Albums (Sverigetopplistan)	28
Swiss Albums (Schweizer Hitparade)	89
UK Albums (Official Charts)	68
UK Independent Albums (Official Charts)	5
UK Rock & Metal Albums (Official Charts)	5
US Billboard 200	5
US Independent Albums (Billboard)	1
US Top Catalog Albums (Billboard)	28
US Top Rock Albums (Billboard)	2

=== Year-end charts ===
Chart (2008)	Position
US Billboard 200	78
US Top Rock Albums (Billboard)	20

== Certifications ==
Region	Certification	Certified units/sales
United States (RIAA)	Platinum	1,000,000^{^}
^{^} Shipments figures based on certification alone.

== Release history ==
Region	Date	Label	Catalog	Format
United States	June 3, 2008	Nomota LLC	4506–2	2 CD + DVD
Europe	June 6, 2008	Frontiers Records	FR CD 376	2 CD
Philippines	July 10, 2008	Universal Music Group	060075310028	2 CD
South Korea	July 10, 2008	LOEN Entertainment	SDP-0125	2 CD
Japan	October 8, 2008	King Records International	KICP-1321	2 CD
