= Arnel Pineda (album) =

Studio album by Arnel Pineda
- Released: 1999
- Genre: Rock, Pinoy rock
- Length: 43:15
- Label: Warner Bros.
- Producer: Kedy Sanchez

Professional ratings
Review scores
Source	Rating
Allmusic	2.5/5 stars

Arnel Pineda is the first studio album by vocalist Arnel Pineda, several years before he became the lead singer of Journey (former lead singer of The Zoo). Released in 1999 on the Warner Bros. record label, the album was a success in the Philippines where two singles achieved radio play: "Iiyak Ka Rin" and "Sayang". The album was re-released on iTunes for download (catalog no. 398429923-4).

== Track listing ==
1. "Sayang" ("What A Waste") (Cajipe, Monet) - 4:48
2. "Bitin" ("Not Enough") (Cajipe, Monet) - 4:36
3. "Iiyak Ka Rin" ("You Too Will Cry") (Pineda, Arnel) - 4:29
4. "You're The One" (Cajipe, Monet) - 5:07
5. "Free Bird" (Pineda, Arnel) - 4:16
6. "Mi Vida, Mi Amor" ("My Life, My Love") (Pineda, Arnel) - 4:10
7. "For My Own Good" (Pineda, Arnel) - 3:45
8. "Isa Pang Pagkakataon" ("One More Chance") (Sanchez, Kedy) - 3:59
9. "It's Over" (Cajipe, Monet) - 4:48
10. "Problema" ("Problem") (Cajipe, Monet) - 3:11

== Personnel ==
- Arnel Pineda: Lead vocals, vocal arrangement
- Johnny Castaneda: Guitar
- Kedy Sanchez: Guitar, producer, vocal arrangement
- Michael Alba: Drums
- Dean Arriola: Artist direction
- Don Manalang: Engineer
- Nikki Cunanan: Engineer
- Jerry Joanino: Engineer
- Isaias Nalasa: Arranger
- Reuben Laurente: Vocal arrangement
- Ricky Ilacad: Executive Producer
