= Eclipse (Journey album) =

Studio album by Journey
- Released: May 24, 2011
- Recorded: 2010–2011
- Studios: Fantasy Studios (Berkeley, California); The Blue Loft, County Q Nashville and Quad Nashville (Nashville, Tennessee)
- Genres: Hard rock; arena rock; heavy metal
- Length: 66:20
- Labels: Nomota LLC (US); Frontiers (Europe); Universal (rest of Asia); LOEN (South Korea); King (Japan)
- Producers: Kevin Shirley, Neal Schon, Jonathan Cain

Journey chronology
Revelation (2008)	Eclipse (2011)	Greatest Hits 2 (2011)

Singles from Eclipse
- 1. "City of Hope" Released: April 4, 2011; 2. "Human Feel" Released: April 4, 2011

Professional ratings
Review scores
Source	Rating
Allmusic	2/5 stars
Rolling Stone	2/5 stars

Eclipse (stylized as ECL1P53) is the fourteenth studio album by the American rock band Journey and the second with lead singer Arnel Pineda. Penned by Neal Schon and Jonathan Cain with contributions from Pineda, the album was released in the United States and Canada on May 24, 2011, on May 27, 2011, in Japan, in the United Kingdom on May 30, 2011, and internationally on June 3, 2011. It is the last studio album to feature bassist Ross Valory, who was dismissed from the group in 2020.

== Production ==
Eclipse was recorded in Berkeley, California. As the album was near completion, producer Kevin Shirley ran out of time. In an effort for the band to release the album in time for the tour, Neal Schon and Jonathan Cain produced the remaining tracks in Nashville. The album was a departure, focusing on a harder rock sound rather than the formulaic pop hits and ballads. Schon, feeling the pop formula became repetitive, wanted to experiment on Eclipse and make it more guitar-oriented and less radio-friendly. Shirley had trepidation about the direction of the album, clashing with Schon creatively. Many of the tracks were re-recorded in Nashville under Schon and Cain's production. Cain supported Eclipse, saying "we'd had this concept in mind from the get go. We've got the ballads we can play all day long. If people want to hear ballads, they can certainly find them on other records."

Despite this intentional change in sound, it does feature four ballads, including "Anything Is Possible", which reached number 21 on the Billboard Adult Contemporary chart.

== Release and reception ==
Eclipse was released on May 24, 2011. In North America it was exclusively sold at Wal-Mart. Eclipse sold 21,400 copies in the United States in its debut week, reaching No. 13 on the US Billboard 200 chart. Eclipse marks Journey's second straight Top 20 album with current lead singer, Arnel Pineda. Internationally, Eclipse entered the Top 40 album charts in five different countries.

Despite high chart positions it descended from the charts within weeks. Eclipse was unable to match the success of Revelation, barely selling 100,000 copies—an 1/8th of the previous album's sales.

Eclipse received mixed to negative reviews. Rolling Stone reviewer Caryn Ganz rated the album at two stars, saying "Journey's second disc with Filipino YouTube discovery Arnel Pineda on vocals is both grand and distractingly proggy." Stephen Thomas Erlewine of Allmusic also rated Eclipse at two stars, praising Journey's ability to fuse their prog-rock abilities with their arena rock sound; however, he goes on to say the album "pulsates with a certain insular chill that isn't especially welcoming; this is music made for the musicians, and if anybody else happens to like it, that's just a minor bonus."

=== Aftermath ===
Though Journey enjoyed the process of recording Eclipse, they considered its lack of success a career setback. They became skeptical of recording a new album, focusing primarily on live performances. Jonathan Cain said "we have a great catalogue here, right now to play. We got a lot of songs that we're not even playing. So, we're like, 'What's the point of makin' a new CD right now?'". Cain did not rule out the possibility of another album, which he says "I think we need to stay sort of closer to who we are, to who we've been -- great songs, great melodies, harmonies -- and not worry about if it's heavy or not. Our fans are getting older, man; they're not headbangers anymore. So if we do anything, I think we need to go back to the center."

== Track listing ==
All tracks are written by Neal Schon and Jonathan Cain except where noted.

Eclipse track listing
No.	Title	Writer(s)	Length
1.	"City of Hope"		6:02
2.	"Edge of the Moment"		5:27
3.	"Chain of Love"		6:10
4.	"Tantra"		6:27
5.	"Anything Is Possible"		5:21
6.	"Resonate"		5:11
7.	"She's a Mystery"	Schon; Cain; Arnel Pineda	6:41
8.	"Human Feel"		6:44
9.	"Ritual"		4:57
10.	"To Whom It May Concern"	A. Pineda; Schon; Cain; Erik Pineda	5:15
11.	"Someone"		4:35
12.	"Venus" (instrumental)	Schon	3:34

Japanese edition bonus track
No.	Title	Writer(s)	Length
13.	"Don't Stop Believin'" (live, from the recordings of Live in Manila)	Steve Perry; Schon; Cain	7:12

== Personnel ==
Journey

- Neal Schon – guitars, backing vocals, co-producer
- Jonathan Cain – keyboards, backing vocals, co-producer
- Ross Valory – bass, backing vocals
- Deen Castronovo – drums, percussion, backing vocals
- Arnel Pineda – lead vocals

Production and design

- Kevin Shirley – producer
- David Kalmusky – engineer, mixing, mastering
- James McCullagh – engineer
- Alberto Hernandez – engineer
- Jesse Nichols – engineer
- Casey Barker – assistant engineer
- Jason Hall – assistant engineer
- Brett Lind – assistant engineer
- Alex Dolphin – assistant engineer
- Travis Shinn – photography

== Charts ==
2011 weekly chart performance for Eclipse
Chart (2011)	Peak position
Austrian Albums (Ö3 Austria)	56
Dutch Albums (Album Top 100)	44
German Albums (Offizielle Top 100)	14
Japanese Albums (Oricon)	19
Scottish Albums (Official Charts)	22
Swedish Albums (Sverigetopplistan)	24
Swiss Albums (Schweizer Hitparade)	24
UK Albums (Official Charts)	33
US Billboard 200	13
US Independent Albums (Billboard)	4
US Top Rock Albums (Billboard)	4

== Release history ==
Region	Date	Label	Format
United States	May 24, 2011	Nomota LLC	CD, digital download
South Korea	May 24, 2011	Evolution Music, LOEN Entertainment	CD, digital download
Japan	May 27, 2011	King Records	CD, digital download
Europe	May 27, 2011	Frontiers	CD, digital download
