= Pineda de Gigüela =

Pineda de Gigüela, Spain
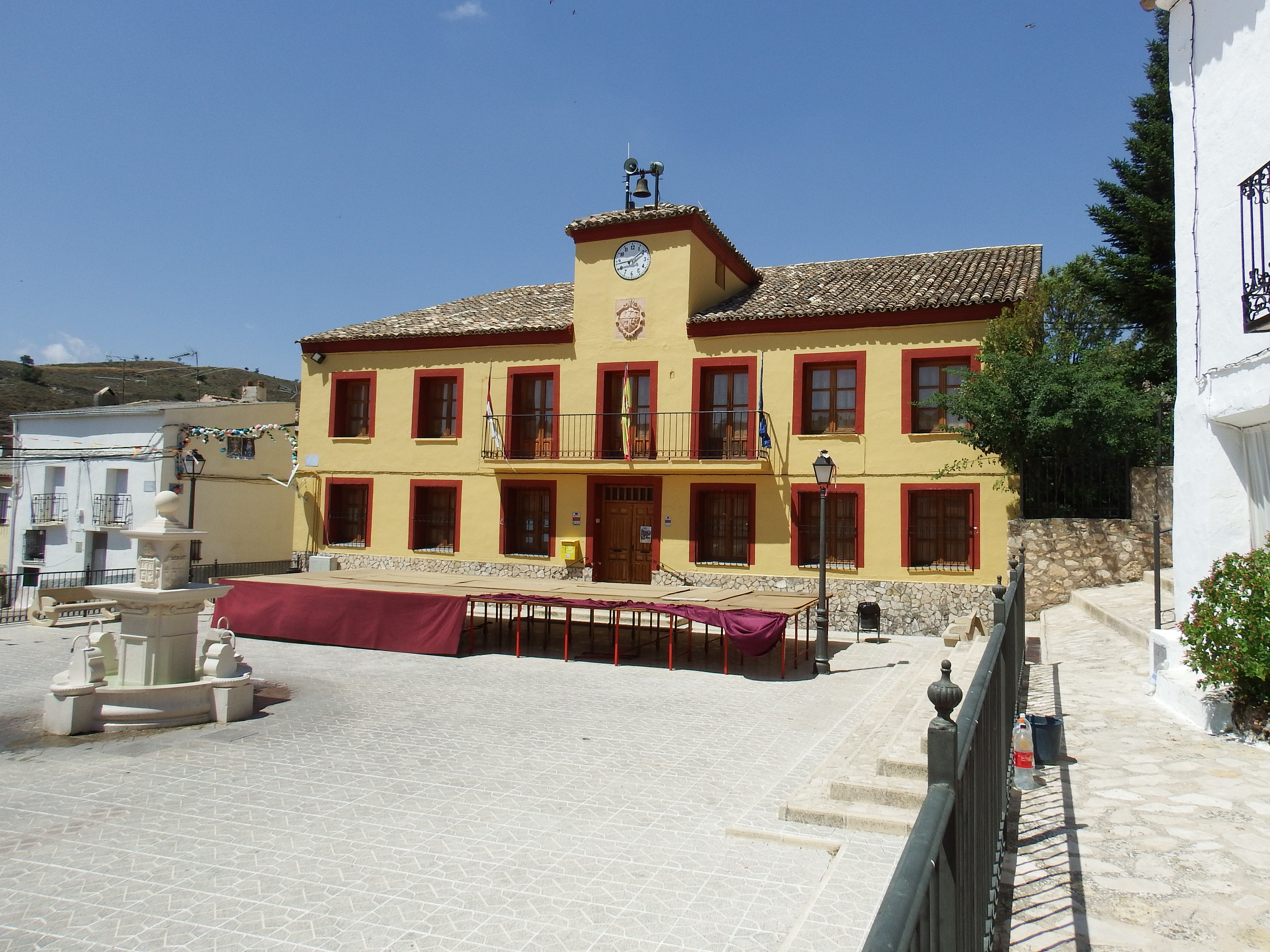
- Town hall of Pineda de Gigüela

- Location within Spain Location within Castilla-La Mancha
- Coordinates: 40°05′N 2°33′W
- Country: Spain
- Autonomous community: Castile-La Mancha
- Province: Cuenca
- Municipality: Pineda de Gigüela

Area
  - Total: 28 km^{2} (11 sq mi)

Population (2025-01-01)
  - Total: 58
  - Density: 2.1/km^{2} (5.4/sq mi)
- Time zone: UTC+1 (CET)
  - Summer (DST): UTC+2 (CEST)

Pineda de Gigüela is a municipality located in the province of Cuenca, Castile-La Mancha, Spain. According to the 2004 census (INE), the municipality has a population of 137 inhabitants.
