= José Antonio Pineda =

Salvadoran poet, actor and author

José Antonio Pineda is a Salvadoran poet, actor and author. In interviews Pineda reflects that he was a co-founder of the Straight Theatre in Haight Ashbury in San Francisco in the 1960s.

Pineda sings mostly rhythm and blues tunes in various bands in South East Asia mostly with 'the beatniks' as Frisco Tony & the Beatniks. Neo-beat poet Pineda sometimes combines poetry reading and performance as a blues singer, specializing in American roots music.

== Youth ==
Pineda was born in El Salvador, his parents emigrated to the United States. His father drove trucks, his mother, a teacher in El Salvador did menial jobs because of lack of language skills. His family, two sisters and two brothers lived in an Hispanic neighborhood.

He attended a local Jesuit school, but was dismissed from it in his final year saying later that 'Jesuits and the Beat poets did not have a symbiotic relationship' further saying later that, 'I defected to the Beat movement.' In those days in San Francisco, the Straight Theatre in the Haight area was a central meeting point for artist types, and Pineda acted in small plays, did some Flamenco dancing and was part of the ‘psychedelic scene’. 'My roots are in alternative culture, in particular the psychedelic underground'.

Pineda moved to Spain and Madrid in the 1970s to study dance saying later that he 'rediscovered symbolism and surrealism' during that period. Eventually moving back to the U.S., he later resided in Southeast Asia, writing, acting and giving readings of his poetry.

== Novelist, writer ==
The novel The Magick Papers by Antonio Pineda was published in 2004. Linda Kelly published 3 works by Antonio Pineda in the Sam Francisco Haight Street Voice Beat Poet Michael McClure & Jim Morrison, The Wilde, Wycked, and Wonderful World of Mark McCloud, and Shaman.

Dr Simon Warner author & editor of Rock & Beat Generation published Pineda’s articles-stories- Re the Grateful Dead and on Beat poets: Neal Cassady, Michael McClure Jim Morrison- Richard Brautigan- Al Winans & Ken Kesey. Warner also published his stories on underground film director Kenneth Anger and a three part series on cinema director David Winters. Pineda’s poetry has been published as a Coda -tribute to the aforementioned artists by Warner -who describes Winter's life during these times as a high octane milieu where hot actors, ground breaking poets and musicians- brilliant hoofers and film directors starred. He sees Pineda's account a mesmerizing mile-a-minute account of California calls.

== Actor, films ==
Pineda had a role in the movie Teddy Bear, in which he shared scenes with one of the lead actors. Pineda was cast in the film Clash of the Empires, filmed in Cambodia and appeared in the movie as "King Korm" with fellow actor Christopher Judge.

In the film (The King Maker) David Winters 'cast me as Don Vincente dancing to the music of Bach and Vivaldi.'

The IMDb (The Internet Movie Database) credits Pineda with performances in their filmography, (3 titles) the 2011 production of Dark Bridge playing Dr. Marquez, 2010 The Lazarus Papers where he played a bar patron and 2005 The King Maker, playing Don Vincenti

British musician Simon Whetham performed in June 2012 at Meta House in Phnom Penh creating a site-specific work. Whetham was joined by 'beat poet, author and spoken word artist' Antonio Pineda.
