= Arnel Pineda =

Filipino singer

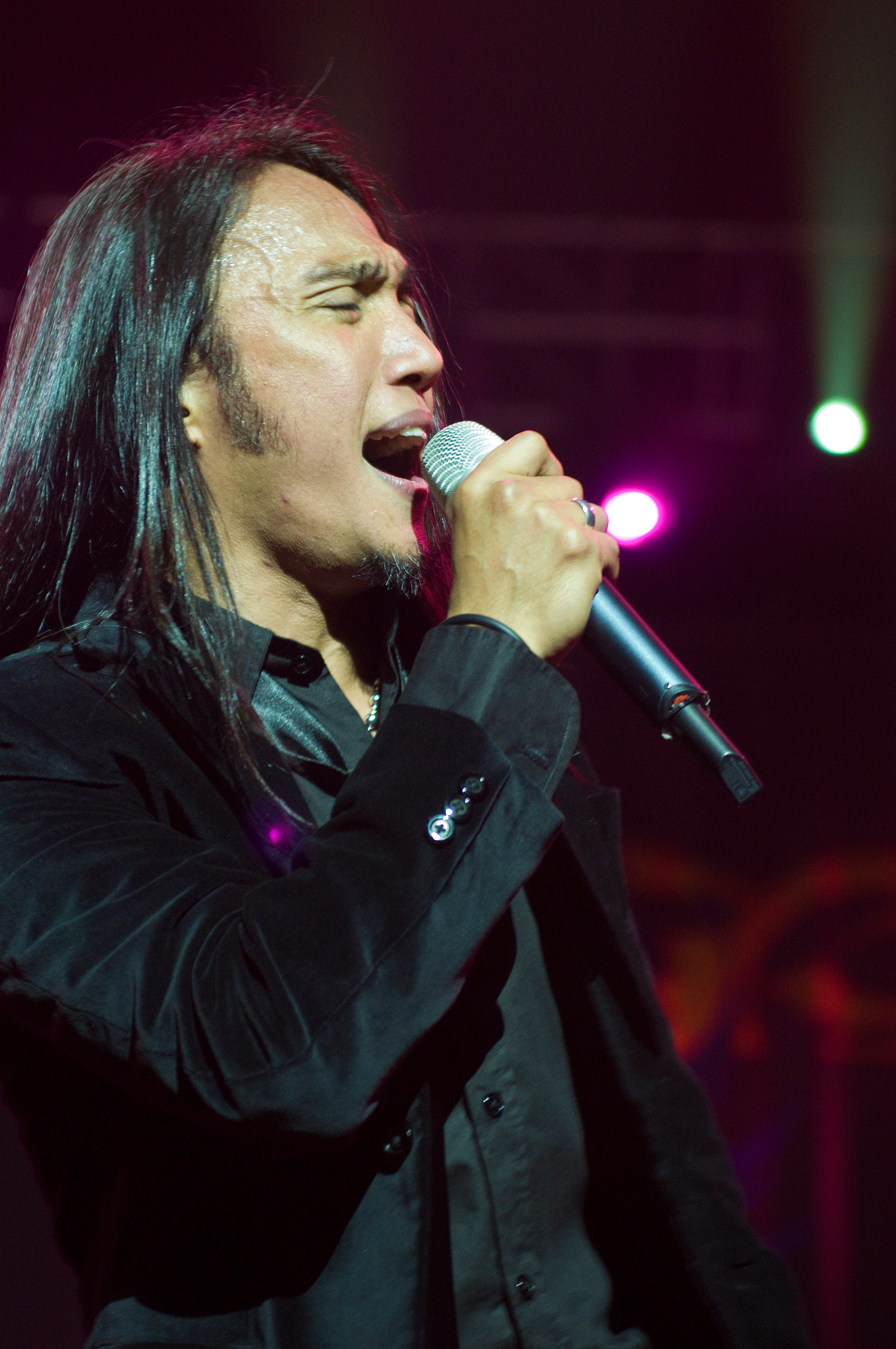
- Pineda performing in 2009

Background information
- Born: Arnel Campaner Pineda; September 5, 1967 (age 59); Tondo, Manila, Philippines
- Origin: Sampaloc, Manila, Philippines
- Genres: Rock; hard rock; soft rock; OPM
- Occupations: Singer, songwriter
- Years active: 1982–present
- Labels: Universal; Capitol Records
- Member of: Journey
- Formerly of: Ijos Band; Amo; New Age; Most W@nted; The Zoo
- Spouse: Cherry Pineda (m. 2001)
- Website: arnelpineda.com

Arnel Campaner Pineda (born September 5, 1967) is a Filipino singer and songwriter. He came to prominence in the Philippines during the 1980s and internationally in 2007 as the lead singer of the American rock band Journey.

== Early life ==
Arnel Pineda was born on September 5, 1967, at St. Jude Thaddeus Diagnostic Clinic in Tondo, Manila, to Restituto Lising Pineda and Josefina Manansala Campaner. His mother instilled his love for singing at an early age, encouraging him to sing along to her favorite acts like Karen Carpenter and Barbra Streisand. Growing up, his parents entered him in many singing contests.

His mother, who was suffering from heart disease, died when he was 13 years old. Her illness left their family deep in medical debt. Being more than six months behind on their apartment rent and unable to sufficiently provide for the family, his father moved out and asked relatives to take in Pineda's siblings. To ease his father's burden, Pineda quit school to work.

He spent about two years homeless, sleeping wherever he could like public parks or on a narrow bench outside a friend's crowded house. He earned a meager living by collecting glass bottles, newspapers and scrap metal and selling them to recyclers. He would also go to the pier with his friends and take on odd jobs like cleaning scrap metal and docked ships. He didn't have much to eat, sometimes rationing a small package of Marie biscuit as food for two days.

== Career ==
In 1982, when Pineda was 15 years old, he became the lead singer of the Filipino group Ijos. He used to sing at a Shakey's Pizza parlor on Taft Street in Manila. In 1986, several members of Ijos formed a group called Amo, which won the Rock Wars contest in the Philippines.

In 1988, Amo won the Philippine leg of the Yamaha World Band Explosion. They went to the finals in Hong Kong, but were not qualified to win due to a technicality. The rules said the winning song had to be an original composition, but also that the song entry in the finals had to be the same song with which the band won their country's leg of the competition. Amo's winning song in the Philippines was Queen's "Bohemian Rhapsody". After the contest, the band continued as Amo, performing live. They opened for Robert Palmer in Manila in 1989. Amo played in clubs in Quezon City, Olongapo and Makati in Luzon, the biggest island in the Philippines. Amo was very popular in the Chinese-owned California Jam club in Olongapo, which was frequented by U.S. military personnel.

In 1990, Pineda and other members of Amo formed another band called Intensity Five and again entered the Yamaha World Band Explosion. Pineda won Best Vocalist and the band came in as first runner-up.

Later in 1990, five of Amo's original members split from the band leader, Ulysis Ablang, to form another band behind Pineda, New Age. This occurred prior to the release of Amo's only album released in 1990 titled Ang Tunay na Amo ("The Real Master"), on BMG records which spawned one popular radio hit "Running Away". (The song gained recognition in 2006 by another Filipino artist Erik Santos, who won a Filipino TV talent show, Star in a Million.) The remaining members of Amo went on to form Boss Band, while Pineda's New Age played regularly at Fire and Rain in Makati.

During a performance in 1991, a talent agent spotted Pineda and New Age and asked them to move to Hong Kong to perform at a popular entertainment restaurant called Grammy's. With New Age, Pineda performed six nights a week Tuesday through Sunday for several years. After a long-term relationship failed in 1994, Pineda suffered health problems that almost destroyed his voice. He returned to the Philippines. After six months of recuperation, he was able to sing again. He returned to Hong Kong and resumed singing with his band. In 1998, the owner of Igor's, a horror-themed restaurant and nightclub in Hong Kong, asked New Age to perform there. Dressed in skeleton outfits, they called themselves The Rolling Bones.

In 1999, Pineda caught the attention of the Warner Bros. record label and flew back to the Philippines on his days off to record the self-titled solo album Arnel Pineda. Most of the album's ten original songs were slow ballads, with only two upbeat numbers, one of which carried a Latin style. One of the songs, "Iiyak Ka Rin" ("You Will Cry Too") became a karaoke favorite in Asia, while another, "Sayang" ("Too Bad"), became a radio favorite. Pineda wrote and arranged several of the songs. He continued to perform with New Age while making his album and for several years after. In 2001, Pineda sang one song, "Looking Glass", with Filipino band South Border on their album The Way We Do. Earlier that year, he formed a new band, eventually called 9mm, and played at the city's top bars including the Hard Rock Cafe in Makati. The band played a three-month stint at The Edge in Lan Kwai Fong, Hong Kong, in 2002.

In 2004, three members of New Age reformed with a female singer sharing lead vocals with Pineda and called themselves Most W@nted. This band played sets of three to four hours Monday through Saturday at The Cavern Club in Hong Kong. On their only day off, Sunday, the band often performed at Filipino community events.

In 2005, Pineda recorded the theme song of the short-lived Filipino radio show Dayo. The band Visitors was briefly formed for promotion purposes of the Dayo soundtrack consisting of three members from Ijos/Yjoz, Amo, New Age and Most W@nted.

=== The Zoo ===
In 2006, encouraged by well-respected Filipino talent manager and TV director Bert de Leon, Pineda moved back to the Philippines with Monet Cajipe, the guitarist who had been in all of Pineda's previous bands. They formed The Zoo with Emil Bondoc on bass, Edgar Mendoza on keyboards, and Mckoy Alcantara on drums. They signed on with de Leon's company, Sundance Entertainment Corp. The Zoo performed several nights a week at clubs in Manila and Olongapo during 2006 and 2007. Shows regularly spanned 3–5 hours. The Zoo's first album Zoology was released by MCA Universal in September 2007 featuring 12 original tracks and one cover song ("Pain in My Heart" was originally recorded a decade earlier by Second Wind), five of which were penned by Pineda, and another was co-written by Pineda and Mark Valliente.

=== Journey ===
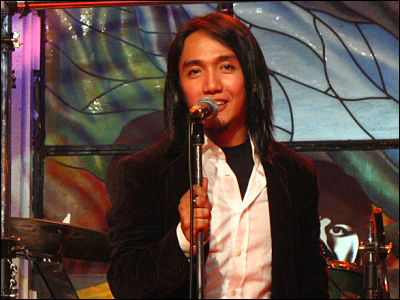
Pineda in 2008

Videos of The Zoo performing cover songs by Journey, Survivor, Aerosmith, Led Zeppelin, The Eagles, Stryper and other popular acts from the 1970s, 1980s and 1990s began appearing on YouTube in February 2007. On June 28, 2007, Neal Schon of Journey contacted Noel Gomez, a longtime fan and friend of Pineda who had uploaded many of these videos, to ask for Pineda's contact information. Schon sent an e-mail to Pineda inviting him to audition for Journey. Pineda initially dismissed the e-mail as a hoax, but after being persuaded by Gomez, he finally replied to Schon's e-mail. Ten minutes later, Pineda received a phone call from Schon. On August 12, Pineda, along with his manager Bert de Leon, flew to Marin County, just north of San Francisco, for a week of auditioning. The star-struck Pineda was welcomed warmly but he described the audition as "nerve-wracking, tense". On December 5, 2007, Pineda was announced as the new lead singer of Journey.

Pineda debuted as the lead singer of Journey on February 21, 2008, at the Viña del Mar International Song Festival held at the Quinta Vergara Amphitheater in Viña del Mar, Chile.

Chilean media acclaimed Pineda's performance (translated to English): "The new vocalist fits very well with the band, his vocal aptitudes shining through, which are very similar to the legendary musician of the band, Steve Perry." Journey keyboardist/guitarist Jonathan Cain described Pineda's performance in a radio interview: "We went to Chile just recently, where we had never played and they went crazy, they absolutely went nuts... Arnel's first show—talk about a stressful thing—we had a televised concert for 25 million people... Is the guy a winner? Yeah, he's a winner. He's a clutch player."

Journey returned to the United States for a private RE/MAX Convention event at the MGM Grand in Las Vegas, Nevada, on March 6, 2008, then performed at Las Vegas' Planet Hollywood on March 8, 2008 (this concert was recorded and used, in part, for the Revelation DVD).

On February 1, 2009, he performed with Journey at the Super Bowl XLIII pregame show.

==== Revelation album and tour ====
Journey's first album with Pineda, Revelation, debuted at No. 5 in the Billboard Top 200 album charts in the week following its release (released June 3, 2008), and remained in the Top 20 for six weeks. It was certified gold by the RIAA with more than 336,000 units sold within the first few days. It achieved platinum status by October 1, 2009.

The US version of the album (distributed exclusively through Wal-Mart) consists of ten new songs ("Faith in the Heartland" was co-written and originally recorded by vocalist Steve Augeri and S. Augeri is credited as songwriter in the liner notes of this album) and 12 re-recorded classics, plus a live-in-concert DVD filmed during the March 8, 2008, concert in Las Vegas. The European version distributed through Frontiers Records contains 11 new songs, 11 re-recorded classics, plus one new bonus track, but does not include the DVD. All of the music on Revelation was produced by Kevin Shirley (who previously worked with Journey on their Platinum-certified Trial by Fire album).

Jonathan Cain described the album in an interview:

We recorded our greatest hits with our brand new singer from the Philippines, Arnel Pineda, and it's unbelievable when you listen to it. We paid a lot of attention to the details because everybody loves those hits and we weren't about to step all over it... We're excited because we think Arnel is the future for our franchise... We knew that if we were ever gonna move on, we had to get somebody that was really gonna be our future and sound like Journey is supposed to sound... I think Journey fans are in for a real treat.

In an interview soon after Pineda joined the band, Neal Schon said:

We feel reborn. I think there's a lot of chemistry among the five of us. At first we were going to go into the studio and just write 4 songs, but now it's escalated to a lot of great new and diverse material. The stuff sounds tremendous. Everyone's so stoked about it. We feel very fortunate to have found Arnel.

Journey's 2008 tour accompanying the release of Revelation began on June 8, 2008, in Spain, followed by four dates in Germany, and one date in the Netherlands. Journey toured the United Kingdom and Ireland from June 17 through June 28, 2008. The US tour (with Heart and Cheap Trick) began on July 9, 2008, in Denver, Colorado, and continued through October 4, 2008, in Albuquerque, New Mexico. Many dates were already sold out well in advance. Pineda celebrated his 41st birthday on September 5, 2008, during a concert at the Molson Amphitheatre in Toronto, Ontario. In September 2008, Journey performed back-to-back sold-out concerts at the Greek Theatre in Los Angeles. Pineda sang in 57 concerts during the 2008 Journey World Tour. Journey's recent visit to the United States Gulf Coast performing at the Wharf Amphitheater, Orange Beach, Alabama, and at the Pensacola Civic Center, Pensacola, Florida, was a tremendous hit due to the large Filipino communities living in that area.

On the second leg of the tour, Journey went on an Asian–Hawaiian tour, going to cities in Japan, the Philippines, China and Hawaii. The Manila concert was released as a live concert DVD. Total concert revenue for Journey in 2008 was $35,695,481.

Pineda apologized for his poor vocal performance at the Rock in Rio music festival. Behind the Songs posted an FB clip of his struggle to reach the high notes of "Don't Stop Believin'" on September 21, 2023. He conditionally offered to quit Journey.

== Personal life ==
Pineda married Cherry Pineda in 2001. They have a son and a daughter. Pineda also has two older sons. In 2013, Pineda told Rappler that he divides his time between the Philippines and the United States.

Pineda met Donald Trump at the White House in 2017 with two other members of Journey, Jonathan Cain and Ross Valory. The move was strongly criticised by the group's guitarist Neal Schon. Pineda later explained that he does not belong to any political group, nor does he follow any religion.

== Filmography ==
Year	Title	Role	Production
2012	Don't Stop Believin': Everyman's Journey	Himself	Tribeca Film Festival

== Television appearances ==
- Protégé: The Battle for the Big Break (Mentor of Nomer Limatog – replacement of Rachelle Ann Go) (GMA Network)
- ASAP (Co-host; 2008–present) (ABS-CBN)
- Simply KC (Guest) (ABS-CBN)
- Showtime (Guest judge) (ABS-CBN)
- Eat Bulaga! (Guest) (GMA Network)
- Boy and Kris (Guest) (ABS-CBN)
- The Ellen DeGeneres Show (Guest with Journey)
- CBS Early Show (Guest with Journey) (CBS)
- The Oprah Winfrey Show (Guest with Journey)
- NBC Today Show (Guest with Journey)
- Sarah G. Live (Himself/Guest) (ABS-CBN)
- May Bukas Pa (Himself) (ABS-CBN)
- The Voice of the Philippines (Guest Adviser) (ABS-CBN)
- Prudential of Cha-Ching (Himself/Guest) (Cartoon Network Asia)

== Discography ==
=== Solo albums ===
- Arnel Pineda (1999)
- Sounds of Christmas - EP (2015)
- AP (2016)

=== with The Zoo ===
- Zoology (2007)

=== with Journey ===
- Revelation (2008)
- Journey: Live in Manila DVD (2009)
- Eclipse (2011)
- Escape & Frontiers Live in Japan (2019)
- Freedom (2022)
- Live in Concert at Lollapalooza (2022)

=== Guest appearances ===
- Earl Romielle Salinas – The Way We Do (track "Looking Glass") (2001)
- Revolution Saints – Revolution Saints (2015)
- Marc Martel – Hark! EP (2021)

== Awards ==
Year	Award-Giving Body	Category	Work	Result
2009	GMMSF Box-Office Entertainment Awards	Outstanding Global Achievement by a Filipino Artist (with Charice)		Won
