= Kim Carnes discography =

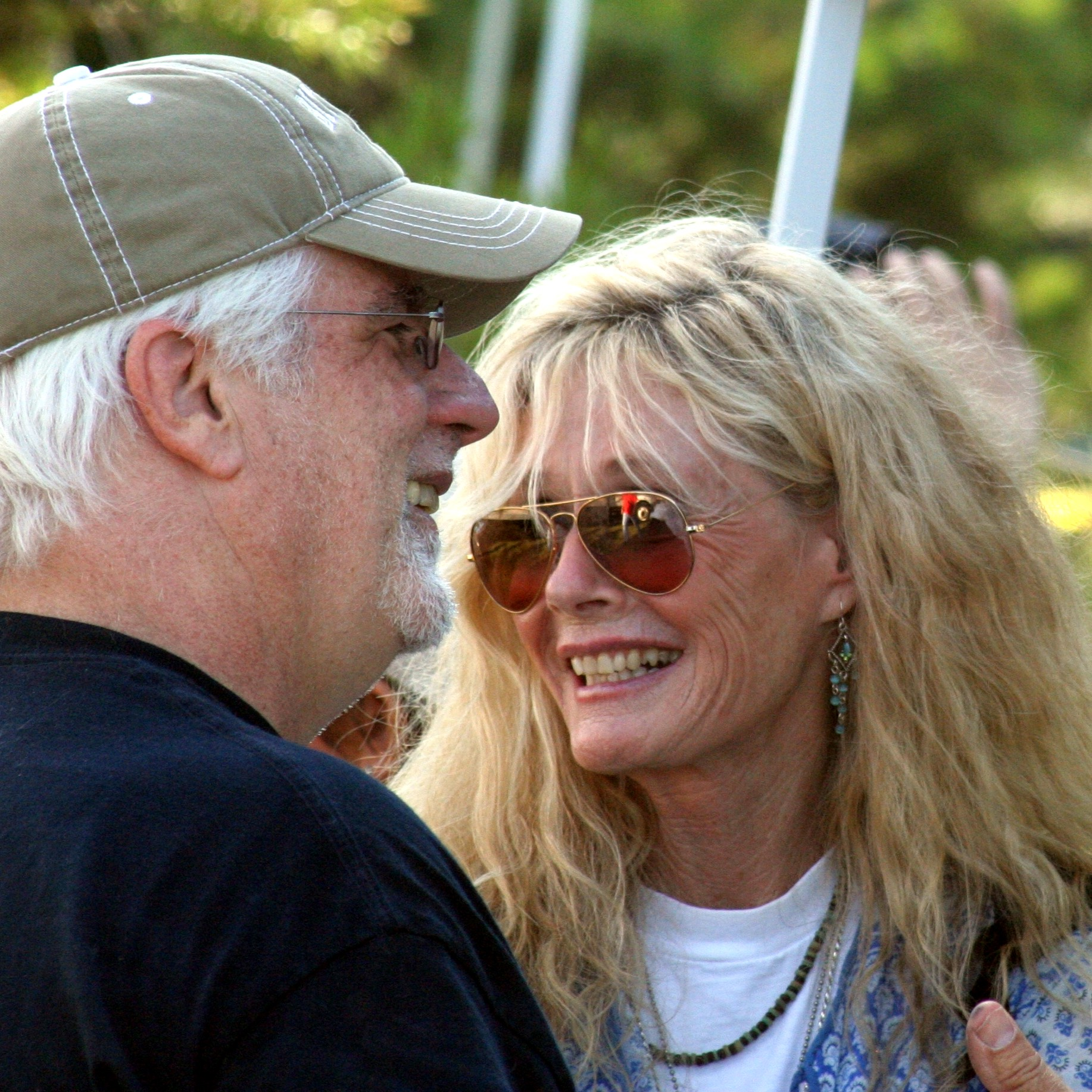
- Carnes and Michael McDonald in 2008
- Studio albums: 13
- Soundtrack albums: 3
- Live albums: 1
- Compilation albums: 5
- Singles: 48
- Music videos: 14

American singer-songwriter Kim Carnes has released 13 studio albums, one live album, five compilation albums, and 48 singles (including seven as a featured artist). She signed with Amos Records in 1971 and released her debut album Rest on Me in the same year. Her self-titled second album was released in the following year. Kim Carnes yielded one single, "You're a Part of Me", which became Carnes' first charting title. The song reached No. 32 on the Billboard Adult Contemporary chart. None of Carnes's albums charted until the release of her fifth studio album Romance Dance (1980). The album peaked at No. 57 on the Billboard 200, No. 77 on the Canadian Albums Chart and No. 89 on the Australian Albums Chart. Romance Dance produced two hit singles; the Smokey Robinson and the Miracles cover "More Love", which made the top 10 of the Billboard Hot 100, peaking at No. 10, and "Cry Like a Baby", which peaked right outside of the top 40, at No. 44.

Carnes' success peaked with the release of Mistaken Identity (1981), which reached No. 1 on the Billboard 200, and certified platinum by the Recording Industry Association of America (RIAA). The album's lead single "Bette Davis Eyes" was an international success, reaching No. 1 on the Billboard Hot 100 and in several other countries. Carnes' follow-up album Voyeur saw moderate success, with the title track reaching No. 29 on the Billboard Hot 100, while the second single "Does It Make You Remember" reached No. 36.

Carnes released three more albums, Café Racers (1983), Barking at Airplanes (1985) and Light House (1986), before failing to chart on the Billboard 200 again. The most successful single releases on the Billboard Hot 100 from these albums were "Invisible Hands" (No. 40), "You Make My Heart Beat Faster (and That's All That Matters)" (No. 54), and "Crazy in the Night (Barking at Airplanes)" (No. 15). Carnes permanently relocated to Nashville after the release of View from the House (1988); its lead single, "Crazy in Love", reached No. 13 on the Billboard Adult Contemporary chart. Her last two albums, Checkin' Out the Ghosts (1991) and Chasin' Wild Trains (2004), failed to chart worldwide.

== Albums ==
=== Studio albums ===
List of studio albums, with selected chart positions and certifications
Title	Details	Peak chart positions							Certifications
Title	Details	US	US Country	AUS	CAN	GER	NZ	UK	Certifications
Rest on Me	Released: 1971; Label: Amos; Formats: LP, 8-track, Cassette	—	—	—	—	—	—	—	
Kim Carnes	Released: 1975; Label: A&M; Format: LP, 8-track, Cassette	—	—	—	—	—	—	—	
Sailin'	Released: 1976; Label: A&M; Format: LP, 8-track, Cassette	—	—	—	—	—	—	—	
St. Vincent's Court	Released: February 1979; Label: EMI America; Formats: LP, 8-track, Cassette	206	—	—	—	—	—	—	
Romance Dance	Released: June 2, 1980; Label: EMI America; Formats: LP, 8-track, Cassette	57	—	89	77	—	—	—	
Mistaken Identity	Released: April 1981; Label: EMI America; Formats: CD, LP, 8-track, Cassette	1	—	2	4	3	1	26	RIAA: Platinum; MC: 3× Platinum; NZ: Gold
Voyeur	Released: September 8, 1982; Label: EMI America; Formats: CD, LP, 8-track, Cassette	49	—	21	26	—	26	—	MC: Gold
Café Racers	Released: October 1983; Label: EMI America; Formats: CD, LP, Cassette	97	—	—	—	—	—	—	
Barking at Airplanes	Released: May 29, 1985; Label: EMI America; Formats: CD, LP, Cassette	48	—	40	59	—	24	—	
Light House	Released: May 26, 1986; Label: EMI America; Formats: CD, LP, Cassette	116	—	—	—	—	—	—	
View from the House	Released: July 25, 1988; Label: MCA; Formats: CD, LP, Cassette	—	36	—	—	—	—	—	
Checkin' Out the Ghosts	Released: March 21, 1991; Label: Zebrazone; Format: CD	—	—	—	—	—	—	—	
Chasin' Wild Trains	Released: 2004; Label: Sparky Dawg; Format: CD	—	—	—	—	—	—	—	
"—" denotes a recording that did not chart or was not released in that territory.

=== Live albums ===
Title	Details
Live at Savoy, 1981	Released: May 19, 1998; Label: King Biscuit Flower Hour; Format: CD

=== Compilation albums ===
Title	Details
The Best of You	Released: 1982; Label: A & M; Format: Vinyl, Cassette
The Classic Collection	Released: 1987; Label: J & B; Format: Vinyl, CD, Cassette
Crazy in the Night	Released: 1990; Label: Capitol; Format: CD, Cassette
Gypsy Honeymoon: The Best of Kim Carnes	Released: 1993; Label: Capitol; Formats: CD, Cassette, digital download
To Love Somebody	Released: 1996; Label: Razamataz, MasterTone; Format: CD
The Best of Kim Carnes	Released: October 10, 2005; Label: EMI; Format: CD
Essential	Released: 2011; Label: EMI; Formats: CD, digital download

== Singles ==
=== As lead artist ===
List of singles as lead artist, with selected chart positions
Title	Year	Peak chart positions										Certifications	Album
Title	Year	US	US AC	US Country	US Dance	AUS	CAN	GER	NL	NZ	UK	Certifications	Album
"I Won't Call You Back"	1971	—	—	—	—	—	—	—	—	—	—		Rest on Me
"To Love Somebody"	1971	—	—	—	—	—	—	—	—	—	—		Rest on Me
"It's Love That Keeps It All Together" (with Dave Ellingson)	1971	—	—	—	—	—	—	—	—	—	—		Non-album single
"Somewhere in the Night"	1975	—	—	—	—	—	—	—	—	—	—		Kim Carnes
"You're a Part of Me"	1975	—	36	—	—	—	—	—	—	—	—		Kim Carnes
"Bad Seed"	1976	—	—	—	—	—	—	—	—	—	—		Kim Carnes
"Last Thing You Ever Wanted to Do"	1977	—	—	—	—	—	—	—	—	—	—		Sailin'
"Sailin'"	1977	—	—	—	—	—	—	—	—	—	—		Sailin'
"Lose in Love"	1979	—	—	—	—	—	—	—	—	—	—		St. Vincent's Court
"It Hurts So Bad"	1979	56	—	—	—	79	—	—	—	—	—		St. Vincent's Court
"What Am I Gonna Do"	1979	—	—	—	—	—	—	—	—	—	—		St. Vincent's Court
"More Love"	1980	10	6	—	—	46	13	—	—	—	—		Romance Dance
"Cry Like a Baby"	1980	44	—	—	—	—	—	—	—	—	—		Romance Dance
"Bette Davis Eyes"	1981	1	15	—	26	1	2	1	17	2	10	RIAA: Gold; BPI: Platinum; MC: Platinum	Mistaken Identity
"Draw of the Cards"	1981	28	—	—	—	64	42	35	—	12	49		Mistaken Identity
"Mistaken Identity"	1981	60	—	—	—	—	—	—	—	—	—		Mistaken Identity
"Voyeur"	1982	29	—	—	52	30	23	45	—	32	68		Voyeur
"Does It Make You Remember"	1982	36	—	—	—	—	—	—	—	—	—		Voyeur
"Say You Don't Know Me"	1983	—	—	—	—	—	—	—	—	—	—		Voyeur
"Invisible Hands"	1983	40	—	—	—	—	44	—	—	—	—		Café Racers
"The Universal Song"	1984	—	—	—	—	—	—	40	—	—	—		Café Racers
"You Make My Heart Beat Faster (And That's All That Matters)"	1984	54	—	—	15	—	—	—	—	—	—		Café Racers
"I Pretend"	1984	74	9	—	—	—	—	—	—	—	—		Café Racers
"Hurricane"	1984	—	—	—	16	—	—	—	—	—	—		Café Racers
"Invitation to Dance"	1985	68	32	—	13	—	—	—	—	—	—		That's Dancing! soundtrack
"Crazy in the Night (Barking at Airplanes)"	1985	15	—	—	24	21	18	—	—	11	—		Barking at Airplanes
"Abadabadango"	1985	67	—	—	—	—	—	—	—	—	—		Barking at Airplanes
"Rough Edges"	1985	—	—	—	—	—	—	—	—	—	—		Barking at Airplanes
"Divided Hearts"	1986	79	—	—	—	—	—	—	—	—	—		Light House
"I'd Lie to You for Your Love"	1986	—	—	—	—	—	—	—	—	—	—		Light House
"Speed of the Sound of Loneliness"	1988	—	—	70	—	—	—	—	—	—	—		View from the House
"Crazy in Love"	1988	—	13	68	—	—	—	—	—	—	—		View from the House
"Just to Spend Tonight with You"	1988	—	—	—	—	—	—	—	—	—	—		View from the House
"Fantastic Fire of Love"	1989	—	—	—	—	—	—	—	—	—	—		View from the House
"Everybody Needs Someone"	1990	—	—	—	—	—	—	—	—	—	—		Impulse soundtrack
"Independent Girl"	1991	—	—	—	—	—	—	—	—	—	—		Checkin' Out the Ghosts
"Working Girl"	1992	—	—	—	—	—	—	—	—	—	—		Tycoon soundtrack
"Gypsy Honeymoon"	1993	—	—	—	—	—	79	65	—	—	—		Gypsy Honeymoon: The Best of Kim Carnes
"Don't Cry Now"	1993	—	—	—	—	—	—	—	—	—	—		Gypsy Honeymoon: The Best of Kim Carnes
"One Beat at a Time"	2004	—	—	—	—	—	—	—	—	—	—		Chasin' Wild Trains
"Just to See You Smile"	2004	—	—	—	—	—	—	—	—	—	—		Chasin' Wild Trains
"Under My Thumb"	2015	—	—	—	—	—	—	—	—	—	—		80's Re:Covered
"—" denotes a recording that did not chart or was not released in that territory.

=== As guest artist ===
List of singles as featured artist, with selected chart positions
Title	Year	Peak chart positions							Album
Title	Year	US	US AC	US Country	AUS	CAN	NZ	UK	Album
"Winds of Nowhere" (promo only) (Bob and Kim)	1966	—	—	—	—	—	—	—	Non-album single
"You're a Part of Me" (Gene Cotton with Kim Carnes)	1978	36	6	—	—	—	—	—	Save the Dancer
"Don't Fall in Love with a Dreamer" (Kenny Rogers with Kim Carnes)	1980	4	2	3	38	3	31	—	Gideon
"Deep Inside My Heart" (Randy Meisner -- Carnes sings a prominent but uncredited backing vocal)	1980	22	—	—	—	12	—	—	One More Song
"What About Me?" (Kenny Rogers with James Ingram and Kim Carnes)	1984	15	1	70	49	18	25	92	What About Me?
"Make No Mistake, He's Mine" (Barbra Streisand with Kim Carnes)	1984	51	8	—	—	89	—	92	Emotion
"Hooked on the Memory of You" (Neil Diamond with Kim Carnes)	1992	—	23	—	116	—	—	—	Lovescape
"—" denotes a recording that did not chart or was not released in that territory.

== Soundtracks and other appearances ==
Year	Title	Album/Single
1971	"Nobody Knows" (as Kim and Dave)	Vanishing Point soundtrack
1971	"All of My Life"	Presenting The Sugar Bears
1971	"Feather Balloon"	Presenting The Sugar Bears
1971	"It's a Good Day"	Presenting The Sugar Bears
1982	"Stay with Me" (Rod Stewart with Kim Carnes and Tina Turner)	Absolutely Live
1983	"I'll Be Here Where the Heart Is"	Flashdance soundtrack
1985	"We Are the World" (USA for Africa)	We Are the World
1987	"The Heart Must Have a Home"	Summer Heat soundtrack
1987	"My Heart Has a Mind of Its Own" (with Jeffrey Osborne)	Spaceballs: The Soundtrack
1989	"Comin' Home"	Rude Awakening soundtrack
1991	"Hold Me"	Romantique – Seiko Ballads
1992	"Heartbreak Hotel" (with Neil Diamond)	The Greatest Hits: 1966–1992
1992	"Hard Times for Lovers" (with Neil Diamond)	Hooked on the Memory of You (single)
1992	"Shiny Day"	Re-Import (Guide of the Japanese Music)
1993	"Love Hurts"	Original Soundtrack - Private Lessons
1994	"Skyline" (with B.J. Thomas and Brian Mitchell)	Lunch: A Modern Musical Myth
1997	"Bad, Bad Leroy Brown"	Jim Croce: A Nashville Tribute
2000	"Who Do You Love" (with Dave Pardue)	Mrs Lightning's Valentine
2005	"Silver Cord"	Loggerheads soundtrack
2005	"You Made My Skin Burn" (from her album Chasin' Wild Trains)	The Amateurs soundtrack
2007	"It's Clear Sky Again Today"	Songs from L.A. (Noriyuki Makihara album)
2007	"Tumbling Dice" (with Jill Johnson)	Music Row
2016	"To Be with You Again"	Frankie Miller's Double Take

== Music videos ==
Year	Title	Director
1979	"What Am I Gonna Do?"	
1979	"Stay Away"	
1980	"More Love"	
1981	"Bette Davis Eyes"	Russell Mulcahy
1981	"Draw of the Cards"	Russell Mulcahy
1982	"Voyeur"	Russell Mulcahy
1982	"Does It Make You Remember"	Simon Milne
1983	"Say You Don't Know Me"	Russell Mulcahy
1983	"Invisible Hands"	James "Jim" Yukich
1984	"You Make My Heart Beat Faster (And That's All That Matters)"	Leslie Libman
1984	"The Universal Song"	
1985	"Crazy in the Night (Barking at Airplanes)"	Dominic Sena, Greg Gold
1985	"Abadabadango"	Dominic Sena, Greg Gold
1985	"Invitation to Dance"	Mary Lambert
1986	"Divided Hearts"	Russell Mulcahy
1988	"Crazy in Love"	Matt Mahurin
1991	"Hooked on the Memory of You"	
