= Chasin' Wild Trains =

Studio album by Kim Carnes
- Released: 2004
- Recorded: 2004
- Studio: Dogwood Studio, Green Wagon Studio, OmniSound Studios, Rangewire Studio, Sound Emporium and The Electric Sandbox (Nashville, TN)
- Genre: Americana
- Length: 56:24
- Label: Sparky Dawg Music; CoraZong
- Producer: Kim Carnes; Angelo Petraglia; Chuck Prophet; Matraca Berg

Kim Carnes chronology
Live at Savoy, 1981 (1999)	Chasin' Wild Trains (2004)

Singles from Chasin' Wild Trains
- 1. "One Beat at a Time" Released: September 5, 2005; 2. "Just to See You Smile" Released: 2006; 3. "Just to See You Smile (Radio Edit)" Released: September 2, 2022; 4. "Lucid Dreams (Radio Edit)" Released: November 25, 2022; 5. "If I Was an Angel (Radio Edit)" Released: March 17, 2023

Chasin' Wild Trains is the thirteenth studio album by American singer-songwriter Kim Carnes. It was her first full-length album since Checkin' Out the Ghosts (1991) and her first internationally released studio album since View from the House (1988). Carnes self-released the album in the United States through Sparky Dawg in 2004, before it received an international release through the Dutch label CoraZong on September 16, 2005.

Carnes produced ten of the twelve tracks, with Angelo Petraglia and Chuck Prophet co-producing "Lucid Dreams" and Matraca Berg co-producing "If I Was an Angel". "One Beat at a Time" and "Just to See You Smile" were both released as singles.

== Writing and production ==
Carnes decided to record Chasin' Wild Trains after writing "One Beat At a Time" with Marc Jordan. "I went in the studio and cut it with my guys," Carnes told PopMatters. "The minute I did it, I thought [it was] time to make an album. This is going to be cut one. Everything has to measure up to this." Carnes described Chasin' Wild Trains as a "rootsy songwriter album" written with her friends and musical collaborators.

Carnes originally co-wrote "If I Was An Angel" with Matraca Berg for her album Sunday Morning to Saturday Night (1997). Berg co-produced and sang backing vocals on Carnes' new version for Chasin' Wild Trains.

"Goodnight Angel" was originally written for an unreleased companion album of songs inspired by the 2002 film We Were Soldiers. "You Made My Skin Burn" featured in the soundtrack to the 2006 film The Moguls.

== Release and promotion ==
Carnes self-released Chasin' Wild Trains in 2004 through Sparky Dawg and sold the album to fans at her concerts. On September 16, 2005, the album was released internationally through the Dutch label CoraZong. In the following year, it was released again as a Limited Edition with live acoustic versions of "Bette Davis Eyes" and "Just to See You Smile" as bonus tracks recorded during Carnes' appearance on American Connection, a show broadcast by KRO Radio 2 in 2005. On 9 November 2005, Carnes performed "Bette Davis Eyes" and "Just to See You Smile" live on Des mots de minuit, broadcast by France 2.

The cover art for Chasin' Wild Trains features an image of Carnes taken at age 3 sitting on a toy 'honeymoon' car. She had been playing 'wedding' with her next door neighbor, David Lindley.

"One Beat At a Time" was released as a single on September 5, 2005, and "Just to See You Smile" followed in 2006. In 2022, Carnes began releasing shortened edits of selected tracks as singles, beginning with "Just to See You Smile" on September 3, followed by "Lucid Dreams" on November 25.

== Critical reception ==
Professional ratings
Review scores
Source	Rating
AllMusic	3.5/5 stars
Encyclopedia of Popular Music	3/5 stars
The Tennessean	3/4 stars

Chasin' Wild Trains received overall positive reviews from music critics. Joe Viglione of AllMusic opined that Carnes sounds like "the Eagles going acoustic", echoing the songwriting of Stevie Nicks with songs on the subject of time, dreams and angels.

In The Tennessean, Peter Cooper described the songs on Chasin' Wild Trains as "rich, with memorable melodies" and noted "If I Was an Angel" as the album's highlight. Writing for the Dutch online magazine Kinda Muzik, Jelle Schuilenburg described Chasin' Wild Trains as "simply a beautiful album", featuring songs with "a nice mix of Americana, singer-songwriter and country rock". She compared Carnes' vocals to contemporaries like Lucinda Williams and Melissa Etheridge. In Country Music Today magazine, Stephen L. Betts opined that Chasin' Wild Trains is "one of 2004's best albums in any genre". Dutch website Muziekwereld noted the "sparse solo guitars and atmospheric keys" giving Carnes' "emotional voice more space than the chilly, fashionable production of [the 1980s]". They likened the album's sound to the music of Bonnie Raitt, Van Morrison and John Coltrane, concluding that Carnes "proves how mature pop music can sound." In Break Out, a German music magazine, Birgit Bräckle wrote that Chasin' Wild Trains is a "melancholic" album with "sparsely instrumented songs, infused with Nashville country and blues influences".

== Track listing ==
No.	Title	Writer(s)	Length
1.	"One Beat at a Time"	Kim Carnes; Marc Jordan	3:52
2.	"Just to See You Smile"	Carnes; Angelo Petraglia; Chuck Prophet	4:18
3.	"Where Is the Boy? (Chris' Song)"	Carnes	4:04
4.	"Goodnight Angel"	Carnes	4:53
5.	"Lucid Dreams"	Carnes; Petraglia; Prophet	4:02
6.	"All About Time"	Carnes; Greg Barnhill	3:53
7.	"Runaway"	Carnes; Anders Osborne	4:57
8.	"You Made My Skin Burn"	Carnes; John Goodwin; Billy Panda	4:12
9.	"Still Warmed by the Thrill"	Carnes; Barnhill	4:03
10.	"If I Was an Angel"	Carnes; Matraca Berg; Gary Harrison	3:46
11.	"Too Far Gone"	Carnes; Kim Richey	2:58
12.	"Stepped Right in It"	Carnes; Al Anderson; Jeffrey Steele	3:31

2006 Limited Edition release with CoraZong Records
No.	Title	Writer(s)	Length
13.	"Bette Davis Eyes" (Acoustic Version)	Jackie DeShannon; Donna Weiss	3:41
14.	"Just to See You Smile" (Acoustic Version)	Carnes; Petraglia; Prophet	4:00

== Personnel ==
Credits adapted from liner notes.

=== Musicians ===
- Kim Carnes – lead vocals, backing vocals, keyboards (5, 7)
- Tim Lauer – keyboards (1–4, 6, 8–10), accordion (6, 11), organ (12)
- Billy Panda – guitars (1–3, 6, 8, 9, 11), Ebow (2), bass (2), acoustic guitar (4), electric guitar (12)
- Angelo Petraglia – guitars (2, 5), backing vocals (4)
- Richard Bennett – guitars (3, 6, 8)
- Tom Bukovac – electric guitar (4)
- Chuck Prophet – guitars (5), bass (5), drums (5), backing vocals (5)
- Greg Barnhill – guitars (6), backing vocals (6, 9)
- Anders Osborne – guitars (7), drums (7), backing vocals (7)
- Gary Burnette – guitars (9, 11)
- Jeff Hanna – slide guitar (10)
- Al Anderson – acoustic guitar (12), guitar solo (12), backing vocals (12)
- Alison Prestwood – bass (3, 4, 6, 8)
- Byron House – bass (9, 11)
- Jeffrey Steele – bass (12)
- Greg Morrow – drums (1, 9, 11)
- Craig Krampf – drums (2, 8)
- Tommy Harden – drums (3, 6, 12)
- Dave Ellingson – percussion (6, 12)
- John Catchings – cello (7)
- Tammy Rogers – viola (7), violin (7)
- Jonathan Yudkin – strings (9)
- Matraca Berg – backing vocals (10, 11)
- Kim Richey – backing vocals (11)

=== Production ===
- Kim Carnes – producer
- Angelo Petraglia – producer (5), additional recording
- Chuck Prophet – producer (5)
- Matraca Berg – producer (10)
- Scott Baggett – recording, mixing
- Tim Lauer – additional recording
- Josh Muncy – additional recording, assistant engineer
- Billy Panda – additional recording
- Eric Tonkin – additional recording
- Adam Beard – assistant engineer
- Erik Jaskowiak – assistant engineer
- Jim DeMain – mastering at Yes Master (Nashville, Tennessee)

=== Design ===
- Don Bailey – art direction, design
- Mike Condon – live photography
- Glen Rose – photography

== Release history ==
Release dates and formats for Chasin' Wild Trains
Region	Date	Format(s)	Edition	Label	Ref.
Various	June 14, 2004	CD	Standard	Sparky Dawg Music	
Europe	October 3, 2005	CD	Standard	CoraZong	
Europe	September 16, 2006	CD	Limited Edition	CoraZong	
