= Barking at Airplanes =

1985 studio album by Kim Carnes

Studio album by Kim Carnes
- Released: May 29, 1985
- Recorded: 1985
- Studios: Ocean Way Recording and Galaxy Sound Studios (Hollywood, California); Larrabee Sound Studios (North Hollywood, California); Record One (Los Angeles, California)
- Genre: Pop rock
- Length: 42:46 (original); 56:08 (reissue)
- Label: EMI America
- Producers: Kim Carnes; Bill Cuomo; Duane Hitchings

Kim Carnes chronology
Café Racers (1983)	Barking at Airplanes (1985)	Light House (1986)

Singles from Barking at Airplanes
- 1. "Crazy in the Night (Barking at Airplanes)" Released: April 1985; 2. "Abadabadango" Released: July 1985; 3. "Rough Edges" Released: October 1985; 4. "Bon Voyage" Released: 1985

Barking at Airplanes is the ninth studio album by American singer-songwriter Kim Carnes, released on May 29, 1985, by EMI America Records.

The album spawned two Billboard Hot 100 hit singles; "Crazy in the Night (Barking at Airplanes)" (No. 15) and "Abadabadango" (No. 67). The 2001 reissue includes the Trevor Horn and Geoff Downes written track "I Am a Camera", which was previously recorded by Yes on their 1980 Drama studio album (as "Into the Lens") and by Downes and Horn themselves on the final Buggles studio album, Adventures in Modern Recording (1981).

== Writing and recording ==
Barking at Airplanes is the first studio album Carnes co-produced since St. Vincent's Court (1979). The album is noted by Nashville Scene as the first synth-pop album produced by a woman. Carnes wrote "Don't Pick Up the Phone" and "Crazy in the Night" on an ARP String Ensemble. "Crazy in the Night" was inspired by her son Collin's fear of the dark. The track opens with three loud door knocks followed by Collin saying, "Who is it?". Carnes' writing was inspired by films including Metropolis (1927) and Black Orpheus (1959), with a direct reference to the latter in the track "He Makes the Sun Rise (Orpheus)". "Bon Voyage" features a sample of tannoy announcements recorded at Charles de Gaulle Airport by a staff member at the French branch of EMI.

== Release and promotion ==
Barking at Airplanes was released on May 29, 1985, by EMI America. In 2001, the album was reissued by EMI-Capitol Special Markets with three bonus tracks; a cover version of "Into the Lens" (retitled as "I Am a Camera") by Yes, "Forever" written by Steven Van Zandt, and a demo version of Carnes singing "Make No Mistake, He's Mine". Carnes became aware of this reissue during an interview with Nashville Scene in 2020, and said she never intended for them to be released.

"Crazy in the Night (Barking at Airplanes)" was released as the album's lead single in April 1985. It spent a total of sixteen weeks on the Billboard Hot 100 chart, peaking at no. 15. The song also reached no. 24 on the Dance Club Songs chart and no. 22 on the Cash Box Top 100 Singles chart. The single charted highest in South Africa where it peaked at no. 3. The track received two remixes by Rusty Garner. "Abadabadango" was released as the album's second single in July 1985. It spent four weeks on the Billboard Hot 100 peaking at no. 67. The track received two extended remixes by Rusty Garner and Jack Witherby. "Rough Edges" was released in the US and Canada as the album's third single in October 1985. In the same year, "Bon Voyage" was released as a single exclusively in the Netherlands.

== Critical reception ==
Professional ratings
Review scores
Source	Rating
AllMusic	2.5/5 stars
The Encyclopedia of Popular Music	2/5 stars

In a retrospective review for AllMusic, Stephen Thomas Erlewine described Barking at Airplanes as a "cohesive and consistent album" and her best outing since Mistaken Identity.

People stated that Carnes has "never recorded an album as pleasing as this", noting her "enchanting" voice.

== Track listing ==
No.	Title	Writer(s)	Length
1.	"Crazy in the Night (Barking at Airplanes)"	Kim Carnes	3:35
2.	"One Kiss"	Carnes; Bill Cuomo; Mark Paul	3:32
3.	"Begging for Favors (Learning How Things Work)"	Carnes; Dave Ellingson	4:52
4.	"He Makes the Sun Rise (Orpheus)"	Carnes; Bill Cuomo; Chas Sandford	4:28
5.	"Bon Voyage"	Carnes	4:44
6.	"Don't Pick Up the Phone (Pick Up the Phone)"	Carnes; Cuomo	4:19
7.	"Rough Edges"	Carnes; Dave Ellingson	4:44
8.	"Abadabadango"	Carnes; Ellingson; Duane Hitchings	3:58
9.	"Touch and Go"	Clive Gregson	4:48
10.	"Oliver (Voice on the Radio)"	Kim Carnes	3:46
Total length:			42:46

2001 re-issue
No.	Title	Writer(s)	Length
11.	"I Am a Camera"	Trevor Horn; Geoff Downes	5:11
12.	"Make No Mistake, He's Mine" (solo version)	Kim Carnes	4:13
13.	"Forever"	Steven Van Zandt	3:58
Total length:			55:39

== Personnel ==
- Kim Carnes – lead vocals, backing vocals (1–5, 7–10)
- Bill Cuomo – synthesizers (1, 3, 4, 9), drum programming (1, 2, 6), Kurzweil synthesizer (5, 10), Yamaha DX7 (5, 10), keyboards (6, 7), additional synthesizer (8), Roland JX-3P (10)
- Duane Hitchings – synthesizers (8), Oberheim DMX programming (8)
- Waddy Wachtel – electric guitar (1), backing vocals (1, 6), guitars (2, 6, 8)
- Lindsey Buckingham – guitars (3), lead and backing vocals (3)
- Craig Hull – guitars (3, 9)
- Chas Sanford – guitars (4)
- Ry Cooder – guitars (7)
- Erik Scott – bass (3, 6, 7, 9)
- David Jackson – bass (4)
- Leland Sklar – bass (5, 10)
- Craig Krampf – drum programming (1, 2, 6), backing vocals (1, 6), drums (3, 9, 10), Oberheim DMX (3, 9)
- Gary Mallaber – drums (4)
- Paulinho da Costa – percussion (2, 4, 5, 9)
- Jerry Peterson – saxophone (3, 4, 8, 9)
- Dave Ellingson – backing vocals (1–4, 6–8, 10)
- Daniel Moore – backing vocals (1, 4, 6–8), lead vocals (8)
- Julia Tillman Waters – backing vocals (4, 7–10)
- Maxine Waters Willard – backing vocals (4, 7–10)
- Niko Bolas – backing vocals (6)
- Martha Davis – backing vocals (7)
- James Ingram – backing vocals (7)

== Production ==
- Kim Carnes – producer
- Bill Cuomo – producer (1–7, 9, 10)
- Duane Hitchings – producer (8)
- Mark Ettel – recording engineer
- Sabrina Bucharek – second engineer
- Tony Chiappa – second engineer
- Judy Clapp – second engineer
- Denny Densmore – second engineer
- David Egerton – second engineer
- Steve MacMillan – second engineer
- Niko Bolas – additional engineer
- Richard Bosworth – additional engineer
- Duane Seykora – additional engineer
- Mike Shipley – mixing (1–5, 8–10)
- Ian Taylor – mixing (6, 7)
- George Marino – mastering at Sterling Sound (New York City, New York)
- Sue McGonigle – project coordinator
- Henry Marquez – art direction
- Jay Vigon – design
- Richard Seireeni – design
- Eric Blum – back cover photography
- Greg Gorman – front cover photography
- Matthew Rolston – inner sleeve photography
- Michael Brokaw – direction

== Charts ==
Chart (1985)	Peak position
Australian Albums (Kent Music Report)	40
Canada Top Albums/CDs (RPM)	59
New Zealand Albums (RMNZ)	24
US Billboard 200	48

== Release history ==
Release formats for Barking At Airplanes
Region	Date	Format(s)	Label
Worldwide	May 5, 1985	Cassette; vinyl	EMI
United States	2001	CD	EMI-Capitol Special Markets
United States	May 23, 2014	CD	Culture Factory
Worldwide	September 1, 2017	Digital download	Capitol Records, LLC
