= It Hurts So Bad =

Single by Kim Carnes

from the album St. Vincent's Court
- B-side: "Lookin' for a Big Night"
- Released: February 17, 1979
- Genre: Country rock
- Label: EMI America
- Songwriter: Kim Carnes
- Producers: Kim Carnes; Dave Ellingson; Daniel Moore

Kim Carnes singles chronology
| "You're a Part of Me" (1978) | "It Hurts So Bad" (1979) | "What Am I Gonna Do" (1979) |

Licensed audio
- "It Hurts So Bad" on YouTube

"'It Hurts So Bad'" is a song written and recorded by American singer-songwriter Kim Carnes, and released as the lead single from her fourth studio album, St. Vincent's Court (1979). Carnes co-produced the album with her husband, Dave Ellingson, and Daniel Moore. It peaked at No. 56 on the Billboard Hot 100 and No. 79 on the Canadian Top Singles chart.

== Background and release ==
Carnes was the first artist signed to the newly formed EMI America label in 1978. Her fourth studio album, St. Vincent's Court, was already mastered when Carnes wrote "It Hurts So Bad". Jim Mazza, the label's president, urged Carnes to record the song and add it to the album. The release of St. Vincent's Court was subsequently pushed back to February 17, 1979.

== Critical reception ==
Billboard magazine described "It Hurts So Bad" as "a welcome inclusion" to her St. Vincent's Court album, stating that Carnes "gives yearning expression to her unfulfilled passion with and air of street-wise resignation."

== Charts ==
| Chart (1979) | Peak position |
|---|---|
| Canada Top Singles (RPM) | 79 |
| US Billboard Hot 100 | 56 |
