= Craig Krampf =

American musician (1945–2026)

- Born: August 25, 1945; Oconomowoc, Wisconsin, U.S.
- Died: April 16, 2026 (aged 80) Nashville, Tennessee, U.S.
- Occupations: Drummer; percussionist; arranger; record producer; songwriter
- Instruments: Drums; percussion
- Years active: 1971–2026
- Formerly of: Cherokee; Skatt Brothers; Silver Condor

Craig Krampf (August 25, 1945 – April 16, 2026) was an American drummer, percussionist, arranger, record producer and songwriter.

The majority of his notable credits are as a studio drummer. Since the 1970s, he played on albums by other artists, including Steve Perry, Alabama, Kim Carnes, Flo & Eddie, Alice Cooper, and Melissa Etheridge. Additionally, Krampf and Perry were founding members of the short-lived rock group Alien Project.

As a songwriter, his biggest hit was with Perry's "Oh Sherrie" (co-written with Perry, Randy Goodrum, and Bill Cuomo), which peaked at #3 on the Billboard Hot 100 chart. Besides "Oh Sherrie," Krampf co-wrote three other songs on Perry's Street Talk album, including "Strung Out", which made it to #40 on the Billboard Hot 100. He also co-wrote a song with Carnes and Duane Hitchings—"I'll Be Here Where the Heart Is"—on the Grammy Award-winning Flashdance (1983) soundtrack.

As a producer, his most notable credit is for producing Ashley Cleveland's "Big Town" (1991, Atlantic Records), Krampf also produced Disappear Fear's self-titled studio album (1994, Rounder Records).

Krampf died in Nashville on April 17, 2026, at the age of 80.

== Partial résumé ==
- Kim Carnes – "Bette Davis Eyes", "Crazy in the Night (Barking at Airplanes)", Romance Dance, Mistaken Identity, Voyeur, Café Racers, Barking at Airplanes, Light House, View from the House
- Alice Cooper – Special Forces, Zipper Catches Skin
- Paul Stanley – Paul Stanley
- Lita Ford – Lita
- Cher – "Skin Deep"
- Richard Simmons – Reach
- Jane Wiedlin – Jane Wiedlin
- Randy Meisner – One More Song
- Timothy B. Schmit – Playin' It Cool
- Joan Armatrading – "Drop the Pilot"
- Steve Perry – Street Talk
- The Motels – "Only the Lonely"
- Melissa Etheridge – "Bring Me Some Water"
- Pam Tillis – Above and Beyond the Doll of Cutey
- Patty Loveless – "You Can Feel Bad"
- Tanya Tucker – "Can't Run from Yourself"
- Nick Gilder – "City Nights"
- Silver Condor (feat. Joe Cerisano) – "Trouble At Home"
