= Light House (album) =

Studio album by Kim Carnes
- Released: May 26, 1986
- Recorded: January 14 – April 15, 1986
- Studio: Record One (Los Angeles, California)
- Genre: Pop rock
- Label: EMI
- Producer: Val Garay

Kim Carnes chronology
Barking at Airplanes (1985)	Light House (1986)	View from the House (1988)

Singles from Light House
- 1. "Divided Hearts" Released: May 1986; 2. "I'd Lie to You for Your Love" Released: July 1986

Professional ratings
Review scores
Source	Rating
The Encyclopedia of Popular Music	3/5 stars

Light House is the tenth studio album by Kim Carnes, released in 1986 through EMI. The album reunited Carnes with Val Garay, who produced her albums Mistaken Identity and Voyeur in the early 80s.

The album spawned one hit single, "Divided Hearts", featuring Phillip Ingram on backing vocals, which peaked at No. 79 on the Billboard Hot 100. The follow-up "I'd Lie to You for Your Love (And That's the Truth)" failed to chart. Light House came to be Carnes' last album with EMI America. It was first issued on CD in Japan in 1987 for a very limited time as Toshiba EMI Ltd. CP32-5150 and now commands a very high price. It has been reissued by label Culture Factory on CD in 2014.

== Critical reception ==
In a review of the lead single, Cashbox described "Divided Hearts" as a "rollicking, bouncing pop tune that disguises the pain of the lyric." Billboard described Light House as Carnes' "most accessible" album since 1981, but opined that there was "no follow-up" to rival "Bette Davis Eyes". In a separate review, Billboard called "I'd Lie to You for Your Love" a "rock stomper with mega-mandolin accompaniment and country-folk harmonies." In a retrospective review of Carnes' career for PopMatters, Christian John Wikane described "Black and White" as "a stunning showcase for Jerry Peterson, whose saxophone solo sparkled like a shooting star sailing through the night sky."

== Promotion ==
"Divided Hearts" entered the Billboard Hot 100 at No. 93 on May 24, 1986. The single spent five consecutive weeks on the chart, peaking at No. 79. "I'd Lie to You for Your Love" was released as the second and final single in July 1986.

In June 1986, Carnes performed "I'd Lie to You for Your Love" and "Black and White" live on The Tonight Show Starring Johnny Carson.

== Track listing ==
No.	Title	Writer(s)	Length
1.	"Divided Hearts"	Kim Carnes; Kathy Kurasch; Donna Weiss; Collin Ellingson	4:09
2.	"I'd Lie to You for Your Love (And That's the Truth)"	Frankie Miller; David Bellamy; Howard Bellamy; Jeff Barry	3:43
3.	"Black and White"	Carnes	5:19
4.	"Piece of the Sky"	Jackie DeShannon; Weiss	3:25
5.	"You Say You Love Me (But I Know You Don't)"	Carnes; Val Garay; Craig Hull	2:48
6.	"Dancin' at the Lighthouse"	Carnes; Daniel Moore	3:52
7.	"Love Me Like You Never Did Before"	Phil Brown; Eric Kaz	4:43
8.	"Along with the Radio"	Carnes; Craig Krampf	4:51
9.	"Only Lonely Love"	Weiss; DeShannon	4:00
10.	"That's Where the Trouble Lies"	Weiss; Bruce Roberts	3:30
Total length:			40:20

== Personnel ==
- Kim Carnes – lead vocals, harmony vocals (9, 10), backing vocals (10)
- Steve Goldstein – keyboards, keyboard bass, Linn 9000 drum programming
- Kathy Kurasch – synthesizers (1)
- Randy Edelman – synthesizers (4, 8)
- Eric Kaz – synthesizers (7)
- Lauren Wood – synthesizers (9), backing vocals (9)
- Craig Hull – guitars (1–6, 8–10)
- Waddy Watchel – guitars (1–6, 8–10), harmony vocals (1)
- Clive Wright – guitar solo (1, 8, 10)
- Phil Brown – guitars (7), backing vocals (7)
- Erik Scott – bass (1, 2, 4–10)
- Bob Glaub – bass (3)
- Craig Krampf – drums, percussion
- Jerry Peterson – saxophones
- Kevin Dorsey – backing vocals (1, 5)
- Phillip Ingram – backing vocals (1, 5)
- Oren Waters – backing vocals (1, 5)
- Dave Ellingson – backing vocals (2, 10)
- Daniel Moore – backing vocals (2), harmony vocals (6)
- The Steeles – backing vocals (6)
- Donna Weiss – harmony vocals (9), backing vocals (10)

== Production ==
- Val Garay – producer, recording, mixing
- Richard Bosworth – recording
- Sue McGonigle – project coordinator
- John Kosh – art direction, design
- Ron Larson – art direction, design
- Henry Marquez – art direction
- Henry Diltz – photography

== Charts ==
Chart (1986)	Peak position
US Billboard 200	116
