= You're a Part of Me =

Single by Kim Carnes

from the album Kim Carnes
- B-side: "Hang on to Your Airplane (Honeymoon)"
- Released: 1975
- Label: A&M
- Songwriter: Kim Carnes

"You're a Part of Me" is a song by the American singer-songwriter Kim Carnes. It was produced by Mentor Williams and features on her self-titled album, released in 1975. It became Carnes’ first chart hit as a solo artist, reaching number 25 on the Canadian Adult Contemporary chart. In 1978, Carnes re-recorded the song as a duet with Gene Cotton. Their version reached number 36 on the Billboard Hot 100.

"You're a Part of Me" was first released by Susan Jacks, whose version reached number 41 on the Canadian Singles Chart, number 11 on the AC chart, and number 90 on the Billboard Hot 100.

== Critical reception ==
Billboard likened "You're a Part of Me" to the music of Olivia Newton-John, describing it as a "pretty ballad".

== Commercial performance ==
"You're a Part of Me" entered the Canadian AC chart on January 31, 1976. It spent a total of six weeks in the Top 50, peaking at number 25.

== Charts ==
=== Susan Jacks ===
Chart (1975)	Peak position
Canada Top Singles (RPM)	41
Canada Adult Contemporary (RPM)	11
US Billboard Hot 100	90

=== Kim Carnes ===
Chart (1976)	Peak position
Canada Adult Contemporary (RPM)	25

=== Gene Cotton and Kim Carnes ===
Chart (1978)	Peak position
Canada Adult Contemporary (RPM)	1
Canada Top Singles (RPM)	32
US Billboard Hot 100	36
US Billboard Adult Contemporary	6

=== Charly McClain ===
Chart (1979)	Peak position
Canada Country Singles (RPM)	66
