= Romance Dance =

Studio album by Kim Carnes
- Released: June 2, 1980
- Studios: Studio Sound (North Hollywood, California)
- Genre: Pop
- Length: 34:00
- Label: EMI America
- Producers: Daniel Moore; Mike Piccirillo; George Tobin

Kim Carnes chronology
St. Vincent's Court (1979)	Romance Dance (1980)	Mistaken Identity (1981)

Singles from Romance Dance
- 1. "More Love" Released: May 1980; 2. "Cry Like a Baby" Released: 1980

Romance Dance is the fifth studio album by American singer-songwriter Kim Carnes. It was released on June 2, 1980, by EMI America. It became Carnes' first charting album, peaking at no. 57 on the Billboard 200. Nine tracks were produced by George Tobin in association with Mike Piccirillo, and one track was produced by Daniel Moore, who worked with Carnes on her previous album, St. Vincent's Court.

The album features hit singles "More Love" and "Cry Like a Baby", which reached Nos. 10 and 44, respectively, on the Billboard Hot 100.

== Background ==
The album was produced by George Tobin in association with Mike Piccirillo. Carnes had originally intended to record "Bette Davis Eyes" for Romance Dance. Ahead of the album's release, Carnes stated that Romance Dance would be more upbeat than her previous albums, with less of a country influence.

== Release and promotion ==
Romance Dance was released on June 2, 1980, by EMI America. Promotion began with Carnes embarking on a tour of American radio stations before joining James Taylor as the support act for a North American concert tour in August 1980. In a review of their concert at the Nashville Municipal Auditorium, Billboard noted Carnes' "mesmirizing sandpaper vocals" and described her as an "unforgettable performer".

Carnes appeared on episode 24 of the fourth season of Sha Na Na to perform "More Love".

== Critical reception ==
Professional ratings
Review scores
Source	Rating
AllMusic	3/5 stars
The Encyclopedia of Popular Music	3/5 stars
The Rolling Stone Album Guide	2.5/5 stars

Writing for The StarPhoenix, Don Perkins commended the album and compared Carnes' vocals to Maggie Bell and Melissa Manchester. In the Los Angeles Times, Robert Hilburn described Romance Dance as "one of the best mainstream pop albums" since Carole Bayer Sager's 1977 self-titled debut album.

== Track listing ==
1. "Swept Me Off My Feet (The Part of the Fool)" (Kim Carnes) – 3:21
2. "Cry Like a Baby" (Dan Penn, Spooner Oldham) – 3:05
3. "Will You Remember Me" (Carnes) – 4:42
4. "Tear Me Apart" (Nicky Chinn, Mike Chapman) – 3:31 (Originally performed by Suzi Quatro in 1976.)
5. "Changin'" (Carnes, Dave Ellingson) – 3:54
6. "More Love" (William Robinson) – 3:38
7. "In the Chill of the Night" (Carnes, Ellingson) – 4:22
8. "Where Is Your Heart" (Carnes, Ellingson) – 3:45
9. "And Still Be Loving You" (Carnes, Ellingson) – 3:42

== Personnel ==
- Kim Carnes – lead vocals, backing vocals (1–3, 7, 8), acoustic piano (5)
- Bill Cuomo – keyboards (1–3, 6–9), organ (1, 7), ARP String Ensemble (6, 9), string arrangements (9)
- Mike Thompson – keyboards (4)
- Mike Piccirillo – guitars (1, 2, 4, 6), mandolin (1), arrangements (2, 4, 6), backing vocals (2, 4, 8), electric guitar (3, 7), percussion (4), acoustic guitar (7)
- Steve Geyer – acoustic guitar (3), electric guitar (7)
- John Beland – mandolin (5), dobro (5)
- Eric Nelson – bass (1, 3, 4, 7)
- Scott Edwards – bass (2, 6, 8, 9)
- David Hungate – bass (5)
- Craig Krampf – drums (1–3, 6–9)
- Joel Peskin – saxophone
- Raphael Ravenscroft – saxophone (6)
- Jim Ed Norman – string arrangements (5)
- Julia Waters Tillman – backing vocals (1, 3, 7)
- Maxine Waters Willard – backing vocals (1, 3, 7)
- Patrick Bolen – backing vocals (2, 4)
- Dave Ellingson – backing vocals (2, 8)
- Herb Pedersen – backing vocals (5)
- Kin Vassy – backing vocals (5)
- Darlene Love – backing vocals (6)
- Edna Wright – backing vocals (6)

Production

- Mike Piccirillo – producer (1–4, 6–9), engineer (1–4, 6–9)
- George Tobin – producer (1–4, 6–9)
- Daniel Moore – producer (5)
- Ryan Ulyate – engineer (1–4, 6–9)
- Howard Wolen – engineer (1–4, 6–9)
- Mark Wolfson – engineer (1–4, 6–9)
- Larry Hirsch – engineer (5)
- Ron Evans – second engineer (1–4, 6–9)
- Val Garay – mixing at Record One (Los Angeles, California)
- Niko Bolas – mix assistant
- Mike Reese – mastering
- Doug Sax – mastering
- The Mastering Lab (Hollywood, California) – mastering location
- Gary Goetzman – production manager for George Tobin Productions
- Lisa Marie – session coordinator
- Bill Burks – art direction, design
- Norman Seeff – photography
- Stan Evenson – lettering

== Charts ==
Chart (1980)	Peak position
Australian Albums (Kent Music Report)	89
Canada Top Albums/CDs (RPM)	77
US Billboard 200	57
