= Checkin' Out the Ghosts =

Studio album by Kim Carnes
- Released: March 21, 1991
- Recorded: 1991
- Studio: Studio Ultimo and Studio 55 (Los Angeles, California); Capitol Studios (Hollywood, California); Westlake Recording Studios (West Hollywood, California)
- Genre: Rock; Pop
- Length: 39:34
- Label: Zebrazone
- Producer: Joey Carbone; Kim Carnes

Kim Carnes chronology
View from the House (1988)	Checkin' Out the Ghosts (1991)	Gypsy Honeymoon: The Best of Kim Carnes (1993)

Singles from Checkin' Out the Ghosts
- 1. "Independent Girl" Released: 1991

Professional ratings
Review scores
Source	Rating
The Encyclopedia of Popular Music	3/5 stars

Checkin' Out the Ghosts (愛のゴースト, Ghost of Love) is the twelfth studio album by American singer Kim Carnes, released exclusively in Japan on March 21, 1991, via Zebrazone. Carnes co-produced the album with Joey Carbone.

Two years after the album was released, Carnes re-recorded the track "Gypsy Honeymoon" for her 1993 compilation album, Gypsy Honeymoon: The Best of Kim Carnes. Checkin' Out the Ghosts includes a re-recording of "Hangin' On by a Thread (A Sad Affair of the Heart)", which first appeared on Carnes' album Café Racers (1983). "Independent Girl" was released as the album's only single in 1991.

== Track listing ==
No.	Title	Writer(s)	Length
1.	"Tears Edge"	Kim Carnes; Donna Weiss	4:38
2.	"River of Memories"	Carnes; Collin Ellingson; Weiss	5:04
3.	"Gypsy Honeymoon"	Carnes; Ellingson	4:14
4.	"Hangin' on by a Thread"	Carnes	3:09
5.	"Look Through Children's Eyes"	Carnes; Weiss	4:30
6.	"Nothin' Better Than Love"	Carnes; Dennis Belfield; Weiss	4:01
7.	"Independent Girl"	Michelle Hart; Joey Carbone; Belfield	4:01
8.	"Checkin' Out the Ghosts"	Carnes	3:39
9.	"You Are Everything"	Thom Bell; Linda Creed	3:28
10.	"Get Busy"	Carnes; Carbone; Belfield	3:27

== Production ==
- Fumihiro Ishikawa – executive producer
- Joey Carbone – producer, arrangements
- Kim Carnes – producer (1–6, 8–10), arrangements (1–6, 8–10)
- Leslie Ann Jones – recording, mixing
- Bill Smith – recording, mixing
- Mitch Zelezny – recording
- Matt Hyde – mixing
- Tom Biener – assistant engineer
- Ray Blair – assistant engineer
- Scott Blockland – assistant engineer
- Chris Fuhrman – assistant engineer
- Mark Hagen – assistant engineer
- Stephen Marcussen – mastering at Precision Mastering (Hollywood, California)
- Michelle Hart – production coordinator
- Norman Moore – design
- Henry Diltz – photography

== Personnel ==
- Kim Carnes – lead vocals, backing vocals (2, 3, 5, 6, 9)
- Steve Goldstein – keyboards (1–6, 10), synthesizers (8, 9)
- Collin Ellingson – programming (2), keyboard programming (3), guitar programming (3)
- Mike Tavera – keyboards (7), programming (7)
- Michael Thompson – guitars (1–6, 9, 10)
- Troy Dexter – guitars (7)
- Dennis Belfield – bass (1–6, 8–10)
- Carlos Vega – drums (1–6, 9, 10)
- Joey Carbone – tambourine (1–5), backing vocals (1, 10), keyboards (7)
- Roger Lebow – cello (4)
- Steve Madaio – trumpet (8)
- Dave Ellingson – backing vocals (1)
- Lynne Fiddmont-Linsey – backing vocals (1)
- Tampa Lann – backing vocals (1)
- Andrea Robinson – backing vocals (1)
- David Lasley – backing vocals (2, 9)
- Arnold McCuller – backing vocals (2, 9)
- Julie Waters – backing vocals (3, 6, 7)
- Maxine Waters – backing vocals (3, 6, 7)
- Joseph Williams – backing vocals (4, 6, 10)
- Donna Weiss – backing vocals (5)
- Crossroads Chamber Chorus – backing vocals (5)
- Carole Keiser – chorus director (5)
- Bill Champlin – backing vocals (6, 10)
- George Hawkins – backing vocals (6, 10)
- Myrna Matthews – backing vocals (7)
