= You Make My Heart Beat Faster (And That's All That Matters) =

Single by Kim Carnes

from the album Café Racers
- Released: 1984
- Recorded: 1983
- Genre: Rock
- Length: 4:35
- Label: EMI America
- Songwriters: Kim Carnes; Dave Ellingson; Martin Page; Brian Fairweather
- Producer: Keith Olsen

Licensed audio
- "You Make My Heart Beat Faster (And That's All That Matters)" on YouTube

"You Make My Heart Beat Faster (And That's All That Matters)" is a song by American singer-songwriter Kim Carnes and the second single from her eighth studio album, Café Racers (1983). Carnes co-wrote the track with her husband, David Ellingson, and Q-Feel bandmates Martin Page and Brian Fairweather. The track was produced by Keith Olsen.

The single peaked at no. 54 on the Billboard Hot 100 in March 1984, and no. 15 on the Billboard Dance Club Songs chart.

A music video was shot at the historic Riverside Raceway in Riverside, California. It features local driver Steve Webb driving his classic #45 royal blue Formula Ford. The video also features British actor Ian McShane.

== Format and track listings ==
The single was released twice.

7" vinyl released in the United States.

No.	Title	Writer(s)	Length
1.	"You Make My Heart Beat Faster (And That's All That Matters)"	Kim Carnes, Dave Ellingson, Martin Page, Brian Fairweather	4:35
2.	"Hangin' On by a Thread (A Sad Affair of the Heart)"	Kim Carnes	2:51

7" vinyl released in Germany.

No.	Title	Writer(s)	Length
1.	"You Make My Heart Beat Faster (And That's All That Matters)"	Kim Carnes, Dave Ellingson, Martin Page, Brian Fairweather	4:35
2.	"I Pretend"	Martin Page, Brian Fairweather	5:20

== Charts ==
Chart (1984)	Peak position
US Billboard Dance Club Songs	15
US Billboard Hot 100	54
US Cash Box Top 100	63
