= Draw of the Cards =

Single by Kim Carnes

from the album Mistaken Identity
- B-side: "Break the Rules Tonite (Out of School)"
- Released: August 1981
- Recorded: January 1981
- Genre: Rock; synth-pop
- Length: 4:53 (Album Version); 4:02 (Single Version)
- Label: EMI America
- Songwriters: Kim Carnes; Bill Cuomo; Dave Ellingson; Val Garay
- Producer: Val Garay

Kim Carnes singles chronology
"Bette Davis Eyes" (1981)	"Draw of the Cards" (1981)	"Mistaken Identity" (1981)

Music video
- "Draw of the Cards" on YouTube

"Draw of the Cards" is a 1981 song, released as the second single by American singer and songwriter Kim Carnes for her sixth studio album, Mistaken Identity.

== Background ==
Carnes said that the idea for the song came from when she went with her husband and co-writer Dave Ellingson and her producer Val Garay to visit her guitarist in the hospital. Carnes said that she said "something about his illness being all in the draw of the cards." Carnes continued that "We wrote some lines that went with that theme, then later Bill [Cuomo] brought his Prophet synthesizer over, played a line he had, and we pulled out the lyrics to finish the song."

== Reception ==
The single reached #28 on the Billboard Hot 100 in September 1981, failing to match the chart success of its predecessor, "Bette Davis Eyes", which reached #1. Billboard called it an "adventurous track" in which Carnes' "cool, distant vocal delivery maintains its intriguing edge" and said that the song has a "dazzling arrangement." Record World said that "Serpentine keyboards lurk among grating guitars and Kim's raspy purrs" and felt this was a strong follow up to Carnes' previous single.

Tampa Bay Times contributor Kevin Wuench felt that the song has a "great '80s synth sound." Rolling Stone critic Dave Marsh called it a "standout". Music critic Colin Larkin described the song as having a "contagious, swirling organ-dominated sound." Viacom ranked "Draw of the Cards" as Carnes' 10th best song, stating that it was "just as intoxicating in its creepiness" as Carnes' previous single, "Bette Davis Eyes."

Some critics had negative reactions to the song. Boston Globe critic Bill Flanagan called it a "silly attempt at pulsating rhythmic sensuality...that sounds desperately self-conscious." Leader-Post critic Bruce Johnstone called it "a blustery and bombastic piece of pseudo-rock" and said that "despite its catchy beat and some nice saxophone and guitar filler, nothing can disguise the song's inherent emptiness." Chicago Tribune critic Blair R. Fischer called it "inimitably forgettable."

== Music video ==
The music video was directed by Russell Mulcahy, who had also directed the video for "Bette Davis Eyes." According to Wuench, the video "has some weird carnival activities and one long tongue by some creature of the underworld."

== Format and track listings ==
7" Single

- A "Draw of the Cards" (3:58)
- B "Break the Rules Tonite (Out of School)" (3:15)

12" Single

- A "Draw of the Cards" (Special Long Version) (6:53)
- B "Break the Rules Tonite (Out of School)" (3:15)

== Charts ==
Chart (1981)	Peak position
Australia (Kent Music Report)	64
Austria (Ö3 Austria Top 40)	16
Canada Top Singles (RPM)	42
Ireland (IRMA)	30
Luxembourg (Radio Luxembourg)	24
New Zealand (Recorded Music NZ)	12
Switzerland (Schweizer Hitparade)	13
UK Singles (Official Charts)	49
US Billboard Hot 100	28
US Cash Box Top 100	25
West Germany (GfK)	35
Quebec (ADISQ)	17
