= EMI-Capitol Special Markets =

EMI-Capitol Special Markets was an EMI subsidiary handling distribution for special markets.

== History ==
It bought 3C Records in the early 1990s.

It later operated as EMI Music Marketing and EMI Music Distribution in North America. It was later absorbed into Universal Music Enterprises after Universal Music Group acquired EMI recorded music division (including most of North American assets) while UMG divested selected EMI assets (such as Parlophone and Roulette Records) to Warner Music Group. Those assets are managed in North America by Rhino Entertainment.

== See also ==
- Lists of record labels
