= Café Racers =

Studio album by Kim Carnes
- Released: October 1983
- Recorded: 1983
- Studios: Goodnight LA Studios (Van Nuys, California)
- Genre: Pop rock
- Length: 43:10
- Label: EMI
- Producer: Keith Olsen

Kim Carnes chronology
Voyeur (1982)	Café Racers (1983)	Barking at Airplanes (1985)

Singles from Café Racers
- 1. "Invisible Hands" Released: October 1983; 2. "You Make My Heart Beat Faster (And That's All That Matters)" Released: January 1984; 3. "The Universal Song" Released: January 1984; 4. "I Pretend" Released: May 1984

Professional ratings
Review scores
Source	Rating
AllMusic	2/5 stars
The Encyclopedia of Popular Music	2/5 stars

Café Racers is the eighth studio album by American singer Kim Carnes, released in October 1983 by EMI America Records.

The album spawned three chart singles in the United States, "Invisible Hands", "You Make My Heart Beat Faster (And That's All That Matters)", and "I Pretend" which charted on various Billboard charts. "The Universal Song" was also released as a single in West Germany, Austria, Switzerland, the Netherlands and Scandinavia.

The song "I'll Be Here Where the Heart Is" was included on the chart-topping, six times Platinum Flashdance soundtrack which received a Grammy Award for Best Album Of Original Score Written for a Motion Picture at 26th Annual Grammy Awards. It was also released as a single in Germany, Netherlands, Spain and France.

The album was not as successful as Mistaken Identity (1981) or Voyeur (1982), peaking at No. 97 on the Billboard 200 chart.

== Background ==
Following Mistaken Identity (1981) and Voyeur (1982), Carnes intended to continue working with producer Val Garay for her third album with EMI. Garay was occupied producing Little Robbers for The Motels, so Carnes approached Keith Olsen, who had recently produced her hit "I'll Be Here Where the Heart Is" for the Flashdance soundtrack.

== Release and promotion ==
Café Racers was released in October 1983.

"Invisible Hands" was released as the album's lead single in October 1983. It spent a total of twelve weeks on the Billboard Hot 100 chart, peaking at no. 40 for two consecutive weeks. It peaked slightly higher on the Cash Box Top 100 chart at no. 34. In Canada, "Invisible Hands" peaked at no. 44. "You Make My Heart Beat Faster (And That's All That Matters)" followed as the album's second single in January 1984. It peaked at no. 54 on the Billboard Hot 100, and no. 15 on the Billboard Dance Club Songs chart. "I Pretend" was released as the album's third single in May 1984. It peaked at no. 74 on the Billboard Hot 100, and no. 10 on the Billboard Adult Contemporary chart. "The Universal Song" was released exclusively in the Netherlands, where it peaked at no. 29 on the Dutch Top 40 and no. 40 on the Dutch Single Top 100 in 1984. "Young Love" was released exclusively in Canada, and a remix of "Hurricane" by Rusty Garner was released in the United States.

== Critical reception ==
Billboard opined that Café Racers was "superior" to Carnes' previous album Voyeur, and that it "captures both sides of Carnes' music – the trendy and the timeless".

In a retrospective review for AllMusic, Stephen Thomas Erlewine described Café Racers as "a snapshot of the various styles and sounds of mainstream radio circa 1983". He proposed that the album's commercial failure was due to a lack of hit record material, and suggested that the abundance of single remixes that were sent to radio stations added "an air of desperation" to Café Racers.

== Track listing ==
Side one
No.	Title	Writer(s)	Length
1.	"You Make My Heart Beat Faster (And That's All That Matters)"	Kim Carnes; Dave Ellingson; Martin Page; Brian Fairweather	4:35
2.	"Young Love"	Gary O'Connor	4:14
3.	"Met You at the Wrong Time of My Life"	Paul Wilson; B.P. Hurding	5:21
4.	"Hurricane"	Carnes; Bill Cuomo	4:30
5.	"The Universal Song"	Cuomo; Carnes; Ellingson	3:52
6.	"Invisible Hands"	Page; Fairweather	3:12
7.	"I Pretend"	Page; Fairweather	5:20
8.	"Hangin' On by a Thread (A Sad Affair of the Heart)"	Carnes	2:51
9.	"A Kick in the Heart"	Mark Goldenberg	4:32
10.	"I'll Be Here Where the Heart Is"	Carnes; Craig Krampf; Duane Hitchings	4:43

2001 re-issue
No.	Title	Writer(s)	Length
11.	"You Make My Heart Beat Faster (And That's All That Matters)" (Extended version)	Carnes; Ellingson; Page; Fairweather	6:07
12.	"Hurricane" (Extended vocal version)	Carnes; Cuomo	5:13
13.	"Invitation to Dance" (Vocal Dance Mix)	Carnes; Ellingson; Page; Fairweather	6:30

== Charts ==
Chart (1983)	Peak position
US Billboard 200	97

== Personnel ==
- Kim Carnes – lead vocals, backing vocals (3, 6, 7, 9, 10)
- Bill Cuomo – keyboards (1, 2, 4, 5, 7–10), synthesizers (3), keyboard solo (6)
- Steve Porcaro – keyboards (2)
- David Paich – acoustic piano (3), keyboard bass (6)
- Duane Hitchings – keyboards (10)
- Chas Sandford – guitars (1, 4, 5), backing vocals (1, 4, 5)
- Steve Lukather – guitar solo (1), guitars (2, 3, 6, 7, 9)
- Waddy Wachtel – guitars (2, 3, 10), backing vocals (2)
- Mark Andes – bass (2, 3, 6, 7, 9)
- Denny Carmassi – drums (1–7, 9, 10)
- Craig Krampf – drums (8)
- Keith Olsen – percussion (3)
- Jerry Peterson – saxophone (3, 4, 7)
- Brian Fairweather – backing vocals (5–7), Simmons drums (6)
- Martin Page – backing vocals (5–7), Roland Jupiter 8 (6)
- Kevin Chalfant – backing vocals (7)
- John Waite – backing vocals (8)
- Daniel Moore – backing vocals (10)
- Dave Ellingson – backing vocals (10)

== Production ==
- Keith Olsen – producer, engineer
- Dennis Sager – engineer
- Greg Fulginiti – mastering at Artisan Sound Recorders (Hollywood, California)
- Susan McGonigle – production coordinator
- John Kosh – art direction, design
- Ron Larson – art direction, design
- Robert Blakeman – cover photography
- Jackie Sallow – sleeve photography
- Michael Brokaw (Kragen & Co.) – direction
