= Kim Carnes (album) =

Studio album by Kim Carnes
- Released: November 1975
- Recorded: 1975
- Studio: A&M (Hollywood)
- Genre: Country
- Length: 38:10
- Label: A&M
- Producer: Mentor Williams

Kim Carnes chronology
Rest on Me (1971)	Kim Carnes (1975)	Sailin' (1976)

Singles from Kim Carnes
- 1. "Bad Seed" Released: 1975; 2. "You're a Part of Me" Released: November 1975; 3. "Somewhere in the Night" Released: 1975

Kim Carnes is the second studio album by Kim Carnes, released in 1975 (see 1975 in music).

The album gave Carnes her first hit, with "You're a Part of Me" (solo version) peaking in 1976 at No. 32 on the Billboard Adult Contemporary charts. Although this album hasn't been released on CD, eight of the album's eleven songs can be found on the European CD "Master Series".

== Background ==
After releasing her debut album Rest on Me through Amos Records in 1971, Carnes signed to A&M Records in early 1975. She described Kim Carnes as a "much more even" record than her debut, owing to her increased experience with writing and recording demos. "You're a Part of Me" was released as the lead single, having originally been recorded by Susan Jacks in 1974. Carnes' version reached number 32 on the Billboard Adult Contemporary chart in February 1976. Two years later, a re-recording of the song in duet with Gene Cotton reached number 36 on the Billboard Hot 100 chart, and number 6 on the Adult Contemporary chart.

== Critical reception ==
Professional ratings
Review scores
Source	Rating
AllMusic	3/5 stars
The Encyclopedia of Popular Music	3/5 stars

In a positive review, Cash Box commended the "soul" in Carnes' voice, stating that "an aura of feel and sensitivity between singer and song predominates throughout". In a review of the single, Billboard likened "You're a Part of Me" to the music of Olivia Newton-John, describing it as a "pretty ballad".

== Track listing ==
Side one
No.	Title	Writer(s)	Length
1.	"You're a Part of Me"	Kim Carnes	3:32
2.	"Bad Seed"	Carnes; Dave Ellingson; Mentor Williams; Eddie Reeves	4:30
3.	"And Still Be Loving You"	Carnes; Ellingson	4:45
4.	"Hang On to Your Airplane (Honeymoon)"	Carnes; Ellingson	3:00
5.	"Do You Love Her"	Carnes	3:48

Side two
No.	Title	Writer(s)	Length
6.	"Somewhere in the Night"	Will Jennings; Richard Kerr	3:40
7.	"Nothing Makes Me Feel as Good as a Love Song"	Carnes	2:55
8.	"It Could Have Been Better"	Carnes; Ellingson	2:28
9.	"Waiting for the Pain to Go Away"	Stephen H. Dorff; Milton L. Brown	3:10
10.	"What Good Is Love (Later on the Equator)"	Carnes; Ellingson	3:22
11.	"Good Old Days"	Carnes; Ellingson	3:00
Total length:			38:10

== Personnel ==
Adapted from the album liner notes.

- Kim Carnes – lead vocals, backing vocals, Fender Rhodes (track 11)
- Mentor Williams – production, backing vocals
- Jim Keltner – drums
- Leland Sklar – bass
- Dean Parks – guitars
- David Foster – piano, clavinet, Fender Rhodes
- Steve Forman – percussion
- Michael Utley – organ, Moog synthesizer
- Maxine Willard – backing vocals
- Julia Tillman – backing vocals
- Dave Ellingson – backing vocals
- David Briggs – string arrangements (tracks 1–8, 10–11)
- Steve Dorff – string arrangementsstring arrangements (track 9)

=== Technical ===
- Rick Porter – engineer
- Chuck Trammel – second engineer
- Bernie Grundman – mastering

=== Design ===
- Roland Young – art direction, photography
- Chuck Beeson – album design
