= Sailin' =

Studio album by Kim Carnes
- Released: 1976
- Recorded: 1976
- Studios: Muscle Shoals, Sheffield, Alabama
- Length: 36:07
- Label: A&M
- Producers: Jerry Wexler; Barry Beckett

Kim Carnes chronology
Kim Carnes (1975)	Sailin' (1976)	St. Vincent's Court (1979)

Singles from Sailin'
- 1. "Love Comes from Unexpected Places" Released: 1976; 2. "It's Not the Spotlight" Released: 1976; 3. "Let Your Love Come Easy" Released: March 1977; 4. "Sailin'" Released: July 1977

Professional ratings
Review scores
Source	Rating
The Encyclopedia of Popular Music	3/5 stars

Sailin' is the third studio album by Kim Carnes, released in 1976. The record was recorded, in part, in Muscle Shoals, Alabama with the famed Muscle Shoals Rhythm Section. Although this album hasn't been released on CD, all of the album's songs can be found on the European CD "Kim Carnes - Master Series" released by A&M in 1999.

== Background ==
Sailin' was recorded at the Muscle Shoals Sound Studio in Sheffield, Alabama, with producers Jerry Wexler and Barry Beckett. Carnes and Ellingson received the Professional Grand Prize at the American Song Festival and Best Composition at the Tokyo Song Festival for "Love Comes from the Most Unexpected Places" in 1976. Barbra Streisand later covered the song on her album Superman, released in the following year. Streisand had offered the song to film director Richard Brooks for the opening credits of Looking for Mr. Goodbar, but he declined.

== Critical reception ==
Billboard described Sailin' as "an outstanding effort" from Carnes, showing "strength with lyrics and melodies" a voice that "reflects white gospel roots". Cashbox described "Let Your Love Come Easy" as having "good chorus hooks and snappy instrumentation".

== Track listing ==
All tracks written by Kim Carnes and Dave Ellingson, except where noted.

Side one
No.	Title	Writer(s)	Length
1.	"The Best of You (Has Got the Best of Me)"	Carnes; Eddie Reeves	3:04
2.	"Warm Love"	Van Morrison	3:17
3.	"All He Did Was Tell Me Lies (To Try to Woo Me)"	Carnes	3:50
4.	"He'll Come Home"	Carnes	3:00
5.	"Sailin'"		4:15

Side two
No.	Title	Writer(s)	Length
6.	"It's Not the Spotlight"	Barry Goldberg; Gerry Goffin	4:00
7.	"Last Thing You Ever Wanted to Do"		3:49
8.	"Let Your Love Come Easy"		3:30
9.	"Tubin'"		4:01
10.	"Love Comes from Unexpected Places"		3:31
Total length:			36:07

== Personnel ==
Adapted from the album liner notes.

- Kim Carnes – all vocals; writer (tracks: 1, 3–5, 7–10); acoustic piano (tracks: 4, 9); backing vocals
- Jerry Wexler – producer
- Barry Beckett – producer, keyboards; horn arrangements (track 2)
- Jack Adams – engineer
- Steve Gursky – assistant engineer
- Jim Skiathigis – set-up man
- David Hood – bass guitar
- Roger Hawkins – drums, percussion
- Pete Carr – lead guitar, acoustic guitars, dobro
- Jimmy Johnson – acoustic guitars, rhythm electric guitar
- Tom Roady – percussion
- David Grisman – mandolin (tracks: 3, 5); backing vocals (track 3)
- Julia Tillman – backing vocals
- Maxine Willard – backing vocals
- Dave Ellingson – writer (tracks: 5, 7, 9, 10); backing vocals (track 3)
- Blackie Shackner – harmonica (track 9)
- Harrison Calloway – horns (track 2); horn arrangements (track 2)
- Harvey Thompson – horns (track 2)
- Charles Rose – horns (track 2)
- Ron Eades – horns (track 2)
- Bill Cuomo – acoustic piano (track 10); string arrangements (track 10)
- Bob Wilber – horn arrangements, soprano saxophone (track 9)
- Mike Lewis – string arrangements (tracks: 1, 4, 7, 10)
- Robert Basso – concertmaster
- Chris Colclesser – flute solo (track 8)

Technical

- Roland Young – art direction
- Chuck Beeson – album design
- Lisa Powers – photography (front cover)
- Jim Mayfield – photography (back cover)

== Release history ==
Release formats for Sailin'
Region	Date	Format(s)	Label
Various	1976	Vinyl	A&M
Canada	1981	Vinyl	A&M
Brazil	1996	CD	A&M
Various	October 29, 2021	Digital download; streaming	UMG Recordings, Inc.
