= Mistaken Identity (Kim Carnes album) =

1981 studio album by Kim Carnes

Studio album by Kim Carnes
- Released: April 1981
- Recorded: December 15, 1980 – January 12, 1981
- Studio: Record One (Los Angeles)
- Genres: Pop rock; soft rock
- Length: 40:13
- Label: EMI America
- Producer: Val Garay

Kim Carnes chronology
Romance Dance (1980)	Mistaken Identity (1981)	Voyeur (1982)

Alternative cover
- International cover

Singles from Mistaken Identity
- 1. "Bette Davis Eyes" Released: March 9, 1981; 2. "Draw of the Cards" Released: August 1981; 3. "Mistaken Identity" Released: 1981

Professional ratings
Review scores
Source	Rating
AllMusic	4.5/5 stars
The Encyclopedia of Popular Music	4/5 stars

Mistaken Identity is the sixth studio album by American singer Kim Carnes, released in April 1981 by EMI America Records. The album spent four weeks at number one on the Billboard 200, and was subsequently certified platinum by the Recording Industry Association of America (RIAA). It was nominated for the Grammy Award for Album of the Year.

The album's lead single "Bette Davis Eyes" peaked at number one on the Billboard Hot 100 for nine non-consecutive weeks and topped the Hot 100 year-end chart of 1981. It won the 1982 Grammy Awards for Song of the Year and Record of the Year. Follow-up singles "Draw of the Cards" and "Mistaken Identity" reached numbers 28 and 60 on the Billboard Hot 100, respectively.

Record World said of the title track that "Dreamy sax/keyboard colors provide the backdrop for [Carnes'] vocal longing."

== Release and promotion ==
The album's supporting tour, titled the Mistaken Identity Summer Tour '81, ran from August to October 1981, split into two legs. The first leg began in Dallas, Texas, on August 16. It was Carnes' first time headlining a tour. Gary U.S. Bonds was the support act.

== Commercial performance ==
Mistaken Identity became Carnes' best-selling album, and her first to chart within the US Top 40. It entered the Billboard 200 at no. 66 in the week of May 2, 1981, and climbed to No. 1 in its ninth week. It spent a total of four weeks at the top of the chart, selling 1 million copies and earning Platinum certification. The album's success was buoyed by its lead single "Bette Davis Eyes", which spent nine non-consecutive weeks at No. 1 on the Billboard Hot 100 between May and July 1981. Subsequent singles "Draw of the Cards" and "Mistaken Identity" peaked at No. 28 and No. 60, respectively.

== Track listing ==
Side one
No.	Title	Writer(s)	Length
1.	"Bette Davis Eyes"	Donna Weiss; Jackie DeShannon	3:47
2.	"Hit and Run"	Weiss; DeShannon	3:17
3.	"Mistaken Identity"	Kim Carnes	4:49
4.	"When I'm Away from You"	Frankie Miller	3:36
5.	"Draw of the Cards"	Carnes; Dave Ellingson; Bill Cuomo; Val Garay	4:54

Side two
No.	Title	Writer(s)	Length
6.	"Break the Rules Tonite (Out of School)"	Carnes; Ellingson; Wendy Waldman	3:17
7.	"Still Hold On"	Carnes; Ellingson; Eric Kaz; Waldman	4:39
8.	"Don't Call It Love"	Tom Snow; Dean Pitchford	3:09
9.	"Miss You Tonite"	Carnes	5:12
10.	"My Old Pals"	Richard Stekol	3:19

1999 remastered reissue bonus tracks (The Mistaken Identity Collection)
No.	Title	Writer(s)	Length
11.	"More Love"	William Robinson Jr.	3:35
12.	"Invisible Hands" (Dance Mix)	Martin Page; Brian Fairweather	5:08
13.	"Voyeur"	Carnes; Ellingson; Duane Hitchings	3:56
14.	"Crazy in the Night (Barking at Airplanes)"	Carnes	3:36
15.	"I Pretend"	Page; Fairweather	5:20
16.	"Don't Fall in Love with a Dreamer" (with Kenny Rogers)	Carnes; Ellingson	3:39

== Personnel ==
Credits adapted from the liner notes of Mistaken Identity.

=== Musicians ===
- Kim Carnes – lead vocals (all tracks); piano (track 10)
- Bill Cuomo – arrangements (tracks 1, 3); Prophet
- Steve Goldstein – keyboards
- Bryan Garofalo – bass, background vocals
- Craig Krampf – drums, background vocals
- Craig Hull – electric guitar, slide guitar, background vocals
- Josh Leo – electric guitar, acoustic guitar, mandolin, background vocals
- M. L. Benoit – percussion
- Jerry Peterson – saxophone
- Waddy Wachtel – electric guitar (track 1); acoustic guitar (track 2); harmony vocals (track 6); background vocals
- Danny Kortchmar – acoustic guitar (tracks 4, 7)
- Don Francisco – percussion (tracks 6, 9)
- Dave Ellingson – harmony vocals (tracks 2, 3, 7, 8); background vocals
- Daniel Moore – harmony vocals (tracks 2, 4, 8, 10); background vocals
- Wendy Waldman – harmony vocals (track 7)
- Maxine Willard Waters – harmony vocals (track 4)
- Julia Tillman Waters – harmony vocals (track 4)

=== Technical ===
- Val Garay – production, recording
- Niko Bolas – engineering assistance
- Doug Sax – mastering
- Mike Reese – mastering

=== Artwork ===
- Bill Burks – art direction, design
- David Alexander – photo

== Charts ==
=== Weekly charts ===
Weekly chart performance for Mistaken Identity
Chart (1981)	Peak position
Australian Albums (Kent Music Report)	2
Canada Top Albums/CDs (RPM)	4
Dutch Albums (Album Top 100)	36
Finnish Albums (Suomen virallinen lista)	6
German Albums (Offizielle Top 100)	3
Italian Albums (Musica e dischi)	6
New Zealand Albums (RMNZ)	1
Norwegian Albums (VG-lista)	1
Swedish Albums (Sverigetopplistan)	4
UK Albums (Official Charts)	26
US Billboard 200	1

=== Year-end charts ===
Year-end chart performance for Mistaken Identity
Chart (1981)	Position
Australian Albums (Kent Music Report)	26
Canada Top Albums/CDs (RPM)	27
German Albums (Offizielle Top 100)	40
New Zealand Albums (RMNZ)	18
US Billboard 200	15

== Certifications and sales ==
Certifications and sales for Mistaken Identity
Region	Certification	Certified units/sales
Australia	—	95,000
Canada (Music Canada)	3× Platinum	300,000^{^}
France (SNEP)	Gold	100,000^{*}
New Zealand (RMNZ)	Gold	7,500^{^}
United States (RIAA)	Platinum	1,000,000^{^}
^{*} Sales figures based on certification alone.^{^} Shipments figures based on certification alone.
