= The Greatest Hits: 1966–1992 =

Greatest Hits: 1966–1992

Greatest hits album by Neil Diamond
- Released: May 19, 1992
- Recorded: 1966–1992
- Genre: Rock
- Length: 140:08
- Label: Columbia
- Producer: various

Neil Diamond chronology
Lovescape (1991)	Greatest Hits: 1966–1992 (1992)	Glory Road: 1968–1972 (1992)

The Greatest Hits: 1966–1992 is a compilation album by Neil Diamond released in 1992. Songs from his years with Uni/MCA (1968–1972) are represented by live or studio re-recordings as noted below because MCA Records refused to license the masters to Columbia Records, something that would cause controversy.

== Track listing ==
Disc one

1. "Solitary Man"
2. "Cherry, Cherry"
3. "I Got the Feelin' (Oh No, No)"
4. "Thank the Lord for the Night Time"
5. "Girl, You'll Be a Woman Soon"
6. "Kentucky Woman"
7. "Shilo" (orig. 1967 version)
8. "You Got to Me"
9. "Brooklyn Roads" (1986 live version)
10. "Red Red Wine" (1989 live version)
11. "I'm a Believer" (1989 live version)
12. "Sweet Caroline" (1989 live version)
13. "Soolaimon" (1989 live version)
14. "Cracklin' Rosie" (1992 live version)
15. "Song Sung Blue" (1991 studio re-recording)
16. "Play Me" (1991 studio re-recording)
17. "Holly Holy" (1992 live version)
18. "Morningside" (1983 live version)
19. "Crunchy Granola Suite" (1992 live version)

Disc two

1. "Brother Love's Traveling Salvation Show" (1992 live version)
2. "I Am...I Said" (1992 live version)
3. "Be"
4. "Longfellow Serenade"
5. "Beautiful Noise"
6. "If You Know What I Mean"
7. "Desirée"
8. "September Morn"
9. "You Don't Bring Me Flowers" (duet with Barbra Streisand)
10. "Forever in Blue Jeans"
11. "Hello Again"
12. "America"
13. "Love on the Rocks"
14. "Yesterday's Songs"
15. "Heartlight"
16. "Headed for the Future"
17. "Heartbreak Hotel" (duet with Kim Carnes)
18. "All I Really Need Is You" (1992 live version)

== Charts ==
=== Weekly charts ===
Chart (1992)	Peak position
Australian Albums (ARIA)	1
Dutch Albums (Album Top 100)	20
New Zealand Albums (RMNZ)	2
UK Albums (OCC)	1
US Billboard 200	90

=== Year-end charts ===
Chart (1992)	Position
Australian Albums (ARIA)	7
Dutch Albums (Album Top 100)	96
New Zealand Albums (RMNZ)	38
Chart (1996)	Position
Australian Albums (ARIA)	42

== Certifications ==
Region	Certification	Certified units/sales
Australia (ARIA)	7× Platinum	490,000^{^}
New Zealand (RMNZ)	Gold	7,500^{^}
United Kingdom (BPI)	Platinum	300,000^{^}
United States (RIAA)	3× Platinum	3,000,000^{^}
^{^} Shipments figures based on certification alone.
