= Invitation to Dance =

Single by Kim Carnes

from the album That's Dancing!
- Released: January 1985
- Genre: Dance; disco
- Label: EMI America
- Songwriters: Kim Carnes; Dave Ellingson; Martin Page; Brian Fairweather
- Producer: Nile Rodgers

Licensed audio
- "Invitation to Dance" on YouTube

"Invitation to Dance" is a song by American singer-songwriter Kim Carnes. Carnes co-wrote the song with her husband, Dave Ellingson, and Martin Page and Brian Fairweather. The single was produced by Nile Rodgers for the soundtrack to the 1985 motion picture That's Dancing!.

== Background ==
"Invitation to Dance" is a disco track that Carnes recorded for the soundtrack to That's Dancing! (1985). Billboard magazine noted that Carnes became the first artist to have a solo recording, a duet, and a trio simultaneously on the Billboard Hot 100. At the time, she charted with "Invitation to Dance" (solo), "Make No Mistake, He's Mine" (a duet with Barbra Streisand), and "What About Me?" (a trio with Kenny Rogers and James Ingram).

== Critical reception ==
Brian Chin of Billboard described "Invitation to Dance" as "acceptable enough for pop radio", but "not quite as vividly celebratory as other dance-themed records".

== Charts ==
Chart (1985)	Peak position
US Adult Contemporary (Billboard)	32
US Billboard Hot 100	68
US Cash Box Top 100	62
US Hot Dance Club Songs	13
