= That's Dancing! =

1985 film directed by Jack Haley Jr.

- Theatrical release poster
- Directed by: Jack Haley Jr.
- Written by: Jack Haley Jr.
- Produced by: Jack Haley Jr. David Niven Jr.
- Starring: Mikhail Baryshnikov; Ray Bolger; Sammy Davis Jr.; Gene Kelly; Liza Minnelli
- Cinematography: Andrew Laszlo
- Edited by: Michael J. Sheridan
- Music by: Henry Mancini
- Production company: Metro-Goldwyn-Mayer
- Distributed by: MGM/UA Entertainment Company (United States); United International Pictures (International)
- Release date: January 18, 1985
- Running time: 105 minutes
- Country: United States
- Language: English
- Box office: $4,210,938

That's Dancing! is a 1985 American compilation film produced by Metro-Goldwyn-Mayer that looked back at the history of dancing in film. Unlike the That's Entertainment! series, this film not only focuses specifically on MGM films, but also included films from other studios.

A highlight of the film was the first theatrical release of a complete dance routine by Ray Bolger for his "If I Only Had a Brain" number that had been shortened in The Wizard of Oz.

== Summary ==
The hosts for this film are Gene Kelly (who also executive produced), Ray Bolger (his last film appearance before his death in 1987), Liza Minnelli, Sammy Davis Jr., and Mikhail Baryshnikov. Pop singer Kim Carnes was commissioned to sing an original song, "Invitation to Dance", that plays over the closing credits.

This film is sometimes considered part of the That's Entertainment! series, especially since its starting credits contain a card with the That's Entertainment! III title (not to be confused with the 1994 film), but even though it shared studio and producers, it is considered a separate production. Jack Haley Jr., who wrote, produced and directed the first That's Entertainment! film, also wrote and directed this one, co-producing with longtime friend David Niven Jr. Haley's father, Jack Haley, had co-starred with Bolger in The Wizard of Oz.

== Dedication ==
This film is dedicated to all dancers, especially those who devoted their lives to the development of their art long before there was a motion picture camera.

== Appearances ==
- Tommy Abbott
- June Allyson
- Ann-Margret
- Fred Astaire
- Lucille Ball
- Mikhail Baryshnikov
- Jennifer Beals
- David Bean
- Busby Berkeley
- Eric Blore
- Monte Blue
- Ray Bolger
- John Brascia
- Lucille Bremer
- James Cagney
- Irene Cara
- Leslie Caron
- Gower Champion
- Marge Champion
- Cyd Charisse
- Joan Crawford
- Dan Dailey
- Jacques d'Amboise
- Sammy Davis Jr.
- Doris Day
- Gloria DeHaven
- Isadora Duncan
- Buddy Ebsen
- Taina Elg
- Eliot Feld
- Margot Fonteyn
- Loie Fuller
- Clark Gable
- Judy Garland
- Virginia Gibson
- Cary Grant
- Jack Haley
- Margaret Hamilton
- Carol Haney
- June Haver
- Robert Helpmann
- Judy Holliday
- José Iturbi
- Michael Jackson
- Marine Jahan
- Van Johnson
- Ruby Keeler
- Gene Kelly
- Paula Kelly
- Michael Kidd
- Charles Laskey
- Ruta Lee
- Vivien Leigh
- Bambi Linn
- Peter Lorre
- Susan Luckey
- Shirley MacLaine
- Dean Martin
- Léonide Massine
- Matt Mattox
- Joan McCracken
- Ray McDonald
- Ann Miller
- Liza Minnelli
- James Mitchell
- Ricardo Montalbán
- Annabelle Moore
- Tony Mordente
- George Murphy
- Gene Nelson
- Julie Newmar
- The Nicholas Brothers
- Rudolf Nureyev
- Donald O'Connor
- Anna Pavlova
- Marc Platt
- Dick Powell
- Eleanor Powell
- Jane Powell
- Tommy Rall
- Debbie Reynolds
- Jeff Richards
- Chita Rivera
- Bill "Bojangles" Robinson
- Ginger Rogers
- Mickey Rooney
- Wini Shaw
- Moira Shearer
- Frank Sinatra
- Red Skelton
- Tucker Smith
- James Stewart
- Lyle Talbot
- Russ Tamblyn
- Lilyan Tashman
- Robert Taylor
- Anthony 'Scooter' Teague
- Shirley Temple
- Tamara Toumanova
- John Travolta
- Lana Turner
- Bobby Van
- Vera-Ellen
- Ethel Waters
- Bobby Watson
- Esther Williams
- David Winters
- Vera Zorina
- Vincent Price
- Robert Banas
- Francesca Bellini
- Betty Carr
- Carole D'Andrea
- Leroy Daniels
- Norma Doggett
- Harvey Evans
- Nancy Kilgas
- Bert Michaels
- Susan Oakes
- Gina Trikonis
- Tarita Teriipaia

== Films featured ==
- The Dumb Girl of Portici (1916)
- So This Is Paris (1926)
- Flying High (1931)
- 42nd Street (1933)
- Gold Diggers of 1933 (1933)
- Rufus Jones for President (1933)
- Dames (1934)
- The Gay Divorcee (1934)
- Gold Diggers of 1935 (1935)
- Broadway Melody of 1936 (1935)
- Roberta (1935)
- The Littlest Rebel (1935)
- Born to Dance (1936)
- Swing Time (1936)
- Honolulu (1939)
- The Wizard of Oz (1939)
- Gone with the Wind (1939)
- On Your Toes (1939)
- Down Argentine Way (1940)
- Babes on Broadway (1941)
- Yankee Doodle Dandy (1942)
- Bathing Beauty (1944)
- Kismet (1944)
- The All-Star Bond Rally (1945)
- The Harvey Girls (1946)
- Till the Clouds Roll By (1946)
- Ziegfeld Follies (1946)
- Good News (1947)
- The Red Shoes (1948)
- Neptune's Daughter (1949)
- Three Little Words (1950)
- Royal Wedding (1951)
- An American in Paris (1951)
- The Merry Widow (1952)
- Singin' in the Rain (1952)
- The Band Wagon (1953)
- Give a Girl a Break (1953)
- Kiss Me Kate (1953)
- Latin Lovers (1953)
- Seven Brides for Seven Brothers (1954)
- It's Always Fair Weather (1955)
- Jupiter's Darling (1955)
- Oklahoma! (1955)
- Carousel (1956)
- Invitation to the Dance (1956)
- Les Girls (1957)
- Silk Stockings (1957)
- Indiscreet (1958)
- tom thumb (1958)
- West Side Story (1961)
- Viva Las Vegas (1964)
- Sweet Charity (1969)
- The Boy Friend (1971)
- Cabaret (1972)
- Saturday Night Fever (1977)
- The Turning Point (1977)
- Fame (1980)
- Beat It (1982 music video by Michael Jackson; courtesy of Sony Music Entertainment via Epic Records)
- Flashdance (1983)

== Home media ==
That's Dancing! was not included when the three That's Entertainment! films were released on DVD in 2004; it was instead released on its own in 2007. The DVD includes several behind-the-scenes promotional featurettes from 1985 on the making of the film, as well as its accompanying music video featuring Kim Carnes singing "Invitation to Dance" although the DVD omits both the video and song itself.

== See also ==
- List of American films of 1985
