= Lovescape =

Studio album by Neil Diamond
- Released: August 27, 1991
- Recorded: 1990–1991
- Studio: Record One, Los Angeles; Arch Angel, Los Angeles; Ocean Way, Hollywood; Westlake, Los Angeles; Lion Share, Los Angeles; Abbey Road, London
- Genre: Soft rock; country
- Length: 60:43
- Label: Columbia
- Producer: Neil Diamond; Val Garay; Albert Hammond; Don Was; Peter Asher; Humberto Gatica

Neil Diamond chronology
The Best Years of Our Lives (1988)	Lovescape (1991)	The Greatest Hits: 1966–1992 (1992)

Professional ratings
Review scores
Source	Rating
AllMusic	2/5 stars
Q	4/5 stars

Lovescape is the nineteenth studio album by American singer Neil Diamond, released in 1991 by Columbia Records. The album peaked at number 44 on the US Billboard 200. "Hooked on the Memory of You" is a duet with Kim Carnes, while "Don't Turn Around" was written by Albert Hammond and Diane Warren and was originally sung by Tina Turner. Lovescape is Diamond's last album to credit him with playing guitar until his 2005 album, 12 Songs.

== Track listing ==
No.	Title	Writer(s)	Length
1.	"If There Were No Dreams"	Neil Diamond; Michel Legrand	3:15
2.	"Mountains of Love"	Diamond; Tom Hensley; Alan Lindgren	4:53
3.	"Don't Turn Around"	Albert Hammond; Diane Warren	3:49
4.	"Someone Who Believes in You"	Diamond	4:14
5.	"When You Miss Your Love"	Larry E. Williams	4:40
6.	"Fortune of the Night"	Diamond; Hensley; Lindgren	4:08
7.	"One Hand, One Heart"	Leonard Bernstein; Stephen Sondheim	3:02
8.	"Hooked on the Memory of You" (duet with Kim Carnes)	Diamond	2:51
9.	"Wish Everything Was Alright"	Diamond; Hadley Hockensmith; Doug Rhone	3:52
10.	"The Way"	Diamond; Hensley; Lindgren	4:51
11.	"Sweet L.A. Days"	Diamond; Rhone	4:12
12.	"All I Really Need Is You"	Diamond; Hensley; Lindgren	4:21
13.	"Lonely Lady #17"	Diamond; Vince Charles; King Errisson	3:58
14.	"I Feel You"	Hensley; Sam Cole	3:38
15.	"Common Ground"	Diamond; Hensley; Lindgren	4:50

== Personnel ==
Adapted from the album's liner notes.

=== Musicians ===
- Neil Diamond – vocals (all tracks), acoustic guitar (tracks 1, 2, 4, 6, 8–15), arranger (track 11)
- Kim Carnes – featured vocals (track 8)
- Rusty Anderson – guitar (track 3)
- Kenny Aronoff – drums (track 9)
- Peter Asher – tambourine (track 5), backing vocals arranger (track 5)
- Hilliard Atkinson – backing vocals (track 9)
- Harry Bowens – backing vocals (track 9)
- Susan Boyd – backing vocals (track 5)
- Robbie Buchanan – keyboards (tracks 3, 5), arranger (track 3), piano (track 7)
- David Campbell – arranger (tracks 5, 7), backing vocals arranger (track 5)
- Valerie Carter – backing vocals (track 5)
- Vince Charles – percussion (tracks 1, 2, 4, 6, 8, 10–15)
- Assa Drory – concertmaster (tracks 2, 6, 10, 12, 15)
- Tim Drummond – bass guitar (track 9)
- Dan Dugmore – pedal steel guitar (track 5)
- Sally Dworsky – backing vocals (track 9)
- King Errisson – congas (tracks 1, 2, 4, 6, 8, 10–15)
- Wendy Fraser – backing vocals (track 5)
- Claude Gaudette – keyboards (track 4)
- Bob Glaub – bass guitar (track 5)
- Andrew Gold – guitar (track 5)
- Mark Goldenberg – guitar (track 9)
- Tom Hensley – keyboards (tracks 1, 2, 4, 6, 8, 10–15), arranger (tracks 1, 2, 6, 8, 14)
- Hadley Hockensmith – guitar (tracks 1, 2, 4, 6, 10–15)
- Jimmy Johnson – piano (track 7)
- Raven Kane – backing vocals (track 5)
- Randy Kerber – keyboards (track 3)
- Larry Knechtel – piano (track 9)
- Alan Lindgren – keyboards (tracks 1, 2, 4, 6, 8, 10–15), arranger (tracks 1, 2, 4, 6, 8, 10, 12, 13, 15), original arrangement concept (track 7)
- Bob Magnusson – bass guitar (track 7)
- Bob Mann – guitar (track 5)
- Kate Markowitz – backing vocals (track 5)
- Jean McClain – backing vocals (track 3)
- Arnold McCuller – backing vocals (track 9)
- Linda Press – backing vocals (track 2, 6, 11, 13)
- Reinie Press – bass guitar (tracks 1, 2, 4, 6, 8, 10–15)
- Doug Rhone – guitar (tracks 1, 2, 4, 6, 8, 10–15), backing vocals (tracks 2, 6, 11, 13), arranger (track 11)
- Andrea Robinson – backing vocals (track 5)
- Leland Sklar – bass guitar (track 3)
- Stephanie Spruill – backing vocals (track 5)
- Benmont Tench – Hammond organ (track 9)
- Michael Thompson – guitar (tracks 3, 4)
- Joe Turano – backing vocals (track 3)
- Ron Tutt – drums (tracks 1, 2, 4, 6, 8, 10–15), backing vocals (tracks 2, 6, 11, 13)
- Carmen Twillie – backing vocals (track 5)
- Carlos Vega – drums (tracks 3, 5, 7), acoustic bass guitar (track 7)
- Terry Wood – backing vocals (tracks 3, 5)
- Gavyn Wright – concertmaster (tracks 5, 7)

=== Technical ===
- Val Garay – producer (tracks 1–8), recording engineer (tracks 1–8), mix engineer (tracks 1–8)
- Neil Diamond – producer (tracks 2, 6 & 10–15)
- Albert Hammond – producer (track 3)
- Humberto Gatica – producer (track 4), mix engineer (tracks 2, 3, 4, 6 & 10–15)
- Peter Asher – producer (tracks 5 & 7)
- Don Was – producer (track 9)
- Sam Cole – production coordinator
- Simon Franglen – programming (track 2)
- Larry Brown – recording engineer (track 2)
- Bernie Becker – recording engineer (tracks 2, 6 & 10–15)
- Darren Klein – recording engineer (track 3)
- Frank Wolf – recording engineer (tracks 5 & 7), mix engineer (tracks 5 & 7)
- Ed Cherney – recording engineer (track 9), mix engineer (track 9)
- Dan Bosworth – assistant engineer
- Guy DeFazio – assistant engineer
- Brad Eldridge – assistant engineer
- Matthew Gruber – assistant engineer
- Nathaniel Kunkel – assistant engineer
- Brett Swain – assistant engineer
- Alejandro Rodriguez – assistant mixing
- Mastered by George Marino at Sterling Sound, NYC.
- Recorded at Record One, Arch Angel Studios, Ocean Way Recording, Westlake Studios and Lion Share Recording (Los Angeles, CA); Abbey Road Studios (London, England)
- Overdubbed at Arch Angel Studios, 440 Sound Recorders, Ground Control Studios, Studio F and The Hop (Los Angeles, CA); Evergreen Studios (Burbank, CA).
- Mixed at Record One, Ground Control Studios and Record Plant (Los Angeles, CA); Conway Studios (Hollywood, CA); Encore Studios (Burbank, CA).
- David Kirschner – art direction and design
- Jan Weinberg – additional design
- Matthew Rolston – photography

== Charts ==
Chart (1991)	Peak position
Australian Albums (ARIA)	15
Dutch Albums (Album Top 100)	39
UK Albums (OCC)	36
US Billboard 200	44

== Certifications ==
Region	Certification	Certified units/sales
Australia (ARIA)	Gold	35,000^{^}
United Kingdom (BPI)	Gold	100,000^{^}
United States (RIAA)	Gold	500,000^{^}
^{^} Shipments figures based on certification alone.
