= Rest on Me =

Studio album by Kim Carnes
- Released: December 1971
- Recorded: 1971
- Studio: Hollywood Sound Recorders (Los Angeles, California).
- Genre: Pop rock
- Length: 33:36
- Label: Amos
- Producer: Jimmy Bowen

Kim Carnes chronology
Rest on Me (1971)	Kim Carnes (1975)

Singles from Rest on Me
- 1. "To Love" Released: November 1971; 2. "To Love Somebody" Released: February 1972

Rest on Me is the debut studio album by American singer-songwriter Kim Carnes, released in 1971 on Amos Records, and reissued on A&M Records in the late 1970s. The album (minus the opening song) was also released on CD on many European budget labels in the early 1990s - but with all tracks remixed and running at a markedly low speed. Most tracks were also lengthened, simply by repeating parts of the tracks. In 2012, the original album was remastered and made available, complete and at the correct speed, as an internet download in 2012 and on CD on the Essential Media Group label the following year.

== Background ==
Carnes began her recording career with the New Christy Minstrels. After meeting producer Jimmy Bowen in 1971, she signed a recording contract with Amos Records. Following the album's release, Carnes and her husband David Ellingson issued a standalone single titled "It's Love That Keeps It All Together", also produced by Bowen.

== Critical reception ==
Professional ratings
Review scores
Source	Rating
AllMusic	2/5 stars
The Encyclopedia of Popular Music	2/5 stars

Cash Box described "To Love" as "an interesting up tempo tune in a highly commercial vein", and a "fine performance" by Carnes. The magazine described Rest on Me as a "fabulous album", noting Carnes' ability to interpret songs well. Billboard noted the album's similarities with artists including Carole King, Carly Simon and Gayle McCormick, adding that Carnes is "distinctive in her own right".

== Track listing ==
Side one
No.	Title	Writer(s)	Length
1.	"It Takes Time"	Shirley Eikhard	2:45
2.	"Sweet Love Song to My Soul"	Daniel Moore	2:49
3.	"Everything Has Got to Be Free"	Bodie Chandler	2:54
4.	"Do You Wanna Dance?"	Bobby Freeman	2:46
5.	"I Won't Call You Back"	Kim Carnes	2:58
6.	"To Love"	Gerry Goffin; Carole King	2:54

Side two
No.	Title	Writer(s)	Length
7.	"To Love Somebody"	Barry Gibb; Robin Gibb	3:25
8.	"Fell in Love with a Poet"	Carnes	3:06
9.	"One More River to Cross"	Moore	2:23
10.	"You Can Do It to Me Anytime"	Baker Knight	2:59
11.	"Rest on Me"	Michael McGinnis	4:37
Total length:			33:36

== Personnel ==
Adapted from the album liner notes.

- Kim Carnes – lead vocals
- Larry Muhoberac – piano, organ, arrangements
- Larry Carlton – guitar
- Mike Deasy – guitar
- James Burton – guitar
- Bill Perry – bass
- Reinie Press – bass
- Ed Greene – drums
- Dennis St. John – drums
- Dave Ellingson – backing vocals
- Etham Goya – backing vocals
- Brooks Hunnicutt – backing vocals
- Danny Jimms – backing vocals
- Peter Morse – backing vocals
- Mike Settle – backing vocals
- Glen Hardin – piano (track 3)
- Gil Rogers – guitar (track 3)

=== Technical ===
- Jimmy Bowen – producer
- John Guess – engineer

=== Design ===
- Bruce Hinton – art direction
- Ken Kim – graphics, photography
- Kim Carnes – liner notes

== Release history ==
Release formats for Rest on Me
Region	Date	Format(s)	Label
United States	December 1971	LP	Amos
Canada	December 1971	LP	Amos
United States	1984	LP; cassette	MCA
Canada	1984	LP; cassette	MCA
Germany	2011	Digital download	Essential Media Group
Germany	2013	CD	Essential Media Group
