= St. Vincent's Court =

Studio album by Kim Carnes
- Released: February 1979
- Recorded: 1979
- Genre: Pop
- Label: EMI
- Producer: Kim Carnes; Dave Ellingson; Daniel Moore

Kim Carnes chronology
Sailin' (1976)	St. Vincent's Court (1979)	Romance Dance (1980)

St. Vincent's Court is the fourth studio album by Kim Carnes, released in 1979.

The album's single, "It Hurts So Bad", peaked at No. 56 on Billboard magazine's Pop Singles chart.

== Critical reception ==
Professional ratings
Review scores
Source	Rating
The Encyclopedia of Popular Music	2/5 stars

The Courier Journal noted that "the material runs from slightly country to slightly rhythm-and-blues to heavily ballad-like pop." The Richmond Times-Dispatch wrote that the album "samples everything now playing in pop, with Ms. Carnes struggling unsuccessfully to keep up with abrupt shifts in mood and song style."

== Track listing ==
1. "What Am I Gonna Do" (Kim Carnes, Dave Ellingson) – 2:58
2. "Jamaica Sunday Morning" (Carnes, Ellingson) – 4:23
3. "Stay Away" (Carnes) – 4:00
4. "Lookin' for a Big Night" (Carnes, Ellingson) – 3:54
5. "Paris Without You (St. Vincent's Court)" (Carnes, Ellingson) – 5:15
6. "It Hurts So Bad" (Carnes) – 3:02
7. "Lose in Love" (Carnes) – 3:45
8. "Skeptical Shuffle" (Carnes, Ellingson) – 3:30
9. "Take Me Home to Where My Heart Is" (Daniel Moore) – 3:13
10. "Blinded by Love" (Carnes, Ellingson) – 3:00
11. "Goodnight Moon" (Carnes, Ellingson) – 3:37

== Personnel ==
- Kim Carnes – lead vocals, backing vocals (1–3, 8, 10), melodica (1), rhythm track arrangements
- Bill Cuomo – acoustic piano (1, 3, 6, 7, 10, 11), keyboards (2, 8), electric piano (4), clavinet (4), Fender Rhodes (5), ARP String Ensemble (5), ARP String Synthesizer (7), additional string arrangements (7)
- Daniel Moore – melodica (1), backing vocals (1, 4, 9), harmony vocals (7), rhythm track arrangements
- Ron Barron – organ (6)
- Jim W. Gordon – organ (9), synthesizers (9)
- Dave Ellingson – rhythm guitars (1), banjo (1), melodica (1), backing vocals (1, 2, 4, 8–11), sound effects (2), guitars (11), rhythm track arrangements
- Steve Geyer – electric guitars (1), mandolin (1, 2), guitars (2, 7, 8), acoustic guitar (10)
- John Beland – dobro (1), acoustic guitars (6), mandolin (6), rhythm guitar (7)
- Bobby Cochram – guitars (3–5, 9), electric guitars (6, 10)
- Dominic Genova – bass guitar (1, 2, 7, 8, 10)
- Leland Sklar – bass guitar (3–5, 11)
- Reine Press – bass guitar (6)
- David Jackson – bass guitar (9)
- Matt Betton – drums (1–5, 7, 8, 10, 11)
- Richie Hayward – drums (6, 9)
- Larry Hirsch – percussion (1, 6), sound effects (2)
- Victor Feldman – marimba (2), percussion (2), congas (8, 10), vibraphone (8, 10)
- Bobbye Hall – percussion (4, 5)
- Gary Montgomery – harmonica (1)
- Jerry Peterson – saxophone (2, 5, 8, 10)
- Tim Weisberg – flutes (5)
- Darrell Leonard – trumpet (11)
- Jim Ed Norman – string arrangements and conductor
- Danny Timms – backing vocals (4, 11)
- Etan McElroy – backing vocals (4, 11)
- Matthew Moore – backing vocals (9)
- Brian Cadd – backing vocals (11)

Production

- Kim Carnes – producer
- Dave Ellingson – producer
- Daniel Moore – producer, recording engineer (9)
- Larry Hirsch – engineer, mixdown engineer
- Ron Borawski – second engineer
- Gary Lubow – second engineer
- Linda Tyler – second engineer
- Stewart Whitmore – second engineer
- Michael Carnevale – second engineer (6)
- Steve Escallier – additional engineer
- Beverly Jones – additional engineer
- Wally Heider – additional recording engineer (6)
- John Golden – mastering
- Jim Sintetos – mastering
- Kendun Recorders (Burbank, California) – mastering location
- John Kosh – art direction, design
- Jim Shea – cover photography
- Nancy Andrews – inner sleeve photography
