= Crazy in the Night (Barking at Airplanes) =

Single by Kim Carnes

from the album Barking at Airplanes
- B-side: "Oliver (Voice on the Radio)"
- Released: April 1985
- Length: 3:35
- Label: EMI America
- Songwriter: Kim Carnes
- Producers: Kim Carnes; Bill Cuomo

Kim Carnes singles chronology
"Invitation to Dance" (1985)	"Crazy in the Night (Barking at Airplanes)" (1985)	"Abadabadango" (1985)

Music video
- "Crazy in the Night (Barking at Airplanes)" on YouTube

"Crazy in the Night (Barking at Airplanes)" is a song by American singer-songwriter Kim Carnes and the lead single from her ninth studio album, Barking at Airplanes (1985). Written by Carnes, and co-produced with Bill Cuomo, the track was inspired by her eldest son's struggles with nightmares and fear of the dark as a child. It was released as a single in April 1985 by EMI America.

The song became one of Carnes' highest-charting singles, peaking at no. 15 on the Billboard Hot 100 and reaching the top 40 in various countries.

== Lyrics and composition ==
Carnes was inspired to write "Crazy in the Night (Barking at Airplanes)" due to her son Collin's fear of the dark as a child. She incorporated the album's title, Barking at Airplanes, into the song title as a parenthesis. "I had a golden retriever [..] Every time the airplanes would go over, she’d bark at the airplanes. I thought, that’s such a cool, crazy title for an album."

Writing for the GRAMMY Awards website, Crystal Larsen likened "Crazy in the Night" to the work of American songwriter and producer Jim Steinman.

== Track listings ==
- 7-inch single

A. "Crazy in the Night (Barking at Airplanes)" – 3:35
B. "Oliver (Voice on the Radio)" – 3:46

- 12-inch single

A. "Crazy in the Night (Barking at Airplanes)" (dance mix) – 5:10
B. "Barking at Airplanes (Part II)" (dub mix) – 4:59

== Credits and personnel ==
- Bill Cuomo – co-producer, synthesizers
- Craig Hull – background vocals
- Craig Krampf – drum programming, background vocals
- Daniel Moore – background vocals
- Dave Ellingson – background vocals
- David Egerton – second engineer
- Denny Densmore – second engineer
- Duane Seykora – additional second engineer
- Eric Blum – back cover photography
- George Marino – mastering at Sterling Sound (New York)
- Greg Gorman – cover photography
- Henry Marquez – art direction
- Judy Clapp – second engineer
- Kim Carnes – lead vocals, background vocals, co-producer
- Mark Ettel – recording engineer
- Matthew Rolston – inner sleeve photography
- Michael Brokaw (Kragen & Co.) – direction
- Mike Shipley – mixer
- Niko Bolas – additional engineer
- Richard Bosworth – additional second engineer
- Sabrina Bucharek – second engineer
- Steve MacMillan – second engineer
- Sue McGonigle – project coordinator
- Tony Chiappa – second engineer
- Vigon Seireeni – design
- Waddy Wachtel – electric guitar, background vocals

== Charts ==
Chart (1985)	Peak position
Australia (Kent Music Report)	21
Austria (Ö3 Austria Top 40)	8
Canada Top Singles (RPM)	18
European Airplay (European Hit Radio)	50
New Zealand (Recorded Music NZ)	11
South Africa (Springbok Radio)	3
US Billboard Hot 100	15
US Dance Club Songs (Billboard)	24
US Cash Box Top 100	22
Quebec (ADISQ)	37
