= Invisible Hands (song) =

Single by Kim Carnes

from the album Café Racers
- Released: October 1983
- Recorded: 1983
- Genre: Rock
- Length: 3:10 5:08 (dance version)
- Label: EMI America
- Songwriters: Martin Page; Brian Fairweather
- Producer: Keith Olsen

Music video
- "Invisible Hands" on YouTube

"Invisible Hands" is a song by American singer-songwriter Kim Carnes and the lead single from her eighth studio album, Café Racers (1983). It was written by Martin Page and Brian Fairweather, and produced by Keith Olsen.

It peaked at no. 40 on the US Billboard Hot 100, and was nominated for Best Female Rock Vocal Performance at the 27th Grammy Awards in 1985.

== Background and writing ==
"Invisible Hands" was written by Martin Page and Brian Fairweather of the British synthpop band Q-Feel. Carnes told ROCK magazine that she was inspired to record the song after reading about a historical case where an English man was wrongly convicted for murder. The real killer confessed his crime only after the innocent man had already been executed. "The title refers to what the murderer was feeling when the innocent man was in prison," Carnes stated. "If I had invisible hands, I would reach out and take you out of jail".

== Release and promotion ==
"Invisible Hands" was released as the lead single from Café Racers in October 1983. Its release was supported by a music video directed by James Yukich. Carnes performed the song live on American Bandstand.

The track was remixed by John "Jellybean" Benitez and released as a single in North America.

== Personnel ==
- Kim Carnes – lead vocals, backing vocals
- Bill Cuomo – keyboard solo
- David Paich – keyboard bass
- Steve Lukather – guitar
- Mark Andes – bass
- Dennis Carmassi – drums
- Brian Fairweather – Simmons drums, backing vocals
- Martin Page – backing vocals, Roland Jupiter 8

== Format and track listings ==
7" Single

- A "Invisible Hands" (FM Mix) (3:09)
- B "I'll Be Here Where the Heart Is" (4:42)

12" Single

- A "Invisible Hands" (Dance Mix) (5:04)
- B "Invisible Hands" (FM Mix) (3.09)

== Chart performance ==
Chart (1983)	Peak position
Canada Top Singles (RPM)	44
US Billboard Hot 100	40
US Cash Box Top 100	34
