= Donna Weiss =

American singer and songwriter

- Born: Donna Terry Weiss
- Origin: Virginia, Richmond
- Genres: Pop, rock
- Occupations: Singer-songwriter, recording artist, lyricist

Donna Terry Weiss is an American singer and songwriter.

She is best known for writing the songs "Bette Davis Eyes" and "The Heart Won't Lie" (which reached number one respectively on the Billboard Hot 100 and Hot Country Singles charts). For "Bette Davis Eyes", she won the 1982 Grammy Award for Song of the Year. Bette Davis Eyes also won 1982 Record of The Year.

== Biography ==
Weiss was born in Virginia.

== Select compositions ==
- "Bette Davis Eyes" (1974) with Jackie DeShannon
- "The Heart Won't Lie" (1993) with Kim Carnes
- "When the Money's Gone" (1995) with Bruce Roberts
- "Explícame" (2011)
- "Peachy Keen" (2019)
- "The Air You Breathe" (1992)
- "Sweet Amarillo" (2014)Old Crow Medicine Show
- "Hold An Old Friend's Hand" (1988)
- "Spanish Eyes"
- "I Turn Around and Love You" (2014)
- "Don't Cry Now" (1993)
- "Lighthouse" (1986)
- "That's Where the Trouble Lies" (1986)
- "Divided Hearts" (1986)
- "Piece of the Sky" (1986)
- "Only Lonely Love" (1986)
- "View from the House" (1988)
- "Brass and Batons" (1988)
- "Blood from the Bandit" (1988)
- "Crimes of the Heart" (1988)
- "Just to Spend Tonight with You" (1988)
- "Checkin' Out The Ghosts" (1991)
- "Tears Edge" (1991)
- "River Of Memories" (1991)
- "Look Through Children's Eyes" (1991)
- "Nothing Better Than Love" (1991)
- "Chinese Wall/Inside Out" (2012)
- "Echo My Heart" (2012)
- "Welcome to the Club" (2012)
- "What Do You Do When Love Dies" (1992)
- "That Man is my Weakness" (1971)
- "Ruthless"(Tiffany) 1988
- "Bette Davis Eyes" Taylor Swift 2011

== Discography ==
Singles

- "I'm Only Human/Bonafide Love Me", 1969
- "One Night a Week/That Kind of Woman", 1970
- "I Want You/Take Me Now", 1969, Tony and Terri
- "California L.A./Everybody Can't Play Shortstop", 1967, Tony and Terri
- "Mr. Flower Vendor Man/Shades of Gray", 1968, Tony and Terri
- "Back on My Feet Again/For No One", Toni and Terri

As backing vocalist

- Joe Cocker – Mad Dogs & Englishmen (1970)
- Al Kooper – New York City (You're A Woman) (1971)
- Priscilla Jones – Gypsy Queen (1971)
- Rita Coolidge – Rita Coolidge (1971)
- Sandy Szigeti – America's Sweetheart (1971)
- Ry Cooder – Into the Purple Valley (1972)
- Rita Coolidge – The Lady's Not for Sale (1972)
- Hoyt Axton – Less Than The Song (1972)
- Bob Dylan – Pat Garrett & Billy the Kid Knocking on Heavens Door, (1973)
- Brenda Patterson – Brenda Patterson (1973)
- Sharon Cash – Sharon Cash (1973)
- Kim Carnes "Lighthouse" (1986)
