= Bette Davis Eyes =

1981 single by Kim Carnes

Single by Kim Carnes

from the album Mistaken Identity
- B-side: "Miss You Tonite"
- Released: March 10, 1981
- Studio: Record One (Los Angeles, California)
- Genre: New wave; soft rock; synth-rock; synth-pop
- Length: 3:48
- Label: EMI America
- Songwriter: Donna Weiss · Jackie DeShannon
- Producer: Val Garay

Kim Carnes singles chronology
"Cry Like a Baby" (1980)	"Bette Davis Eyes" (1981)	"Draw of the Cards" (1981)

Music video
- "Bette Davis Eyes" on YouTube

Audio sample
- file; help

"Bette Davis Eyes" is a song written and composed by Donna Weiss and Jackie DeShannon in 1974. It was recorded by DeShannon that year but made popular by Kim Carnes in 1981 when it spent nine non-consecutive weeks at the top of the U.S. Billboard Hot 100. It won the 1982 Grammy Awards for Song of the Year and Record of the Year. The music video was directed by Australian film director Russell Mulcahy.

On the Billboard Hot 100, the song was No. 1 for five weeks, interrupted for just one week by "Stars on 45" before it returned to the top spot for another four weeks, becoming Billboard's biggest hit of the year. The single also reached No. 5 on Billboard's Top Tracks charts and No. 26 on the Dance charts. It reached No. 2 in Canada for twelve consecutive weeks, and was 1981's No. 2 hit in that country, after "Stars on 45". It peaked at No. 10 in the United Kingdom, to date Carnes's only Top 40 hit in that country. Additionally, it ranked No. 12 on Billboard's list of the top 100 songs in the first 50 years of the magazine's Hot 100. "Bette Davis Eyes" was a No. 1 hit in 21 countries.

== Background ==
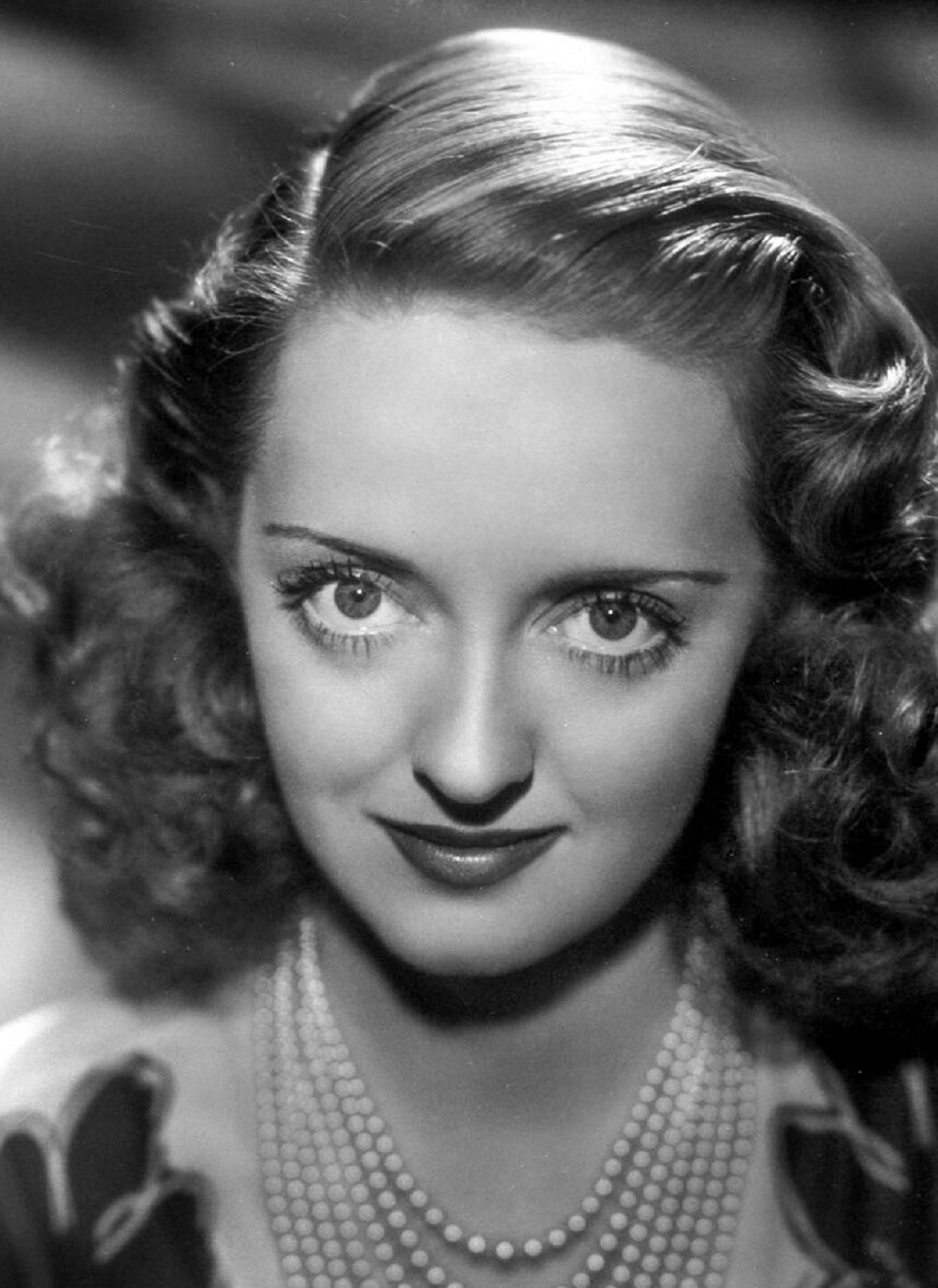
Bette Davis in 1939

"Bette Davis Eyes" was written in 1974 by Donna Weiss and Jackie DeShannon, the latter of whom recorded the song that same year for her album New Arrangement. Weiss had traveled to DeShannon's house with a set of lyrics, including several additional verses that were ultimately scrapped. DeShannon refined some of the lyrics and also developed the song's music. In this original incarnation, the track is performed in an "R&B lite" arrangement, featuring a prominent uptempo piano part, as well as flourishes of pedal steel guitar and horns. However, it was not until March 1981, when Carnes recorded her version of the song in a radically different synthesizer-based arrangement, that it became a commercial success.

According to producer Val Garay, the original demo of the tune that was brought to him sounded like "a Leon Russell track, with this beer-barrel polka piano part." (Note: The demo can be heard in a TAXI TV interview with Garay, at 21:50.) Carnes initially rejected the song based on the demo's arrangement, until keyboardist Bill Cuomo, using the Prophet-5 synthesizer, came up with the signature riff that defines Carnes's version. In an interview with Dick Clark on the National Music Survey, Carnes credited Cuomo with the song's new arrangement, saying that "the minute he came up with that, then it fell into place. Everybody went, 'That's it!'"

Only three takes were recorded, the first of which was used with no overdubbing. Craig Krampf insisted on incorporating a Synare electronic drum into the song, although Garay objected to the instrument's inclusion on the grounds that it was "the most annoying thing I'd ever heard in my life." However, Garay changed his mind once Krampf hit the Synare on the chorus and found the instrument to be a great addition to the song. The drums were miked at close proximity using a Sennheiser MD 421 on the bass drum, a Shure 56 and Sennheiser MD 441 on the snare drum, Telefunken 251s on the toms, and an AKG 452 on the hi-hat. Carnes sang her vocals through a Neumann U67 microphone situated next to the mixing console.

Actress Bette Davis was 73 when Carnes's version became a hit. She wrote letters to Carnes, Weiss, and DeShannon to thank them for making her "a part of modern times" and said that her grandson now looked up to her. After their Grammy wins, Davis sent them roses and happily accepted the gift of gold and platinum records from Carnes, hanging them on her wall. The opening line, "Her hair is Harlow gold" is a tribute to starlet Jean Harlow, the leading sex symbol of early 1930s films, often nicknamed the "Blonde Bombshell" and the "Platinum Blonde", whose look inspired Marilyn Monroe, Madonna, and others.

== Critical reception ==
Record World called it a "haunting pop-rocker" and said that Carnes's "earthy vocal rasp and guitar chimes are unforgettable." Joe Viglione of AllMusic believed that "Bette Davis Eyes" was superior to all other tracks on Mistaken Identity.

Critics' rankings of "Bette Davis Eyes"
Publication	List	Rank	Ref.
Billboard	The 500 Best Pop Songs	425	
Rolling Stone	The 200 Best Songs of the 1980s	137	

== Track listing and formats ==
- 7-inch single
1. "Bette Davis Eyes" – 3:45
2. "Miss You Tonite" – 5:11
- US 12-inch maxi-single
1. "Bette Davis Eyes" – 3:45
2. "Miss You Tonite" – 5:11

== Charts ==
=== Weekly charts ===
Year	Chart	Peak position
1981	Australia (Kent Music Report)	1
1981	Austria (Ö3 Austria Top 40)	2
1981	Belgium (Ultratop 50 Flanders)	5
1981	Canada Top Singles (RPM)	2
1981	Canada Adult Contemporary (RPM)	1
1981	Denmark (IFPI)	4
1981	Ecuador (Record World)	1
1981	Finland (Suomen virallinen lista)	1
1981	France (IFOP)	1
1981	Ireland (IRMA)	5
1981	Italy (Musica e Dischi)	1
1981	Luxembourg (Radio Luxembourg)	1
1981	Netherlands (Dutch Top 40)	16
1981	Netherlands (Single Top 100)	17
1981	New Zealand (Recorded Music NZ)	2
1981	Norway (VG-lista)	1
1981	Quebec (ADISQ)	1
1981	South Africa (Springbok Radio)	1
1981	Spain (AFE)	1
1981	Sweden (Sverigetopplistan)	4
1981	Switzerland (Schweizer Hitparade)	1
1981	UK Singles (Official Charts)	10
1981	US Adult Contemporary (Billboard)	15
1981	US Billboard Hot 100	1
1981	US Cash Box Top 100	1
1981	US Dance Club Songs (Billboard)	26
1981	US Mainstream Rock Airplay (Billboard)	5
1981	US Record World Singles	1
1981	West Germany (GfK)	1
1981	Zimbabwe (ZIMA)	1
1997	Ireland (IRMA)	21
2002	Austria (Ö3 Austria Top 40)	67
2007	Denmark (Tracklisten)	14
2013	Slovenia (SloTop50)	45

=== Year-end charts ===
Chart (1981)	Rank
Australia (Kent Music Report)	6
Austria (Ö3 Austria Top 40)	16
Belgium (Ultratop 50 Flanders)	37
Canada Top Singles (RPM)	2
France (IFOP)	4
New Zealand (Recorded Music NZ)	6
South Africa (Springbok Radio)	2
Switzerland (Schweizer Hitparade)	2
US Billboard Hot 100	1
US Cash Box Top 100	2
West Germany (Official German Charts)	10

=== All-time charts ===
Chart	Rank
US Billboard Hot 100	17

== Certifications ==
Region	Certification	Certified units/sales
Brazil (Pro-Música Brasil)	Gold	100,000
Canada (Music Canada)	Platinum	100,000^{^}
Denmark (IFPI Danmark)	Gold	45,000^{‡}
France (SNEP)	Platinum	1,000,000^{*}
Germany (BVMI)	Gold	300,000^{‡}
Italy (FIMI) sales since 2009	Platinum	100,000^{‡}
New Zealand (RMNZ)	2× Platinum	60,000^{‡}
Spain (Promusicae)	Platinum	60,000^{‡}
United Kingdom (BPI) 2004 release	Platinum	600,000^{‡}
United States (RIAA)	Gold	1,000,000^{^}
^{*} Sales figures based on certification alone.^{^} Shipments figures based on certification alone.^{‡} Sales+streaming figures based on certification alone.

== Other versions ==
=== Gwyneth Paltrow version ===
American actress Gwyneth Paltrow covered "Bette Davis Eyes" for the soundtrack for the 2000 road trip film Duets. This version was released as a single in Australia on March 26, 2001, debuting and peaking at No. 3 on the ARIA Singles Chart on April 8, 2001. It spent nine weeks in the top 10, and came in at No. 35 on Australia's year-end chart for 2001. It earned a platinum certification from the Australian Recording Industry Association for shipping more than 70,000 units.

=== Taylor Swift live performance ===
American singer Taylor Swift included a live performance cover of "Bette Davis Eyes" on her 2011 Speak Now World Tour – Live album.

=== Ethel Cain homage ===
American singer Ethel Cain performed the song at a concert in Paris as a tribute to old Hollywood in June 2024. Cain released the single "Fuck Me Eyes," which has been interpreted as a spiritual "sequel" to the original, which she called one of her favorite songs ever.

=== JoJo Siwa cover ===
American reality star and singer JoJo Siwa released a version of the song on July 11, 2025. She debuted the song at a live performance the previous May, dedicated to her boyfriend, reality star Chris Hughes. Kim Carnes made a statement to TMZ criticizing the cover as "a bit too close" to her own version.

== In popular media ==
Kim Carnes' version of the song has appeared in various films and TV series including 200 Cigarettes (1999), Cold Case S1E6 (2003), That's My Boy (2012) The Final Girls (2015), American Horror Story S5E5 (2015), Riverdale S2E18 (2018), The After Party (2018), Anaïs in Love (2021), The Tourist S1E1 (2022), Angelyne S1E3 (2022), MaXXXine (2024) and And Just Like That... S3 E7.

== See also ==
- List of number-one singles in Australia during the 1980s
- List of Top 25 singles for 1981 in Australia
- List of Billboard Hot 100 number-one singles of 1981
- Billboard Year-End Hot 100 singles of 1981
- List of Cash Box Top 100 number-one singles of 1981
- List of number-one singles of 1981 (France)
- List of number-one hits of 1981 (Germany)
- List of number-one hits (Italy)
- List of number-one songs in Norway
- List of number-one singles of 1981 (Spain)
- List of number-one singles of the 1980s (Switzerland)
