= Kim Carnes =

American singer and songwriter (born 1945)

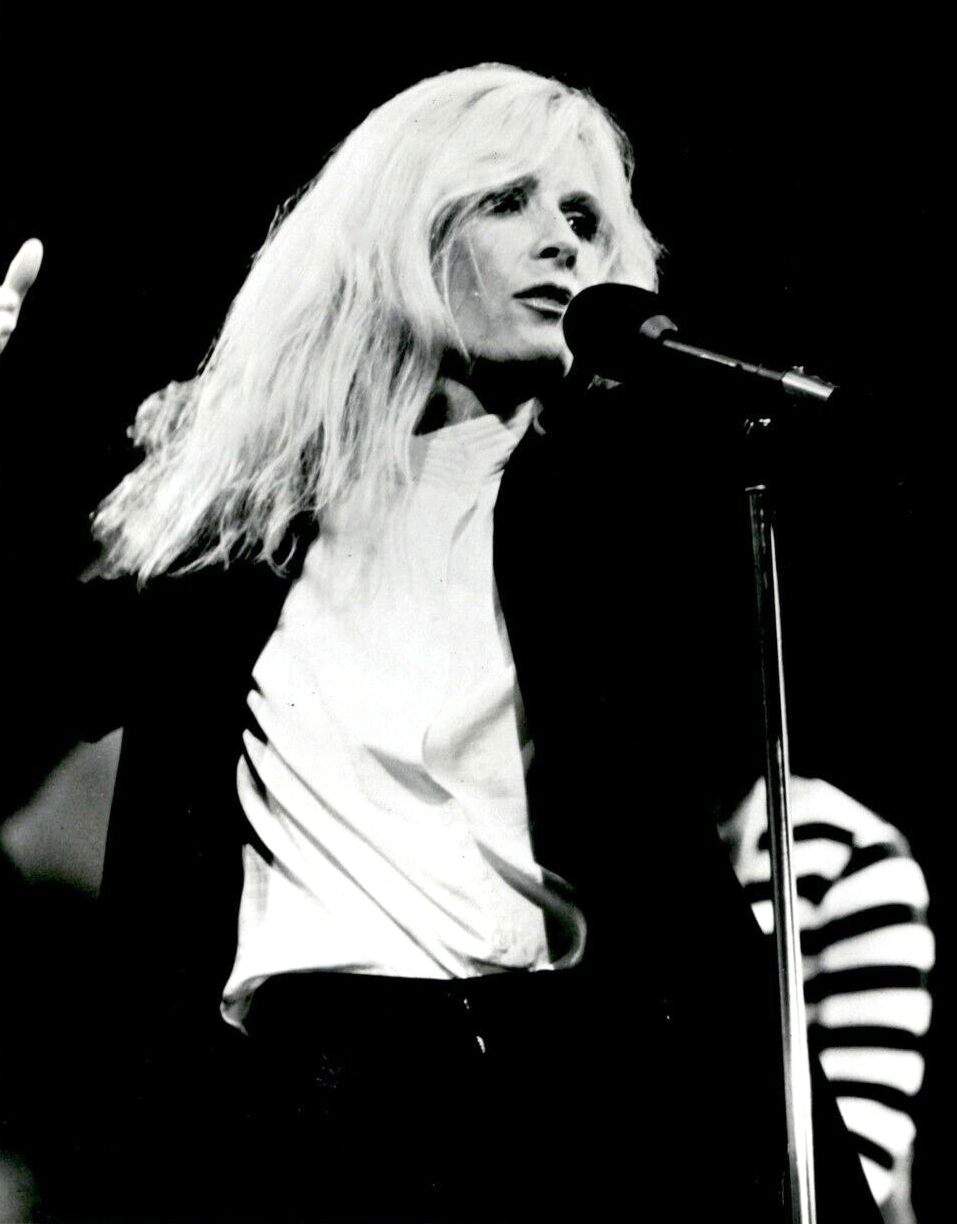
- Carnes performing in 1981

Background information
- Born: Kim Carnes; July 20, 1945 (age 81); Los Angeles, California, U.S.
- Genres: Pop rock; soft rock; country; folk
- Occupations: Singer; songwriter
- Works: Kim Carnes discography
- Years active: 1962–present
- Labels: Amos; A&M; EMI America; MCA; Sparky Dawg
- Spouse: David Ellingson (m. 1967)
- Website: kimcarnes.com

Kim Carnes (/kɑːrnz/; born July 20, 1945) is an American singer and songwriter best known for her 1981 hit single, "Bette Davis Eyes". She embarked on a solo career as a songwriter and performer in the early 1970s and also worked for several years as a session background singer with the Waters Sisters, Maxine Waters Willard and Julia Waters Tillman, who were later featured in the 2013 documentary 20 Feet from Stardom. In 1971, Carnes released her debut album, Rest on Me. Released in 1975, Carnes's self-titled second album included her first charting single, "You're a Part of Me", which reached No. 32 on the Billboard Adult Contemporary chart. The following year, Carnes released Sailin', which featured "Love Comes from Unexpected Places". The song won the American Song Festival and the award for Best Composition at the Tokyo Song Festival in 1976.

In her breakthrough year, 1980, Carnes and her husband, David Ellingson, were commissioned by Kenny Rogers to co-write the songs for his concept album Gideon. Her duet with Rogers, "Don't Fall in Love with a Dreamer", hit No. 4 on the Billboard Hot 100 and earned the duo a Grammy Award nomination. Later that year, Carnes's cover of Smokey Robinson's "More Love", from her fifth album, Romance Dance, hit No. 10. In 1981, Carnes released Mistaken Identity, which featured the chart-topping "Bette Davis Eyes". A worldwide hit, it became the best-selling single of the year in the United States. "Bette Davis Eyes" spent nine weeks at No. 1 on the Billboard Hot 100, went Gold, and won the Grammy Award for Record of the Year and the Song of the Year. Mistaken Identity reached No. 1 on the Billboard 200, was certified Platinum, and was nominated for the Grammy Award for Album of the Year.

Carnes also had success with the singles "Draw of the Cards", "Crazy in the Night (Barking at Airplanes)", "Make No Mistake, He's Mine" with Barbra Streisand, "What About Me?" featuring Kenny Rogers and James Ingram, and the Grammy Award-nominated singles "Voyeur" and "Invisible Hands". Her successes as a songwriter include co-writing the No. 1 duet "The Heart Won't Lie" with Donna Weiss; it was recorded by Vince Gill and Reba McEntire and was released on McEntire's 1993 album It's Your Call. Carnes also wrote the 1984 pop duet “Make No Mistake, He’s Mine”, which she sang with Barbra Streisand. The song was later reworked into a duet between Ronnie Milsap and Kenny Rogers, reaching #1 on the country charts. Her most recent studio album is Chasin' Wild Trains (2004).

== Early life ==
Kim Carnes was born on July 20, 1945, in Los Angeles. Her father, James Raymond Carnes, was an attorney and her mother was a hospital administrator. Kim Carnes knew she would be a singer and songwriter from the age of three, despite the fact that she was not born into a musical family. "My mother didn't get my career, and my father, who was an attorney, didn't think singing and writing was even a job."

== Career ==
=== Early solo career and first studio album ===
Kim Carnes signed her first publishing deal with producer Jimmy Bowen. During this period, she shared demo-recording time with Bowen's other writers, including Don Henley, Glenn Frey, and JD Souther. Carnes also sang "Nobody Knows", written by Mike Settle, which was featured prominently in the 1971 film Vanishing Point. The film also featured Carnes's first cut as a songwriter, "Sing Out for Jesus", which was recorded by Willie Mae "Big Mama" Thornton. After signing with Amos Records, her first solo album Rest on Me was released in 1971. It was produced by Jimmy Bowen.

In the early 1970s, Carnes and husband Dave Ellingson co-wrote several songs with David Cassidy, who was then at the peak of his career as an international idol. Carnes and Ellingson toured the world with Cassidy as an opening act. Cassidy's albums Rock Me Baby, Dreams are Nuthin' More than Wishes, and Cassidy Live! include several songs penned by Carnes along with Ellingson and Cassidy. Carnes also provided backing vocals for these albums.

=== 1975–1979: Early chart successes ===
In 1975, Carnes released her self-titled second album on A&M Records, and her first chart hit, "You're a Part of Me", written by Carnes, reached No. 32 on the US Adult Contemporary chart. Also recorded by both Rita Coolidge and Anne Murray, Carnes re-recorded this track with Gene Cotton three years later. The majority of tracks on this second album were written by Carnes and Ellingson.

Her third album Sailin' was produced by Jerry Wexler and released in 1976. One track, "Love Comes from Unexpected Places", won Grand Prize at the 1976 American Song Festival. The song also earned the award for Best Composition at the Tokyo Song Festival. It gained additional notice after it was recorded by Barbra Streisand on her 1977 album Superman. Streisand also recorded Carnes's "Stay Away" on her 1978 album Songbird. In spite of Streisand's endorsement of her material, Carnes's own Top 40 breakthrough did not occur until 1978 when Gene Cotton recruited her to record a duet version of "You're a Part of Me", which reached No. 36 on the Billboard Hot 100.

In 1979, using the pseudonym "Connie con Carne", Carnes recorded a song titled "She Dances with Meat", written by herself and Dave Ellingson. The song was also recorded by country comedy duo Pinkard & Bowden on their 1989 live album.

=== 1980–1981: Collaboration with Kenny Rogers and "Bette Davis Eyes" ===
In 1980, her duet with Kenny Rogers "Don't Fall in Love with a Dreamer" became a major hit on the Pop (No. 4), Country (No. 3) and Adult Contemporary (No. 2) charts. The song was culled from Rogers's concept album Gideon, written entirely by Carnes and her husband Dave Ellingson. Later that year, her cover version of the Smokey Robinson & The Miracles song "More Love" became her first solo top-10 hit (number 10 in the pop charts and number six in the Adult Contemporary charts). Robinson was, indeed, so impressed with Carnes's recording and success with the song that he later wrote and composed "Being with You" for her. However Robinson's then producer George Tobin insisted instead that he record and release the song himself. "The record that went number one for me is a demo for Kim," Robinson told The Huffington Post. In 1981, Carnes provided backing vocals on Dionne Warwick's No Night So Long album.

In 1981, Carnes recorded the Jackie DeShannon and Donna Weiss song "Bette Davis Eyes", originally written and composed in 1974. As the first single released from the album Mistaken Identity, it spent nine weeks at number one on the U.S. singles charts and became a worldwide hit. The song's success propelled the album to number one on the Billboard 200 for four weeks. The single became the biggest hit of the entire year for 1981, and is second only to Olivia Newton-John's "Physical" as the biggest hit of the 1980s in the U.S., according to Billboard. The song earned both the Record of the Year and Song of the Year awards at the 1982 Grammy Awards. Carnes was nominated for Best Pop Female, and Mistaken Identity also earned a nomination for Album of the Year. Two follow-up singles were released from the album, the title track and "Draw of the Cards", which also charted in the UK and Australia.

Carnes and her band rehearsed "Bette Davis Eyes" in the studio for three days to take the melody and overall sound of the record to a darker, more haunting place. Produced by Val Garay, the song's signature instrumental lick was created by keyboard player Bill Cuomo. Carnes and her band, including Cuomo, recorded a completely new arrangement of the song, the next day, with no overdubs.

Bette Davis admitted to being a fan of the song and approached Carnes and the songwriters to thank them. Davis wrote to Carnes after the song was released, saying she loved the song. "It was a thrill to become a part of the rock generation," she said in her memoir This 'N That. Davis's grandson Ashley told the screen legend that she had "finally made it". Carnes and Davis struck up a special friendship, with the singer visiting her at her home several times before Davis's death in 1989. In what she considers a career highlight, Carnes performed the song live for Davis at a tribute to the legendary actress held just before her death. More recently, the song was used in a 2008 Clairol Nice 'n Easy TV commercial in the United Kingdom, and the ad featuring the song expanded into South Africa and other territories around the world. In 2008, the song was featured in the opening scene of the documentary film Valentino: The Last Emperor and continues to be licensed for film and TV use. In November 2015, the song was the set piece for the back-story of Liz Taylor in the TV anthology American Horror Story: Hotel.

=== 1982–1987: Voyeur and further releases ===
Carnes's later hits included two more singles that just missed the pop top 10: "Crazy in the Night" (from Barking at Airplanes) and "What About Me?" with Kenny Rogers and James Ingram. Kim also reached the Adult Contemporary Top 10 four times after "Bette Davis Eyes"–with "I Pretend" (No. 9), "What About Me?" (No. 1), "Make No Mistake, He's Mine" with Barbra Streisand (No. 8) (co-produced by Carnes with Bill Cuomo) and "Crazy in Love" (No. 10). On January 19, 1985, Carnes had the distinction of being on the Billboard Hot 100 with three singles simultaneously, "What About Me", "Make No Mistake, He's Mine", and "Invitation to Dance" from the soundtrack to the film That's Dancing! It meant that she was on the chart as a solo artist in addition to being part of a duo and a trio.

Carnes was nominated for a Grammy Award for Best Rock Vocal Performance Female for Voyeur. The song "Looker" from that album was on the soundtrack for the 1981 film Looker. In 1983, she was nominated again as Best Rock Vocal Performance Female for "Invisible Hands". The Carnes song "I'll Be Here Where the Heart Is" was on the soundtrack for the 1983 film Flashdance soundtrack.

Carnes was among the artists who collaborated on the USA for Africa fundraising single "We Are the World" in 1985, shown in the music video and heard singing the last line of the song's bridge with Huey Lewis and Cyndi Lauper. Carnes sang "My Heart Has a Mind of Its Own" in a duet with Jeffrey Osborne for the soundtrack to the 1987 parody Spaceballs. In the same year, Carnes recorded "The Heart Must Have a Home" for the American drama film Summer Heat.

=== 1988–1997: Return to Nashville and Japanese releases ===
Carnes reunited with producer Jimmy Bowen for her eleventh album View from the House, released in July 1988. It peaked at no. 36 on the Billboard Top Country Albums chart. Featuring musicians including Vince Gill, Lyle Lovett, Steve Wariner and Bruce Hornsby, the album was described as a return to the country and folk influences of her early albums. "Crazy in Love" was released as the album's lead single, peaking at no. 13 on Billboard's Adult Contemporary chart.

In 1991, Carnes recorded the single "Hooked on the Memory of You" as a duet with Neil Diamond for his album Lovescape. A second track titled "Hard Times for Lovers" was released as a bonus track. In 1992, Diamond released a compilation album titled The Greatest Hits: 1966–1992, which featured a third duet with Carnes, a cover of "Heartbreak Hotel".

In 1993, Carnes released Gypsy Honeymoon: The Best of Kim Carnes. The title track peaked at No. 65 in Germany.

In 1997, Carnes co-wrote "Just One Little Kiss" with Greg Barnhill for Lila McCann's debut album Lila.

=== Since 1998: Further songwriting success and Chasin' Wild Trains ===
Numerous country artists recorded Carnes's songs in the late 1990s and early 2000s, including Smokie's version of "When the Walls Come Down" for Wild Horses – The Nashville Album (1998), Tim McGraw's version of "You Don't Love Me Anymore" for A Place in the Sun (1999), and Collin Raye's version of "Gypsy Honeymoon" for Can't Back Down (2001). Carnes provided backing vocals on the latter two recordings.

In June 2004, Carnes released her thirteenth and latest studio album, Chasin' Wild Trains, featuring songs co-written with Angelo Petraglia, Matraca Berg, Kim Richey, Al Anderson, Jeffrey Steele, Marc Jordan, Anders Osborne, and Chuck Prophet. The album was noted for its Americana and alt-country influences; it was compared to the musical styles of Stevie Nicks, Lucinda Williams and Melissa Etheridge. In the same year, Carnes provided backing vocals for two tracks on Tim McGraw's album Live Like You Were Dying.

Throughout the 2000s, Carnes continued to write and record songs for movie soundtracks, including "Ring of Fire" with Jeff Bridges for The Contender (2000), "The Silver Cord" for Loggerheads (2005), and "It's a Mighty Hand" for Chances: The Women of Magdalene (2006).

In 2007, Carnes recorded "It's Clear Sky Again Today" for a tribute album to the Japanese singer-songwriter Noriyuki Makihara, and a cover of the Rolling Stones' song "Tumbling Dice" with Jill Johnson for her album Music Row. Subsequent songwriting credits include "Enough" for Dana Cooper on his album The Conjurer (2010), "Live to Tell" for Alyssa Reid's album The Game (2011), and three tracks for the Australian country duo O'Shea.

In October 2012, American label Culture Factory reissued Carnes's Mistaken Identity, Voyeur and Cafe Racers albums. Light House and Barking at Airplanes followed in August 2013. In 2013, Carnes featured in an episode of the LMN series The Haunting of....

In May 2015, Carnes was interviewed by singer-songwriter Peter Cooper at the Country Music Hall of Fame and Museum in Nashville. In the same year, Carnes co-wrote and performed backing vocals on two tracks from Dana Cooper's album Building a Human Being. She also recorded a cover of "Under My Thumb" by The Rolling Stones for 80s Re:Covered, a conceptual compilation album featuring songs from the 70s recorded with the production style of the 80s. In the following year, Carnes was featured on "To Be with You Again" from Frankie Miller's duets album, Double Take.

In 2021, Carnes performed at the Rheneypalooza Jam, an online concert and auction to raise funds for St. Jude Children's Research Hospital in Memphis.

The majority of Carnes's recorded output will be featured in a forthcoming 10-CD boxed set, titled Universal Songs: The A&M, EMI America & MCA Years, set for release on October 23, 2026. Each disc, featuring full studio albums recorded from 1975 to 1988, will also include previously unissued bonus tracks.

In 2026, Carnes relocated back to her hometown of Los Angeles, Ca.

== Artistry ==
=== Musical and vocal style ===
Carnes's voice has been described as "distinctively raspy" and "throaty", leading to comparisons to the voices of Rod Stewart and Bonnie Tyler. In 1993, Keith Tuber of Orange Coast magazine referred to Carnes as "The Queen of Rasp 'n' Roll" in one of his articles.

== Personal life ==
Carnes has been married to husband Dave Ellingson since November 1967. In 2026, the couple moved back to California from their Nashville residence, where they had lived since 1994. They have two sons, Collin and Ry.

Ry is named after musician Ry Cooder. Collin is featured on the album “Barking at Airplanes” at the beginning of the song "Crazy in the Night". Collin co-wrote, with his mother, the songs "Divided Hearts", "Gypsy Honeymoon", "Don't Cry Now", and "River of Memories".

== Awards ==
=== Grammy Awards ===
The Grammy Awards are awarded annually by The Recording Academy of the United States for outstanding achievements in the music industry. Often considered the highest music honor, the awards were established in 1958. Carnes has won two awards, from eight nominations.

Grammy Awards
Year	Work	Award	Result	Ref
1981	"Don't Fall in Love with a Dreamer" (with Kenny Rogers)	Best Pop Vocal Performance by a Duo, Group or Chorus	Nominated	
1982	Mistaken Identity	Album of the Year	Nominated	
1982	"Bette Davis Eyes"	Record of the Year	Won	
1982	"Bette Davis Eyes"	Best Pop Vocal Performance, Female	Nominated	
1983	Voyeur	Best Rock Vocal Performance, Female	Nominated	
1984	Flashdance: Original Soundtrack from the Motion Picture	Album of the Year	Nominated	
1984	Flashdance: Original Soundtrack from the Motion Picture	Best Album of Original Score Written for a Motion Picture or a Television Special	Won	
1984	"Invisible Hands"	Best Rock Vocal Performance, Female	Nominated	

- "Bette Davis Eyes" also won the Grammy Award for Song of the Year. This win is credited to songwriters Donna Weiss and Jackie DeShannon.
- "What About Me?" was nominated for the Grammy Award for Best Vocal Arrangement for Two or More Voices in 1984. The nomination is credited to arranger David Foster.
- Carnes was one of the various artists featured on the single "We Are the World", which won four Grammy Awards in 1986, including Record of the Year and Song of the Year.

=== Other awards ===
Award	Year	Recipient(s)	Category	Result	Ref.
Academy of Country Music Awards	1981	"Don't Fall in Love with a Dreamer"	Top Vocal Duet	Nominated	
American Music Awards	1981	"Don't Fall in Love with a Dreamer"	Favorite Country Single	Nominated	
American Music Awards	1982	"Bette Davis Eyes"	Favorite Pop/Rock Single	Nominated	
Juno Awards	1982	"Bette Davis Eyes"	International Single of the Year	Won	
TNN Music City News Country Awards	1994	"The Heart Won't Lie"	Single of the Year	Nominated	

== Discography ==
- Rest on Me (1971)
- Kim Carnes (1975)
- Sailin' (1976)
- St. Vincent's Court (1979)
- Romance Dance (1980)
- Mistaken Identity (1981)
- Voyeur (1982)
- Café Racers (1983)
- Barking at Airplanes (1985)
- Light House (1986)
- View from the House (1988)
- Checkin' Out the Ghosts (1991)
- Chasin' Wild Trains (2004)
