= MD 421 =

MD 421 may refer to:

- MD 421, a highway abbreviation, one of the List of former Maryland state highways (400–499)
- Sennheiser MD 421, a German microphone
