= A Bu =

Chinese jazz pianist (born 1999)

A Bu 阿布
- Born: Dai Liang; 1999 (age 26–27); Beijing, China
- Genre: Jazz
- Occupations: Pianist, composer
- Instrument: Piano
- Years active: 2012–present
- Label: Sennheiser

A Bu (Chinese: 阿布; born Dai Liang, 1999 in Beijing) is a Chinese jazz pianist and composer.

== Life ==
A Bu studied classical piano and jazz piano at the Central Conservatory of Music, Beijing at the age of nine and, from September 2014, at the Juilliard School in New York under Hung-Kuan Chen. After standing in for a performer at the 2012 Nine Gates festival, he was scouted by Sennheiser, later releasing multiple albums with their record label.

In 2013, he performed an unplanned improvisation with Chick Corea at the JZ Festival. In 2015 he won first place in the Parmigiana Jazz Solo Piano Competition at the Montreux Jazz Festival in Switzerland. Also in 2015, A Bu was invited by Unesco to play at the International Jazz Day All-Star Global Concert.

On November 21, 2016, he premiered Nikolai Kapustin's Nocturne in G major for piano and orchestra op. 16 in Moscow, accompanied by the Moscow Jazz Orchestra conducted by Igor Butman.

== Discography ==
- 88 Tones of Black and White; Sennheiser (Harmonia Mundi), 2014
- Butterflies Fly in Paris, with Tom Kennedy (Bass) and Ryan J. Lee (Drums); Sennheiser (Harmonia Mundi), 2016
- One Step East, with Larry Grenadier (Bass) and Eric Harland (Drums); Jz Music, 2021
