= Technische Universität Berlin =

Public university in Berlin, Germany

- Motto: Wir haben die Ideen für die Zukunft. Zum Nutzen der Gesellschaft.
- Motto in English: We've got the brains for the future. For the benefit of society.
- Type: Public
- Established: 1770; 256 years ago (Königliche Bergakademie zu Berlin); 1799 (Königliche Bauakademie zu Berlin); 1879 (Königlich Technische Hochschule zu Berlin / Technische Hochschule Charlottenburg); 1946 as Technische Universität Berlin
- Affiliations: TIME, TU9, EUA, CESAER, DFG, SEFI, PEGASUS, German Excellence Universities, Berlin University Alliance
- Budget: EUR 659.3 million (2022)
- President: Fatma Deniz (since 2026)
- Academic staff: 3,120
- Administrative staff: 2,258
- Students: 35,570
- Location: Berlin, Germany; 52°30′43″N 13°19′35″E
- Campus: Urban
- Website: tu.berlin

- Location within Germany Location within Berlin

Technische Universität Berlin (TU Berlin; also known as Technical University of Berlin, although officially the name should not be translated) is a public research university located in Berlin, Germany. It was the first German university to adopt the name Technische Universität (meaning 'university of technology').

The university alumni and staff includes several US National Academies members, two National Medal of Science laureates, the creator of the first fully functional programmable (electromechanical) computer, Konrad Zuse, and ten Nobel Prize laureates.

TU Berlin is a member of TU9, an incorporated society of the largest and most notable German institutes of technology and of the Top International Managers in Engineering network, which allows for student exchanges between leading engineering schools. It belongs to the Conference of European Schools for Advanced Engineering Education and Research. The TU Berlin is home of two innovation centers designated by the European Institute of Innovation and Technology. The university is labeled as "The Entrepreneurial University" (Die Gründerhochschule) by the Federal Ministry for Economic Affairs and Energy.

The university is notable for having been the first to offer a degree in Industrial Engineering and Management (Wirtschaftsingenieurwesen). The university designed the degree in response to requests by industrialists for graduates with the technical and management training to run a company. First offered in winter term 1926/27, it is one of the oldest programmes of its kind.

TU Berlin has one of the highest proportions of international students in Germany, almost 27% in 2019. In addition, TU Berlin is part of the Berlin University Alliance, has been conferred the title of "University of Excellence" under and receiving funding from the German Universities Excellence Initiative.

== History ==
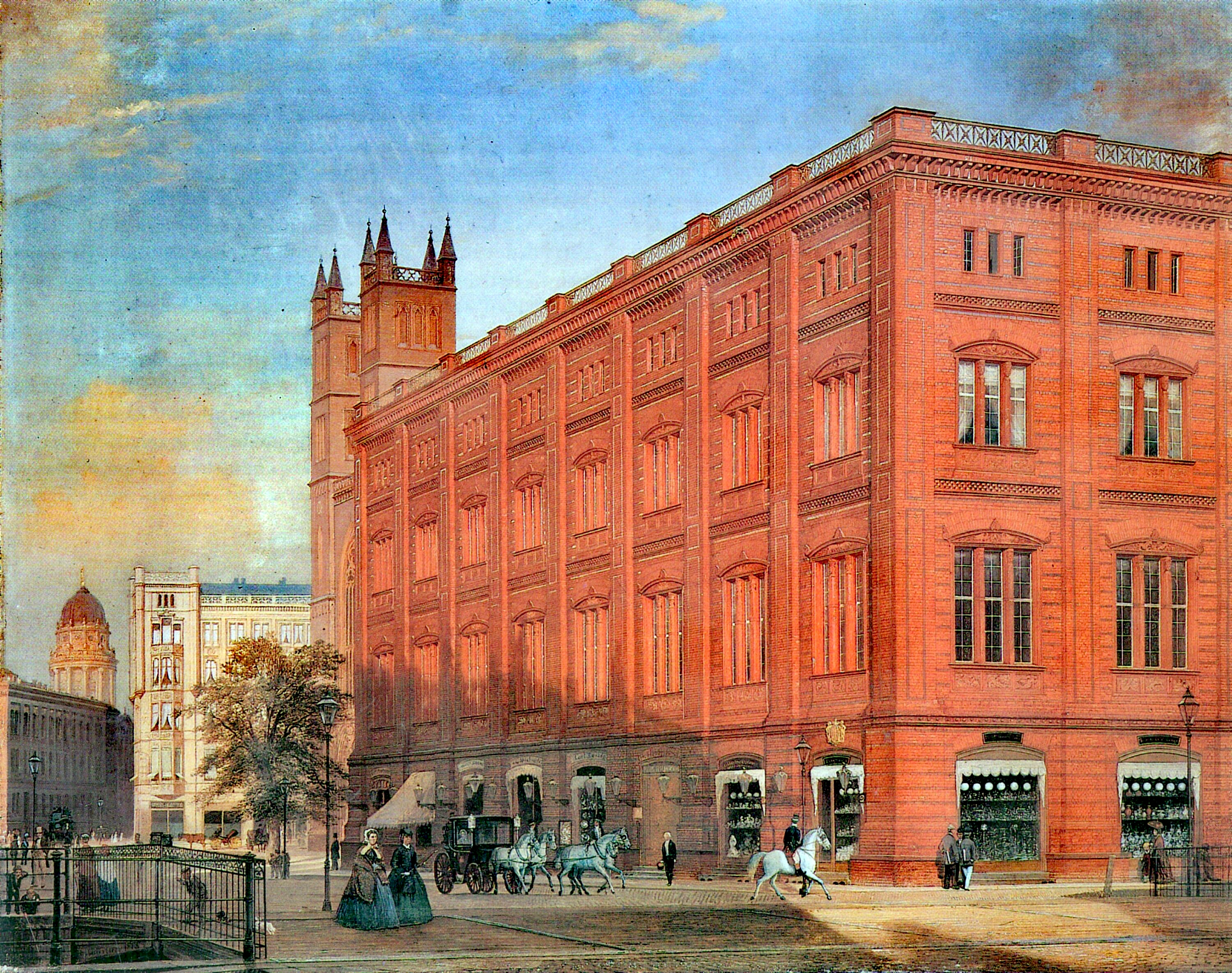
The Bauakademie, founded in 1799, a forerunner of the Technische Universität Berlin

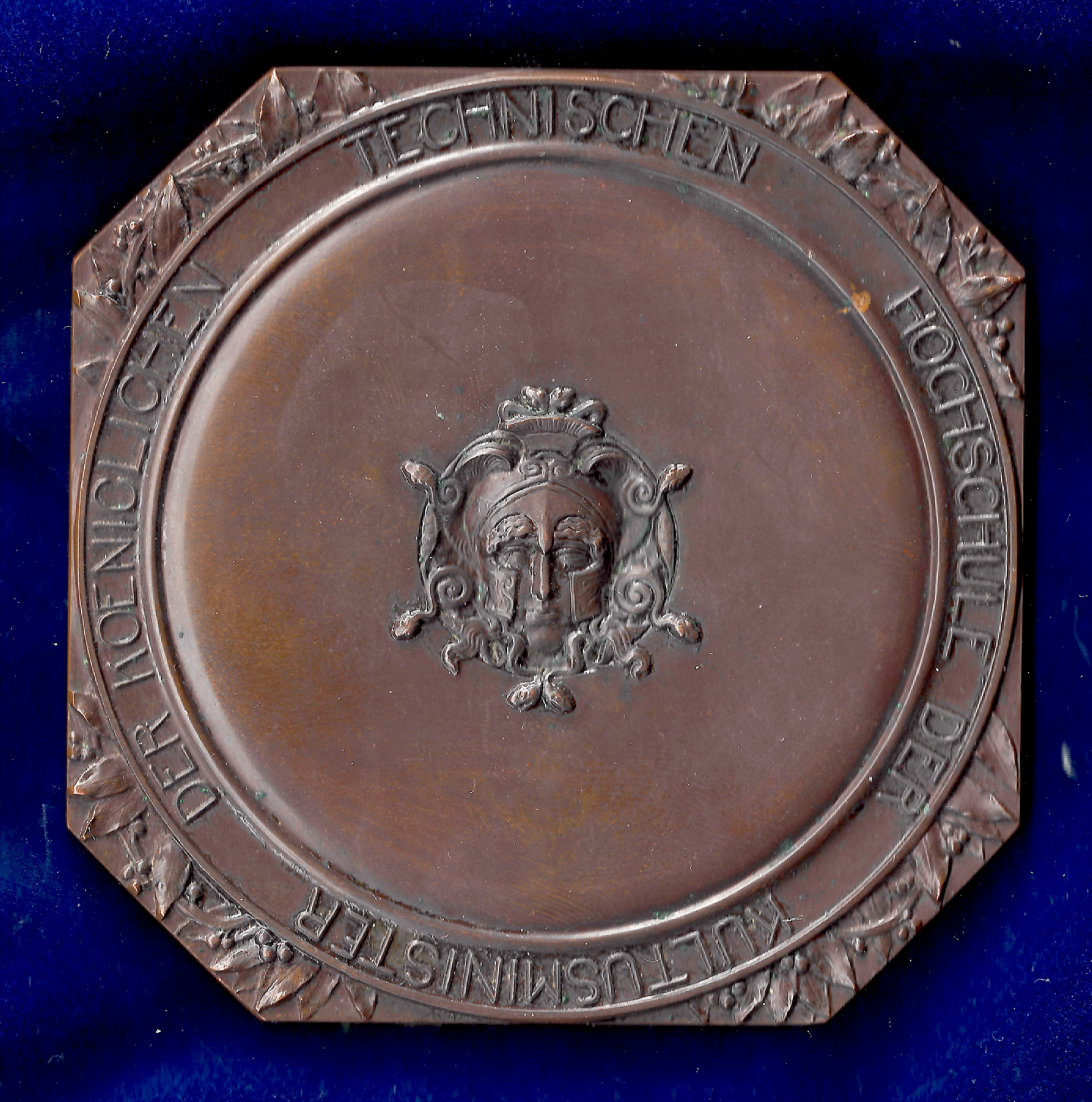
1899 early Art Nouveau Medal Technische Hochschule Berlin, 100th Anniversary, obverse

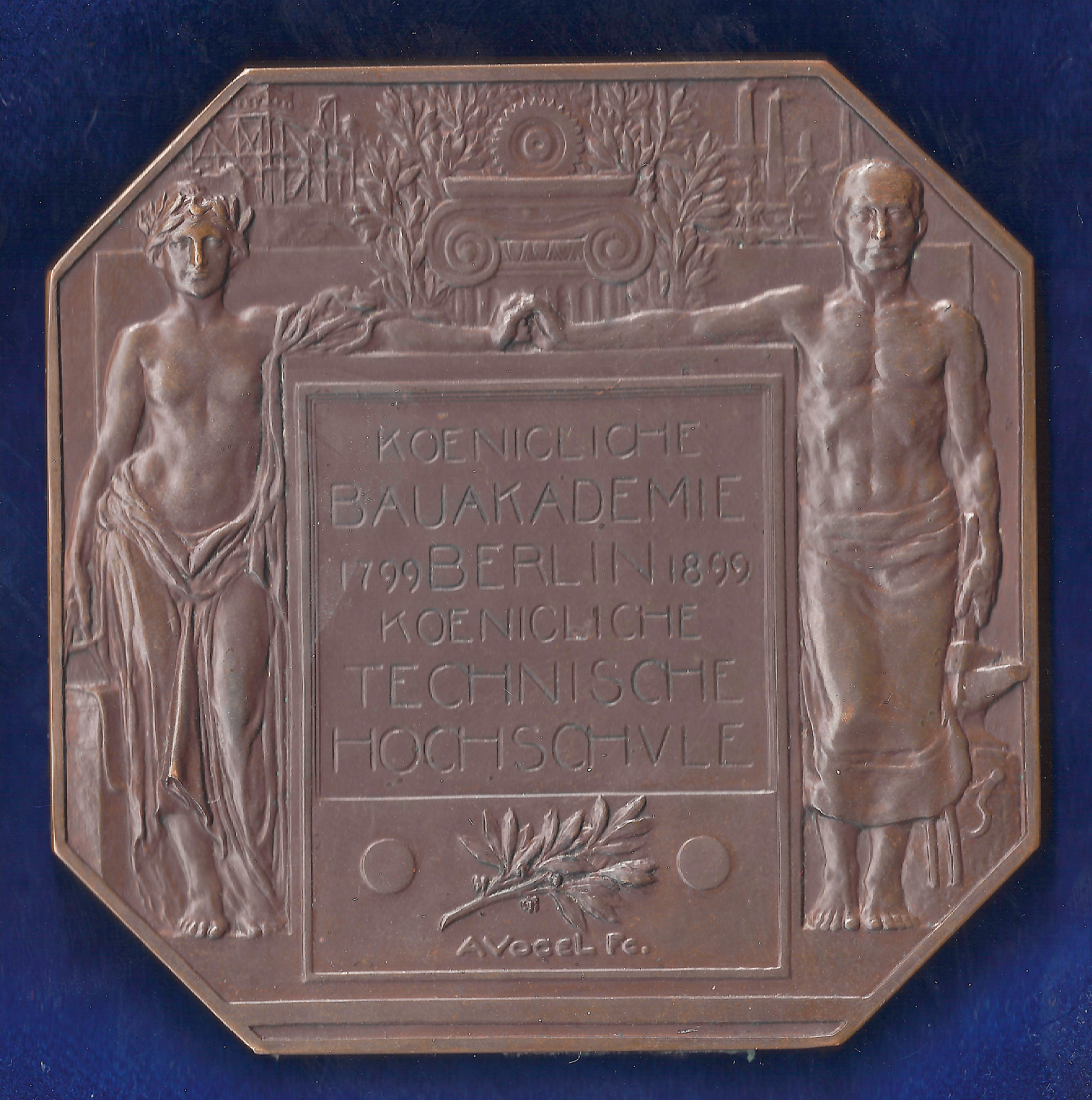
The reverse of this medal

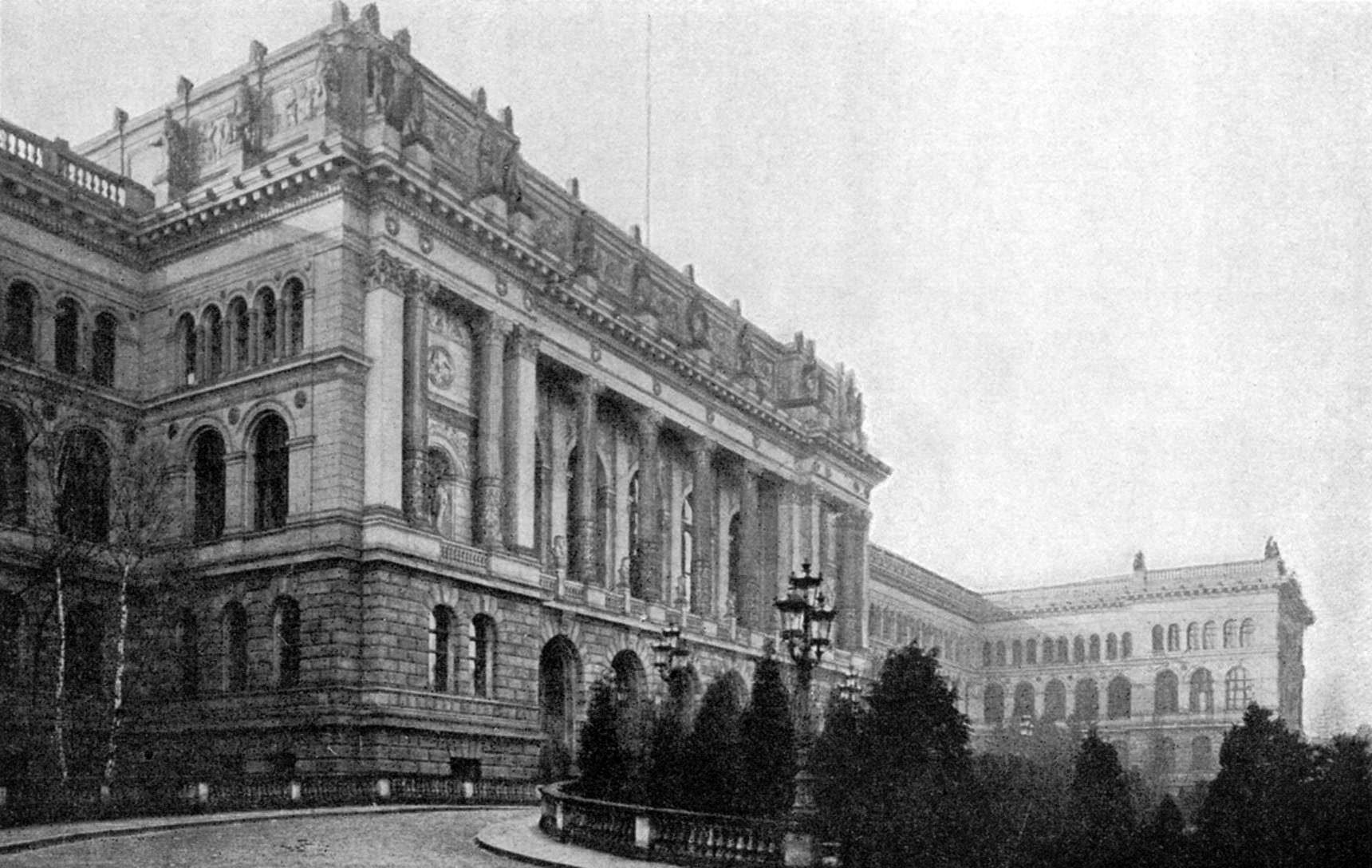
Northern front of the Königlich Technische Hochschule zu Berlin (Royal Technical Academy of Berlin) in 1895

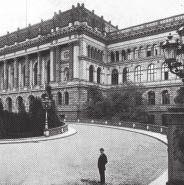
The Technische Hochschule in Charlottenburg, Berlin

On 1 April 1879, the Königlich Technische Hochschule zu Berlin ("Royal Technical Academy of Berlin") came into being through a merger of the Königliche Gewerbeakademie zu Berlin ("Royal Trade Academy", founded in 1827) and Königliche Bauakademie zu Berlin ("Royal Building Academy", founded in 1799), two predecessor institutions of the Prussian State.

In 1899, the Königlich Technische Hochschule zu Berlin was the first polytechnic in Germany to award doctorates, as a standard degree for the graduates, in addition to diplomas, thanks to professor Alois Riedler and Adolf Slaby, chairman of the Association of German Engineers (VDI) and the Association for Electrical, Electronic and Information Technologies (VDE).

In 1916 the long-standing Königliche Bergakademie zu Berlin, the Prussian mining academy created by the geologist Carl Abraham Gerhard in 1770 at the behest of King Frederick the Great, was incorporated into the Königlich Technische Hochschule as the "Department of Mining". Beforehand, the mining college had been, however, for several decades under the auspices of the Frederick William University (now Humboldt University of Berlin), before it was spun out again in 1860.

After Charlottenburg's absorption into Greater Berlin in 1920 and Germany becoming the Weimar Republic, the Königlich Technische Hochschule zu Berlin was renamed "Technische Hochschule zu Berlin" ("TH Berlin"). In 1927, the Department of Geodesy of the Agricultural College of Berlin was incorporated into the TH Berlin. During the 1930s, the redevelopment and expansion of the campus along the "East-West axis" were part of the Nazi plans of a Welthauptstadt Germania, including a new faculty of defense technology under General Karl Becker, built as a part of the greater academic town (Hochschulstadt) in the adjacent west-wise Grunewald forest. The shell construction remained unfinished after the outbreak of World War II and after Becker's suicide in 1940, it is today covered by the large-scale Teufelsberg rubble hill.

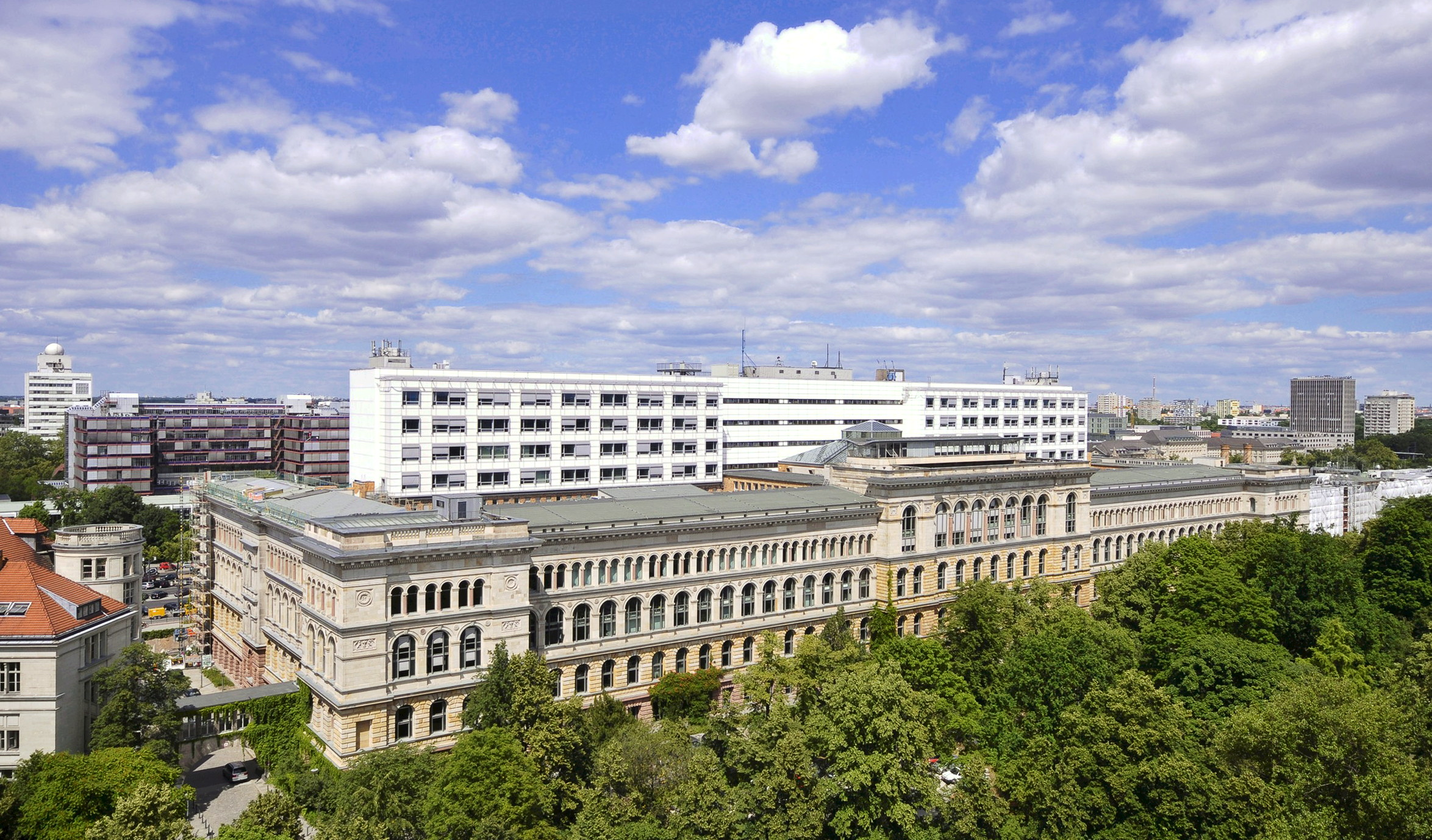
Main building of TU Berlin in 2010

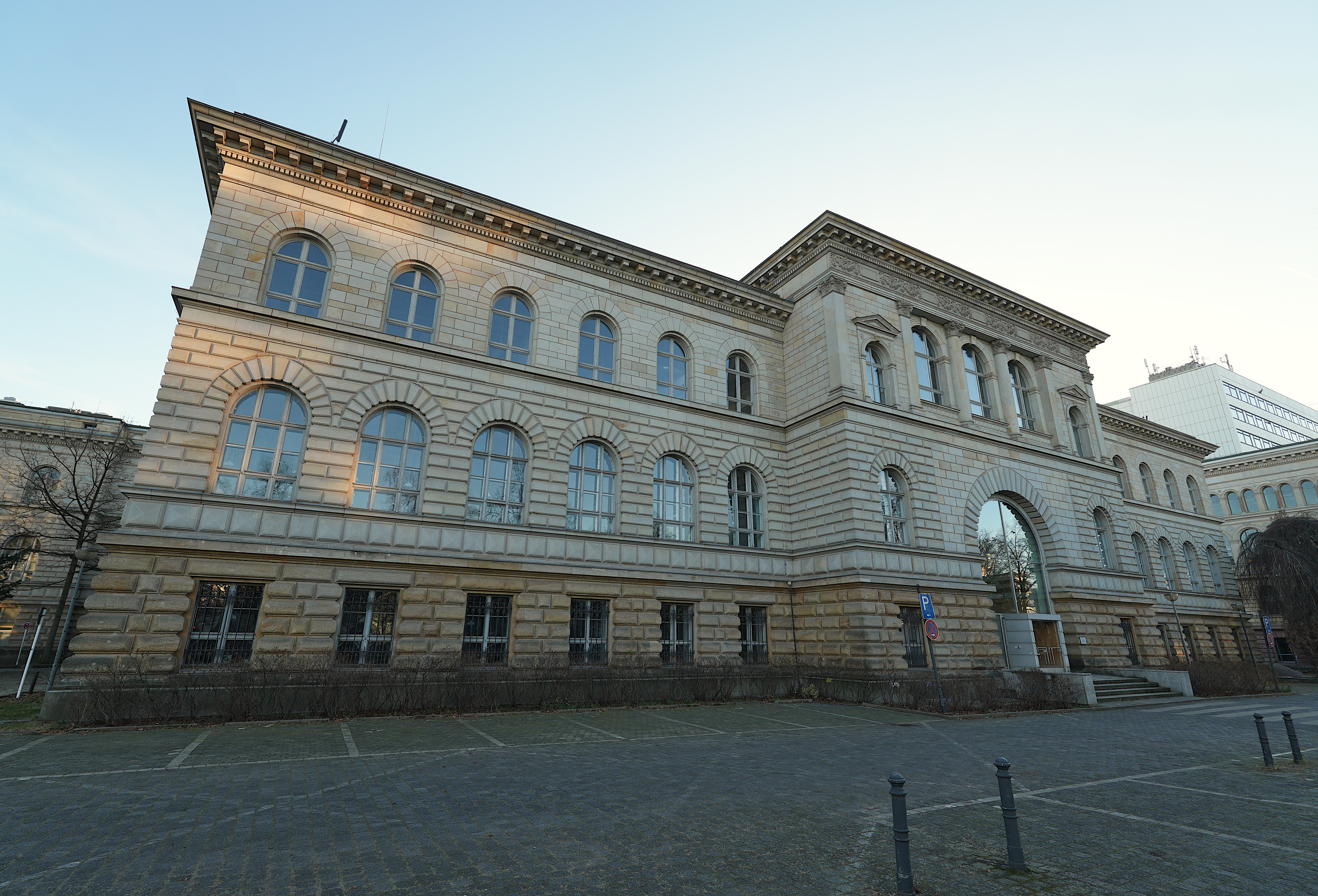
Chemistry building in 2025

The north section of the main building of the university was destroyed during a bombing raid in November 1943. Due to the street fighting at the end of the Second World War, the operations at the TH Berlin were suspended as of 20 April 1945. Planning for the re-opening of the school began on 2 June 1945, once the acting rectorship led by Gustav Ludwig Hertz and Max Volmer was appointed. As both Hertz and Volmer remained in exile in the Soviet Union for some time to come, the college was not re-inaugurated until 9 April 1946, now bearing the name "Technische Universität Berlin".

Since 2009 the TU Berlin has housed two Knowledge and Innovation Communities (KIC) designated by the European Institute of Innovation and Technology.

== Name ==
The official policy of the university is that only the German name, Technische Universität Berlin (TU Berlin), should be used abroad in order to promote corporate identity and that its name is not to be translated into English.

== Campus ==
The TU Berlin covers 604,000 square metres (6.5 million square feet), distributed over various locations in Berlin. The main campus is located in the borough of Charlottenburg-Wilmersdorf. The seven schools of the university have some 33,933 students enrolled in 90 subjects (October 2015).

From 2012 to 2022, TU Berlin operated a satellite campus in Egypt, the El Gouna campus, to act as a scientific and academic field office. The nonprofit public–private partnership (PPP) aimed to offer services provided by Technische Universität Berlin at the campus in El Gouna on the Red Sea.

The university also has a franchise of its Global Production Engineering course – called Global Production Engineering and Management at the Vietnamese-German University in Ho Chi Minh City.

== Organization ==
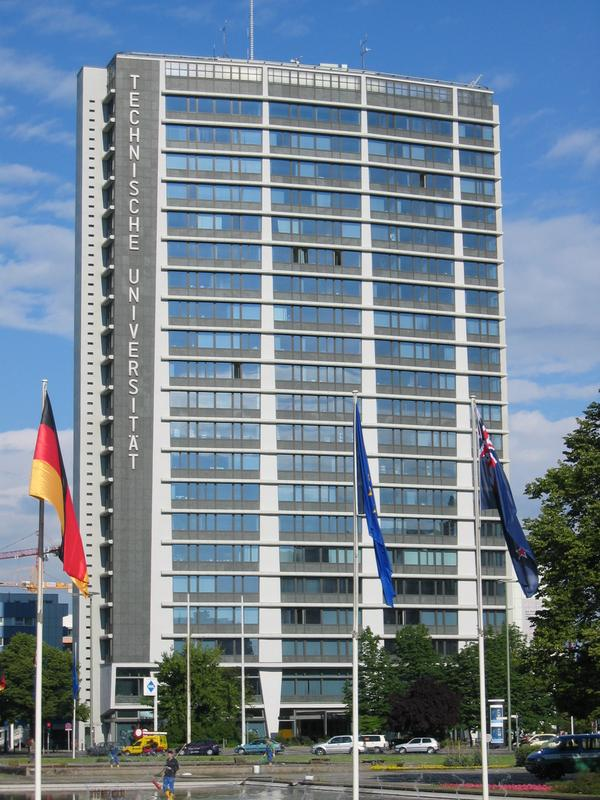
Telefunken-Highrise, the tallest building on campus

Since 2002, the TU Berlin has consisted of the following faculties and institutes:

- Faculty I – Humanities and Educational Sciences (Geistes- und Bildungswissenschaften)
  - Institute of History and Philosophy of Science, Technology, and Literature
  - Institute for Art History and Historical Urbanism
  - Institute of Education
  - Institute of Language and Communication
  - Institute of Vocational Education and Work Studies
  - Center for Research on Antisemitism (ZfA)
  - Center for Interdisciplinary Women's and Gender Studies (ZIFG)
  - Center for Cultural Studies on Science and Technology in China (CCST)
- Faculty II – Mathematics and Natural Sciences (Mathematik und Naturwissenschaften)
  - Center for Astronomy and Astrophysics
  - Institute of Chemistry
  - Institute of Solid-State Physics
  - Institute of Mathematics
  - Institute of Optics and Atomic Physics
  - Institute of Theoretical Physics
- Faculty III – Process Sciences (Prozesswissenschaften)
  - Institute of Biotechnology
  - Institute of Energy Technology
  - Institute of Food Technology and Food Chemistry
  - Institute of Chemical and Process Engineering
  - Institute of Environmental Technology
  - Institute of Material Sciences and Technology
- Faculty IV – Electrical Engineering and Computer Science (Elektrotechnik und Informatik)
  - Institute of Energy and Automation Technology
  - Institute of High-Frequency and Semiconductor System Technologies
  - Institute of Telecommunication Systems
  - Institute of Computer Engineering and Microelectronics
  - Institute of Software Engineering and Theoretical Computer Science
  - Institute of Commercial Information Technology and Quantitative Methods
- Faculty V – Mechanical Engineering and Transport Systems (Verkehrs- und Maschinensysteme)
  - Institute of Fluid Mechanics and Technical Acoustics
  - Institute of Psychology and Ergonomics (Arbeitswissenschaft)
  - Institute of Land and Sea Transport Systems
  - Institute of Aeronautics and Astronautics
  - Institute of Engineering Design, and Micro and Medical Technology
  - Institute of Machine Tools and Factory Management
  - Institute of Mechanics
- Faculty VI – Planning Building Environment (Planen Bauen Umwelt)
  - Institute of Architecture
  - Institute of Civil Engineering
  - Institute of Applied Geosciences
  - Institute of Geodesy and Geoinformation Science
  - Institute of Landscape Architecture and Environmental Planning
  - Institute of Ecology
  - Institute of Sociology
  - Institute of Urban and Regional Planning
- Faculty VII – Economics and Management (Wirtschaft und Management)
  - Institute for Technology and Management (ITM)
  - Institute of Business Administration (IBWL)
  - Institute of Economics and Law (IVWR)
- School of Education (SETUB)
- Central Institute El Gouna (Zentralinstitut El Gouna)

== Faculty and staff ==
As of 2015, 8,455 people work at the university: 338 professors, 2,598 postgraduate researchers, and 2,131 personnel work in administration, the workshops, the library, and the central facilities. In addition, there are 2,651 student assistants and 126 trainees. International student mobility is available through the ERASMUS programme or through the Top Industrial Managers for Europe (TIME) network.

== Library ==
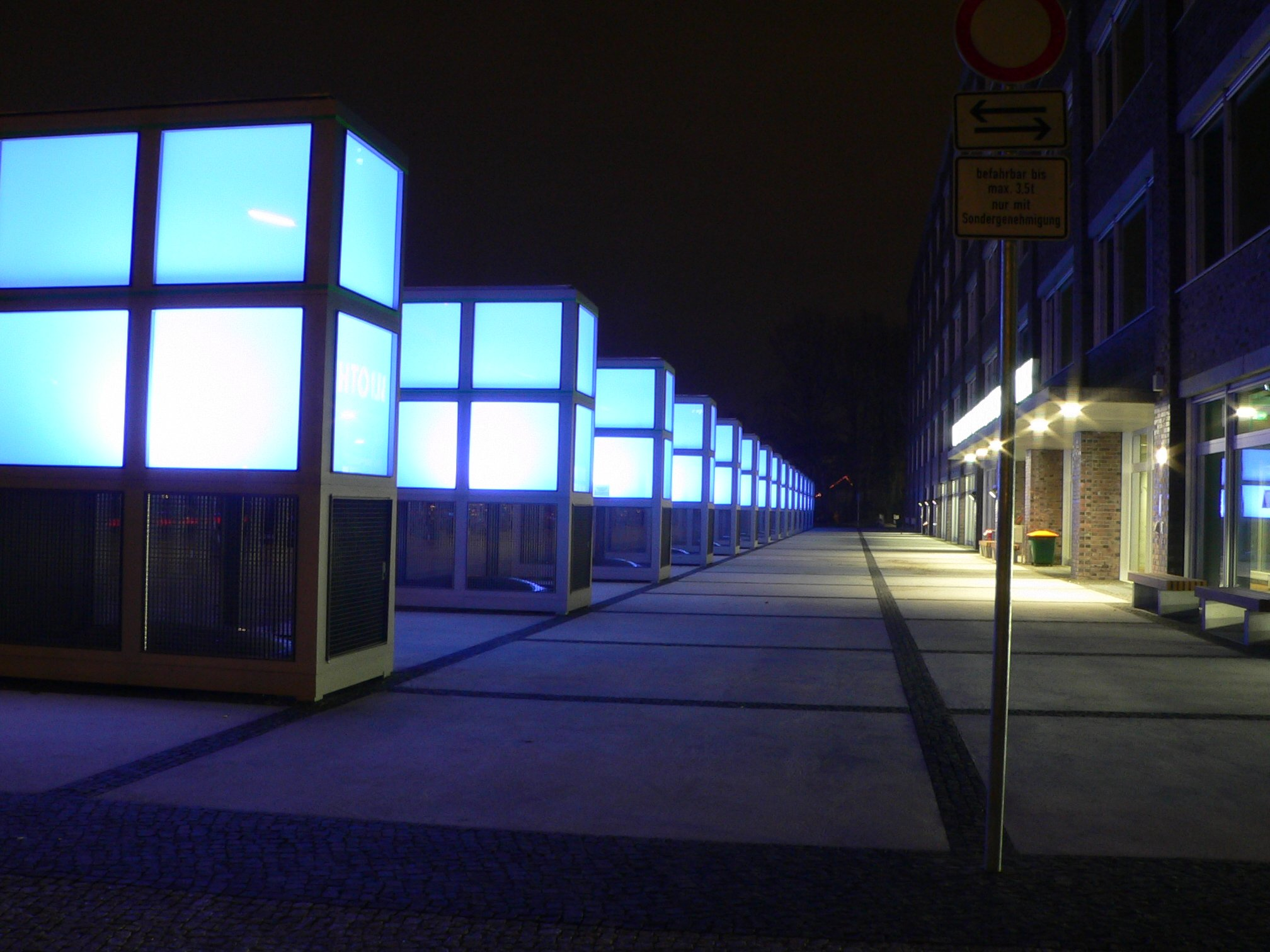
Entrance of the main library of Technische Universität Berlin and of the Berlin University of the Arts

The new common main library of Technische Universität Berlin and of the Berlin University of the Arts was opened in 2004 and holds about 2.9 million volumes (2007). The library building was sponsored partially (estimated 10% of the building costs) by Volkswagen and is named officially "University Library of the TU Berlin and UdK (in the Volkswagen building)".

Some of the former 17 libraries of Technische Universität Berlin and of the nearby University of the Arts were merged into the new library, but several departments still retain libraries of their own. In particular, the school of 'Economics and Management' maintains a library with 340,000 volumes in the university's main building (Die Bibliothek – Wirtschaft & Management/"The Library" – Economics and Management) and the 'Department of Mathematics' maintains a library with 60,000 volumes in the Mathematics building (Mathematische Fachbibliothek/"Mathematics Library").

== Notable alumni and professors ==
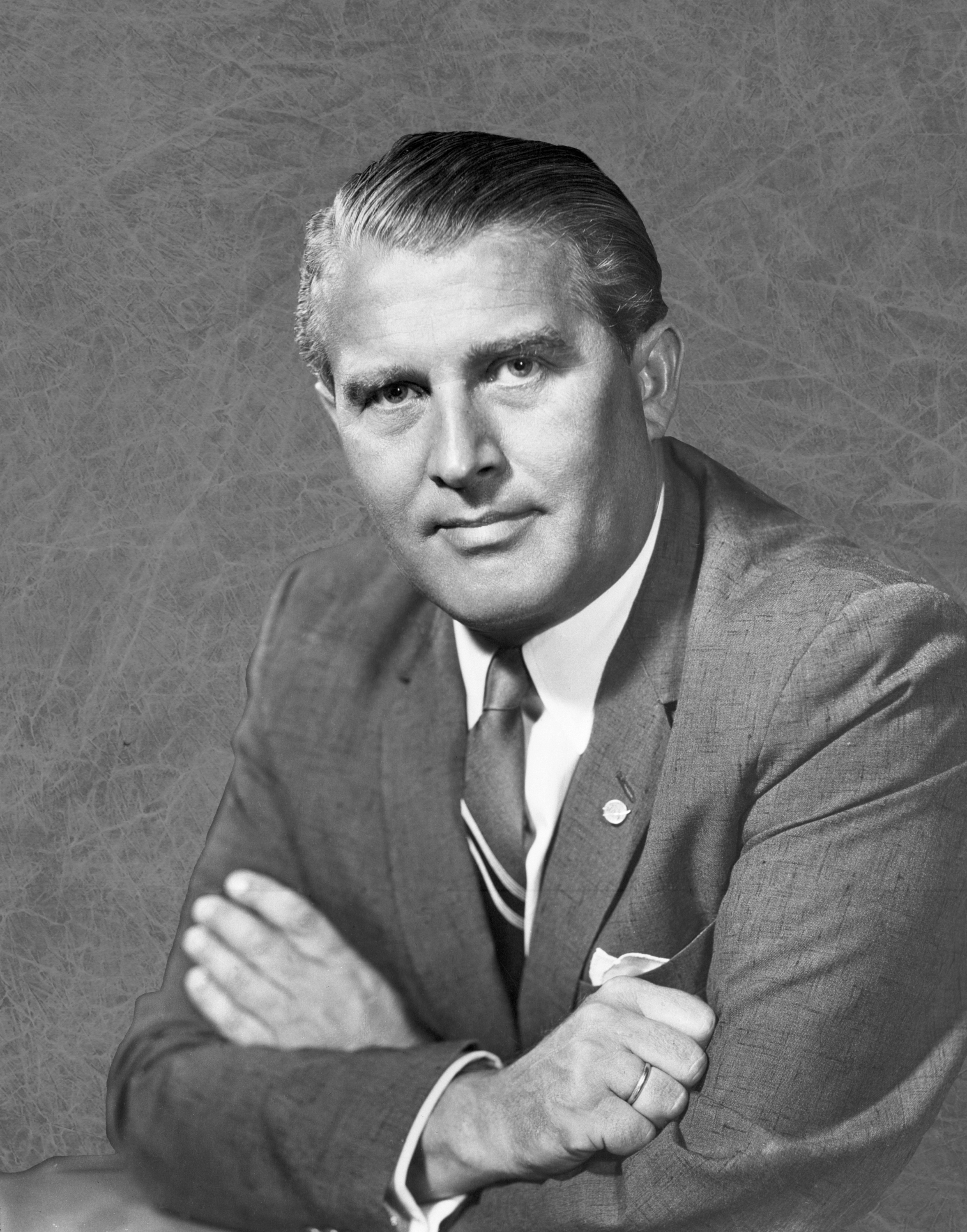
Wernher von Braun (1912–1977), engineer, designer of the first ballistic missile and NASA rockets

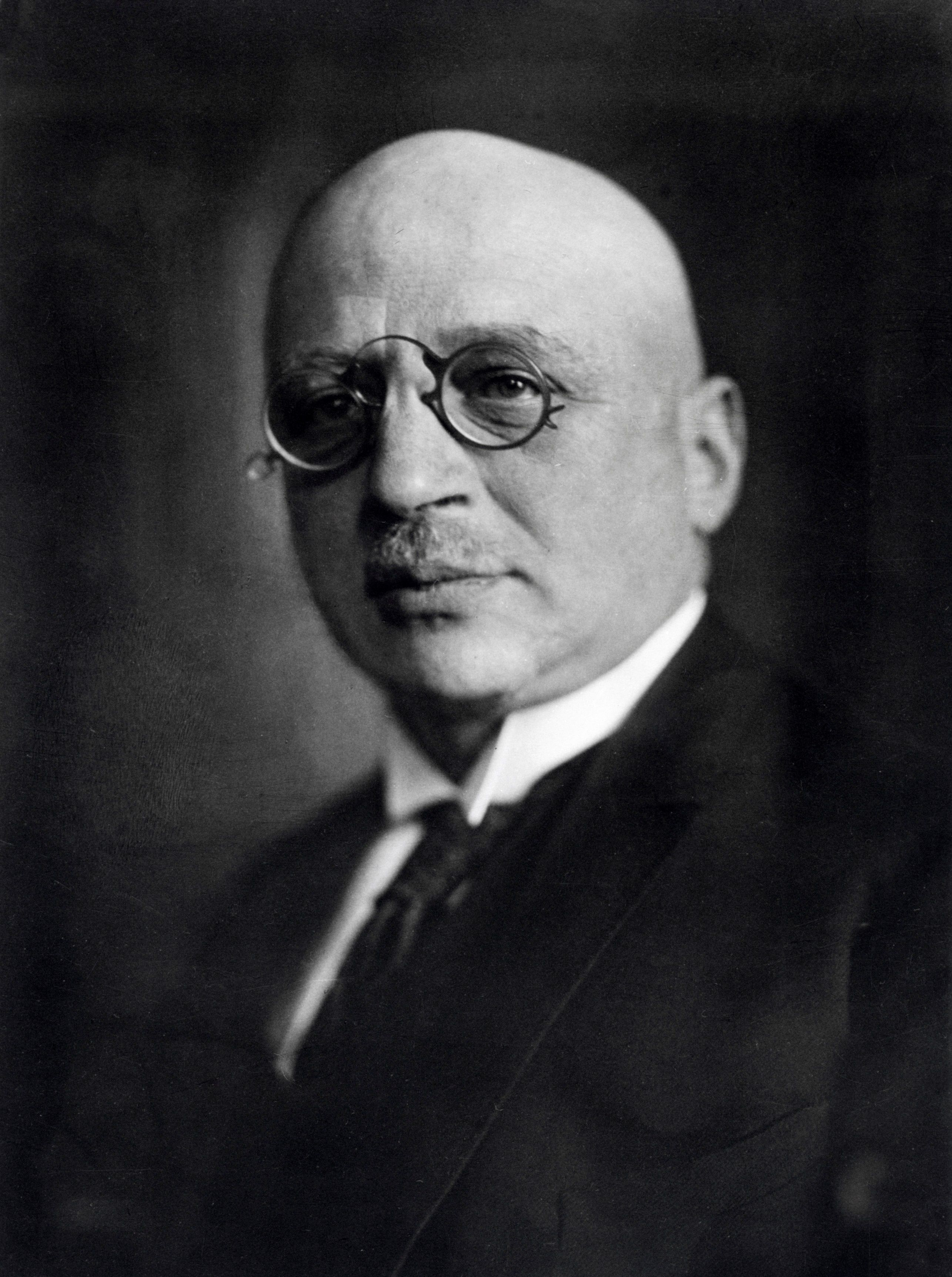
Fritz Haber, Nobel Prize in Chemistry, 1918

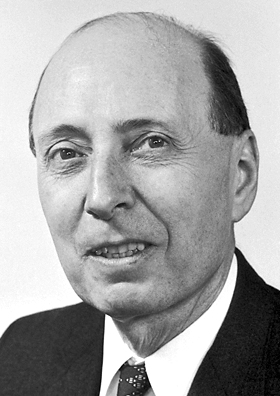
Eugene Paul Wigner (1902–1995), Nobel Prize in Physics, 1963

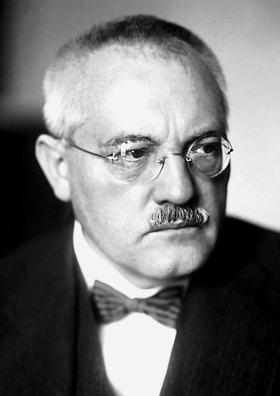
Carl Bosch (1874–1940), Nobel Prize in Chemistry, 1931

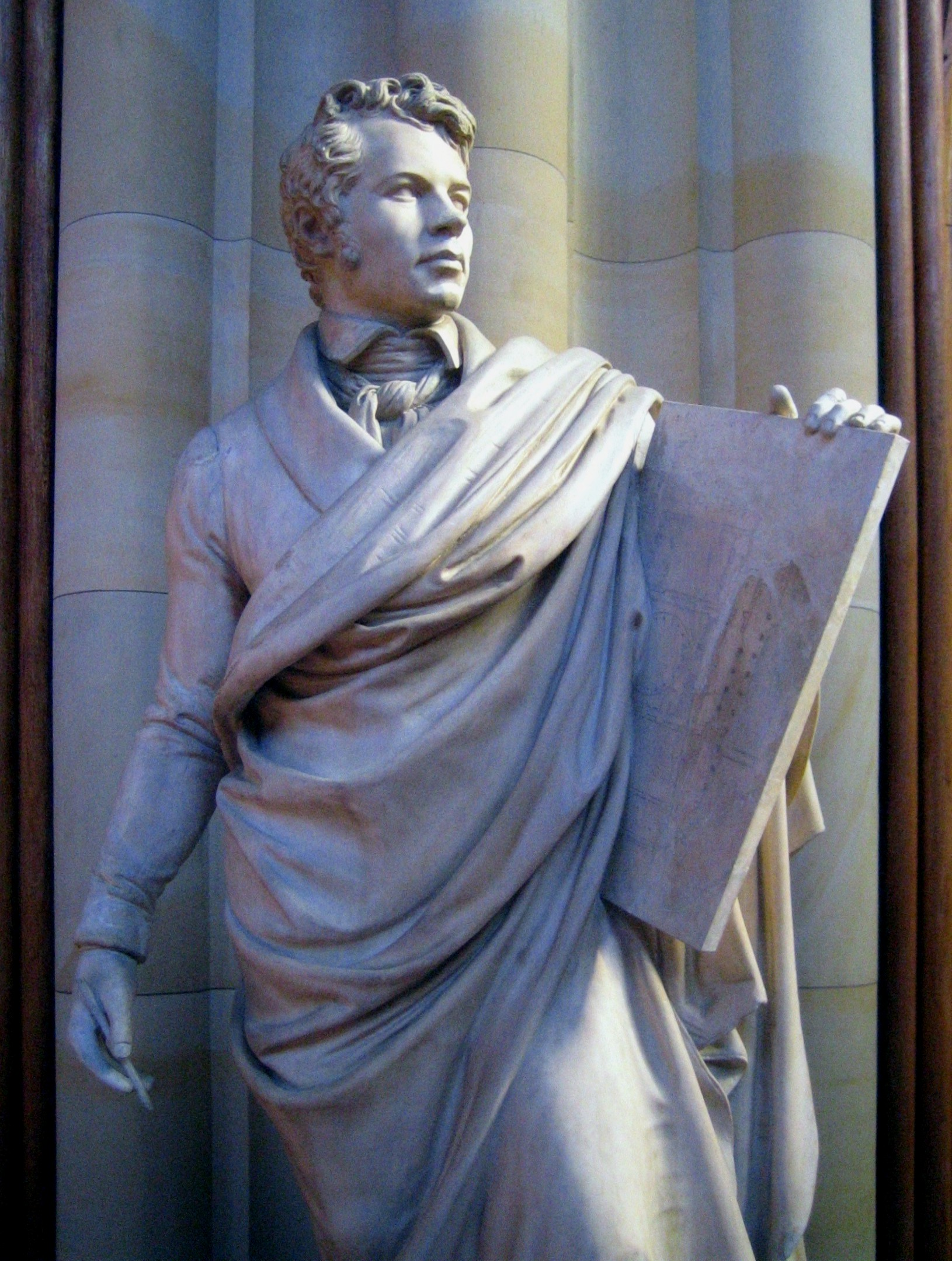
Karl Friedrich Schinkel (1781–1841), graduate of the Bauakademie, architect

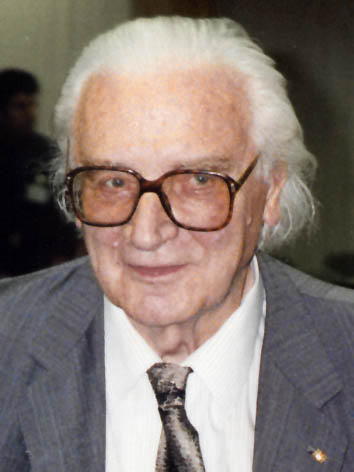
Konrad Zuse (1910–1995), designed the first modern computer and first high-level programming language

(Including those of the Academies mentioned in the History section)

- Bruno Ahrends (1878–1948), architect
- Steffen Ahrends (1907–1992), architect
- Zora Arkus-Duntov (1909–1996), Russian and American engineer and racing car driver
- Stancho Belkovski (1891–1962), Bulgarian architect, head of the Higher Technical School in Sofia and the department of public buildings.
- August Borsig (1804–1854), businessman
- Carl Bosch (1874–1940), chemist, Nobel Prize winner 1931
- Franz Breisig (1868–1934), mathematician, inventor of the calibration wire and father of the term "quadripole network" in electrical engineering.
- Wilhelm Cauer (1900–1945), mathematician, made contributions to the design of filters.
- Henri Marie Coandă (1886–1972), Romanian aircraft designer; discovered the Coandă Effect.
- Lotte Cohn (1893-1983), German-Israeli architect
- Jan Czochralski (1885–1953), Polish chemist
- Carl Dahlhaus (1928–1989), musicologist
- Kurt Daluege (1897–1946), SS official, chief of Ordnungspolizei (Order Police) of Nazi Germany from 1936 to 1943, hanged as a war criminal
- Walter Dornberger (1895–1980), Major-General, developer of the Air Force-NASA X-20 Dyna-Soar project.
- Ottmar Edenhofer (born 1961), economist
- Krafft Arnold Ehricke (1917–1984), rocket-propulsion engineer, worked for the NASA, chief designer of the Centaur
- Gerhard Ertl (born 10 October 1936 in Stuttgart), physicist and surface chemist, Hon. Prof. and Nobel Prize winner 2007
- Ladislaus Farkas (1904–1948), Austro-Hungarian/Israeli chemist
- Gottfried Feder (1883–1941), economist and key member of the National Socialist Party
- Wigbert Fehse (born 1937) German engineer and researcher in the area of automatic space navigation, guidance, control, and docking/berthing.
- Ursula Franklin (1921–2016), Canadian physicist (archaeometry) and theorist on the political and social effects of technology, Pearson Medal of Peace winner 2001
- Dennis Gabor (1900–1971), Hungarian-British physicist (holography), Nobel Prize winner 1971
- Hans Geiger (1882–1945), physicist, co-inventor of the detector component of the Geiger counter
- Elsa Gidoni (1901–1978), German-American architect and interior designer.
- Thomas Gil (born 1954), Professor of Practical Philosophy.
- Heinrich Nordhoff (1899-1968) First Volkswagen CEO
- Fritz Gosslau (1898–1965), German engineer, known for his work at the V-1 flying bomb.
- Fritz Haber (1868–1934), chemist who received the Nobel Prize in Chemistry in 1918
- Gustav Ludwig Hertz (1887–1975), physicist, Nobel Prize winner 1925
- Ernst Herzfeld (1879–1948), archaeologist and Iranologist
- Franz Hillinger (1895–1973), architect of the Neues Bauen (New Objectivity) movement in Berlin and in Turkey.
- Fritz Houtermans (1903–1966) Dutch-Austrian-German atomic and nuclear physicist
- Hugo Junkers (1859–1935), former of Junkers & Co, a major German aircraft manufacturer.
- Anatol Kagan (1913–2009), Russian-born Australian architect.
- Helmut Kallmeyer (1910–2006), chemist and Action T4 perpetrator
- Walter Kaufmann (1871–1947), physicist, well known for his first experimental proof of the velocity dependence of mass.
- Diébédo Francis Kéré (born 1965), Burnikabe architect
- Nicolas Kitsikis (1887–1978), Greek civil engineer, rector of the Athens Polytechnic School, senator and member of the Greek Parliament, doctor honoris causa of the Technische Universität Berlin.
- Heinz-Hermann Koelle (born 1925) former director of the Army Ballistic Missile Agency, member of the launch crew on Explorer I and later directed the NASA's Marshall Space Flight Center's involvement in Project Apollo.
- Abdul Qadeer Khan (born 1936), Pakistani nuclear physicist and metallurgical engineer, who founded the uranium enrichment program for Pakistan's atomic bomb project.
- Arthur Korn (1870–1945), physicist, mathematician, and inventor of the fax machine.
- Franz Kruckenberg (1882–1965), designer of the first aerodynamic high-speed train 1931
- Karl Küpfmüller (1897–1977), electrical engineer, essential contributions to system theory
- Konrad Kwiet (born 1941), historian and scholar of the Holocaust.
- Edward Lasker (1885–1981), German-American chess player
- Wassili Luckhardt (1889–1972), architect
- Georg Hans Madelung (1889–1972), academic and aeronautical engineer.
- Herbert Franz Mataré (1912–2011), physicist and Transistor-pioneer
- Alexander Meissner (1883–1958), Austrian electrical engineer
- Otto Metzger, German-British engineer
- Joachim Milberg (born 1943), Former CEO of BMW AG.
- Erwin Wilhelm Müller (1911–1977), physicist (field emission microscope, field ion microscope, atom probe)
- Klaus-Robert Müller (born 1964), computer scientist and physicist, a leading researcher in machine learning
- Hans-Georg Münzberg (1916–2000), engineer, airplane turbines
- Jakob Nagel (1899–1973), electrical engineer and civil servant, state secretary in the Reich Postal Ministry
- Gustav Niemann (1899–1982), mechanical engineer
- Ida Noddack (1896–1978), nominated three times for Nobel Prize in Chemistry.
- Egon Orowan (1902–1989), Hungarian-British physicist, metallurgist, and academic
- Jakob Karol Parnas (1884–1949), Polish-Soviet biochemist, Embden-Meyerhof-Parnas pathway
- Wolfgang Paul (1913–1993), physicist, Nobel Prize winner 1989
- Roland Posner (1942–2020), semiotician
- Hans Reissner (1874–1967), aeronautical engineer whose avocation was mathematical physics
- Franz Reuleaux (1829–1905), mechanical engineer, often called the father of kinematics
- Klaus Riedel (1907–1944), German rocket pioneer, worked on the V-2 missile programme at Peenemünde.
- Alois Riedler (1850–1936), Austrian inventor of the Leavitt-Riedler Pumping Engine; proponent of practically oriented engineering education.
- Hermann Rietschel (1847–1914), inventor of modern HVAC (heating, ventilation, and air conditioning).
- Arthur Rudolph (1906–1996) worked for the U.S. Army and NASA, developer of Pershing missile and the Saturn V Moon rocket.
- Ernst Ruska (1906–1988), physicist (electron microscope), Nobel Prize winner 1986
- Karl Friedrich Schinkel (1781–1841), architect (at the predecessor Berlin Building Academy)
- Bernhard Schölkopf (born 1968), computer scientist
- Fritz Sennheiser (1912–2010), founder of Sennheiser
- Adolf Slaby (1849–1913), German Wireless pioneer
- Albert Speer (1905–1981), architect, politician, Minister for Armaments during the Third Reich, was sentenced to 20 years prison in the Nuremberg trials
- Ernst Steinitz (1871–1928), mathematician.
- Edmund Stinnes (1896–1980), German-American industrialist, professor, and heir
- Ivan Stranski (1897–1979), Bulgarian chemist, considered the father of crystal growth research
- Zdenko Strižić (1902–1990), Croatian architect
- Ernst Stuhlinger (1913–2008), German-American member of the Army Ballistic Missile Agency, director of the space science lab at NASA's Marshall Space Flight Center.
- Kurt Tank (1893–1983), head of design department of Focke-Wulf, designed the Fw 190
- Willibald Trinks (1874–1966), head of the Department of Mechanical of Engineering of the Carnegie Institute of Technology
- Hermann W. Vogel, (1834–1898) photo-chemist
- Wernher von Braun (1912–1977), German-American head of Nazi Germany's V-2 rocket program, saved from prosecution at the Nuremberg Trials by Operation Paperclip, first director of the United States National Aeronautics and Space Administration's (NASA) Marshall Space Flight Center, called the father of the U.S. space program.
- Elisabeth von Knobelsdorff (1877–1959), engineer and architect
- Julius Weingarten (1836–1910), mathematician, contributed to the differential geometry of surfaces
- Chaim Weizmann (1874-1952), first president of Israel
- Wilhelm Heinrich Westphal (1882–1978), physicist
- Eugene Wigner (1902–1995), Hungarian-American physicist, discovered the Wigner-Ville-distribution, Nobel Prize winner 1963
- Ludwig Wittgenstein (1889–1951), Austrian philosopher
- Martin C. Wittig (born 1964), Former CEO of the management consultant firm Roland Berger Strategy Consultants.
- Constantin Zablovschi (1882–1967), Romanian pioneer radio engineer in Romania
- Elisa Leonida Zamfirescu (1887–1973) chemist, graduated 1912, female engineering pioneer.
- Günter M. Ziegler (born 1963), Gottfried Wilhelm Leibniz Prize (2001)
- Konrad Zuse (1910–1995), computer pioneer
- Thomas Dohmke (born 1978), software developer and former CEO of GitHub

== Rankings ==
University rankings

Overall – Global & National
QS World 2025	=147	8
THE World 2024	=136	12–13
ARWU World 2023	201–300	10–19

According to the QS World University Rankings 2025, TU Berlin was ranked 147th globally, making it the 8th best university in the country. In the Times Higher Education World University Rankings for 2023, the institution was ranked 136th globally and within the 12–13th range nationally. The Academic Ranking of World Universities for 2023 positions TU Berlin within the 201–300 range globally and the 10–19 range within Germany.

Measured by the number of top managers in the German economy, TU Berlin ranked 11th in 2019.

According to the research report of the German Research Foundation (DFG) from 2018, TU Berlin ranked 24th absolute among German universities across all scientific disciplines. Thereby TU Berlin ranked 9th absolute in natural sciences and engineering. The TU Berlin took 14th place absolute in computer science and 5th place absolute in electrical engineering. In a competitive selection process, the DFG selects the best research projects from researchers at universities and research institutes and finances them. The ranking is thus regarded as an indicator of the quality of research.

In the 2017 Times Higher Education World University Rankings, the TU Berlin ranked 40th in the field of Engineering & Technology (3rd in Germany) and 36th in Computer science discipline (4th in Germany), making it one of the top 100 universities worldwide in all three measures.

As of 2016, TU Berlin was ranked 35th in the field of Engineering & Technology according to the British QS World University Rankings. It was one of Germany's highest ranked universities in statistics and operations research and in Mathematics according to QS.

== See also ==
- Universities and research institutions in Berlin
- European Institute of Innovation and Technology
- Free University of Berlin
- Humboldt University of Berlin
- Berlin University of the Arts
