= Sennheiser MD 441 =

German dynamic microphone

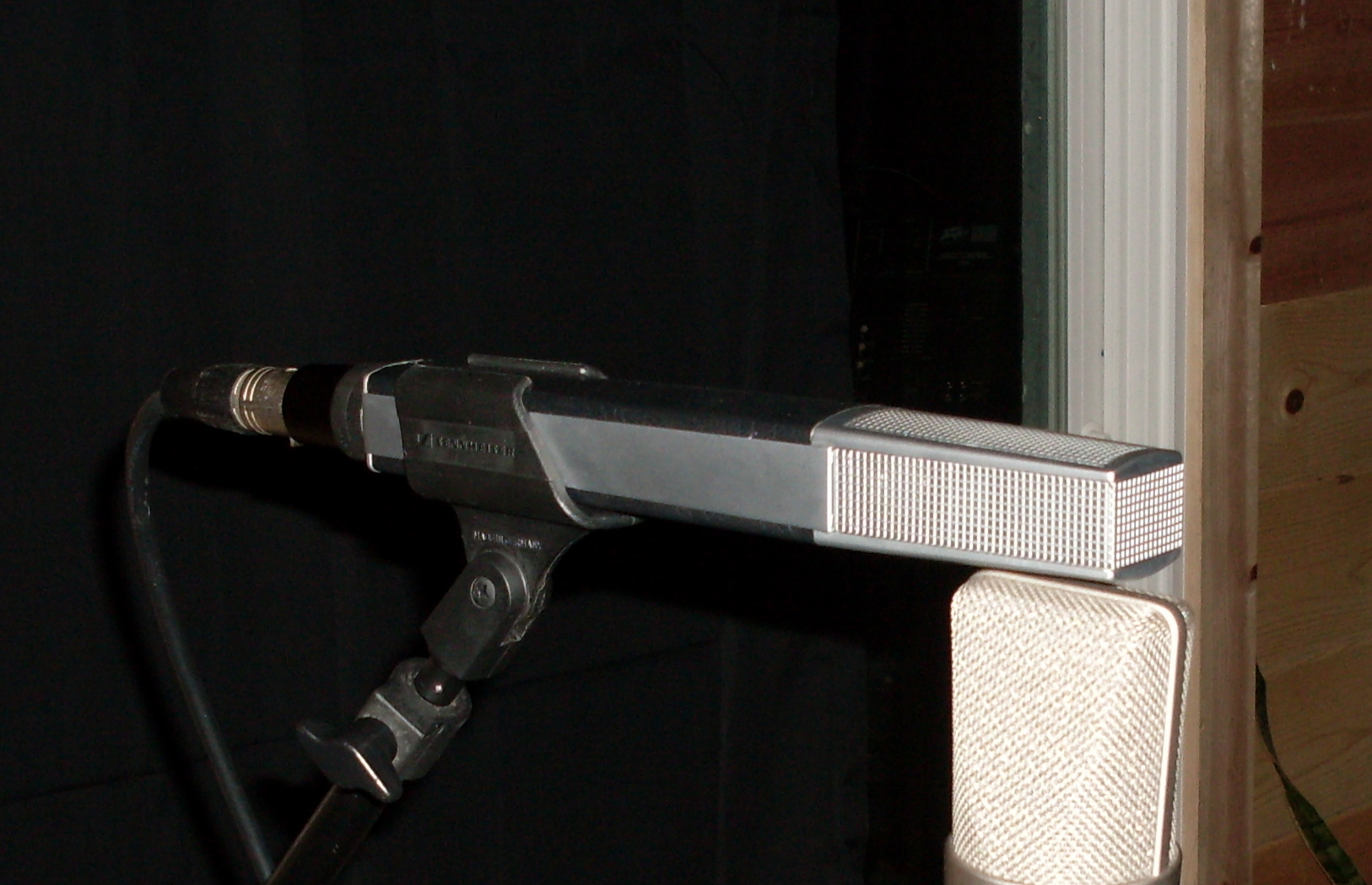
Sennheiser MD 441

The Sennheiser MD 441 is a large-diaphragm dynamic microphone introduced by Sennheiser in 1971. Following the introduction of the MD 21 in 1953 and the Sennheiser MD 421 in 1960, the MD 441 was widely-used for radio and television reporting and was often seen as part of political appearances around the world.

== Features ==
The MD 441 has a supercardioid polar pattern, with a frequency response of 30 to 20,000 Hertz, sensitivity of 1.8 mV/Pa ±2 dB, and Impedance of 200 Ohms. It also features a hum compensation coil. Like the MD 421, the MD 441 has a five-stage bass switch. While it was originally introduced with a DIN connector, it has featured an XLR connector since 1985. Available in various versions and colors over the years, the current model is silver.

== Usage ==
=== Broadcast and film ===
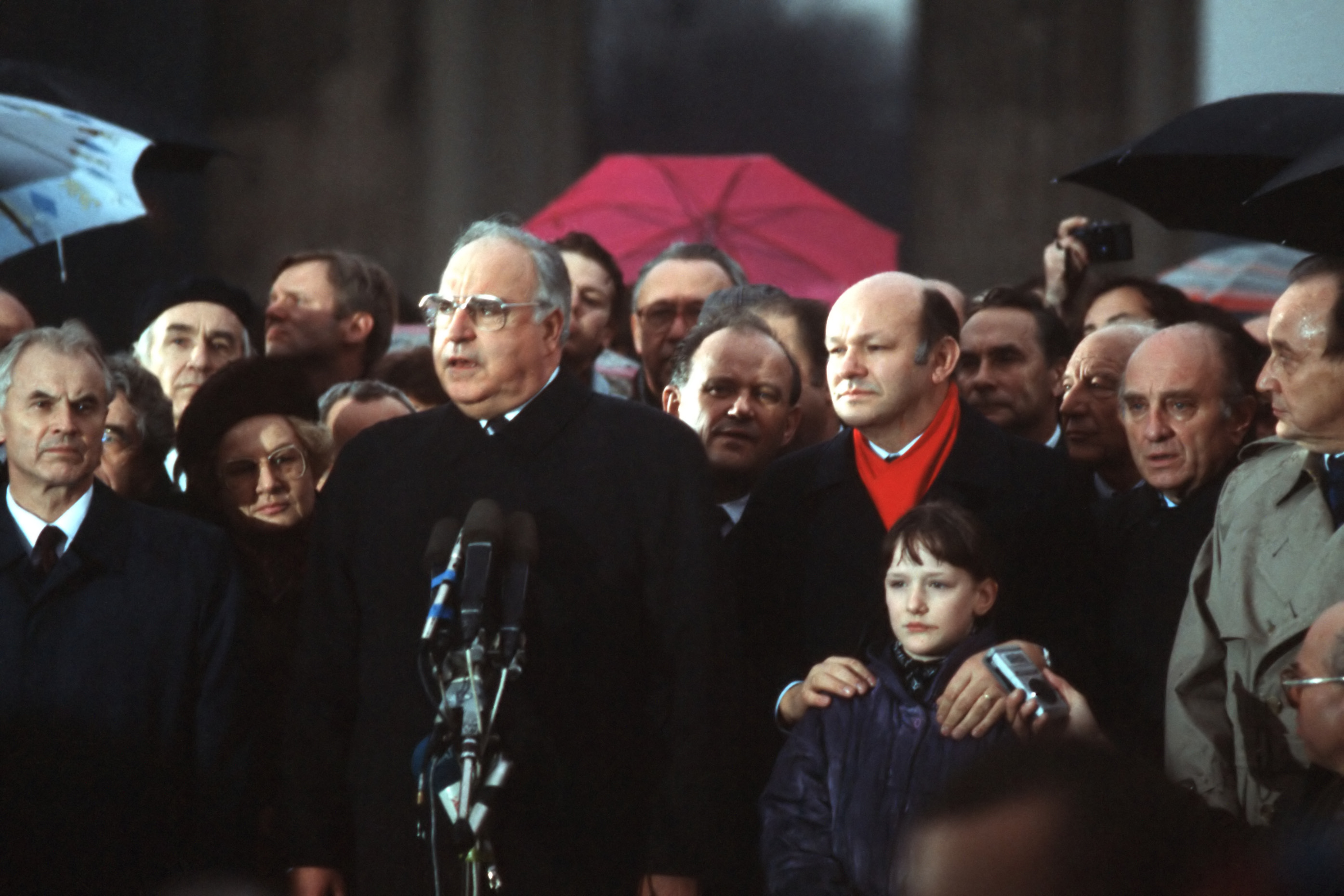
Helmut Kohl speaks at the official opening of the Brandenburger Gate in 1989.

The microphone was introduced at the Hannover Fair in 1971. From the 1970s onwards it could be seen in various television news programs, e.g. in Russia's main evening news program Vremya. Four MD 441s are visible in Barbara Klemm's famous 1979 photo of the socialist fraternal kiss between Soviet general secretary Leonid Brezhnev and Erich Honecker. The later Serbian President Slobodan Milošević spoke into six MD 441s at a large rally in Belgrade on 19 November 1988. At the Alexanderplatz demonstration on 4 November 1989 in Berlin, the speeches were spoken into two MD 441s. On 19 December 1989, Helmut Kohl spoke into an MD 441 in Dresden at his first major appearance after the fall of the Berlin Wall.

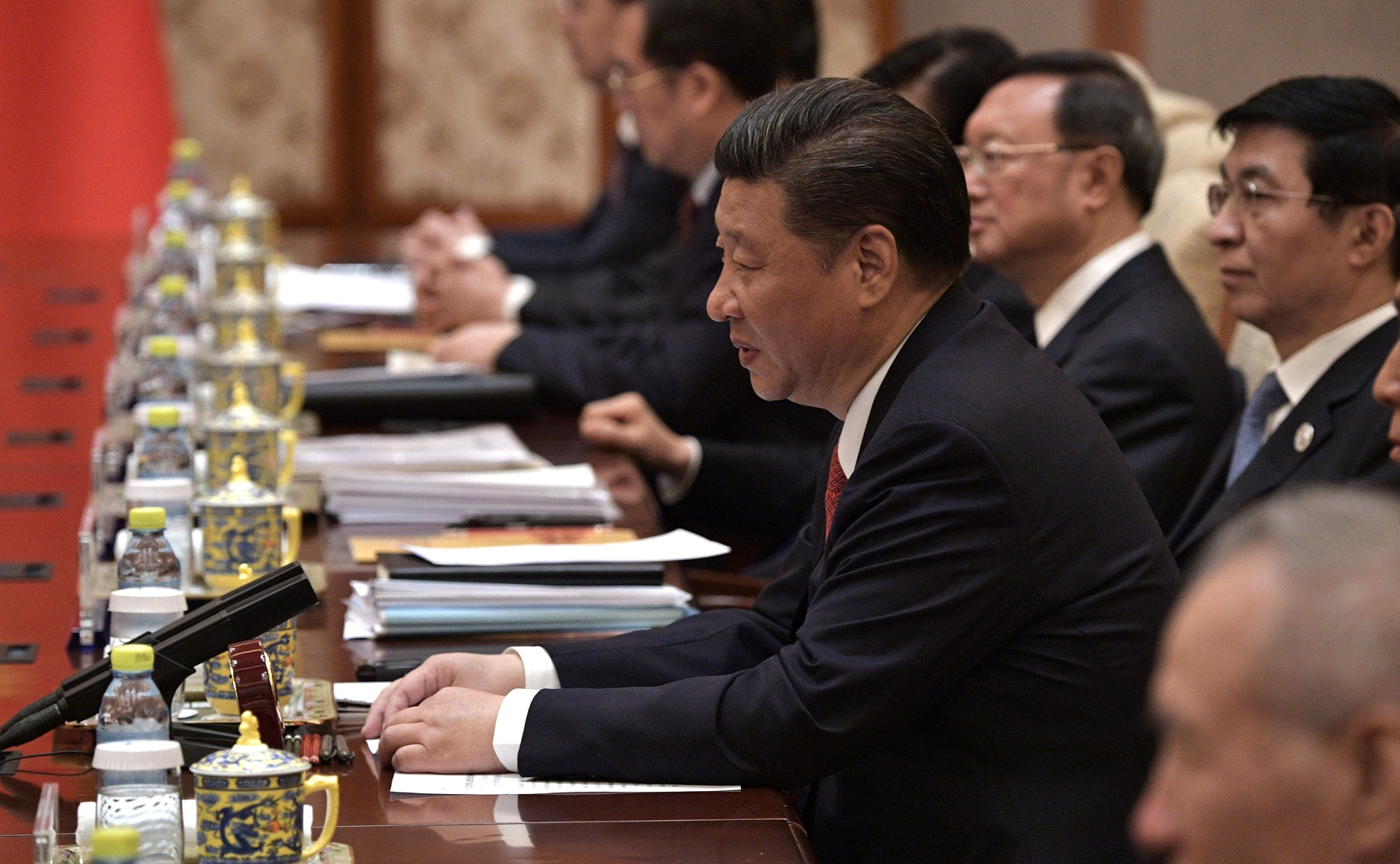
Xi Jinping with two MD 541 Blackfire (2017)

The British comedian Sacha Baron Cohen used an MD 441 in the film Brüno (2009) for his interview with Paula Abdul, in which both sit on the backs of kneeling men. In the 2010s, General Secretary of the Chinese Communist Party Xi Jinping was often pictured with two black MD 541 Blackfire at press conferences. Two MD 441s are used at the lectern in the House of Representatives of the Parliament of the Czech Republic.

=== Music ===
The MD 441 has also been used as a vocal microphone since the 1970s, by artists including Frank Zappa, Fleetwood Mac singer Stevie Nicks, David Bowie, and by The Cure lead singer Robert Smith during the band's first television appearance at a concert in Paris in 1979.

While the MD 441 as a broadcast microphone has largely been replaced by other models, it is still used today for recording musical instruments, particularly on drums, electric guitars and amplifiers, as well as woodwind instruments.

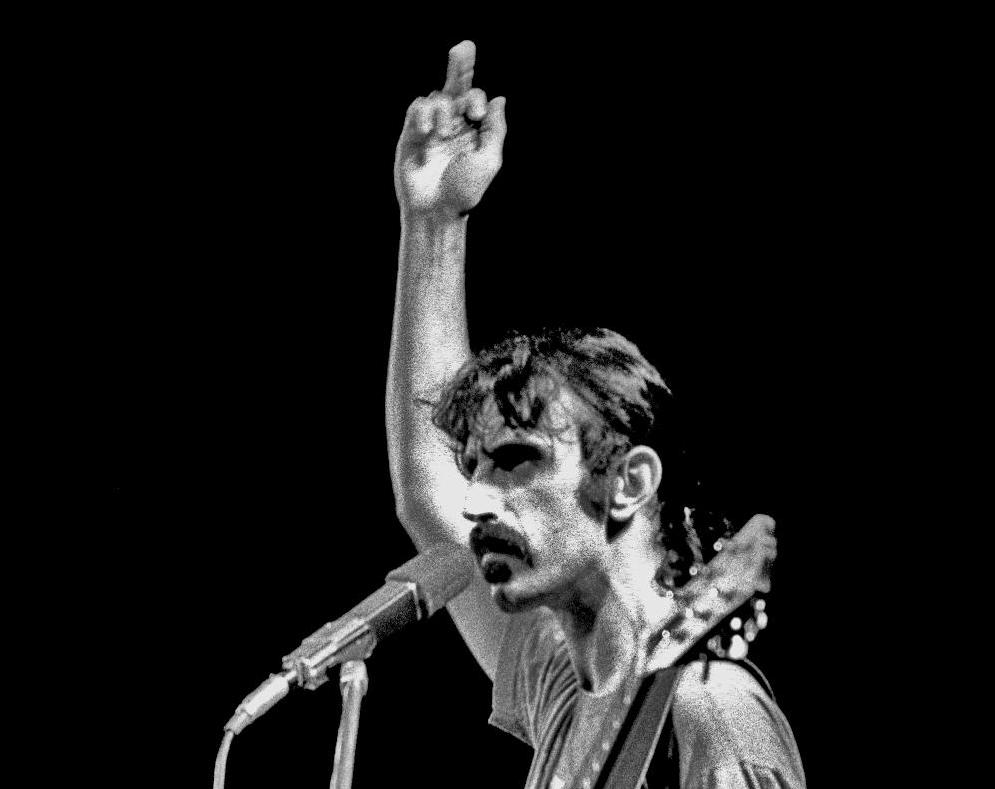
Frank Zappa and MD 441 with windscreen (1974)

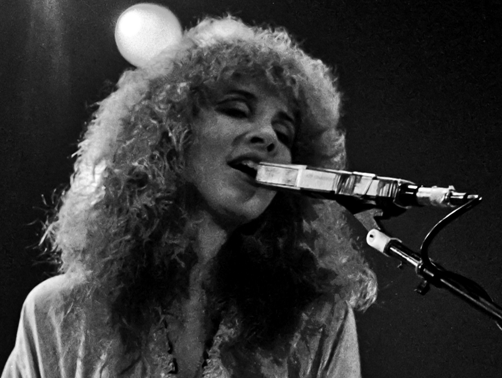
Stevie Nicks and MD 441 at a Fleetwood Mac concert in Zurich (1980)

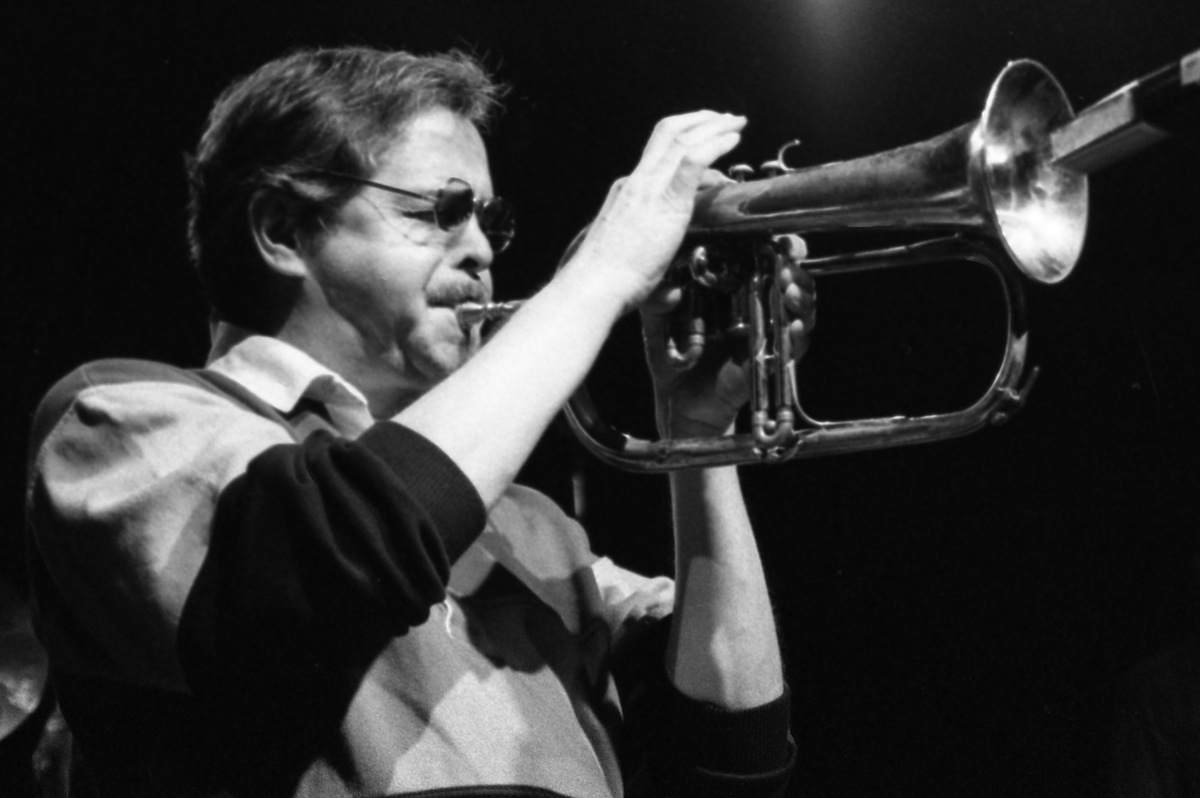
Kenny Wheeler with MD 441 (1992)
