= Wigbert Fehse =

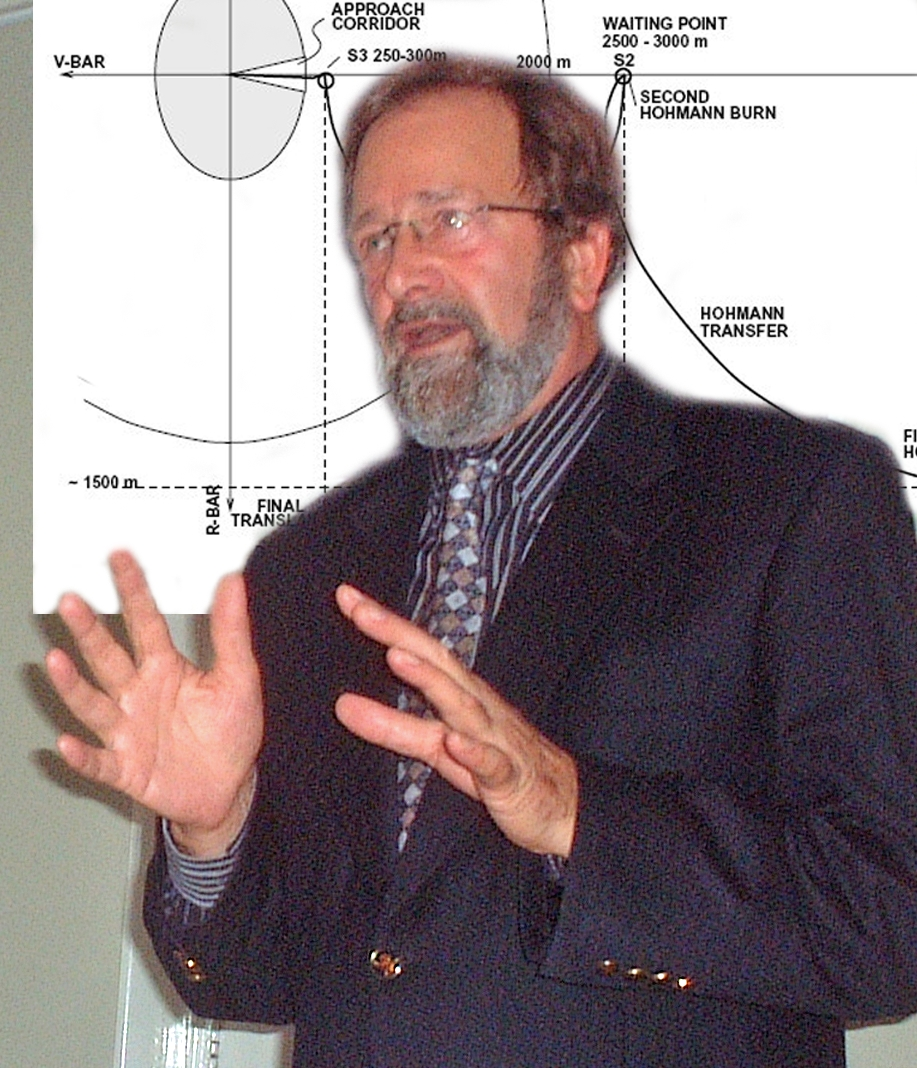
Dr. Wigbert Fehse

Wigbert Fehse (born 4 December 1937 in Berlin) is a German engineer and researcher in the area of automatic space navigation, guidance, control and docking/berthing.

== Biography ==
Fehse studied mechanics and aircraft guidance, navigation and control at the Technische Universität Berlin (Germany), where he received his Diplom in 1965. In 1972, the doctor's degree (summa cum laude) has been conferred on him by the Aerospace Institute of Technische Universität Berlin for his research and thesis on hydrostatic bearings as frictionless suspension in navigation instruments. In addition, in 1965 through 1973, he was responsible for the development of inertial navigation sensors and gyrostabilizers for satellites at Teldix (now Rockwell Collins, Inc.) in Heidelberg (Germany). In the following years he worked at ESTEC, the main technology development and test centre for spacecraft and space technology of the European Space Agency (ESA) at Noordwijk, The Netherlands, on attitude control and precision pointing problems and became later Head of the Navigation and Guidance Section. There, he and his teams at ESA and in industry developed basic techniques and technologies for automated rendezvous and docking of spacecraft, which are being applied in international space projects, such as the Automated Transfer Vehicle (ATV), the first West-European spacecraft that docked automatically to the International Space Station (ISS) in April 2008.

Since his retirement in 2002, Fehse supports European space companies as a consultant and adviser in rendezvous and coupling issues. These include rendezvous with non-cooperative targets (e.g. removal of space debris in Low Earth Orbit) and servicing of geostationary satellites disturbed by the effects of solar pressure. Furthermore, he continues to give specific lectures at universities and international institutes and industry.

Fehse is internationally known for his work in the area of automated rendezvous and docking/berthing of spacecraft. In addition to his numerous publications, his handbook on Automated Rendezvous and Docking of Spacecraft has been widely recognized. In 2011, his handbook has been translated into the Chinese language.

He contributed to the Encyclopedia of Aerospace Engineering - issued in 2010 - by writing the section on close proximity rendezvous and docking (RVD). In 2013 he wrote "Safety of Rendezvous and Docking Operations" as part of the Handbook on "Safety Design for Space Operations".

== Publications (short list) ==
- B. Claudinon, W. Fehse: Drivers, Techniques and Constraints of an Automatic Rendezvous and Docking Concept, XXXV IAF Congress, Lausanne 1984
- W. Fehse: Rendezvous and Docking Technology Development for Future European Missions, ESA Journal 1985, Vol. 9
- A. Elving, W. Fehse: Simulation Tools for the Development of an Autonomous Rendezvous and Docking System, Intelligent Autonomous Systems, An International Conference, Amsterdam 1986, ISBN 0-444-70168-0
- W. Fehse, R.H. Bentall: Motion Simulation for In-Orbit Operations, First European In-Orbit Operations Technology Symposium, Darmstadt, September 1887 (ESA SP-272)
- W. Fehse, A. Tobias, A. Getzschmann, M. Caldichoury, P. Maute, M. Attanasio: The role of Pilot and Automatic Onboard System in Future Rendezvous and Docking Operations, IAF-88-037
- W. Fehse, A. Tobias, C. Champetier, J.M. Pairot, C. Pauvert: A Guidance, Navigation and Control System for Rendezvous and Proximity Operations Between Hermes, the Columbus Free-Flyer and the Space Station Freedom, AAS-91-063
- W. Fehse, A. Vankov, P. Chliaev, F. Ankersen, A. Alyoshin: Remote Intervention in Automatic Onboard GNC Systems, 3rd International Conference on Spacecraft GNC Systems, Noordwijk, November 1996 (ESA SP-381)
- W. Fehse, G. Ortega: Operator Monitoring and Support System for Rendezvous and Docking, Paper ID: 2a004, SpaceOps98: Proceedings, Fifth International Symposium on Space Mission Operations and Ground Data Systems, Tokyo 1998
- M. Cislaghi, W. Fehse, D. Paris, F. Ankersen: The ATV Rendezvous Pre- Development Programme (ARP), Proceedings of the 22nd AAS Guidance and Control Conference, Beckenridge, Colorado, 1999
- W. Fehse: Automated Rendezvous and Docking of Spacecraft, Cambridge Aerospace Series 16, Cambridge University Press, 2003, ISBN 0-521-82492-3
- W.Fehse: Disturbance by Solar Pressure of Rendezvous Trajectories in GEO, 5th ICATT 2012, International Conference on Astrodynamics Tools and Techniques, ESA-Estec, Noordwijk, May 2012
