= Dear Reality =

German audio software company

Dear Reality GmbH
- Industry: Audio Software
- Founded: 2014; 12 years ago
- Founders: Christian Sander; Achim Fell
- Headquarters: Germany, Düsseldorf
- Products: dearVR UNITY (2016); dearVR PRO (2017); dearVR MUSIC (2017); dearVR SPATIAL CONNECT (2018); dearVR MONITOR (2019); dearVR MIX (2020); dearVR SPATIAL CONNECT for Wwise (2021); EXOVERB (2022); MIYA (2023); dearVR PRO 2 (2024)
- Number of employees: 21
- Website: dear-reality.com

Dear Reality GmbH is a German company specialising in 3D audio software and virtual acoustics. They have developed software tools for professional audio production of linear and interactive immersive audio content in augmented reality, virtual reality, video games, sound design and music.

== History ==
The company was founded by Christian Sander and Achim Fell in Düsseldorf, Germany 2014. In 2018 Sennheiser invested in Dear Reality and in 2019 acquired the company.

In 2025 the company announced end of developing their products. The license manager which authorizes all the products will be deactivated after July 31, 2025. But new versions of almost all the plugins without the license manager can now be download for free through Sennheiser AMBEO here.

== Products ==
Dear Reality is mainly known for its 3D audio mixing plugins; (stylised dearVR) dearVR Music, dearVR Pro and dearVR SPATIAL CONNECT.

Later their virtual monitoring plugin dearVR MONITOR became relevant in the audio industry for mixing Dolby Atmos through headphones.

Product History
YEAR	NAME	DESCRIPTION	VIDEO / LINK
2014	39 Stufen	Immersive Audio Radio Play Thriller for WDR	PDF
2015	dearAPI	Binaural Rendering Engine for iOS and Android	https://www.youtube.com/watch?v=8wTddiLCf6k
2016	dearVR UNITY	Binaural Spatializer Plugin for Unity3D	https://www.youtube.com/watch?v=34Y0dwVBq4c
2017	dearVR PRO	Binaural Spatializer VST/ AAX / AU Plugin	https://www.youtube.com/watch?v=zr-5RSiz-8Y
