= University Library of the TU Berlin and UdK =

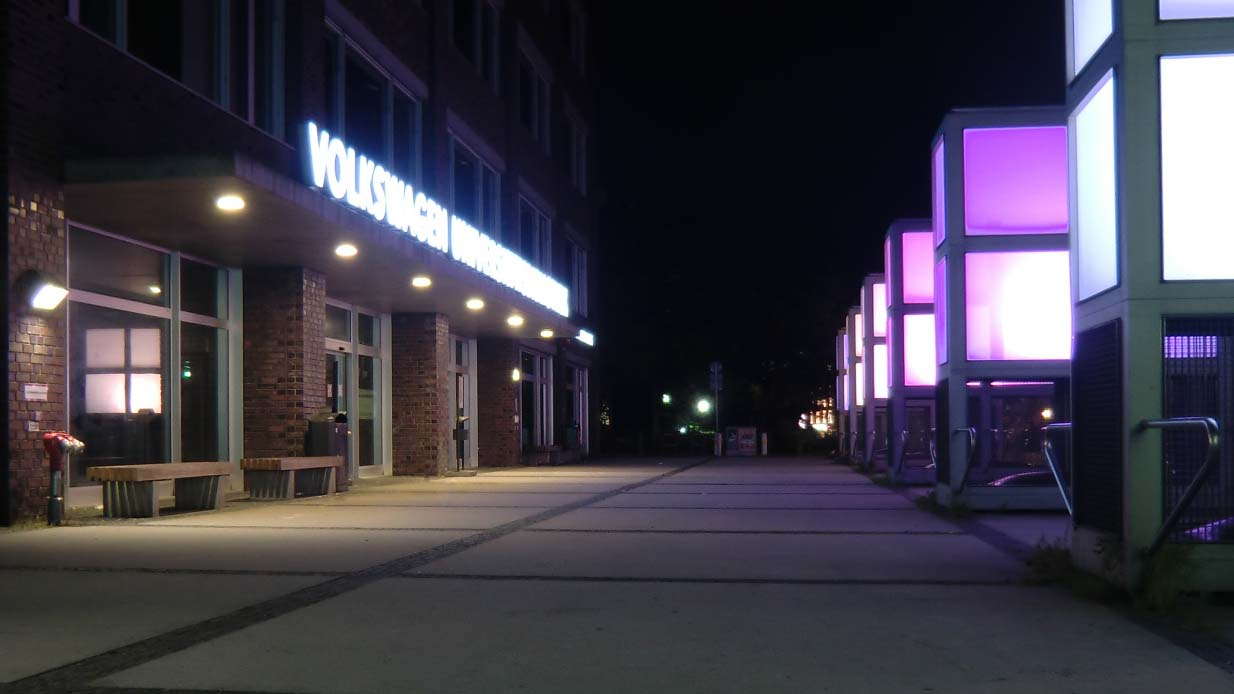
- 52°30′37″N 13°19′50″E
- Location: Berlin, Germany
- Type: Academic library
- Established: 2004

Other information
- Website: https://www.tu.berlin/en/ub/ https://www.ub.udk-berlin.de/

The University Library of the TU Berlin and UdK (German: Zentralbibliothek der TU und UdK Berlin) is the central library of the Technische Universität Berlin (TU Berlin) and the Berlin University of the Arts (UdK). It is located in the Fasanenstraße, Berlin. The current directors of the UdK and TU libraries are Andrea Zeyns and Jürgen Christof, respectively.

== History ==
Until 2004, each of the 17 departments of the TU Berlin had their own libraries. The catalogue of some of these libraries are now housed in the central library. On October 18, 2004, the new building was opened for public use. The first four floors are used by the TU and the fifth floor by the UdK. Apart from the central library several other libraries (school and department libraries) exists as part of the library system of the TU Berlin.

The building was built with a budget of EUR 56.3 million. Half of this was paid by the federal government, the other half by the TU and the Volkswagenstiftung. Construction began in the summer of 2002 and the library was officially opened on December 9, 2004.

== Gallery ==
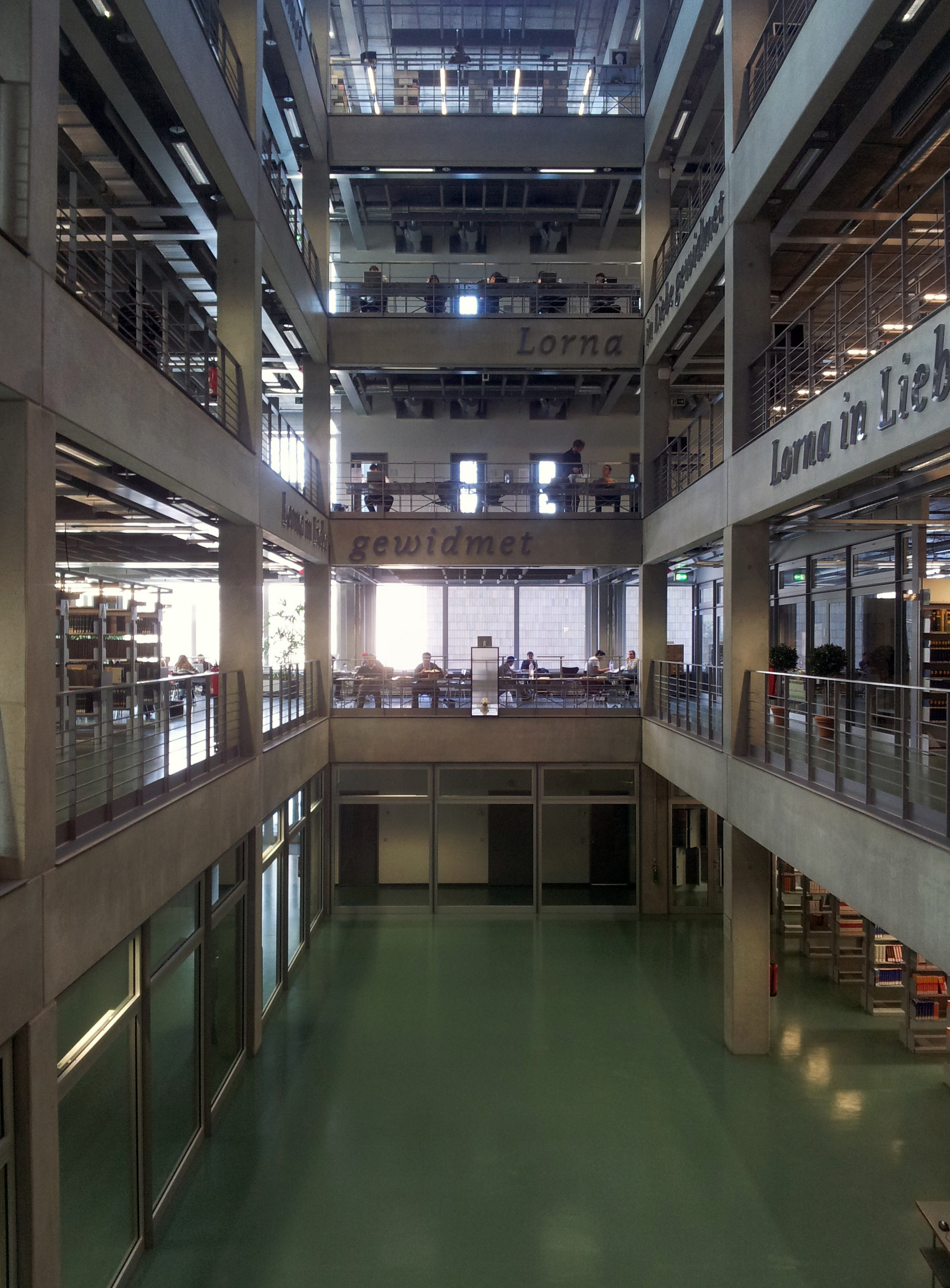
Interior view

== Bibliography ==
- Rüdiger Scheidges: Zu viele Hintertürchen. In: Der Spiegel (March 12, 2001), pp. 34–35.
- Wolfgang Zick, Andreas Richter, Uwe Meyer-Brunswick: Gemeinsamer Neubau der Universitätsbibliotheken der Technischen Universität Berlin (TU) und der Universität der Künste Berlin (UdK). In: Bibliothek 27 (2003), pp. 65–68.
