= Thomas Gil =

German philosopher

Thomas Gil is a Spanish-born German philosopher, currently University Professor of Practical Philosophy at Technische Universität Berlin.

Born in Madrid (Spain) on October 21, 1954, he received his Ph.D. in philosophy from the University of Münster in 1981 and his Habilitation from the University of Stuttgart in 1992.

After having held teaching appointments as an assistant professor and as associate professor at the University of Cologne and Stuttgart University from 1985 till 1995, he became in 1995 full professor of philosophy at the University of St. Gallen and in 1996 the Chaïm Perelman Professor at the Free University of Brussels (Belgium).

Beginning in 1998, he has been University Professor at Technische Universität Berlin. He has also been visiting professor at the University of Murcia (Spain), at the City University of London and the State University of New York at Albany). Gil is author of several books and articles on ethical judgments and normative structures, scientific research and practical reasoning, human action and rationality, in which he intends to clarify fundamental concepts human beings use to interpret natural reality and their own place in it, analytically examining the contexts in which specific arguments were developed and critically assessed in order to explain such concepts.

== Selected publications ==
- Ethik (Etica. Dalla polis greca alla società del rischio), 1993, ISBN 3-476-10276-9.
- Demokratische Technikbewertung, 1999, ISBN 3-87061-841-8.
- Kritik der klassischen Geschichtsphilosophie, 1999, ISBN 3-87061-856-6.
- Die Rationalität des Handelns, 2003, ISBN 3-7705-3802-1.
- Die Praxis des Wissens, 2006, ISBN 3-86525-213-3.
- Kritik des Empirismus, 2009, ISBN 978-3-86525-116-9.
- Actions, Normativity, and History, 2010, ISBN 978-3-86525-167-1.
- On Reasons, 2011, ISBN 978-3-86525-194-7.
- Mind Functions, 2012, ISBN 978-3-86525-278-4.
- Scientific Reasoning, 2012, ISBN 978-3-86525-287-6.
- Die Kunst der Unterscheidung, 2013, ISBN 978-3-7983-2600-2.
