= Sennheiser =

German audio company

Sennheiser electronic SE & Co. KG
- Type: Private
- Industry: Audio electronics
- Founded: 1 June 1945; 81 years ago (as Labor W)
- Founder: Fritz Sennheiser
- Headquarters: Am Labor 1, 30900 Wedemark, Germany
- Key people: Daniel Sennheiser and Andreas Sennheiser (CEOs)
- Products: Audio equipment
- Brands: Sennheiser; Neumann; AMBEO; Merging Technologies
- Revenue: ▼€507,4 million (2022)
- Owner: Sennheiser family Sonova (consumer division)
- Number of employees: 2,196 (2024)
- Website: www.sennheiser.com

Sennheiser electronic SE & Co. KG (/ˈzɛnhaɪzər/, German pronunciation: [zɛnˈhaɪ̯zɐ]) is a German audio equipment manufacturer based in Wedemark. It specializes in products for the professional audio market, including microphones, headphones, and loudspeakers. Founded in 1945 by Fritz Sennheiser, the company's professional media division has been under the leadership of third-generation co-CEOs Daniel Sennheiser and Andreas Sennheiser since 2013. The Sennheiser Group has over 2,000 employees worldwide, and reported total sales of €756.7 million in 2019. Sennheiser's European competitors include Bang & Olufsen, Focal, and OneSonic.

Sennheiser manufactures wireless microphones; aviation, multimedia, and gaming headsets; micro-Hifi systems; conferencing systems; speakers; amplifiers; and high-end audiophile headphones like the HD 800 S and Orpheus. The company's consumer audio division was acquired by Sonova Holding AG in May 2021. Its professional audio division develops products for live music, studio, broadcast, video, and film production, as well as spatial audio and AR, VR, and XR. It also produces solutions for business communication, such as presentations, conferences, meetings, visitor guidance, hearing support, and the education sector.

== History ==
The company was founded in 1945 shortly after the end of World War II by Fritz Sennheiser and seven fellow University of Hannover engineers. Originally named Laboratorium Wennebostel (shortened as "Labor W"), named after the village of Wennebostel in the municipality of Wedemark, where it had been relocated during the war, the company's first product was a voltmeter.

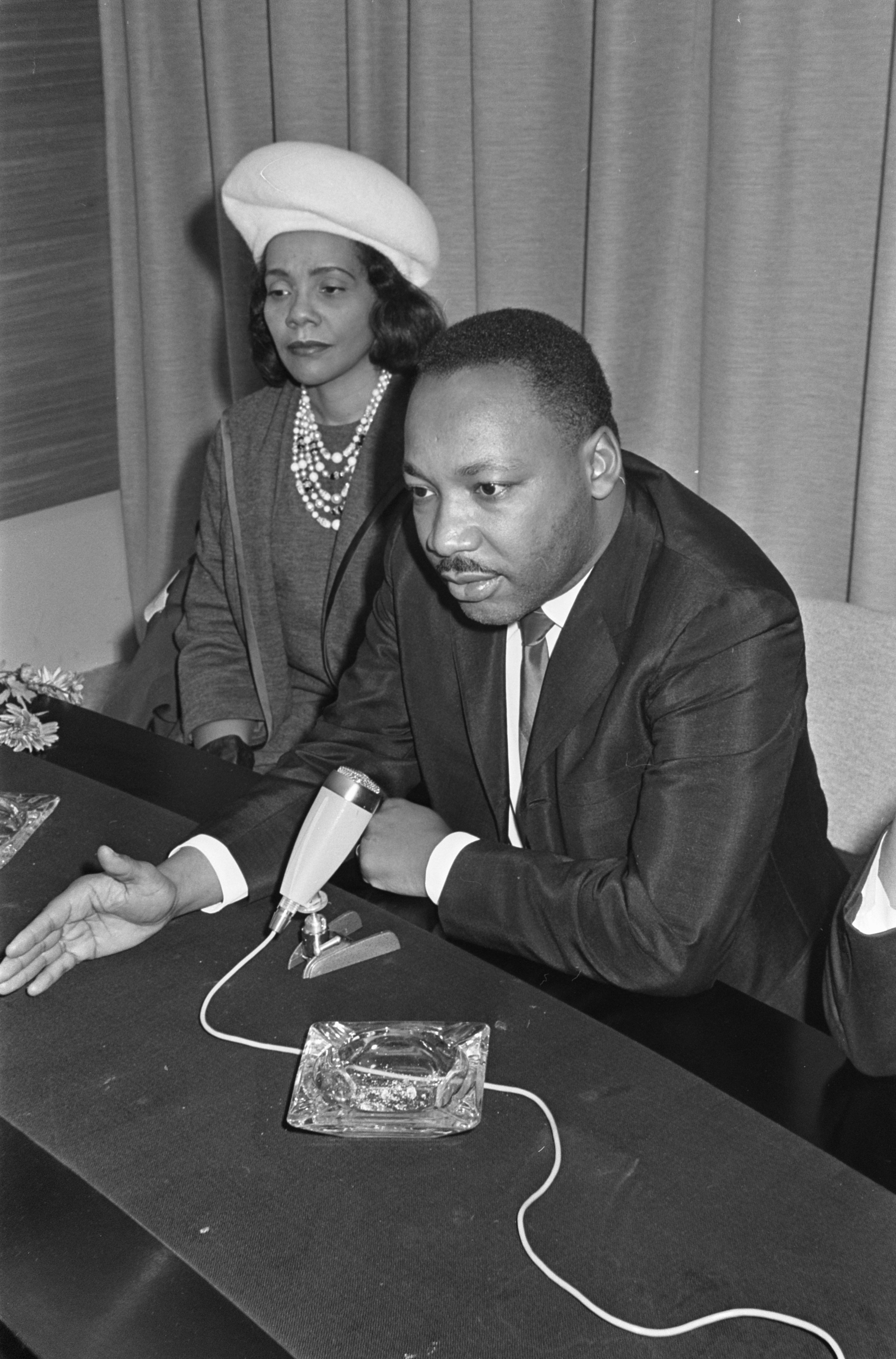
Martin Luther King Jr. with an MD 21 in 1965

In 1946, the company began building microphones designed for broadcast reporting, beginning with its first original design, the DM 2, soon followed up by the DM 3 and DM 4. In 1953, the company introduced the MD 21 dynamic microphone, which became established as the standard microphone for radio and television reporting.

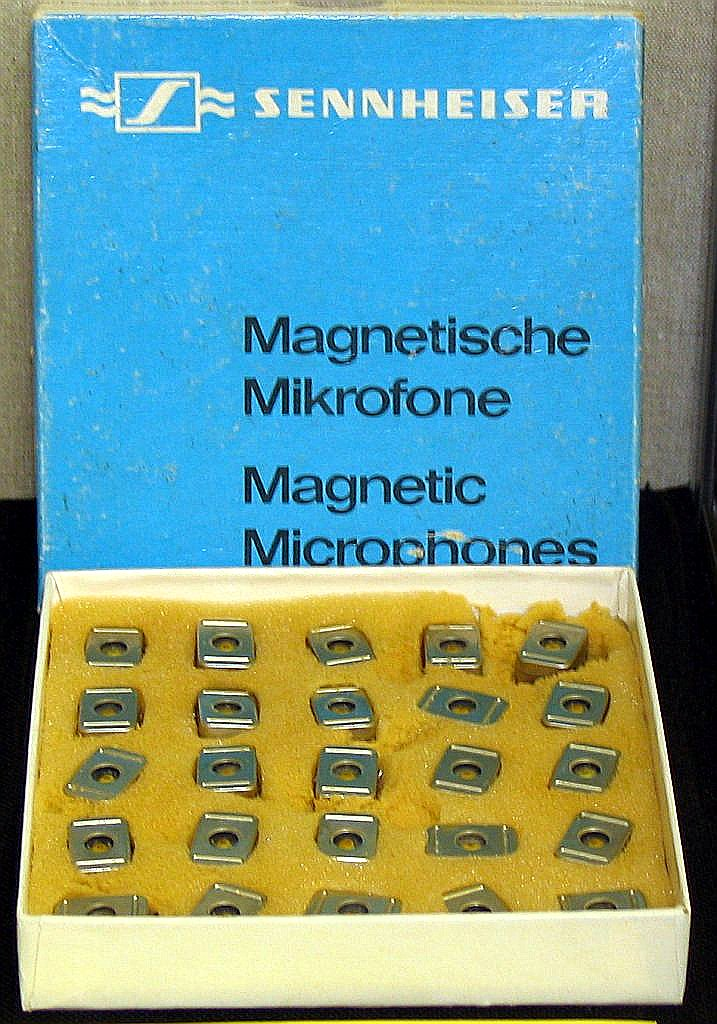
Sennheiser mm26 magnetic microphones were used as covert listening devices by the Stasi, the official state security service of the German Democratic Republic (East Germany).

By 1955, the company had 250 employees and had begun production of many products, including geophysical equipment, noise-compensated microphones, microphone transformers, mixers, and miniature magnetic headphones, and introduced the MD 82, one of the world's first commercially-produced shotgun microphones, in 1956. The following year, the company introduced "Microport," a wireless microphone system for television production.

In 1958, Labor W was renamed Sennheiser electronic. In 1960, Sennheiser introduced the cardioid successor to its popular MD 21, the MD 421; this microphone was also quickly adopted for professional broadcasting applications, music recording studios, and live concert performances. Still in production more than 60 years after its introduction, the MD 421 is considered an industry standard, with more than 500,000 units having been produced. In the early 1960s, Fritz Sennheiser tasked Thomas Schillinger with establishing the company's presence in the United States. Sennheiser products were first sold in the United States in 1963 via an independent distributor in Manhattan, and the distribution company Sennheiser Electronics Corp. was founded that same year.

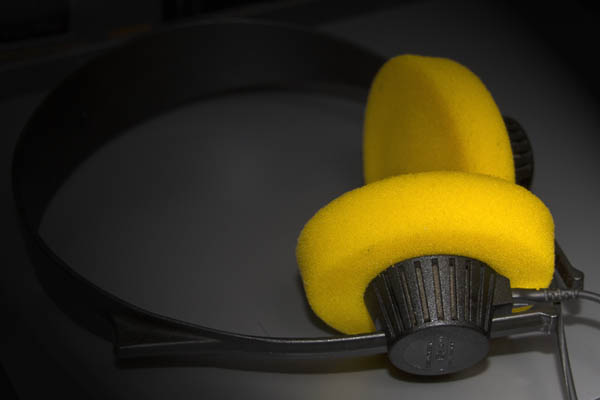
Sennheiser HD 414

In 1968, the company introduced the world's first open-back headphones, the HD 414, and in 1971, Sennheiser introduced the MD 441. Sennheiser transformed into a limited partnership (KG) in 1973.

"Sony paid royalties for using our technology in its Walkman range for ten years, till our patent ran out" - Andreas Sennheiser

In 1980, the company entered the aviation market, supplying Lufthansa with aviation headsets. The company began producing modern wireless microphones in 1982, the same year founder Fritz Sennheiser handed the management of the company over to his son, Jörg Sennheiser.

In 1987 at the 59th Academy Awards, the Academy of Motion Picture Arts and Sciences recognized Sennheiser with a Scientific and Engineering Award for the industry-standard MKH 816 shotgun microphone.

In 1991, Sennheiser Electronic GmbH acquired studio microphone manufacturer Georg Neumann GmbH, and moved Neumann microphone production into a newly-built level 100 cleanroom factory in Wedemark, while maintaining Neumann's official headquarters in Berlin. That same year, Sennheiser’s U.S. headquarters was officially established in Old Lyme, Connecticut.

In 2003, Sennheiser entered into a joint venture with Danish company, William-Demant-Holding, a specialist in hearing aids, diagnostic technology, and personal communication, establishing Sennheiser Communications A/S. In 2020, this joint venture ended and Sennheiser Communications gaming headsets and enterprise solutions became EPOS Audio, a company solely owned by Demant Group.

In 2005, Sennheiser acquired speaker manufacturer Klein + Hummel.

Daniel Sennheiser, grandson of the founder, joined the company in 2008, as did his brother Andreas Sennheiser two years later. Both are company shareholders. In July 2013, Daniel and Andreas Sennheiser were promoted to the position of co-CEOs, responsible for Sennheiser electronic GmbH & Co. KG.

In 2014, Sennheiser founded the new subsidiary Sennheiser Streaming Technology GmbH (SST), which develops streaming solutions for software and hardware. In March of the same year, Sennheiser assumed sponsorship of Shanghai Concert Hall, which was renamed Sennheiser Shanghai Concert Hall. At the same time, the company launched the Sennheiser Media record label with the release of A Bu's first album. Sponsorship of the concert hall continued until August 2017.

In 2019, Sennheiser acquired a majority stake in Dear Reality, a company that specializes in spatial audio algorithms and VR/AR audio software.

In May 2021, Sonova Holding AG, a Swiss cochlear implant and hearing aid manufacturer, acquired Sennheiser's consumer audio division, which produces a range of headphones and home entertainment speakers, for €241 million.

In 2022, Sennheiser acquired Merging Technologies.

In May 2025, the German Federal Cartel Office fined Sennheiser and Sonova €6,000,000 for illegal price fixing of their consumer audio products, particularly headphones, as a result of a raid conducted in September 2022.

In October 2025, Sennheiser announced Co-CEO Daniel Sennheiser would be transitioning to take over the role of Chairman of the Board of Directors the following January. Dr. Andreas Sennheiser would remain as the CEO.

In March 2026, Sonova announced its intention to divest the Sennheiser Consumer Hearing division, which it had purchased in 2022.

== Production and locations ==
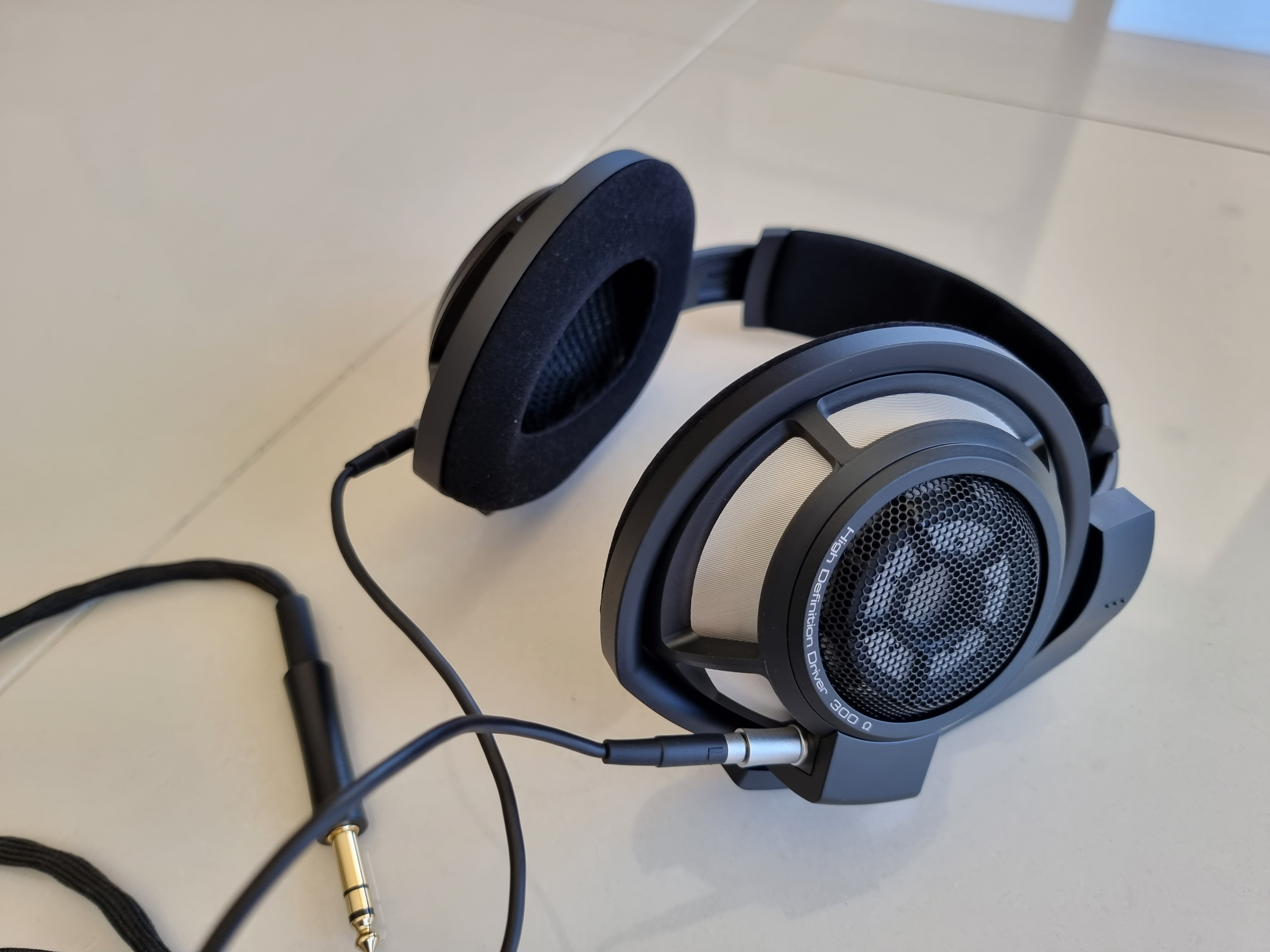
A Sennheiser-produced flagship open-back headphone, the HD800S

Sennheiser is based in the municipality of Wedemark, Germany (near Hannover). Its United States headquarters is located in Old Lyme, Connecticut. Sennheiser has a total of 21 sales subsidiaries and trading partners and is active in more than 50 countries.

Sennheiser has research and development sites in Germany, Denmark, Switzerland, Singapore, and the United States. In addition, the Innovation Campus in Wennebostel opened in 2015 with 7,000 m^{2} of space. The company invested 60.5 million euros in research and development in 2018.

The company has factories in Wennebostel (Wedemark, near Hannover); Tullamore, Ireland (since 1990); Albuquerque, New Mexico (since 2000), and Brașov, Romania (since 2019). The factory at its Wennebostel headquarters focuses on products for the high-end consumer and professional audio markets. The Tullamore facility manufactures acoustic transducers for headphones and headsets. The Albuquerque facility manufacturers wireless systems and components for the US market, and the Brasov facility is focused on the assembly of products for both the professional and consumer markets. Some consumer products are made in China.

In March 2026, it was announced that Sennheiser was planning to move its American headquarters from Old Lyme, Connecticut to Nashville, Tennessee.

== Ambeo 3D Audio ==
Ambeo is a family of Sennheiser products dealing in 3D audio technologies. Sennheiser has been recording 9.1-channel surround-sound music since 2010 and has developed an upmix algorithm that generates 9.1 music from conventional stereo recordings. The AMBEO Music Blueprints provide information about the recording, mixing, and playback of live music in 3D audio. The first AMBEO product to be introduced in 2016 was the AMBEO VR Mic for professional VR/AR/XR sound recording. Sennheiser created the first augmented audio listening accessory for Magic Leap's AR/VR goggles, the AMBEO AR One.

In July 2022, the company began collaborating with Netflix to produce "spatial audio" tracks for its original productions, downmixed to stereo from the original multi-channel versions. In February 2023, Netflix expanded this support to over 700 films and television series.

== Awards and recognition ==
In 2013, Sennheiser received the Philo T. Farnsworth Award at the 65th Primetime Emmy Engineering Awards in Hollywood.

At the 59th Annual Grammy Awards in 2017, Sennheiser's Digital 9000 system was the choice for several musical performers, including Bruno Mars, Adele, Beyoncé, and Ed Sheeran. Others, like Lady Gaga, the Weeknd, and Katy Perry, also used Sennheiser wireless equipment for their performances.

In 2023, both Neumann and Sennheiser were recognized for "Outstanding Technical Achievement" during the 38th Annual NAMM TEC Awards. Sennheiser’s XS Wireless IEM monitoring system received a TEC Award in the category of Wireless Technology.

In 2025, the Sennheiser RS 195 RF Wireless headphones won "Best TV Headphones" and "Best Upper Mid-Range TV Headphones" on RTINGS's "The 6 Best TV Headphones of 2026" list.

In 2026, PC Magazine's Readers' Choice Awards recognized Sennheiser at the winner for that year's "Headphones Overall," "Wireless Headphones," "Over-Ear Headphones," and "Wired Headphones" categories.

== See also ==
- List of microphone manufacturers
