= OneSonic =

Irish consumer electronics company

- Industry: Audio electronics
- Founded: 2019
- Founder: David Cawley
- Headquarters: Dublin, Ireland
- Products: Audio equipment
- Website: onesonic.com

OneSonic is an Irish audio electronics company founded in 2019. It produces and sells headphones, earphones and speakers. It was founded by David Cawley, who had previously established audio design consultancy Allegro Acoustics in 2010. OneSonic's products are designed in Ireland.

In June 2023, OneSonic announced an intention to enter the United States market. In November 2024, it announced it was raising funds to expand into the German and UK markets. In October 2025, OneSonic secured almost €2 million in funding to pursue a global expansion of the business.
