= Sennheiser MD 421 =

German dynamic microphone

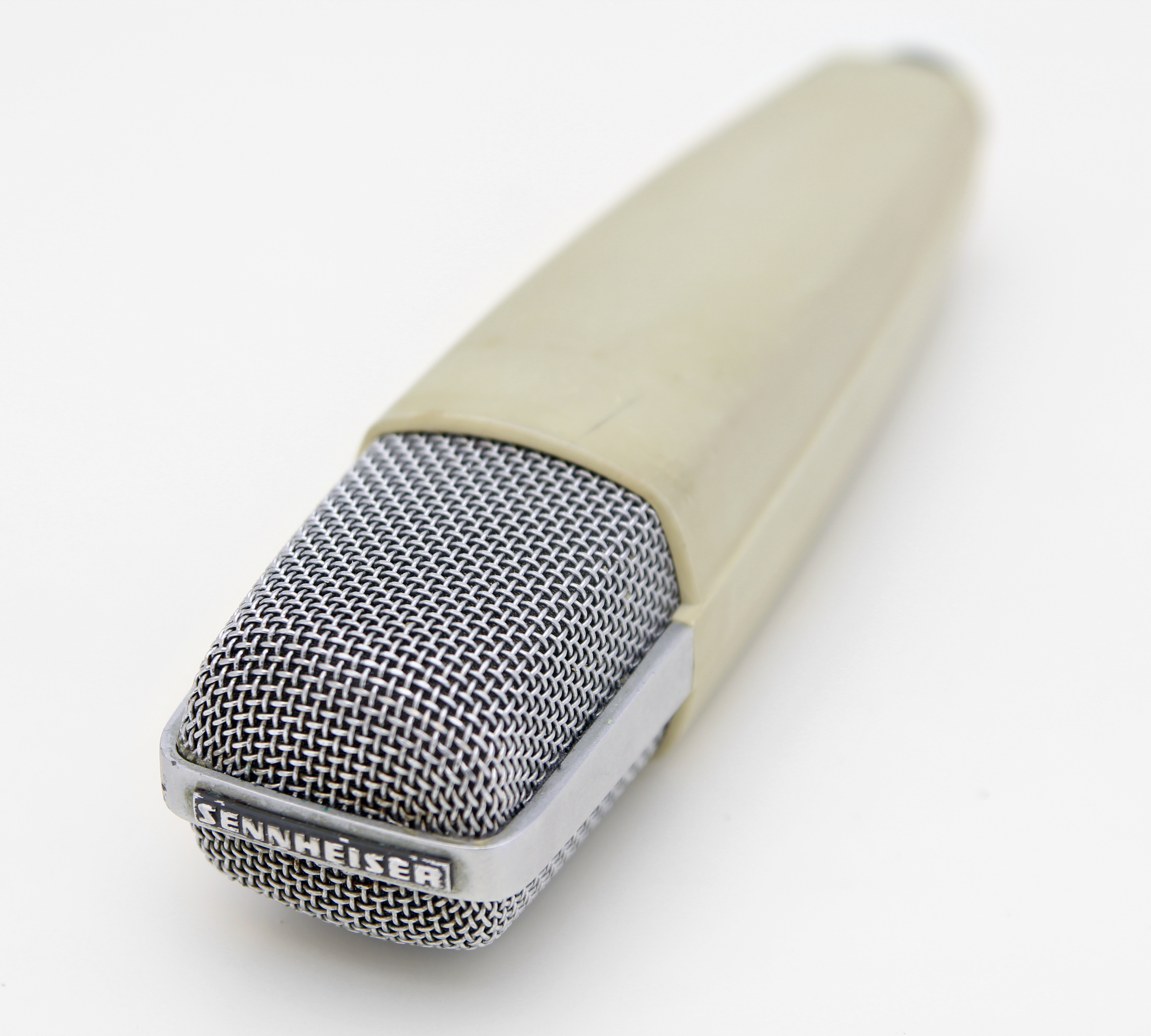
Sennheiser MD 421 microphone, original light gray model

The Sennheiser MD 421 is a German cardioid dynamic microphone, widely used for speech in broadcasting and for music in live concerts and the recording studio. Introduced in 1960, the internal large-diaphragm transducer element of the MD 421 is still produced unchanged by Sennheiser. The MD 421 is considered a classic and an industry standard. More than 500,000 units have been sold.

== Properties ==
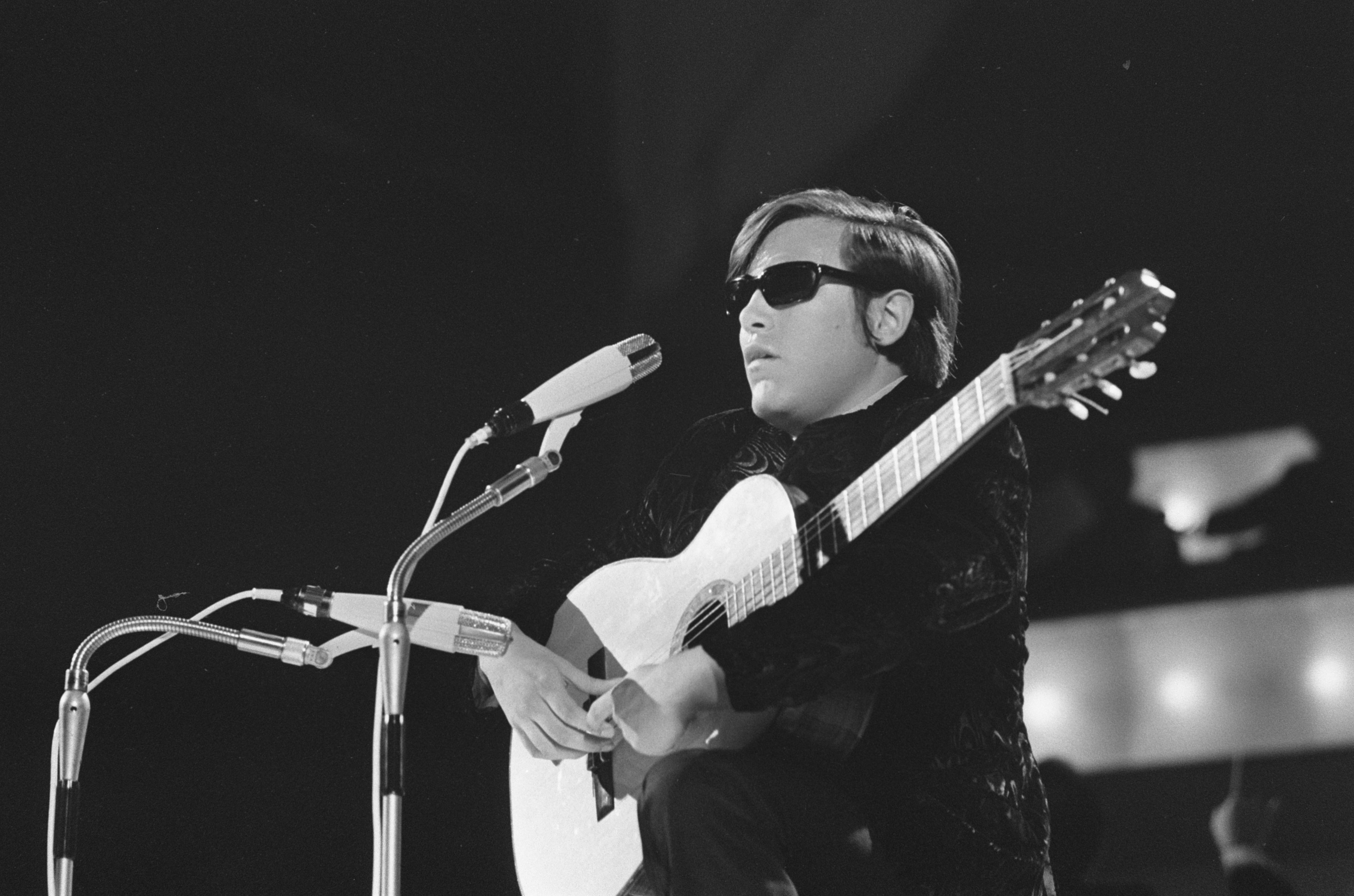
Jose Feliciano with two MD 421 microphones (for vocals and guitar) in 1970

With a diaphragm diameter of 27 millimeters (1.1 in), the MD 421 is classified as a large-diaphragm microphone. Its wide frequency response (30–17,000 Hz ± 3 dB) exceeded the former Hi-Fi standard and came close to the performance of condenser microphones. The compact design of the MD421 transducer system was novel at the time, because directional pickup patterns had only been achieved by adding sound entry ports to the rear of the element (for instance, the Electro-Voice "variable-D system" with a row of ports in the handle.) Microphones with sound-shaping ports could only be held in the hand to a limited extent without the directional effect deteriorating. The MD 421 offered a smooth, closed plastic housing without ports, retaining its directional pickup pattern no matter how it was held.

Another special technical feature of the MD 421 is the hum compensation coil: It is wired in opposite polarity to the coil of the converter system. Low-frequency interference fields common to both coils are canceled out.

All MD 421s with European Kleintuchel or American XLR connectors have a knurled plastic ring between the housing and the connector, with which an adjustable inductive high-pass filter (roll-off filter) can be operated. The "S" (speech) position attenuates the transmission of low frequencies, and the "M" (music) position allows the microphone's full response. The intermediate positions of this filter have been provided with a detent mechanism and markings since the 1970s.

== History ==
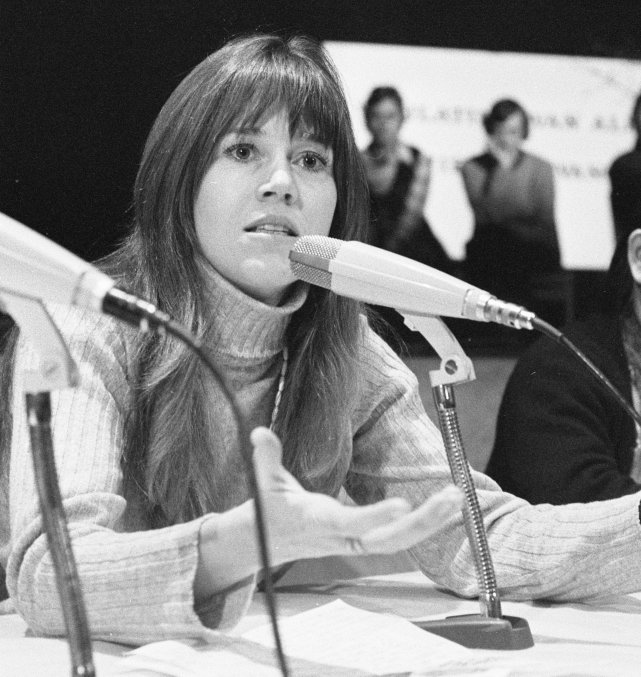
Jane Fonda speaks in Nijmegen in 1975.

Sennheiser developed the omnidirectional MD 21 model in 1953, for electronic news-gathering. The "MD" stood for Mikrophon dynamisch (dynamic microphone). At the end of the 1950s, Fritz Sennheiser directed engineers Paul-Friedrich Warning and Johann-Friedrich Fischer to develop a new microphone. In 1960, the MD 421 was introduced with a directional pickup pattern, advertised by the manufacturer as a studio microphone. The light-colored body of the MD 421 was made out of a DuPont polyoxymethylene compound sold as Delrin. Later versions of the MD 421 were molded in black composite.

Since its introduction in 1960, the MD 421 has established itself in almost all areas of professional sound technology, especially radio and television transmission technology as well as public address technology (PA). In addition to its sonic advantages, the microphone also achieved success thanks to the "music / speech filter" mentioned above. This high-pass filter has proven itself both when used as a vocal microphone (suppression of the proximity effect and plosives) and when broadcasting and recording outside to reduce wind noise. Handling noises and low-frequency street noise have been effectively reduced.

The characteristic shape of the MD 421 was part of the appearance of countless press conferences, political speeches and television reports well into the 1990s. In 1971, Sennheiser introduced another dynamic microphone but with a very long metal grille: the Sennheiser MD 441, which became another classic.

In 2010, the MD 421 was inducted into the TEC Awards TECnology Hall of Fame.

== Use ==
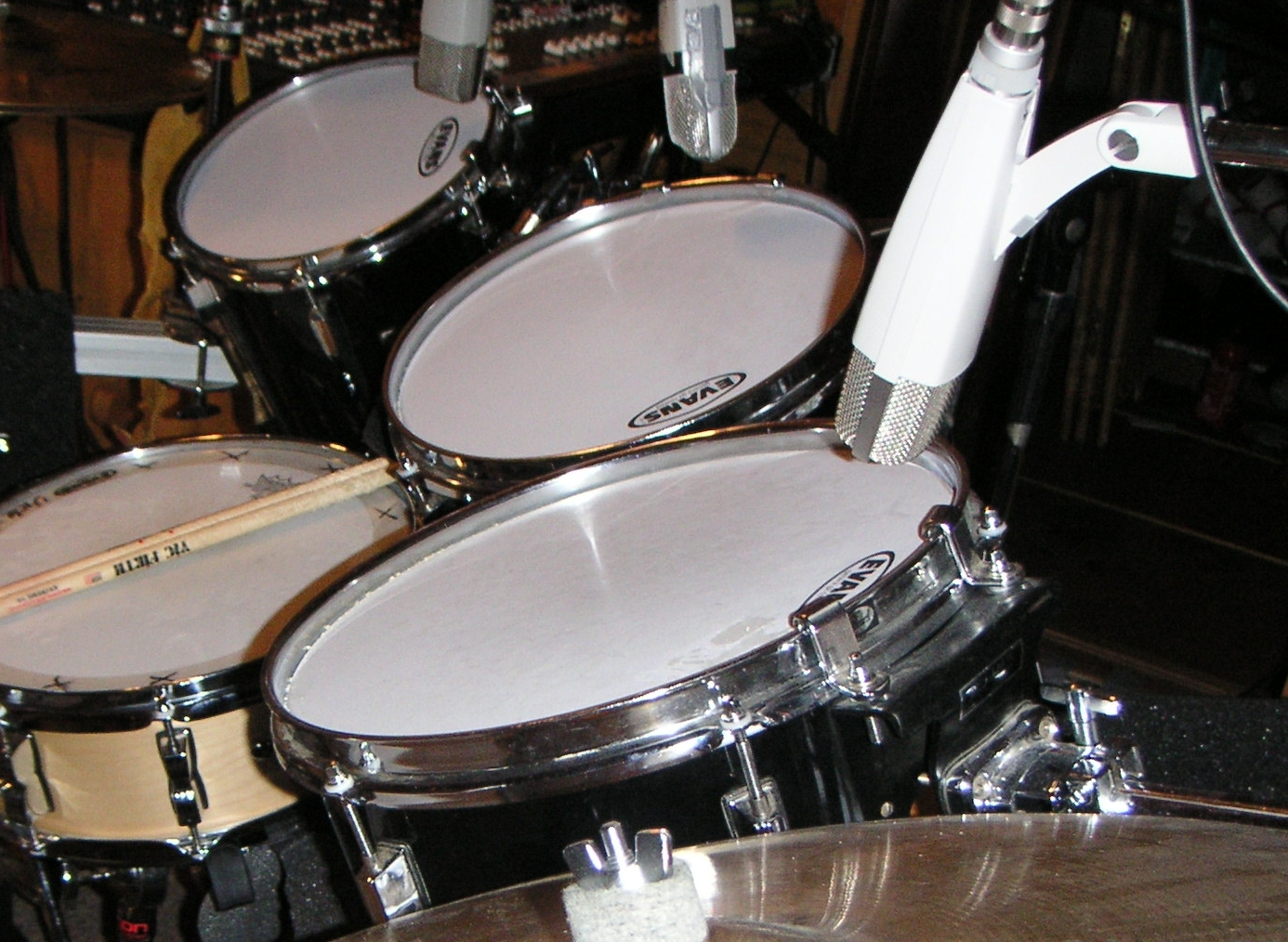
Three MD 421s aimed at tom drums. This can introduce unwanted off-axis leakage from nearby cymbals.

The microphone is popular with recording engineers, used in the production of all genres of music. The MD 421 is primarily used for drums, guitar amplifiers, woodwinds, brass and percussion instruments. It is known for its almost linear frequency response in the bass range up to 1,000 Hz. Above that, the microphone exhibits a smooth increase in upper mid-range frequencies important for intelligibility.

In 1966, Udo Jürgens won the Eurovision Song Contest, singing the song "Merci, Chérie" into an MD 421. By 1971, the contest was almost entirely performed on MD 421 microphones. The Concert for Bangladesh by George Harrison included many MD 421s.

As a large-element dynamic microphone, it has slower impulse response and less resolution in higher frequencies compared to condenser microphones, and is therefore less suitable as the main microphone to record an orchestra, or as the overhead microphone for a drum kit, to capture the fast transients of cymbals. But it excels at its intended job: Jazz guitarist Brian Tarquin referred to the ubiquitous American Shure SM57 when he described the MD 421 as "an SM57 on steroids... probably one of the most diverse mics ever made."

Studio engineer J. J. Blair noted that the MD 421 picks up an annoying aspect of the cymbals on a drum kit if the microphones are aimed at the tom drums. The off-axis response of the microphone is not high fidelity, and the undesirable cymbal sounds coming in off-axis seem to Blair like "breaking glass". It is possible to gate the tom mics to reduce extraneous sounds, but this method does not let the toms ring out fully after being struck, and does not allow the sympathetic vibrations of the tom heads to augment other parts of the drum kit such as snare and kick. Blair recommends other microphones for toms, or simply to capture toms and cymbals with overhead microphones. Blair uses the MD 421 on bass guitar cabinets and other select applications.

=== Musical instruments ===
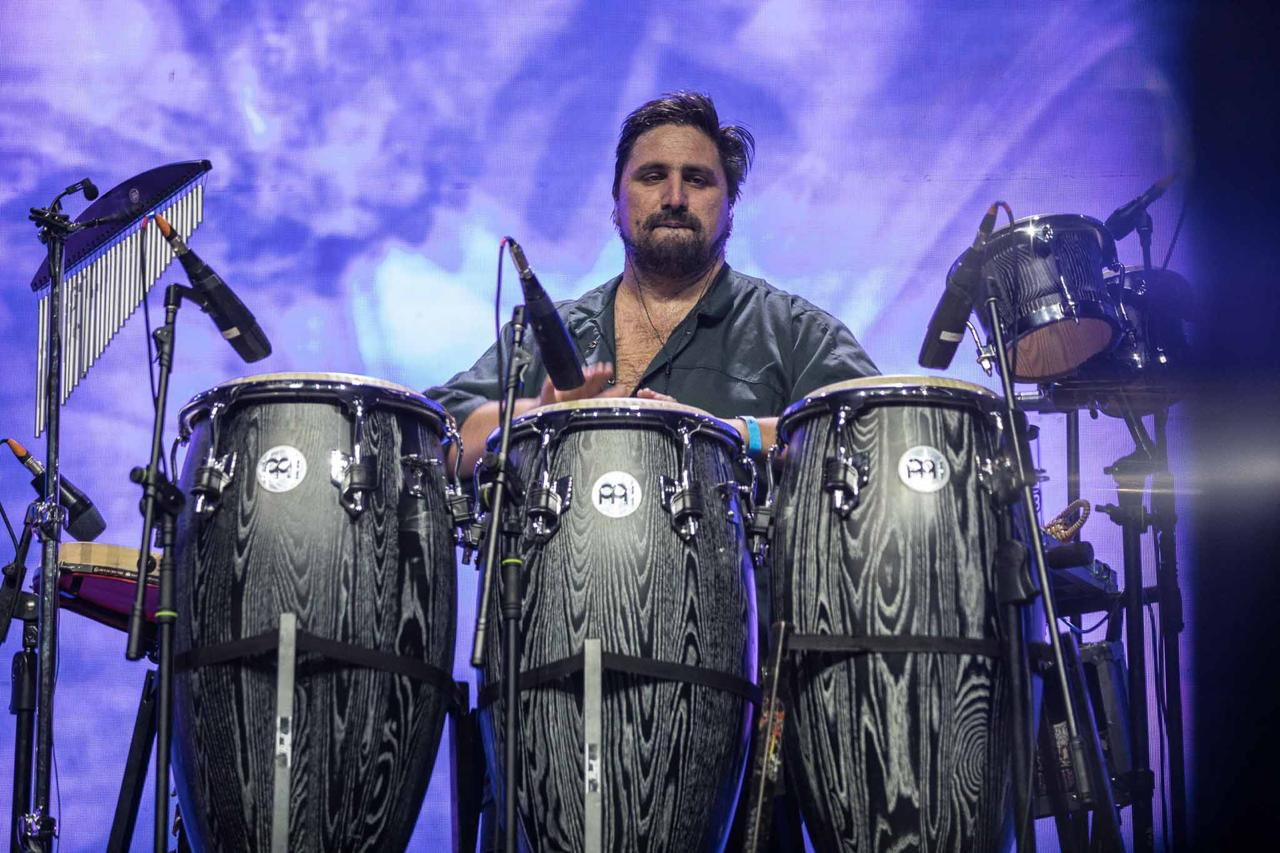
Chilean percussionist Gonzalo Foure performs on three congas miked with black MD 421 II models.

The MD 421 can withstand high sound pressure levels, and it can record a wide dynamic range. It is frequently used on the following musical sources:

- Bass drum (kick drum)
- Floor tom
- Rack toms
- Cajón at the rear port
- Conga, dumbek, bodhrán, tumba and other drums
- Leslie speaker, lower section
- Trombone
- Trumpet
- Saxophone (all sizes)
- Flute
- Bass clarinet
- Guitar amplifier
- Bass amplifier
- Vocals

== Accessories ==
The available accessories for the MD 421 include a short microphone stand to be used atop tables (model name MZT) and a windscreen (MZW) to cut wind noise; early windscreens were made of nylon and later ones of polyurethane foam. A shock-mount microphone clip (MZS) provides greater isolation for heavy vibrations that might be carried through the microphone body.

The standard-issue microphone clip (MZA) is a quick-change device that latches into a groove on the housing to hold the microphone upright. (Due to its unusual shape, the MD 421 cannot be used with commonly available microphone clips.) The supplied microphone clip is pushed into a groove on the underside of the microphone and mechanically locked with a quick-release button. Many users have complained about the tendency of the supplied microphone clip to let go of the microphone, allowing it to drop, especially when adjusted quickly for instrumental solos, or when mounted to point downward at a tom drum. Various solutions suggested by engineers include ways to prevent movement of the quick-release mechanism, for instance with a small zip tie. Others have fabricated a larger plastic clip that works more like a standard microphone clip.

== Versions ==
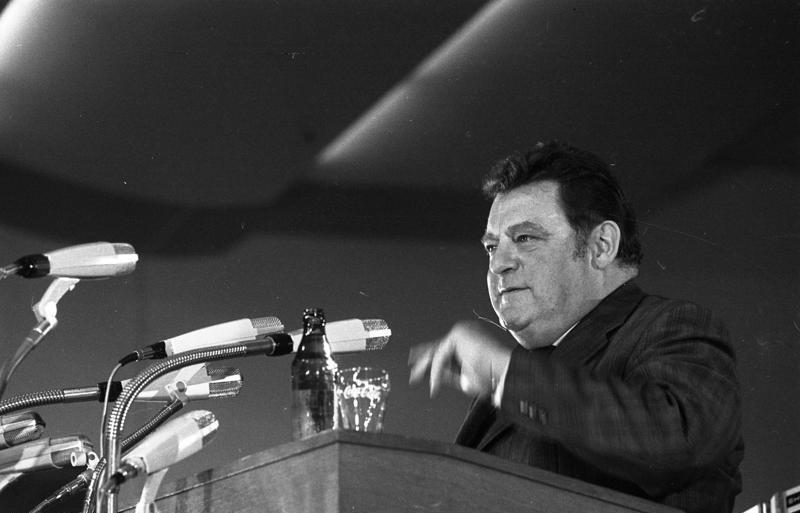
German politician Franz Josef Strauss gives a press conference in 1972.

The microphone was produced in the following versions:

- MD 421–2 with light gray / silver-colored housing and balanced, 3-pin threaded connector wired according to DIN 41624.
- MD 421-N with light gray / silver-colored housing, 5-step rotary switch for stepped bass reduction and balanced, 3-pin threaded connector wired according to DIN 41524.
- MD 421 de Luxe with black housing, gold-colored grille, same internally as the MD 421-N.
- MD 421-HL with light gray / silver-colored housing and balanced/unbalanced connector wired according to DIN 41524, and a transformer for optional high-impedance connection to consumer tape recorders.
- MD 421-U has a black housing and balanced XLR connector. The 421 U4 and U5 versions differ in the thread on the removable microphone clip. Version U4 has an interchangeable thread, while U5 has a thread with a fixed 3/8-inch dimension for the American market.
- MD 421 II introduced in 1998. Essentially the same as MD 421-U but manufactured with more economical processes.
- MD 521 "Blackfire": black housing and balanced XLR connection, but without the 5-step bass cut switch.

== Kompakt ==
In 2024, Sennheiser introduced a smaller version: the MD 421 Kompakt model. The microphone is intended for tight locations such as a drum kit or in front of a guitar amplifier on a small stage. Its new swivel clip is integral to the microphone, not removable. A drum clamp is available as the MZH model.

== See also ==
- Shure SM7
