= Fritz Sennheiser =

German inventor and entrepreneur

- Born: 9 May 1912; Berlin, German Empire
- Died: 17 May 2010 (aged 98); Wedemark, Germany
- Education: Technische Universität Berlin
- Occupations: Inventor and entrepreneur
- Known for: Founder of Sennheiser
- Children: 2, including Jörg Sennheiser
- Awards: Academy of Motion Picture Arts and Sciences award (1987)

Fritz Sennheiser (9 May 1912 – 17 May 2010) was a German inventor and entrepreneur who founded and served as chairman of Sennheiser Electronic, a manufacturer of audio equipment.

== Early life and education ==
Born in Berlin on 9 May 1912, Sennheiser grew up with an interest in radios and electronics. Sennheiser built a crystal radio when he was 11 years old after seeing an early radio.

He had originally hoped to become a landscape gardener, but chose instead to pursue electrical engineering at the Technische Hochschule Charlottenburg (now Technische Universität Berlin) and earned a Ph.D. from the Heinrich Hertz Institute in 1940. Sennheiser developed a reverberation unit that was used at the 1936 Summer Olympics in Berlin. He was responsible for sending coded messages for the German Army during World War II.

== Career ==
Sennheiser went into business for himself, and achieved early success with a tube voltmeter and microphone, both of which were purchased by Siemens. Later products in the 1950s included his invention of the shotgun microphone, early wireless microphones as well as its distinctive headphones that fit over the ear with flat, disc-shaped earpieces. Sennheiser stepped down as chairman in 1982, turning control of the business over to his son Jörg. By the time of his death, the family-owned business employed 2,100 people with manufacturing facilities in Germany, Ireland and the United States and had sales of $500 million in 2008.

== Later life ==
Sennheiser died at age 98 on 17 May 2010 (eight days after turning 98), and is survived by his son, daughter, three grandchildren and seven great-grandchildren.

== Recognition ==
The Academy of Motion Picture Arts and Sciences recognized Sennheiser in 1987 with its Scientific and Engineering Award for the development of the MKH 816 shotgun microphone. The Audio Engineering Society (AES) awarded Sennheiser a fellowship in 1976, an honorary membership in 1980, and its highest accolade, the AES Gold Medal, in 2002.
