= JZ Festival =

Chinese Jazz Music Festival

Debuting in 2005, JZ Festival has been recognized as the biggest jazz festival in China and the second biggest jazz festival in Asia. It is always held during a weekend in October. It was founded by Ren Yuqing, who owns JZ Club in Shanghai

The core of JZ Festival is jazz. But it covers many other music elements such as soul, blues, folk, pop, rock, electronic etc., which shows the spirit of jazz – improvisation and fusion. Plenty of international top musicians performed in JZ Festival, including Joss Stone, John Scofield, Pat Metheny, Ron Carter, Kenny Garrett, Dianne Reeves, Dee Dee Bridgewater and so on. Chinese famous music artists include Sandy Lam, Karen Mok, Cui Jian, Chang Csun Yuk, Mavis Fan etc. Since 2013, JZ Festival has been held in Beijing, Guangzhou, Dalian and Chongqing not just in home court Shanghai.
