= Greatest Hits + Five Unreleased =

Greatest hits album by Steve Perry
- Released: December 15, 1998; October 3, 2006 (Reissue)
- Recorded: 1977–1994
- Genre: Rock
- Length: 71:53
- Label: Columbia

Steve Perry chronology
For the Love of Strange Medicine (1994)	Greatest Hits + Five Unreleased (1998)	Traces (2018)

Singles from Greatest Hits + Five Unreleased
- 1. "I Stand Alone" Released: 1998; 2. "When You're in Love (For the First Time)" Released: 1998

Greatest Hits + Five Unreleased is a greatest hits compilation released by American singer/musician Steve Perry in 1998. The album contains hits from his two solo albums Street Talk (1984) and For the Love of Strange Medicine (1994) as well as several previously unreleased tracks from the abandoned solo project Against the Wall, as well as demos, b-sides and collaborations.

Against the Wall was originally going to be Perry's second solo album. It was shelved by a corporate executive during the time when Sony Music bought Columbia Records. Perry recalled the executive said he was unsure about the musical direction of the album. Apparently stunned at this response, Perry sought legal means to have the album completed and released otherwise but was unsuccessful. Sony ultimately did not release the album. Seven of these tracks were later released on this album and the others were released as bonus tracks on the 2006 re-issue of For the Love of Strange Medicine. He states in the album booklet that these songs all together should be called "Better Late Than Never."

== Track listing ==
No.	Title	Writer(s)	Origin	Length
1.	"Oh Sherrie"	Bill Cuomo, Randy Goodrum, Craig Krampf, Steve Perry	Street Talk, 1984	3:50
2.	"Foolish Heart"	Goodrum, Perry	Street Talk	3:40
3.	"She's Mine"	Goodrum, Perry	Street Talk	4:27
4.	"Strung Out"	Krampf, Perry, Billy Steele	Street Talk	3:46
5.	"Go Away"	Cuomo, Goodrum, Perry	Street Talk	4:08
6.	"When You're in Love (For the First Time)"	Goodrum, Perry	Previously unreleased track from Against the Wall	4:09
7.	"Against the Wall"	Goodrum, Michael Landau, Perry	Previously unreleased track from Against the Wall	4:44
8.	"Forever Right or Wrong [Love's Like a River]"	Cuomo, Lamont Dozier, Goodrum, Randy Jackson, Landau, Larrie Londin, Perry	Previously unreleased track from Against the Wall	4:32
9.	"Summer of Luv"	Cuomo, Goodrum, Jackson, Landau, Londin, Perry	Previously unreleased track from Against the Wall	4:26
10.	"Melody"	Goodrum, Perry	B-side to "Missing You" single, from Against the Wall	4:06
11.	"Once in a Lifetime, Girl"	Cuomo, Goodrum, Jackson, Landau, Londin, Rick Nowels, Perry	Previously unreleased track from Against the Wall	4:53
12.	"What Was"	Goodrum, Perry	Previously unreleased track from Against the Wall	3:58
13.	"You Better Wait"	Perry, Lincoln Brewster, Paul Taylor, Moyes Lucas, John Pierce, George Hawkins	For the Love of Strange Medicine, 1994	4:52
14.	"Missing You"	Perry, Tim Miner	For the Love of Strange Medicine	3:48
15.	"I Stand Alone"	Carole Bayer Sager, David Foster, Perry	Quest for Camelot: Music from the Motion Picture, 1998	3:43
16.	"It Won't Be You (Writing Demo)"	Tony Brock, Adrian Gurvitz, Perry	B-side to "Missing You" single, 1994	4:27
17.	"If You Need Me, Call Me (Demo)"	Stevey DeLacey, Krampf, Richard Michaels, Perry	Previously unreleased track from the Alien Project demo tape	4:22

2006 reissue bonus track
No.	Title	Writer(s)	Origin	Length
18.	"Don't Fight It" (with Kenny Loggins)	Loggins, Perry, Dean Pitchford	High Adventure, 1982	3:38
