= List of number-one singles of 1994 (Canada) =

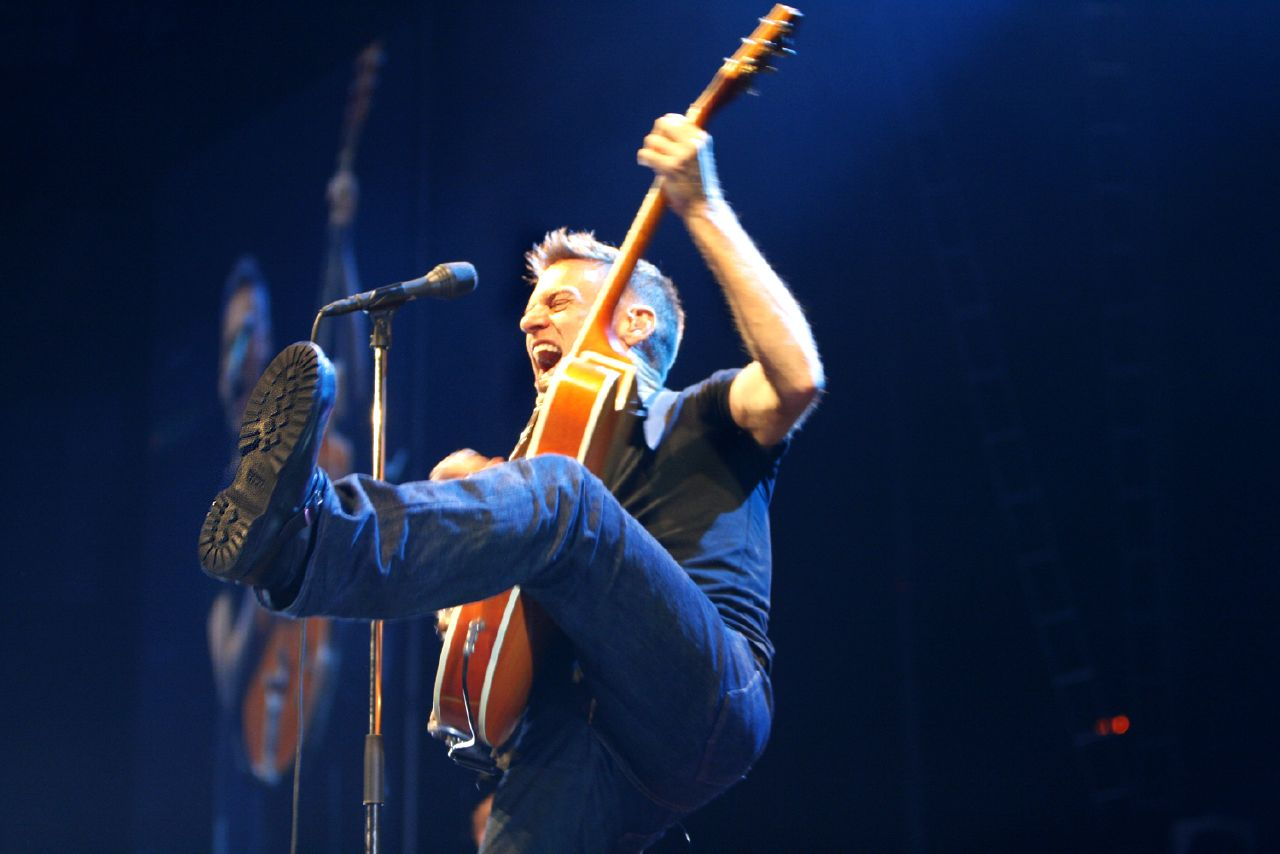
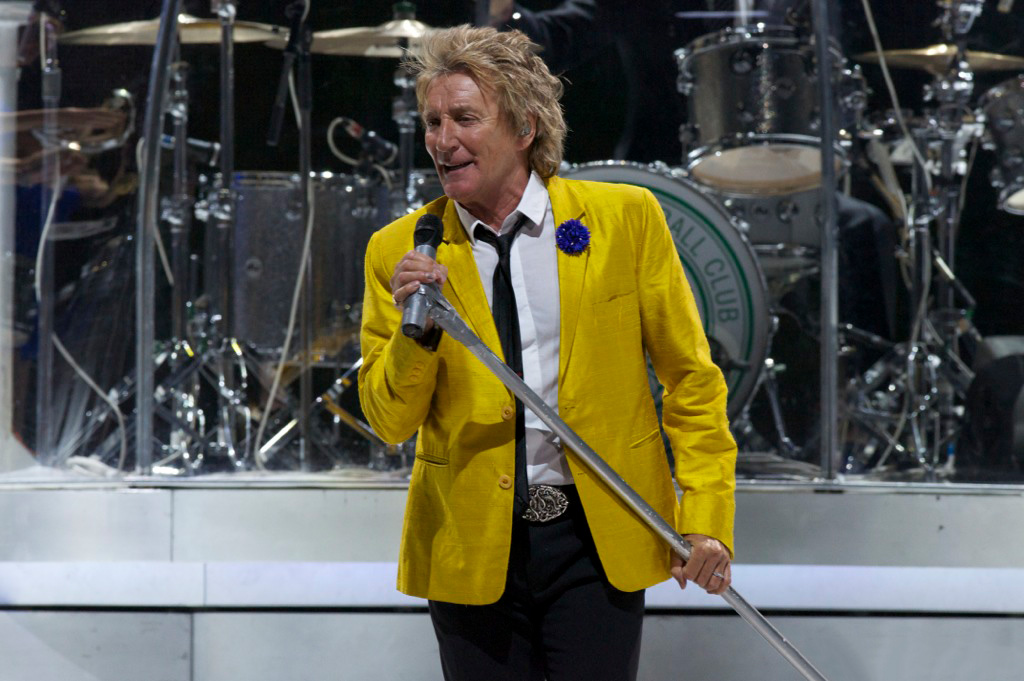
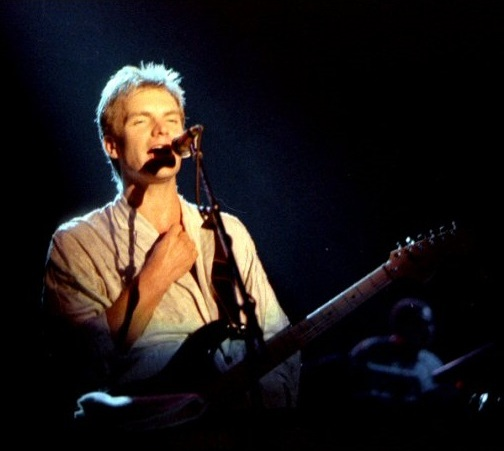
Bryan Adams (top), Rod Stewart (middle), and Sting (bottom) had the most successful single of 1994: "All for Love".

RPM was a Canadian magazine that published the best-performing singles of Canada from 1964 to 2000. During 1994, eighteen singles became number-one singles in Canada. Bryan Adams commenced the year with two consecutive number-one hits—"Please Forgive Me" and "All for Love", while Bon Jovi's "Always" was 1994's final number one. Eight artists attained the number-one spot for the first time this year: Bruce Springsteen, Counting Crows, Bonnie Raitt, All-4-One, Meshell Ndegeocello, Lisa Loeb, Boyz II Men, and Sheryl Crow. Bryan Adams, Ace of Base, and Madonna all obtained two number-one hits during 1994.

Bryan Adams and Celine Dion were the only Canadian acts to reach number one in 1994. Three songs spent five weeks at number one: "The Sign" by Ace of Base, "I'll Remember" by Madonna, and "All for Love" by Bryan Adams, Rod Stewart, and Sting. Of these three songs, the latter was the best-performing single of Canada this year. Madonna peaked atop the chart for eight weeks with "I'll Remember" and "Secret", and Ace of Base stayed six weeks at number one with "The Sign" and "Don't Turn Around". Elton John, Sheryl Crow, and Bon Jovi each stayed four weeks at number one, and those who stayed at the top for three weeks were Bonnie Raitt, All-4-One, John Mellencamp and Meshell Ndegeocello, and Boyz II Men.

Key
† Indicates best-performing single of 1994

== Chart history ==
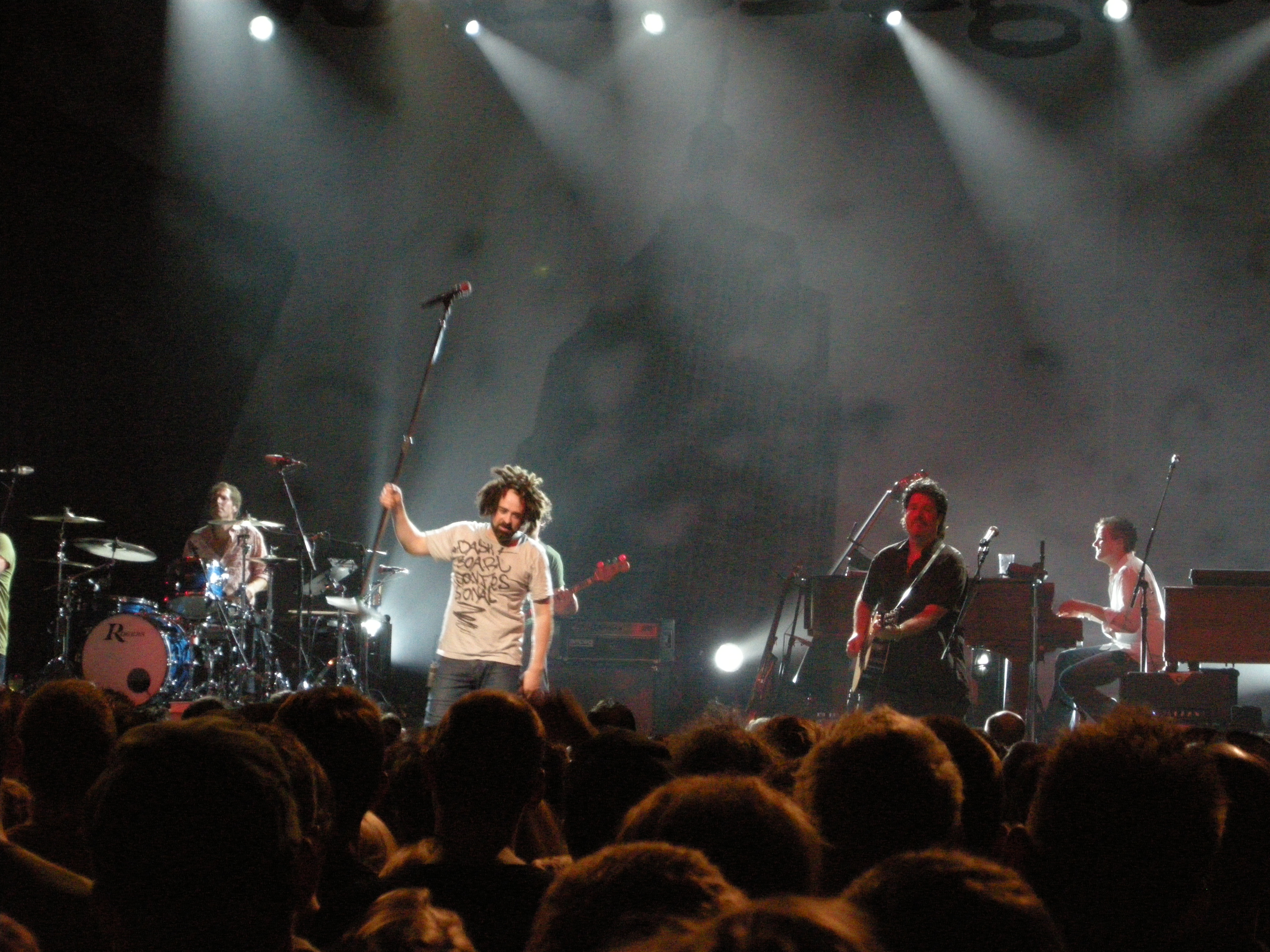
Counting Crows had a one-week stay at number one with their song "Mr. Jones".

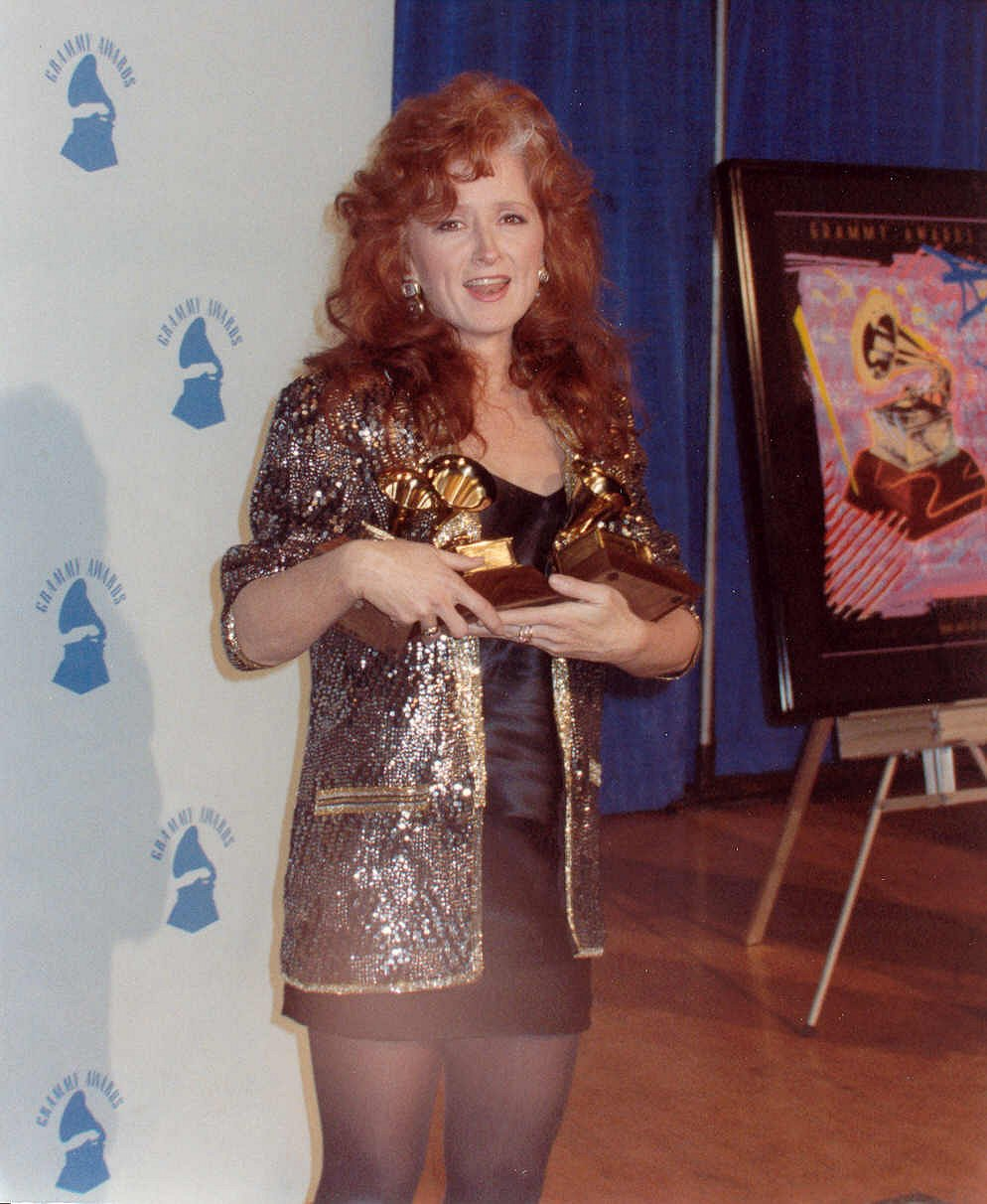
American singer Bonnie Raitt reached number one with "Love Sneakin' Up On You" and stayed there for three weeks.

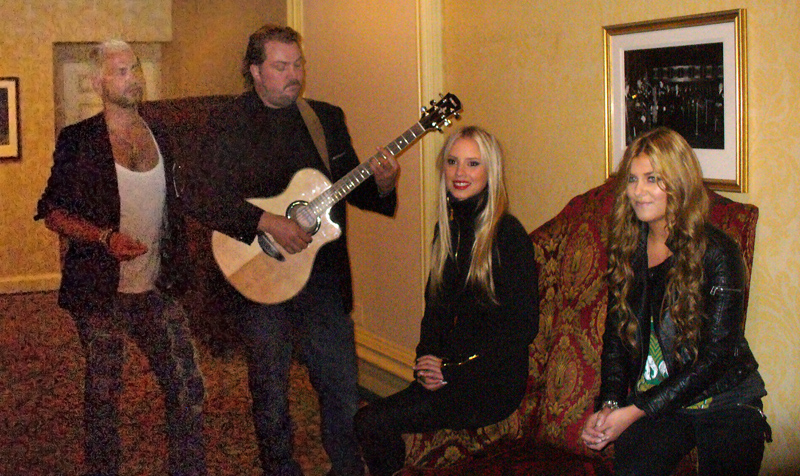
Swedish band Ace of Base earned their second and third Canadian number-one hits in 1994: "The Sign" and "Don't Turn Around".

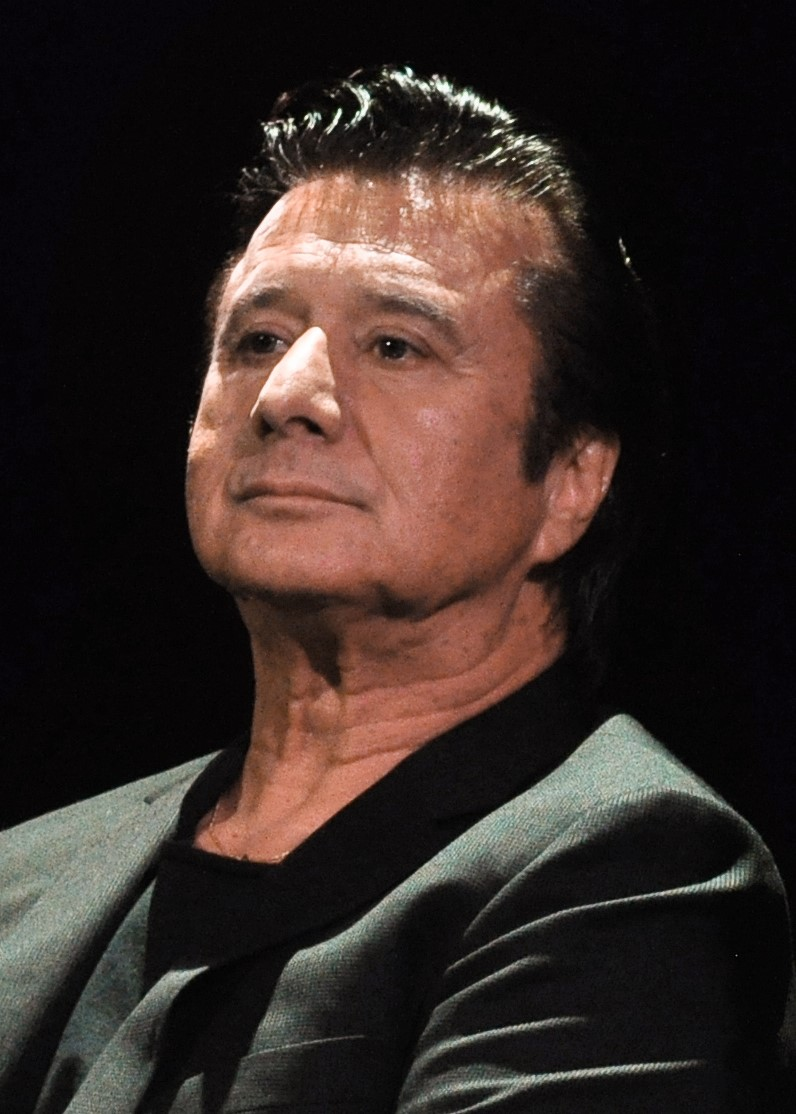
Journey lead singer Steve Perry topped the chart for one week with "You Better Wait".

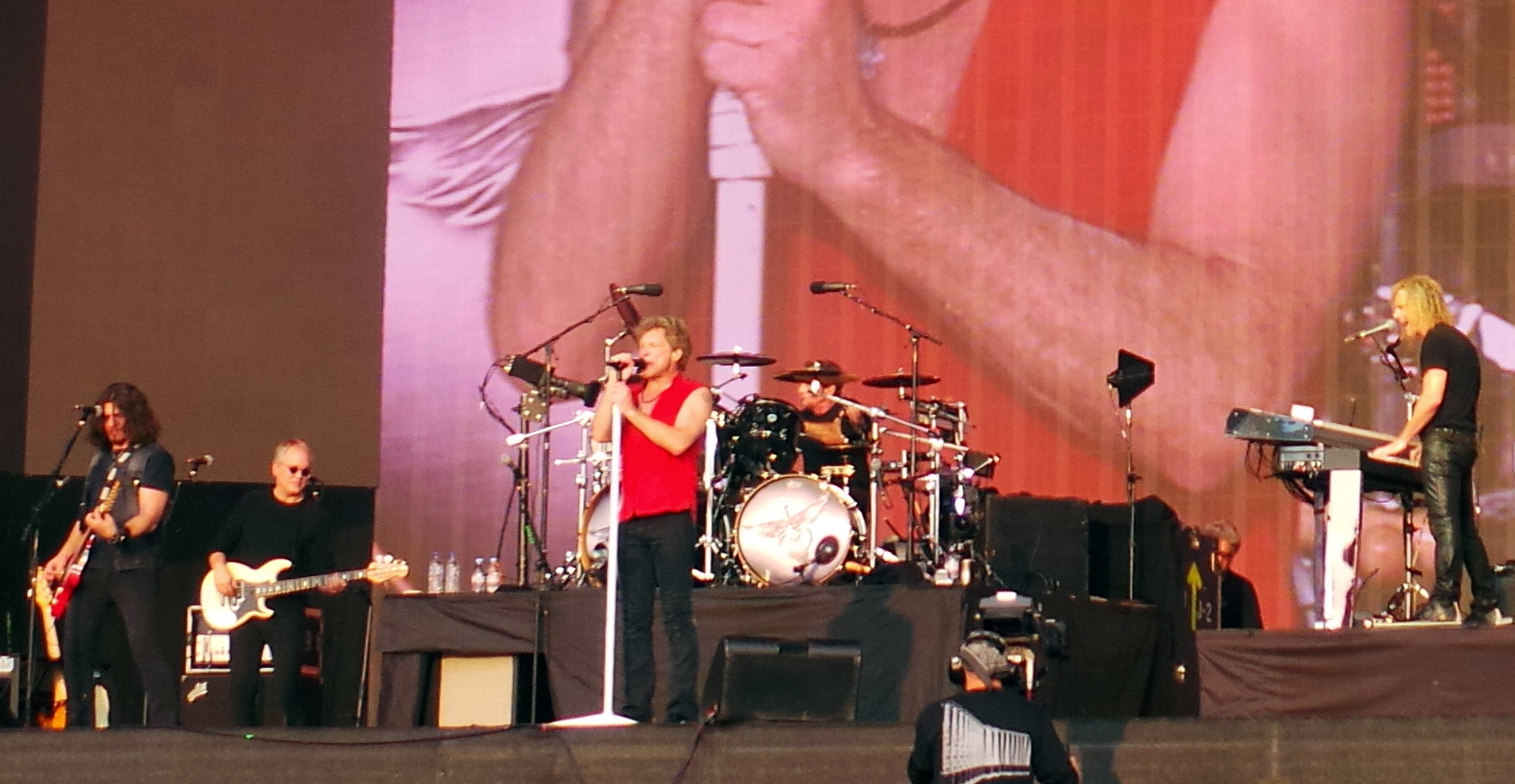
Bon Jovi remained at the number-one spot into 1995 with "Always", totalling four weeks at number one in 1994.

Issue date	Song	Artist	Reference
3 January (Note: Due to a week's break in publication over the 1993/1994 New Year period, the week of 3 January is inferred.)	"Please Forgive Me"	Bryan Adams	
10 January	"Please Forgive Me"	Bryan Adams	
17 January	"All for Love"†	Bryan Adams, Rod Stewart and Sting	
24 January	"All for Love"†	Bryan Adams, Rod Stewart and Sting	
31 January	"All for Love"†	Bryan Adams, Rod Stewart and Sting	
7 February	"All for Love"†	Bryan Adams, Rod Stewart and Sting	
14 February	"All for Love"†	Bryan Adams, Rod Stewart and Sting	
21 February	"The Power of Love"	Celine Dion	
28 February	"The Power of Love"	Celine Dion	
7 March	"Streets of Philadelphia"	Bruce Springsteen	
14 March	"Mr. Jones"	Counting Crows	
21 March	"The Sign"	Ace of Base	
28 March	"The Sign"	Ace of Base	
4 April	"The Sign"	Ace of Base	
11 April	"The Sign"	Ace of Base	
18 April	"The Sign"	Ace of Base	
25 April	"Love Sneakin' Up On You"	Bonnie Raitt	
2 May	"Love Sneakin' Up On You"	Bonnie Raitt	
9 May	"Love Sneakin' Up On You"	Bonnie Raitt	
16 May	"I'll Remember"	Madonna	
23 May	"I'll Remember"	Madonna	
30 May	"I'll Remember"	Madonna	
6 June	"I'll Remember"	Madonna	
13 June	"I'll Remember"	Madonna	
20 June	"I Swear"	All-4-One	
27 June	"I Swear"	All-4-One	
4 July	"I Swear"	All-4-One	
11 July	"Don't Turn Around"	Ace of Base	
18 July	"Wild Night"	John Mellencamp and Meshell Ndegeocello	
25 July	"Wild Night"	John Mellencamp and Meshell Ndegeocello	
1 August	"Wild Night"	John Mellencamp and Meshell Ndegeocello	
8 August	"Can You Feel the Love Tonight"	Elton John	
15 August	"Can You Feel the Love Tonight"	Elton John	
22 August	"Can You Feel the Love Tonight"	Elton John	
29 August	"Can You Feel the Love Tonight"	Elton John	
5 September	"Stay (I Missed You)"	Lisa Loeb and Nine Stories	
12 September	"Stay (I Missed You)"	Lisa Loeb and Nine Stories	
19 September	"You Better Wait"	Steve Perry	
26 September	"I'll Make Love to You"	Boyz II Men	
3 October	"I'll Make Love to You"	Boyz II Men	
10 October	"All I Wanna Do"	Sheryl Crow	
17 October	"All I Wanna Do"	Sheryl Crow	
24 October	"All I Wanna Do"	Sheryl Crow	
31 October	"All I Wanna Do"	Sheryl Crow	
7 November	"I'll Make Love to You"	Boyz II Men	
14 November	"Secret"	Madonna	
21 November	"Secret"	Madonna	
28 November	"Secret"	Madonna	
5 December	"Always"	Bon Jovi	
12 December	"Always"	Bon Jovi	
19 December	"Always"	Bon Jovi	
26 December (Note: Due to a two-week break in publication over the 1994/1995 Christmas/New Year period, the week of 26 December is inferred.)	"Always"	Bon Jovi	

== See also ==
- 1994 in music
- List of Billboard Hot 100 number ones of 1994 (United States)
- List of number-one singles from the 1990s (New Zealand)
