= Missing You (Steve Perry song) =

Single by Steve Perry

from the album For the Love of Strange Medicine
- Released: August 1994
- Length: 3:48
- Label: Columbia
- Songwriter(s): Tim Miner, Steve Perry

Steve Perry singles chronology
"You Better Wait" (1994)	"Missing You" (1994)	"No Erasin'" (2018)

Music video
- "Missing You" on YouTube

"Missing You" is a song by Steve Perry from his album For the Love of Strange Medicine. The song peaked at number 74 on the Billboard Hot 100 in 1994. The song, along with some of its B-sides, later appeared on Perry's compilation album Greatest Hits + Five Unreleased.

== Track listing ==
1. "Missing You" (Steve Perry, Tim Miner) - 3:48
2. "Melody" (Perry, Randy Goodrum) - 4:17
3. "What Was" (Demo) (Perry, Goodrum) - 3:58
4. "It Won't Be You" (Perry, Tony Brock, Adrian Gurvitz) - 3:58
5. "Missing You" (Writing Session) (Steve Perry, Tim Miner) - 4:35
