= Traces (Steve Perry album) =

Studio album by Steve Perry
- Released: October 5, 2018
- Recorded: May 2015–2018
- Studio: Love Box (Hollywood); Capitol Studios (Hollywood); EastWest Studios (Hollywood)
- Genre: AOR, pop rock
- Length: 40:13 (standard edition); 59:15 (deluxe edition)
- Label: Fantasy
- Producer: Steve Perry; Thom Flowers; Jason Lee

Steve Perry chronology
Greatest Hits + Five Unreleased (1998)	Traces (2018)	The Season (2021)

Singles from Traces
- 1. "No Erasin'" Released: August 14, 2018; 2. "No More Cryin'" Released: September 4, 2018; 3. "We're Still Here" Released: September 20, 2018; 4. "Sun Shines Gray (Alternate mix)" Released: July 19, 2019

Traces is the third solo studio album by the American singer and songwriter Steve Perry. It was released on October 5, 2018, by Fantasy Records. It was his first solo album in 24 years, after For the Love of Strange Medicine in 1994, his first appearance on a studio album since his last appearance with Journey on their 1996 album Trial by Fire and his first release of new music since his contributions to the 1998 film Quest for Camelot.

It is Perry's first solo top 10 Billboard album, and his first top 40 album in the UK as a solo artist.

== Background ==
After leaving Journey in 1998, Perry withdrew from the music industry (apart from a handful of low-key guest appearances over the years) for "many reasons, but mainly my love for music had suddenly left me". His passion was reignited after his girlfriend, Kellie Nash, died from cancer in December 2012, and he began recording Traces in May 2015.

== Release and promotion ==
The first single from the album, "No Erasin'", was released on August 14, 2018, accompanied by a performance music video. It peaked at number 18 on the US Adult Contemporary chart, number 38 on the Hot Rock Songs chart and number 17 on the Rock Digital Song Sales chart.

Two more performance videos were released, "No More Cryin'" on September 4, 2018, and "We're Still Here" on September 20, 2018. A second video for "We're Still Here", Perry's first "official" music video in 25 years, was released on March 22, 2019. The song peaked at number 14 on the Adult Contemporary chart in the week of April 27, 2019.

On September 24, 2018, Perry participated in a Facebook Live event at noon PDT. The 15-minute webcast focused on the making of the album.

On March 15, 2019, the expanded edition, which was previously exclusive to Target stores, was released worldwide.

On July 19, 2019, a remixed version of "Sun Shines Gray" was released as the fourth single from the album. On December 4, 2020, a remixed album of songs from Traces was released.

== Critical reception ==
The album received a positive reception from critics. Andrew McNeice of Melodicrock rated the album a 92/100, calling it, "a very fine record", and that it is "Immaculately produced and constructed, with equally impressive musical performances by the band" and "soulful harmonies" by Perry.

CrypticRock.com gave the album 5/5 stars and called it, "All in all, Traces is a near flawless return for Steve Perry."

Get Ready to Rock Me gave the album 4.5 out of 5 stars and said, "We never thought we'd get another full album from Steve Perry, thankfully we have in Traces, which is a master class in AOR and soulful edged pop."

== Track listing ==
No.	Title	Writer(s)	Length
1.	"No Erasin'"	Steve Perry; David Spreng	4:07
2.	"We're Still Here"	Perry; Brian West	4:06
3.	"Most of All"	Perry; Randy Goodrum	4:21
4.	"No More Cryin'"	Perry; Dan Wilson	4:28
5.	"In the Rain"	Perry; Spreng	4:07
6.	"Sun Shines Gray" (featuring John 5)	Perry; John 5; Thom Flowers	3:55
7.	"You Belong to Me"	Perry; Barry Eastmond	4:05
8.	"Easy to Love"	Perry; Flowers	4:02
9.	"I Need You" (The Beatles cover)	George Harrison	2:58
10.	"We Fly"	Perry; Jeff Babko	3:56

US Target deluxe edition bonus tracks
No.	Title	Writer(s)	Length
11.	"October in New York"	Perry; Patrick Willams; Jason Lee	4:04
12.	"Angel Eyes"	Perry	4:19
13.	"Call on Me"	Perry	4:11
14.	"Could We Be Somethin' Again"	Perry	3:17
15.	"Blue Jays Fly"	Perry	2:58

Traces (Alternative Versions and Sketches) track listing
No.	Title	Length
1.	"Most of All (Radio Mix)"	4:25
2.	"No Erasin' (Acoustic)"	4:03
3.	"I Need You (Acoustic)"	2:58
4.	"No More Cryin' (Acoustic)"	4:28
5.	"Most of All (Stripped)"	4:32
6.	"We’re Still Here (Acoustic)"	3:56
7.	"You Belong to Me (Stripped)"	4:06
8.	"Sun Shines Gray (Acoustic)"	3:44

== Personnel ==
- Steve Perry – vocals, backing vocals (1–14), guitars (1, 14), bass (1, 2, 4–6, 10, 13), strings (1, 3, 6, 12), programming (2, 3, 8, 9, 13, 14), orchestra (4), synthesizers (9, 12, 14), orchestration (13), all instruments (15)
- Tommy King – acoustic piano (1, 7, 12), Hammond organ (1, 7, 12)
- Roger Joseph Manning Jr. – synthesizers (1, 3)
- Dallas Kruse – synthesizers (1, 5, 10, 12), strings (1), acoustic piano (3, 5), Hammond organ (4, 8, 9), electric piano (9), vibraphone (12)
- Brian West – programming (2), guitars (2)
- Randy Goodrum – acoustic piano (3)
- Booker T. Jones – Hammond organ (4)
- Kyle Moorman – programming (6)
- Jeff Babko – acoustic piano (10)
- Tom Ranier – acoustic piano (11)
- Thom Flowers – guitars (1–10)
- David Spreng – guitars (1)
- Dan Wilson – guitars (4)
- John 5 – guitars (6)
- Tim Pierce – guitars (12)
- Michael Sanford – guitars (14)
- Devin Hoffman – bass (1, 2, 4, 6, 14), guitars (13, 14)
- Nathan East – bass (3, 12)
- Travis Carlton – bass (7)
- Pino Palladino – bass (8, 9)
- Chuck Berghofer – rhythm bass (11)
- Josh Freese – drums (1, 6)
- Vinnie Colaiuta – drums (2–4, 7–9, 11, 13)
- Steve Ferrone – drums (12, 14)
- Dan Greco – percussion (11)
- Steve Richards – cello (3)
- The Steve Perry Philharmonic Orchestra – orchestra (4)
- Dylan Hart – horns (5, 7)
- Teag Reaves – horns (5, 7)
- Douglas Tornquist – tuba (7)
- Sherree Brown – backing vocals (2)
- Lynn Mabry – backing vocals (2)
- Katie Hampton – backing vocals (12)
- Aubrey Logan – backing vocals (12)
- Kellie Nash – love and laughter (13)

Orchestra (Tracks 2, 5 & 7)

- David Campbell – orchestrations, conductor
- Steve Perry – orchestrations
- Suzie Katayama – cello, string contractor
- Paula Hochhalter – cello
- Steve Richards – cello
- Andrew Duckles – viola
- Luke Maurer – viola
- Charlie Bisharat – violin
- Sara Parkins – violin
- Michele Richards – violin

The Patrick Willams Orchestra (Track 11)

- Joe Soldo – orchestra contractor
- Terry Woodson – music preparation
- Tim Eckert – arco bass
- Alisha Bauer – cello
- Matt Cooker – cello
- Paula Hochhalter – cello
- Tina Soule – cello
- Scott Hosfeld – viola
- Harry Shirinian – viola
- Ray Tischer – viola
- Rodney Wirtz – viola
- Erik Arvinder – violin
- Charlie Bisharat – violin
- Ron Clark – violin
- Kevin Connolly – violin
- Joel Derouin – violin
- Lisa Dondlinger – violin
- Johana Krejci – violin
- Ralph Morrison – violin, concertmaster
- Jennifer Munday – violin
- Cynthia Moussas – violin
- Katia Popov – violin
- Julie Rogers – violin
- Neil Samples – violin
- Jenny Takamatsu – violin
- Irina Voloshina – violin
- Dynell Weber – violin

=== Production ===
- Steve Perry – producer, recording, mixing, cover design, concept, photography
- Thom Flowers – co-producer, recording, mixing, photography
- Jason Lee – co-producer (11)
- Steve Churchyard – string recording (2, 3, 7)
- Al Schmitt – string recording (11)
- Steve Genewick – string recording assistant (11)
- Bob Ludwig – mastering at Gateway Mastering (Portland, Maine)
- Sean McGee – vinyl mastering at Abbey Road Studios (London, UK)
- Jeff Wack – cover artwork, cover design, concept
- Myriam Santos – photography
- Emma Holley – photography
- Direct Management Group – management

== Charts ==
=== Weekly charts ===
Chart (2018)	Peak position
Austrian Albums (Ö3 Austria)	73
Belgian Albums (Ultratop Flanders)	116
Canadian Albums (Billboard)	35
German Albums (Offizielle Top 100)	45
Japanese Albums (Oricon)	29
Scottish Albums (OCC)	17
Swiss Albums (Schweizer Hitparade)	30
UK Albums (OCC)	40
US Billboard 200	6
US Top Rock Albums (Billboard)	2

=== Year-end charts ===
Chart (2018)	Position
US Top Rock Albums (Billboard)	59
