= The Season (Steve Perry album) =

Studio album by Steve Perry
- Released: November 5, 2021
- Recorded: 2021
- Studio: Lovebox Studios (Hollywood)
- Genre: Christmas
- Length: 25:35 (standard edition); 32:46 (deluxe edition); 52:05 (The Season 3)
- Labels: Fantasy (standard edition); Dark Horse Records (The Season 3)
- Producers: Steve Perry; Thom Flowers

Steve Perry chronology
Traces (2018)	The Season (2021)

The Season is the fourth studio album by former Journey singer Steve Perry and his first Christmas album. It was released on November 5, 2021, by Fantasy Records.

It debuted at number 6 on the Billboard Top Album Sales chart.

A Digital Deluxe Edition with 2 additional songs was released on October 28, 2022.

A third version, titled The Season 3, and released on Dark Horse Records on November 8, 2024, includes 6 new songs.

== Critical reception ==
Louder gave the album two and a half stars, saying, "if you’re hoping to hear any trace of the rock stylings that made Perry famous, then it’s probably best skip this gooey, Buble-esque affair."

RIFF Magazine said, "Does the world need a Steve Perry Christmas record? Beyond the shadow of any human doubt … no. It doesn’t."

== Track listing ==
No.	Title	Length
1.	"The Christmas Song"	3:31
2.	"I'll Be Home for Christmas"	2:46
3.	"Auld Lang Syne"	2:06
4.	"Winter Wonderland"	3:19
5.	"What Are You Doing New Year's Eve"	3:56
6.	"Santa Claus Is Coming to Town"	3:02
7.	"Silver Bells"	5:03
8.	"Have Yourself a Merry Little Christmas"	1:55

Deluxe Edition
No.	Title	Length
1.	"Maybe This Year"	3:37
2.	"This Christmas"	3:34
3.	"The Christmas Song"	3:31
4.	"I'll Be Home for Christmas"	2:46
5.	"Auld Lang Syne"	2:06
6.	"Winter Wonderland"	3:19
7.	"What Are You Doing New Year's Eve"	3:56
8.	"Santa Claus Is Coming to Town"	3:02
9.	"Silver Bells"	5:03
10.	"Have Yourself a Merry Little Christmas"	1:55

The Season 3
No.	Title	Length
1.	"What a Wonderful World"	4:01
2.	"The Christmas Song"	3:30
3.	"Santa Claus Is Coming to Town"	3:04
4.	"This Christmas"	3:23
5.	"Jingle Bell Rock"	3:18
6.	"Call Me Irresponsible"	3:05
7.	"What Are You Doing New Year's Eve"	3:57
8.	"Auld Lang Syne"	2:05
9.	"Silver Bells"	5:03
10.	"I'll Be Home for Christmas"	2:45
11.	"Let It Snow"	2:33
12.	"Maybe This Year"	3:37
13.	"Winter Wonderland"	3:20
14.	"Rudolph the Red-Nosed Reindeer"	3:06
15.	"Have Yourself a Merry Little Christmas"	1:55
16.	"'Twas the Night Before Christmas"	3:23

== Personnel ==
Credits for The Season adapted from liner notes.

=== Musicians ===
- Steve Perry – lead and backing vocals
- Dallas Kruse – piano, bass, synth, backing vocals
- Vinnie Colaiuta – drums

=== Technical ===
- Steve Perry – additional orchestration, mixing
- Dallas Kruse – drum programming
- Thom Flowers – engineering, mixing, co-production
- Adam Ayan – mastering
- Jeff Wack – artwork, design

== Charts ==
Chart (2021)	Peak position
United States Billboard Top Holiday Albums	4
United States Billboard Top Album Sales	6
United States Billboard Independent Albums	16
United States Billboard Top Vinyl Albums	21
United States Billboard 200	80
