= In the Gray of the Morning =

Studio album by Gene Cotton
- Released: 1973
- Genres: Pop; rock; folk; country
- Length: 30:49
- Label: Myrrh
- Producer: Gene Cotton

Gene Cotton chronology
Peace (1970)	In the Gray of the Morning (1973)	Liberty (1974)

Singles from In the Gray of the Morning
- 1. "American Indian Blues" Released: 1974; 2. "Lean on One Another"

In the Gray of the Morning is the fourth studio album released by American pop and folk singer-songwriter Gene Cotton. It was released in 1973 on Myrrh. Its lead-off singles included “American Indian Blues” and “Lean on One Another”.

After getting married and moving around the country, Cotton recorded "In the Gray of the Morning" and made efforts to promote the album himself. On a promotion stop, he met Billy Ray Hearn, A&R director of Myrrh Records, who liked the record and explained that Myrhh was expanding into secular and gospel music, after which Cotton sold him the master for his "In the Gray of the Morning" album. Cotton continued to promote the album by performing the songs live in concert.

== Critical reception ==
Professional ratings
Review scores
Source	Rating
AllMusic	2/5 stars

The album received positive reviews from music critics. Jack Burke of the La Crosse Tribune called it "blues and songs of togetherness and warmth". D.W. of the Ealing and Acton Gazette was impressed by Cotton’s "gentle style which means words come over clearly" commending the "fine tracks". The Bristol Herald Courier said the album "speaks of love, brotherhood, and reaching out to one another". In its review of the album, Planet Mellotron said "it's very much an album of its time". The Elizabethton Star described Cotton's music as "'pleasing' and his lyrics 'worth remembering'".

== Track listing ==
No.	Title	Writer(s)	Length
1.	"Question"	Justin Hayward	2:45
2.	"Apathy"	Charlie Crino	3:05
3.	"American Indian Blues"	Jerry Wasley	2:16
4.	"Blessed"	Billie Hughes	2:36
5.	"Opry House Blues"	Gene Cotton	2:40
6.	"Lean On One Another"	Gene Cotton	3:15
7.	"Help You Smile"	Charlie Crino	2:00
8.	"Lessons Of History"	Gene Cotton	3:13
9.	"When the Ship Comes In"	Bob Dylan
Total length:			27:10

== Personnel ==
- Gene Cotton – lead and backing vocals, acoustic guitar
- Pete Wade - acoustic guitar
- Billy Sanford - acoustic guitar, electric guitar
- Jack Williams – bass guitar
- Jerry Wasley – bass guitar
- Joe Allen – bass guitar
- Kenny Buttrey – drums
- Jerry Carrigan – drums, congas
- Charlie Crino – grand piano
- Beegie Cruser - grand piano, electric piano, organ
- Weldon Myrick – steel guitar

== Production ==
- Charlie Tallent – producer
