= Before My Heart Finds Out =

Single by Gene Cotton

from the album Save the Dancer
- B-side: "Like a Sunday in Salem"
- Released: January 1978
- Recorded: 1977
- Label: Ariola Am. 7675
- Songwriter: Randy Goodrum
- Producer: Steven A. Gibson

Gene Cotton singles chronology
"You've Got Me Runnin'" (1977)	"Before My Heart Finds Out" (1978)	"You're a Part of Me" (1978)

"Before My Heart Finds Out" is a 1978 single and hit song by Gene Cotton. It was the debut single from his eighth album, Save the Dancer.

The song became his greatest hit, reaching number 23 on the US Billboard Hot 100 and spending three weeks at number 17 in Canada. It also reached number 16 on the US Cash Box Top 100.

"Before My Heart Finds Out" was a much bigger hit on the Adult Contemporary charts, peaking at number 3 in the US and number 4 in Canada. On the US AC chart, it spent six weeks at number three, in addition to four weeks at number four.

Nine months later, the B-side, "Like a Sunday in Salem (The Amos & Andy Song)", was released as an A-side single, and became a US hit, reaching number 40.

== Chart performance ==
=== Weekly charts ===
Chart (1978)	Peak position
Canadian RPM Top Singles	17
Canadian RPM Adult Contemporary	4
US Billboard Hot 100	23
US Billboard Adult Contemporary	3
US Cash Box Top 100	16

=== Year-end charts ===
Chart (1978)	Rank
Canada	125
US (Joel Whitburn's Pop Annual)	149
