= For the Love of Strange Medicine =

Studio album by Steve Perry
- Released: July 19, 1994
- Recorded: 1993
- Studios: Ocean Way Recording (Hollywood, California) One On One Studios (Hollywood, California) The Record Plant (Los Angeles, California) The Enterprise (Burbank, California) American Recording Studios (Woodland Hills, California) Aire L.A. Studios (Glendale, California) Knightlight Studios (Dallas, Texas) Dallas Sound Lab (Dallas, Texas) The Hit Factory (New York City, New York)
- Genre: Rock
- Length: 53:02
- Label: Columbia
- Producers: James "Jimbo" Barton; Steve Perry; Tim Miner

Steve Perry chronology
Street Talk (1984)	For the Love of Strange Medicine (1994)	Greatest Hits + Five Unreleased (1998)

Singles from For the Love of Strange Medicine
- 1. "You Better Wait" Released: June 28, 1994; 2. "Missing You" Released: August 1994; 3. "Young Hearts Forever" Released: 1994; 4. "Anyway" Released: 1994

Professional ratings
Review scores
Source	Rating
AllMusic	2/5 stars

For the Love of Strange Medicine is the second solo studio album by American singer and songwriter Steve Perry, released on July 19, 1994, through Columbia Records. The album came after a lengthy eight-year hiatus following the breakup of his band Journey. The first single from the album, "You Better Wait", received radio airplay, reaching the top 10 on the Billboard Mainstream Rock chart and peaking at No. 29 on the Billboard Hot 100. The album was certified gold by the RIAA in September 1994 and was followed by a tour from 1994 to 1995.

The song "Young Hearts Forever" was written by Perry as a tribute to his late friend, Thin Lizzy frontman Phil Lynott, who died in 1986.

== Background ==
Journey released their ninth studio album Raised on Radio in 1986, which was Perry's seventh album as lead singer. The band subsequently went on a hiatus in 1987. After the split, Perry "didn't feel the passion" for writing and recording music, but eventually began writing songs for the album with musicians Lincoln Brewster, Paul Taylor, and Moyes Lucas.

== Track listing ==
Standard version
No.	Title	Writer(s)	Producer(s)	Length
1.	"You Better Wait"	Steve Perry; Lincoln Brewster; Paul Taylor; Moyes Lucas; John Pierce; George Hawkins	James "Jimbo" Barton	4:51
2.	"Young Hearts Forever"	Perry; Clif Magness	Barton	4:43
3.	"I Am"	Perry; Taylor; Brewster	Barton	4:54
4.	"Stand Up (Before It's Too Late)"	Perry; Brewster; Taylor; Lucas; Larry Kimpel	Barton	4:49
5.	"For the Love of Strange Medicine"	Perry; Brewster; Taylor; Lucas	Barton; Perry	5:52
6.	"Donna Please"	Perry; Taylor; Stephen Bishop	Barton; Perry	4:02
7.	"Listen to Your Heart"	Perry; Taylor; Brewster; Lucas	Barton	3:31
8.	"Tuesday Heartache"	Perry; Magness; Taylor; Brewster; Lucas	Barton	6:00
9.	"Missing You"	Perry; Tim Miner	Perry; Miner	3:48
10.	"Somewhere There's Hope"	Perry; Taylor; Brewster; Lucas	Barton	6:05
11.	"Anyway"	Perry	Perry; Miner	4:20

2006 re-release (bonus tracks)
No.	Title	Writer(s)	Producer(s)	Length
12.	"If You Need Me, Call Me"	Perry; Craig Krampf; Richard Michaels Haddad; Steve DeLacey	Perry; Randy Goodrum	5:50
13.	"One More Time"	Perry; Brewster	Perry	3:32
14.	"Can't Stop"	Perry; Goodrum; Michael Landau	Perry; Goodrum	4:08
15.	"Friends of Mine"	Perry; Josh Leo; Goodrum; Krampf	Perry, Goodrum	3:30
16.	"Missing You" (Live in San Francisco 12/9/94)	Perry; Miner		4:13

Notes (2006 re-release)

- "If You Need Me, Call Me" is a 1994 re-recording of a song by Perry's pre-Journey band, Alien Project.
- "One More Time" is a previously unreleased out take from 1994.
- "Can't Stop" and "Friends of Mine" are previously unreleased tracks from the 1988 unreleased Against the Wall album.

== Personnel ==
- Steve Perry – vocals, backing vocals
- Paul Taylor – keyboards (1–8, 10), backing vocals (1), synthesizers (11)
- Tim Miner – keyboards (9), acoustic piano (9, 11), bass (9, 11), backing vocals (9, 11)
- Lincoln Brewster – guitars (1–8, 10), backing vocals (1)
- Michael Landau – guitars (11)
- Larry Kimpel – bass (1, 2, 4, 10)
- Mike Porcaro – bass (2, 3, 5–7)
- Moyes Lucas – drums (1–8, 10, 11), backing vocals (1, 7)
- Jeremy Lubbock – string arrangements and string conductor (3)
- James "Jimbo" Barton – string arrangements (3)
- Phil Brown – string arrangements (3), bass (8)
- Larry Dalton – string arrangements and conductor (9)
- Dallas Symphony Orchestra – strings (9)
- Alexander Brown – backing vocals (4, 10)
- Carmen Carter – backing vocals (4, 10)
- Jean McClain – backing vocals (4, 10)

=== Production ===
- Randy Jackson – A&R direction
- James "Jimbo" Barton – producer (1–8, 10), engineer (1–8, 10)
- Steve Perry – producer (5, 6, 9, 11)
- Tim Miner – producer (9, 11)
- Niko Bolas – mixing (1, 2, 6)
- David Reitzas – string recording (3)
- Craig Burbidge – mixing (3–5, 7–11), engineer (11)
- Tim Kimsey – engineer (9)
- Frank Salazar – engineer (9)
- Bill Cooper – second engineer
- Devin Foutz – second engineer
- Manny Marroquin – second engineer
- Kyle Ross – second engineer
- Rail Rogut – second engineer
- Ulrich Wild – second engineer
- Brian Lee – digital editing
- Bob Ludwig – mastering
- Gateway Mastering (Portland, Maine) – editing and mastering location
- Phil Brown – production assistant (1–4, 7, 8, 10)
- Diarmuid Quinn – product manager
- Dave Coleman – art direction
- Reisig & Taylor – photography
- Bob Cavallo and Scott Welch with Third Rail Management – management

== Charts ==
Chart (1994)	Peak position
Canada Top Albums/CDs (RPM)	63
German Albums (Offizielle Top 100)	91
Swedish Albums (Sverigetopplistan)	23
Swiss Albums (Schweizer Hitparade)	44
UK Albums (Official Charts)	64
US Billboard 200	15

== Certifications ==
Region	Certification	Certified units/sales
United States (RIAA)	Gold	500,000^{^}
^{^} Shipments figures based on certification alone.
