= Street Talk =

Studio album by Steve Perry
- Released: April 5, 1984
- Studios: Record One (Los Angeles, California)
- Genre: AOR
- Length: 39:20
- Label: Columbia
- Producer: Steve Perry

Steve Perry chronology
Street Talk (1984)	For the Love of Strange Medicine (1994)

Professional ratings
Review scores
Source	Rating
AllMusic	4/5 stars
Encyclopedia of Popular Music	4/5 stars
The Rolling Stone Album Guide	2.5/5 stars
The Village Voice	C

Street Talk is Steve Perry's first solo studio album, released on April 5, 1984.

Street Talk contains Perry's biggest hit as a solo artist, "Oh Sherrie", written for his then-girlfriend Sherrie Swafford. The song hit #3 on the Billboard Hot 100 and #1 on Billboard's Rock chart, and the accompanying music video (also featuring Swafford) was a hit on MTV. Other singles included "Foolish Heart" (peaked at #18), "She's Mine" (peaked at #21), and "Strung Out" (peaked at #40).

There were a number of nods to Perry's pre-Journey band Alien Project on this album—in fact, that band was originally going to be called Street Talk. In the liner notes, Perry dedicates the album to Richard Michaels (the bassist for Alien Project). Also, drummer Craig Krampf was a member of Alien Project later in the 1970s.

In addition to launching Perry's solo career, the cover photo for Street Talk served as a career launchpad for music photographer John Scarpati, who met Perry during the album's recording sessions at a studio in Sherman Oaks.

Street Talk is certified as 2× Platinum (2,000,000) in sales by the RIAA.

== Track listing ==
All tracks written by Steve Perry with additional writers noted

Side one
No.	Title	Writer(s)	Length
1.	"Oh Sherrie"	Bill Cuomo, Randy Goodrum, Craig Krampf	3:48
2.	"I Believe"	Goodrum, Duane Hitchings, Krampf	4:12
3.	"Go Away"	Cuomo, Goodrum	4:05
4.	"Foolish Heart"	Goodrum	3:39
5.	"It's Only Love"	Goodrum	3:47

Side two
No.	Title	Writer(s)	Length
1.	"She's Mine"	Goodrum	4:26
2.	"You Should Be Happy"	Goodrum	3:20
3.	"Running Alone"	John Bettis, Hitchings, Krampf	4:05
4.	"Captured by the Moment"	Cuomo, Goodrum	3:47
5.	"Strung Out"	Krampf, Billy Steele	3:51

2006 CD reissue bonus tracks
No.	Title	Writer(s)	Length
11.	"My My My" ('Alien Project' demo)	Krampf, Richard Michaels Haddad, Steve DeLacey	2:24
12.	"Harmony" ('Alien Project' demo)		3:58
13.	"Makes No Difference" ('Alien Project' demo)	Krampf, Haddad, DeLacey	4:53
14.	"Don't Tell Me Why You're Leaving" (B-side to Oh Sherrie)	Danny Kortchmar, Krampf	3:13
15.	"If Only for the Moment, Girl" (Originally released on We Are the World (1985))	Goodrum	4:09

== Personnel ==
- Steve Perry – vocals, backing vocals (1–3, 5, 7, 9, 10)
- Bill Cuomo – synthesizers (1, 4, 5, 7–9), acoustic piano (2), synth bells (2), keyboards (3, 6), synth solo (3)
- Randy Goodrum – Rhodes electric piano (1–6, 9), drum programming (4), acoustic piano (15)
- Duane Hitchings – synthesizers (8)
- Steve Goldstein – keyboards (10)
- Sterling Smith – keyboards (10)
- Michael Landau – guitars (1–5, 7, 15), guitar solo (6, 9)
- Waddy Wachtel – guitar solo (1), rhythm guitar solo (5)
- Craig Hull – guitars (8, 10)
- Billy Steele – guitars (10)
- Bob Glaub – bass guitar (1–7, 9, 15)
- Chuck Domanico – string bass (3)
- Kevin McCormick – bass guitar (8)
- Bryan Garofalo – bass guitar (10)
- Larrie Londin – drums (1–3, 5–7, 9), percussion (1–3, 7)
- Craig Krampf – drums (8, 10)
- John Robinson – drums (15)
- Robert Greenidge – steelpan (5)
- Paulinho da Costa – percussion (15)
- Steve Douglas – saxophone solo (2), tenor saxophone (6)
- Joel Peskin – saxophone (15)

== Production ==
- Bruce Botnick – executive producer
- Steve Perry – producer, cover concept
- Niko Bolas – recording, mixing
- Richard Bosworth – recording assistant, additional engineer
- Denny Densmore – recording assistant (10)
- Mike Reese – mastering at The Mastering Lab (Hollywood, California)
- Jim Welch – art direction
- John Scarpati – cover photography
- Herbie Herbert – personal management

== Charts ==
Chart (1984)	Peak position
Australian Albums (Kent Music Report)	79
Canada Top Albums/CDs (RPM)	11
German Albums (Offizielle Top 100)	63
UK Albums (Official Charts)	59
US Billboard 200	12

== Certifications ==
Region	Certification	Certified units/sales
Canada (Music Canada)	Platinum	100,000^{^}
United States (RIAA)	2× Platinum	2,000,000^{^}
^{^} Shipments figures based on certification alone.
