= Randy Goodrum =

American songwriter (born 1947)

- Born: Charles Randolph Goodrum; July 7, 1947 (age 79); Hot Springs, Arkansas
- Genres: Pop; country; rock; jazz
- Occupations: Songwriter; pianist; record producer
- Instrument: Piano
- Years active: 1976–present
- Website: www.randygoodrum.com

Charles Randolph Goodrum (born July 7, 1947) is an American songwriter, pianist, and producer. Goodrum has written (or co-written) numerous popular songs, including Anne Murray's #1 hit "You Needed Me" (1978) and "Broken Hearted Me" (1979), Michael Johnson's "Bluer Than Blue" (1978), England Dan & John Ford Coley's "It's Sad to Belong" (1977), Gene Cotton's "Before My Heart Finds Out" (1978), Steve Perry's "Oh Sherrie" and "Foolish Heart" (1984), DeBarge's "Who's Holding Donna Now", cowritten with David Foster and Jay Graydon, Toto's "I'll Be Over You" (1986) and Chicago's "If She Would Have Been Faithful..." (1987). He also co-wrote with Brent Maher a number of Dottie West's hits in the late 1970s and early 1980s, including her No. 1 Country hit in 1980, "A Lesson in Leavin'".

Goodrum's songs have appeared on the country, pop, jazz, rock, R&B and adult contemporary charts. An accomplished pianist, his music has been used extensively in film and television.

== Early life and education ==
Goodrum was born in Hot Springs, Arkansas to Winnie Goodrum and Bud Goodrum, a physician. He began to play the piano by ear as a small child, imitating his older brother. Goodrum started to take piano lessons at 8, initially studying classical music and later learning to play jazz.

He attended Hot Springs High School, where he performed in a jazz trio, the Three Kings. Also known as the Three Blind Mice for the dark glasses they wore, the trio included Goodrum's friend Bill Clinton on saxophone. He also performed in the area with touring artists. Because he could sight read—and because Arkansas was at a "geographical crossroads" which drew a wide variety of performing musicians—Goodrum played with blues, country, jazz, R&B and rock & roll artists. In a 2000 interview, he said: "Part of the reason I am so diverse is because of where I grew up. You had to be able to play it all, and do it authentically."

Goodrum attended Hendrix College in Conway, Arkansas. Although he had never written songs, a friend asked him to compose the songs for an original musical. Goodrum agreed and discovered a talent for songwriting. Inspired by Joni Mitchell, Randy Newman, Jimmy Webb and James Taylor, he began to focus on writing songs. He graduated with a Bachelor of Music in piano.

== Career ==
Goodrum joined the US Army following his college graduation, where he played in the army band. During his off hours, he wrote songs and decided to pursue a career as a songwriter. Following his 1972 discharge from the army, Goodrum went to Los Angeles to meet with music publishers. Although he was unable to place any of the dozen songs he presented, he was encouraged to continue writing. He returned to Little Rock and planned to move to Los Angeles. Instead, at the suggestion of a friend, Bob Millsap, he moved to Nashville, where he could finance his songwriting endeavors as a pianist-for-hire for session work and live performances. Millsap signed Goodrum to his publishing company, Ironside, and would go on to pitch Goodrum's first major hit, "You Needed Me", with the persistence it required. "The word would come back that song didn't have a chorus, was too pop, didn't fit the Nashville mould, wasn't sing-a-long, that kind of thing," Millsap's co-writer Jerry Flowers said in 2003.

Frustrated as he wrote the song, Goodrum had almost thrown "You Needed Me" away. It was recorded by Anne Murray for her 1978 album, Let's Keep It That Way and peaked at number one on the Billboard Hot 100. It won Song of the Year at the Academy of Country Music awards, earned Murray the Grammy Award for Best Female Pop Vocal Performance at the 21st Grammy Awards, and spent 36 weeks on the Adult Contemporary charts, setting a record for longevity which remained unbroken until 1995. During the same time period, Goodrum wrote five other hit songs: Murray's "Broken Hearted Me" (1979); Michael Johnson's "Bluer Than Blue" (1978); England Dan & John Ford Coley's "It's Sad to Belong" (1977), and Gene Cotton's "Before My Heart Finds Out" (1978).

As a pianist during his early years in Nashville, Goodrum played live and in the studio with artists including Roy Orbison and Jerry Reed. Most significantly, he performed with Chet Atkins, who became both a collaborator and a mentor. With Atkins, Goodrum wrote, "To B or Not to B" and "Waltz for the Lonely", among other songs. Goodrum's composition "So Soft Your Goodbye" won a 1991 Grammy award for Chet Atkins and Mark Knopfler.

In 1979, Dottie West released Special Delivery. Goodrum co-produced the album with Brent Maher, and together they wrote 6 of the album's 10 songs. In early 1980, the Goodrum/Maher song "A Lesson in Leavin'" was released. It was the first of her hits as a solo artist to go to #1 on the Billboard Hot Country Singles & Tracks chart in April; in 1981, West had another #1 with Goodrum's "What Are We Doin' In Love", a duet with Kenny Rogers. Over the next two years, Goodrum wrote songs which were performed by artists including Michael McDonald, Kenny Rogers, Loretta Lynn, Conway Twitty and Tammy Wynette, among others. In 1981, he won six ASCAP Awards.

In 1982, Goodrum signed a worldwide publishing deal with New York-based CBS Songs. He moved briefly to nearby Westport, Connecticut, before relocating to Los Angeles. Although no longer in Nashville, he continued to work with country artists, writing a hit for Sylvia. His credits expanded to include best-selling records in genres including R&B (Patti Austin, El DeBarge), jazz (George Benson, Al Jarreau) and rock (Michael McDonald, Chicago, Toto). In 1984, Goodrum worked with Steve Perry on his solo debut, Street Talk. He partnered with Perry to write five songs for the album and wrote four additional songs in collaboration with others. "Oh Sherrie", written with Perry, Craig Krampf, and Bill Cuomo was #1 on the Billboard Rock Charts and the biggest hit of Perry's career as a solo artist. "Now and Forever (You and Me)", co-written with David Foster and Jim Vallance, was a major hit for Anne Murray in 1986, appearing on the Billboard Hot 100 for six weeks. In the mid-90s, he returned to Nashville, and later wrote hit songs for artists including Ronan Keating and John Berry. In 1999, Boyzone had success with a cover version of "You Needed Me" and Jo Dee Messina's cover of "A Lesson in Leavin'" appeared on the Billboard Hot 100 year-end charts.

Goodrum wrote songs for each of the Clinton/Gore presidential campaigns, including "A Circle of Friends", which was the closing theme for the 1992 Democratic Convention and "Reunion," and performed the theme live on television for Clinton's first Inaugural Gala. "Together as One", written for Kenny Rogers and Trisha Yearwood, was featured during the 1997 Clinton inauguration. Goodrum performed on the CBS television special which aired that night. His film and television credits include Prancer Returns, Snowden on Ice, Back to School and Stir Crazy. He co-wrote the theme for the long-running daytime drama One Life to Live with Dave Grusin.

Goodrum was inducted into the Nashville Songwriters Hall of Fame in 2000. In addition to his work as a songwriter, session player, and producer, he has released six solo albums. He also performs together with Jay Graydon as JaR. They released their first album, Scene 29, in 2008.

Goodrum co-wrote "Most of All" for Steve Perry's 2018 album Traces.

Together with Dave Innis and Bruce Gaitsch Goodrum formed the group GIG, named after the first letters of their surnames. The group has released 3 albums so far: "Brave New World" was released in 2018,, "Wisdom and Madness" in 2022, and The Heart Remembers in 2024.

== Personal life ==
Goodrum and his wife Gail live in Fayetteville, Arkansas. They met while students at Hendrix College, and have two daughters, Julia and Sarah.

== Awards and nominations ==
=== Grammy Awards ===
Randy Goodrum has been nominated for one Grammy Award.

| Year | Nominee / work | Award | Result |
|---|---|---|---|
| 1978 | "You Needed Me" | Song of the Year | Nominated |

=== Other awards and nominations ===
- Song of the Year, National Music Publishers Association ("You Needed Me")
- Song of the Year, Nashville Songwriters Association ("You Needed Me")
- Song of the Year, Academy of Country Music ("You Needed Me")
- Nashville Songwriters Hall of Fame
- American Society of Composers, Authors and Publishers (ASCAP) Country Songwriter of the Year
- American Society of Composers, Authors, and Publishers (ASCAP) Country Song of the Year (Anne Murray, "Now and Forever (You and Me)")
- Odyssey Medal, Hendrix College, 2011
- Arkansan of the Year from the Arkansas Broadcasters Association
- President's Choice Award, Nashville Songwriter's Association International
- Cable Ace Award Song of the Year nominee ("Roundhouse")
- 2026 Arkansas Jazz Hall of Fame inductee

== Selected credits (as songwriter) ==
| Year | Song | Artist | Credit |
|---|---|---|---|
| 1977 | "It's Sad to Belong" | England Dan & John Ford Coley | Songwriter |
| 1978 | "You Needed Me" | Anne Murray (1978); Boyzone (1999) | Songwriter |
| 1978 | "Before My Heart Finds Out" | Gene Cotton | Songwriter |
| 1978 | "Bluer Than Blue" | Michael Johnson | Songwriter |
| 1979 | "Broken Hearted Me" | Anne Murray; England Dan & John Ford Coley (1980) | Songwriter |
| 1979 | "The Very First Time" | Michael Johnson | Songwriter |
| 1979 | "Doors" | Michael Johnson | Co-writer |
| 1980 | "A Lesson in Leavin'" | Dottie West; Jo Dee Messina (1999) | Songwriter |
| 1980 | "Savin' It Up" | Michael Johnson | Songwriter |
| 1981 | "What Are We Doin' in Love" | Dottie West and Kenny Rogers | Songwriter |
| 1982 | "Love Lies" | Michael McDonald | Co-writer |
| 1982 | "That's Why" | Michael McDonald | Co-writer |
| 1982 | "If I Had My Wish Tonight" | David Lasley | Co-writer |
| 1983 | "No Dreams" | Kenny Rogers | Songwriter |
| 1983 | "Q.T." | Michael Johnson | Songwriter |
| 1983 | "Temptation" | Michael Johnson | Songwriter |
| 1984 | "Haunting Me" | Dave Grusin | Co-writer/Singer |
| 1984 | "Tick Tock" | Dave Grusin | Songwriter/Singer |
| 1984 | "Somewhere Between Old And New-York" | Dave Grusin | Co-writer |
| 1984 | "Oh Sherrie" | Steve Perry | Co-writer |
| 1984 | "I Believe" | Steve Perry | Co-writer |
| 1984 | "Go Away" | Steve Perry | Co-writer |
| 1984 | "Foolish Heart" | Steve Perry | Co-writer |
| 1984 | "It's Only Love" | Steve Perry | Co-writer |
| 1984 | "She's Mine" | Steve Perry | Co-writer |
| 1984 | "You Should Be Happy" | Steve Perry | Co-writer |
| 1984 | "Captured By The Moment" | Steve Perry | Co-writer |
| 1984 | "Can't Stop" | Steve Perry | Co-writer |
| 1984 | "Friends of Mine" | Steve Perry | Co-writer |
| 1984 | "(It's Like You) Never Left at All" | America | Songwriter |
| 1985 | "20/20" | George Benson | Co-writer |
| 1985 | "Won't Let You Lose Me" | David Pack | Co-writer |
| 1985 | "Who's Holding Donna Now" | DeBarge | Co-writer |
| 1985 | "Give It Up" | DeBarge | Co-writer |
| 1985 | "Fallin' in Love" | Sylvia | Co-writer |
| 1985 | "If I Believed" | Patti Austin | Songwriter |
| 1985 | "If Only for the Moment, Girl" | Steve Perry | Co-writer |
| 1985 | "Desperate Heart" | Michael Bolton | Co-writer |
| 1985 | "Endless Nights" | Off Course | Co-writer |
| 1985 | "Melody" | Off Course | Co-writer |
| 1985 | "Her Pretender" | Off Course | Co-writer |
| 1985 | "Eyes In The Back Of My Heart" | Off Course | Co-writer |
| 1985 | "Fool (What Does A Fool Do Now)" | Off Course | Co-writer |
| 1986 | "Now and Forever (You and Me)" | Anne Murray | Co-writer |
| 1986 | "I'll Be Over You" | Toto | Co-writer |
| 1986 | "Power" | Kansas | Co-writer |
| 1986 | "If She Would Have Been Faithful..." | Chicago | Co-writer |
| 1986 | "If I Could Hold On to Love" | Kenny Rogers | Co-writer |
| 1987 | "Somebody Like You" | Ronnie Milsap | Co-writer |
| 1988 | "Anna" | Toto | Co-writer |
| 1988 | "These Chains" | Toto | Co-writer |
| 1988 | "Pleasure Over Pain" | Al Jarreau | Co-writer |
| 1988 | "Heart's Horizon" | Al Jarreau | Co-writer |
| 1988 | "Every Little Hurt" | Seiko Matsuda | Co-writer |
| 1988 | "Car Games" | Olivia Newton-John | Co-writer |
| 1988 | "Get Out" | Olivia Newton-John | Co-writer |
| 1988 | "It's Not Heaven" | Olivia Newton-John | Co-writer |
| 1989 | "Got My Way" | Steve Lukather | Co-writer |
| 1989 | "With A Second Chance" | Steve Lukather | Co-writer |
| 1989 | "Turns To Stone" | Steve Lukather | Co-writer |
| 1989 | "The Rest Of The Night" | Natalie Cole | Co-writer |
| 1990 | "Who's That Boy" | Seiko Matsuda | Co-writer |
| 1991 | "So Soft Your Goodbye" | Chet Atkins and Mark Knopfler | Songwriter |
| 1994 | "Lament" | David Hungate | Co-writer |
| 1994 | "Going Home Again" | David Hungate | Co-writer |
| 1994 | "Souvenir" | David Hungate | Co-writer |
| 1994 | "Only A Heart Can Now" | David Hungate | Co-writer |
| 1994 | "A Perfect Love" | David Hungate | Co-writer |
| 1994 | "The Leap" | David Hungate | Co-writer |
| 1994 | "Right Where My Heart Belongs" | Roger Clinton | Co-writer |
| 1995 | "The Other End of Time" | Toto | Co-writer |
| 1995 | "Software" | Michael Johnson | Co-writer |
| 1996 | "No More Mr. Nice Guy" | Steve Wariner | Co-writer |
| 1996 | "The Theme" | Steve Wariner | Co-writer |
| 1996 | "Next March" | Steve Wariner | Co-writer |
| 1996 | "Me Too" | Anne Murray | Co-writer |
| 1996 | "Seasons Change" | Crystal Lewis | Co-writer |
| 1996 | "Running Out Of Daydreams" | Noriyuki Makihara | Co-writer |
| 1997 | "I Will, If You Will" | John Berry | Co-writer |
| 1997 | "Open Your Heart" | Steve Lukather | Co-writer |
| 1999 | "No Love" | Toto | Co-writer |
| 1999 | "One Road" | Toto | Co-writer |
| 1999 | "Melanie" | Toto | Co-writer |
| 2003 | "Melody" | Love Story;Kazumasa Oda Songbook (Various Artists) | Co-writer/Singer |
| 2003 | "Endless Nights" | Love Story;Kazumasa Oda Songbook (Various Artists) | Co-writer/Singer |
| 2006 | "All Over Again" | Ronan Keating | Co-writer |
| 2007 | "Leave a Light On" | Garth Brooks | Co-writer |
| 2008 | "Cheyenne" | Peter Friestedt | Co-writer |
| 2008 | "Careless Mockingbird" | Peter Friestedt | Songwriter/Singer |
| 2008 | "Ever Changing Times" | Steve Lukather | Co-writer |
| 2008 | "The Letting Go" | Steve Lukather | Co-writer |
| 2008 | "New World" | Steve Lukather | Co-writer |
| 2008 | "I Am" | Steve Lukather | Co-writer |
| 2008 | "Stab in the Back" | Steve Lukather | Co-writer |
| 2008 | "Never Ending Nights" | Steve Lukather | Co-writer |
| 2008 | "Ice Bound" | Steve Lukather | Co-writer |
| 2010 | "Brody's" | Steve Lukather | Co-writer |
| 2013 | "Last Man Standing" | Steve Lukather | Co-writer |
| 2015 | "Aria" | Champlin Williams Friestedt | Co-writer |
| 2015 | "Evermore" | Champlin Williams Friestedt | Co-writer |
| 2015 | "Still Around" | Champlin Williams Friestedt | Co-writer |
| 2018 | "Most of All" | Steve Perry | Co-writer |
| 2018 | "10 Miles" | Champlin Williams Friestedt | Co-writer |
| 2018 | "Amanda's Disguise" | Champlin Williams Friestedt | Co-writer |
| 2020 | "Restless Love" | Champlin Williams Friestedt | Co-writer |
| 2020 | "Sometimes You Win" | Champlin Williams Friestedt | Co-writer |
| 2023 | "All Forevers Must End" | Steve Lukather | Co-writer |

== Discography (as primary artist) ==
Singles :

- 1978 This Feeling Inside - (b-side) : Only Everything Arista
- 1979 Blue River Of Tears (mono) - (b-side) : Blue River Of Tears (stereo) Arista
- 1980 Love - (b-side) : Love Posse Records

Albums :

- 1982 Fool's Paradise, Polydor (Japan)
- 1985 Solitary Nights, GRP
- 1991 Caretaker of Dreams, Polydor (Japan)
- 1992 An Exhibition, Polydor (Japan)
- 1994 Words & Music, Polydor (Japan)
- 2008 Scene 29 (with Jay Graydon, as JaR), Pony Records
- 2018 Brave New World (with Dave Innis & Bruce Gaitsch, as GIG), Contante & Sonante
- 2020 Red Eye, Randy Goodrum, Inc dba Clark Street Records
- 2022 Wisdom and Madness (with Dave Innis & Bruce Gaitsch, as GIG), P-Vine
- 2024 The Heart Remembers (with Dave Innis & Bruce Gaitsch, as GIG), P-Vine
- 2026 Pieces, Randy Goodrum, Inc dba Clark Street Records, P-Vine

Compilations :

- 1995 Songbook, Beverly Records (Germany)
