= Oh Sherrie =

Single by Steve Perry

from the album Street Talk
- B-side: "Don't Tell Me Why You're Leaving"
- Released: March 1984 (US)
- Recorded: 1983
- Studio: Record One, Los Angeles
- Genre: Pop rock; arena rock
- Length: 3:48
- Label: Columbia
- Songwriters: Steve Perry; Randy Goodrum; Craig Krampf; Bill Cuomo
- Producers: Steve Perry; Bruce Botnick

Steve Perry singles chronology
"Oh Sherrie" (1984)	"She's Mine" (1984)

Music video
- "Oh Sherrie" on YouTube

"Oh Sherrie" is the debut solo single by American singer Steve Perry. Written by Perry, Randy Goodrum, Craig Krampf and Bill Cuomo, the song was recorded and released on Perry's first solo album Street Talk in 1984, which he released while still a member of Journey. The song is often regarded as an "honorary" Journey song, being credited to the band on several hit compilation albums and in other media, largely due to its resemblance to the band's trademark sound, as well as their performances of the song on the Raised on Radio Tour, which proved to be Perry's live swansong with the band. The track is composed in the key of F major with a time signature of 4/4, following a tempo of 120 beats per minute.

The song was Perry's biggest hit as a solo artist and written for his then-girlfriend Sherrie Swafford, who also appeared in the music video. The song hit number three on the pop chart and number one on the rock chart in the United States, partly aided in its success by a music video released to promote the song, which received heavy airplay on MTV.

Cuomo, Krampf and Perry had started composing the song at approximately midnight with little more than the simple chorus of "Oh Sherrie" and "Hold on, hold on" plus a few simple sounds. Swafford had been in the room with them initially, but had gone to sleep because of the late hour.

== Music video ==
The video was shot at the historic entertainment venue the Park Plaza Hotel - now called the MacArthur, located at 607 South Park View St. in Los Angeles, CA.

The video opens with what appears to be an elaborate formal Royal Wedding, complete with a bride in a large wedding dress, various Royal Court members, trumpet players, minister, and a man wearing a royal robe and a crown. As the bride approaches the altar and groom, she kneels, he takes off his crown revealing he is Steve Perry. He complains he cannot perform this scene. The director yells "cut!" and the camera pulls back to reveal this was an elaborate movie set. The scene is restarted, and again Perry announces he cannot do the scene, claiming it is too pretentious. Stripping off his crown and costume, ignoring various people who want his attention, Perry walks over to a quiet corner and begins singing the song. As he sings, below at a large entrance similar to a church or a train station, his girlfriend Sherrie walks in wearing a white dress. He continues singing, then runs downstairs to sing to her, as she smiles and laughs. He then embraces her as the song ends. As the director calls out to Perry, imploring him to resume the video, Perry escorts Sherrie out as they exit, with his arm around her.

== Personnel ==
- Steve Perry – all vocals
- Bill Cuomo – synthesizers
- Randy Goodrum – Rhodes electric piano
- Michael Landau – guitars
- Waddy Wachtel – guitars solo
- Bob Glaub – bass
- Larrie Londin – drums, percussion

== Chart history ==
=== Weekly charts ===
Chart (1984–86)	Peak position
Australia (Kent Music Report)	5
Canadian RPM 50 Singles	1
Germany German Music Charts	50
Peru (UPI)	3
South Africa (Springbok Radio)	6
New Zealand (Recorded Music NZ)	8
UK Singles (Official Charts)	89
US Billboard Hot 100	3
US Cashbox	4
US Mainstream Rock (Billboard)	1
US Adult Contemporary (Billboard)	33

=== Year-end charts ===
Year-end chart (1984)	Rank
Australia (Kent Music Report)	48
Canada Top Singles (RPM)	16
US Top Pop Singles (Billboard)	31

== See also ==
- List of RPM number-one singles of 1984
- List of number-one mainstream rock hits (United States)
