= Gene Cotton =

American musician and political candidate (born 1944)

- Born: June 30, 1944 (age 81)
- Origin: Columbus, Ohio, U.S.
- Genres: Pop, folk
- Occupation: Singer-songwriter
- Instrument: Vocals
- Years active: 1966–1996
- Website: genecotton.com

Gene Cotton (born June 30, 1944 in Columbus, Ohio) is an American pop and folk singer-songwriter. He is best known for his four Billboard top 40 entries during the years 1976–1978. In the UK, he is most famous for the song "Me and the Elephant," which failed to make the top 40 best sellers, but was an airplay hit. His best known U.S. hit is “Before My Heart Finds Out”, which peaked at #3 on the Adult Contemporary charts.

== History ==
Cotton has been a resident of Leiper's Fork, Tennessee since the late 1970s. Between the late 1990s and mid 2000s, Cotton scaled back his career as a singer and songwriter and spent much of his savings on a legal battle against the construction of Interstate 840 which surrounds Nashville, which substantially delayed the completion of the route and led to a partial redesign of one section. Cotton, the father of two adopted children and one biological child, has devoted himself to helping the underprivileged of his area by motivating them in their studies and activities through a program called Kids on Stage (KOS). KOS brings in Nashville artists to run summer classes that open the doors to the arts to kids who might otherwise never see greatness or think about greatness in their arts. Most notably, Grammy Award winner Michael McDonald has performed numerous times to bring awareness and raise donations for this program under Cotton's leadership, besides producing independent films about the plight of the poor around the world.

Cotton was instrumental in 1970s pop singer Michael Johnson's career.

In 2001, Cotton lost a race for a seat in District 63 of the Tennessee House of Representatives, to Republican Glen Casada. Casada won 3,185 votes to Cotton's 1,554 in a special election in which only 13 percent of registered voters cast ballots. Both Casada and Cotton campaigned on strong opposition to proposals for a state income tax.

== Discography ==
=== Albums ===
Year	Title	Label
1966	Charity Street	Platinum Records
1968	Power to Be	Impact
1970	Peace	Impact
1973	In the Gray of the Morning	Myrrh
1974	Liberty	Myrrh
1975	For All the Young Writers	ABC
1976	Rain On	ABC
1978	Save the Dancer	Ariola America
1979	No Strings Attached	Ariola America
1981	Eclipse of the Blue Moon	Knoll
1982	Best of Gene Cotton	People Song
1983	Edgehill File	People Song
1985	Gene Cotton Live at Tennessee Tech	People Song
1996	Songs for the Journey	People Song

=== Singles ===
Commercial singles

Year	Song	Chart positions			Album
Year	Song	US	US AC	US Country	Album
1968	"Mandy"	–	–	–	Charity Street
1970	"Rhymes and Reasons"	–	–	–	Peace
1973	"American Indian Blues"	–	–	–	In the Gray of the Morning
1973	"Lean on One Another"	–	–	–	In the Gray of the Morning
1973	"The Great American Novel"	–	–	–	Liberty
1974	"Sunshine Roses"	79	30	–	Liberty
1975	"Let Your Love Flow"	–	–	–	For All the Young Writers
1975	"Damn It All"	73	–	–	For All the Young Writers
1976	"Me and the Elephant" (UK only)	–	–	–	Rain On
1976	"You've Got Me Runnin'"	33	7	92	Rain On
1976	"Deeper and Deeper" (Germany only)	–	–	–	Rain On
1976	"Sweet Destiny"	–	–	–	Rain On
1976	"Rain On"	–	–	–	Rain On
1978	"Before My Heart Finds Out"	23	3	78	Save the Dancer
1978	"You're a Part of Me (with Kim Carnes)"	36	6	–	Save the Dancer
1978	"Like a Sunday in Salem (The Amos & Andy Song)"	40	35	–	Save the Dancer
1979	"Ocean of Life"	–	–	–	No Strings Attached
1982	"If I Could Get You (Into My Life)"	76	22	–	Eclipse of the Blue Moon
1985	"I Will Teach God's People"	–	–	–	Single only

Promotional singles

Year	Song	Album
1978	"Going Through The Motions Of Love"	Save The Dancer
1981	"Bein' Here with You Tonight"	Eclipse of the Blue Moon
1981	"Child Of Peace"	Single only
