= You Better Wait =

1994 single by Steve Perry

- Artwork for US CD single

Single by Steve Perry

from the album For the Love of Strange Medicine
- B-side: "Forever Right or Wrong (Love's Like a River)"; "If You Need Me, Call Me"; "One More Time"; "Stand Up (Before It's Too Late)"
- Released: June 28, 1994
- Length: 4:51 (album version); 3:45 (single edit)
- Label: Columbia
- Songwriters: Lincoln Brewster; George Hawkins; Moyes Lucas; Steve Perry; John Pierce; Paul Taylor
- Producer: James "Jimbo" Barton

Steve Perry singles chronology
"Foolish Heart" (1984)	"You Better Wait" (1994)	"Missing You" (1994)

Music video
- "You Better Wait" on YouTube

"You Better Wait" is a song by American singer-songwriter Steve Perry from his second solo studio album, For the Love of Strange Medicine (1994). The ballad was released as the first single from the album on June 28, 1994. The song peaked at number 29 on the US Billboard Hot 100 and reached number one in Canada on the week of September 19, 1994.

== Track listings ==
US CD single

1. "You Better Wait" (long version) – 4:52
2. "Forever Right or Wrong (Love's Like a River)" – 4:29
3. "If You Need Me, Call Me" – 5:49
4. "One More Time" – 3:30
5. "You Better Wait" (single version) – 3:34

US cassette single and Japanese mini-CD single

1. "You Better Wait" (single edit)
2. "Stand Up (Before It's Too Late)"

European maxi-CD single

1. "You Better Wait" (radio edit) – 3:34
2. "You Better Wait" (LP version) – 4:52
3. "Stand Up (Before It's Too Late)" – 4:49

== Charts ==
=== Weekly charts ===
Chart (1994)	Peak position
Canada Top Singles (RPM)	1
Canada Adult Contemporary (RPM)	10
Iceland (Íslenski Listinn Topp 40)	33
US Billboard Hot 100	29
US Adult Contemporary (Billboard)	17
US Mainstream Rock (Billboard)	6
US Pop Airplay (Billboard)	10

=== Year-end charts ===
Chart (1994)	Position
Canada Top Singles (RPM)	49

== Release history ==
Region	Date	Format(s)	Label(s)	Ref.
United States	June 28, 1994	Album rock; top 40; adult contemporary radio	Columbia	
United States	July 1994	CD; cassette	Columbia	
Japan	July 21, 1994	Mini-CD	Sony	
