= Steve Perry =

American singer and songwriter (born 1949)

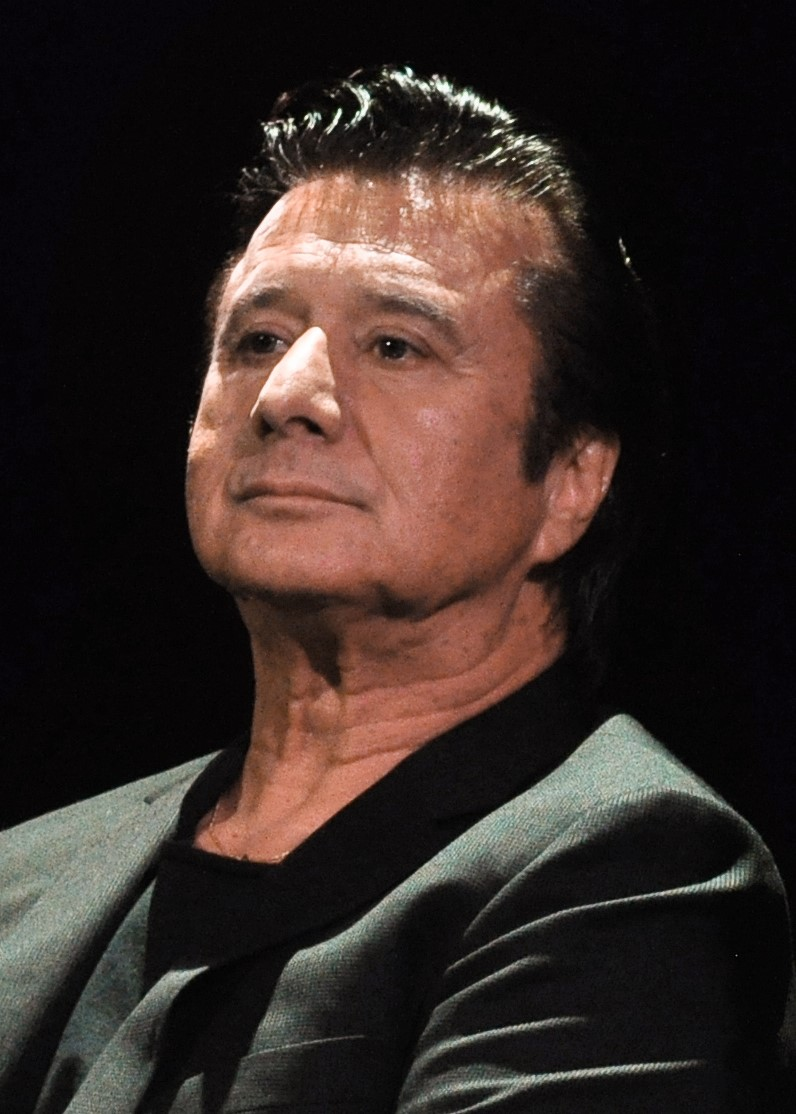
- Perry in 2019

Background information
- Born: Stephen Ray Perry; January 22, 1949 (age 77); Hanford, California, U.S.
- Genre: Rock
- Occupations: Singer; songwriter
- Years active: 1970–present
- Labels: Columbia; Fantasy
- Formerly of: Journey; Alien Project
- Website: steveperry.com

Stephen Ray Perry (born January 22, 1949) is an American singer and songwriter. He was the lead singer and frontman of the rock band Journey during their most successful years from 1977 to 1987, and again from 1995 to 1998. He wrote or co-wrote several Journey hit songs, including "Any Way You Want It", "Don't Stop Believin'", "Open Arms", "Who's Crying Now", "Faithfully" and "Separate Ways (Worlds Apart)". Perry had a solo career from the mid-1980s to the mid-1990s, made sporadic appearances in the 2000s, and returned to music full-time in 2018.

Perry's singing voice has garnered acclaim from prominent musical peers and publications; he has been dubbed "The Voice", a moniker originally coined by Jon Bon Jovi. Ranked No. 76 on Rolling Stone's "100 Greatest Singers of All Time", Perry was inducted into the Rock and Roll Hall of Fame as a member of Journey in 2017. In August 2023, Perry made the Billboard list of the 50 greatest rock lead singers of all time, at number 30. At the same time, Billboard readers chose Perry as their favorite rock singer of all time, with 67 percent of the overall votes.

== Early life ==
Stephen Ray Perry was born in Hanford, California to Portuguese parents from the Azores. He is an only child. Perry grew up interested in music, as his father, Raymond Perry (Pereira), was a vocalist and co-owner of radio station KNGS. Perry's parents ended their relationship when he was eight. He and his mother then moved to his grandparents' dairy farm. They lived in Lemoore, where he attended high school.

On Perry's 12th birthday, his mother, Mary Quaresma, presented him with a gold eighth note pendant; Perry wears the pendant for good luck. At age 12, Perry heard Sam Cooke's song "Cupid" on his mother's car radio; it inspired him to become a singer.

== Career ==
=== Early career ===
In his early 20s, Perry moved to Sacramento to start a band, later named Ice, with 16-year-old future music producer Scott Mathews, who co-wrote, played drums and guitar and sang. In 1972, they recorded at the Record Plant studios in Los Angeles by day while Stevie Wonder recorded his Talking Book album by night. Upon returning to Sacramento, Ice disbanded as they had no management, Mathews was still in high school, and the recordings went virtually unheard. In 1975, Perry moved to Thousand Oaks, California, where he formed a progressive rock band called Pieces with Tim Bogert (who had previously worked with Jeff Beck), Denver Cross, and Eddie Tuduri. After a year and a half, the group was unable to secure a record deal and disbanded. Perry also unsuccessfully auditioned to replace Rod Evans in Captain Beyond.

Perry then moved to Banta, a small community near Tracy, California, where he fronted the band Alien Project in his mid-20s. He nearly gave up music when the bassist of that band, Richard Michaels, was killed in an automobile accident.

=== Journey era ===
Upon returning to Lemoore, Perry decided not to continue his singing career. At the urging of his mother, he answered a call from Herbie Herbert, manager of struggling San Francisco-based band Journey. Herbert had been given a demo of an Alien Project song, "If You Need Me, Call Me", and was told by producer Scott Mathews that the young singer would be a great replacement for then-current frontman Robert Fleischman. Fleischman had never signed with Herbert's company (preferring his previous manager) and had not fully coalesced with the band's then-progressive rock style. Perry joined the tour and, to avoid alarming Fleischman, was referred to as a roadie's Portuguese cousin. During a soundcheck in Long Beach, Perry surreptitiously performed a song with Journey while Fleischman was offstage; soon after, Herbert informed the band members that Perry was the new lead singer.

Perry brought a radically new, more pop-influenced style to the band's music despite some grumblings from the band's existing members and fans of Journey's progressive rock sound. He made his public debut on October 28, 1977, in San Francisco to a mixed reception. Perry eventually won over new fans on his first album with the group, Infinity, which included "Lights", a single he co-wrote with lead guitarist Neal Schon. The band's style changed dramatically, but as Journey began to garner airplay and media buzz over Infinity, Perry's arrival was fully accepted.

Perry provided lead vocals on nine of Journey's albums: Infinity (1978), Evolution (1979), Departure (1980), Dream, After Dream (1980, a Japanese movie soundtrack), Captured (1980, a live album), Escape (1981, which reached No. 1 on the Billboard Top LPs & Tape chart), Frontiers (1983), Raised on Radio (1986), and Trial By Fire (1996). The single "Open Arms" from Escape was their biggest hit single, charting at No. 2 for six weeks on the Billboard Hot 100.

During his Journey tenure, Perry also sang backing vocals on several Sammy Hagar songs, including the 1980 tracks "The Iceman" (a nickname Hagar had for Scott Mathews) and "Run For Your Life", and duetting with Kenny Loggins on the 1982 No. 17 hit single "Don't Fight It".

Steve Perry in 1983, during the Frontiers tour

In 1984, following the release of Frontiers and the tour supporting this effort, Perry released his first solo album, Street Talk. The album's title was derived from the original name of Perry's earlier band Alien Project. The record sold more than 2 million units, scoring the hit singles "Oh Sherrie", written for his then-girlfriend Sherrie Swafford and which went to No. 3 on the Billboard Hot 100, and "Foolish Heart", which went to No. 18. The music video for "Oh Sherrie" was on heavy rotation on MTV. The songs "She's Mine" and "Strung Out" were also released as singles. The album featured former Alien Project drummer Craig Krampf on a few tracks, guitarist Michael Landau, and future American Idol judge Randy Jackson on bass, among others.

In 1985, Perry was one of 21 singers on the USA for Africa all-star benefit song "We Are the World". He also recorded a song, "If Only for the Moment, Girl" for the We Are the World album. This song was added to the reissue of his album Street Talk. Also during this period, Perry worked with the Irish folk-rock group Clannad on their 1987 album Sirius.

While Perry was reuniting with Journey, his mother became ill. The recording of Raised on Radio, which Perry was producing, was stop-and-go as he frequently returned to the San Joaquin Valley to visit his mother, who died during the production of the album. It took a major toll on Journey to have intermittent recording sessions and a vocalist who was not with the band much of the time. Eventually, Perry became exhausted from the ordeal. Journey then went into hiatus in 1987 after the Raised on Radio tour.

In 1988, Perry began to work on another solo album, Against the Wall, which he ultimately left unfinished, although several of the songs that were recorded for the album would appear on Perry's 1998 solo compilation, Greatest Hits + Five Unreleased. A year later, on April 30, 1989, at the Shoreline Amphitheatre in Mountain View, California, Perry joined Bon Jovi to perform Sam Cooke's "Bring It On Home to Me" and the Four Tops' "Reach Out". He would also reunite with Journey at the Bill Graham tribute concert, "Laughter, Love and Music" on November 3, 1991, at Golden Gate Park in San Francisco, performing "Faithfully" and "Lights". Other than those three events, however, Perry mostly disappeared from the public eye for seven years, taking a break from the music industry.

In 1994, Perry released For the Love of Strange Medicine, his second solo effort. The album was successful, partly due to the Strange Medicine world tour.

Journey's classic 1981–85 lineup reunited in 1996 to record Trial by Fire. The album was a huge success, entering the Billboard charts at No. 3 and going platinum before year's end, but its triumph was short-lived. Before the Trial By Fire tour could begin, Perry suffered a hip injury while hiking in Hawaii and was unable to perform. Perry was diagnosed with a degenerative bone condition and a hip replacement was required, and as he was reluctant to rush into the surgery, Perry wanted to postpone the tour. The remaining members waited until 1998, nearly 17 months after Perry's injury, before making a decision on Journey's future. Growing impatient and realizing the window of opportunity was closing to follow up the success of the Trial By Fire LP with a world tour, Journey members Jonathan Cain and Neal Schon met with Perry. They presented him with an ultimatum: If he did not undergo hip replacement surgery so the tour could proceed upon his recovery, the band would hire a replacement singer. Still hesitant to undergo surgery, and now upset at his bandmates, Perry announced that he was permanently leaving Journey. His lead vocal duties were later taken over by Steve Augeri of Tall Stories. Nearly two years after the initial release of Trial by Fire, Journey began to tour.

Perry released his Greatest Hits + Five Unreleased compilation album on December 15, 1998; the unreleased tracks included an original Alien Project demo as well as selections from the abandoned Against the Wall album. Also in 1998, Perry recorded two songs for the Warner Bros. film Quest for Camelot, which can be found on the motion picture's soundtrack. During an episode of VH1's Behind the Music in 2001, Perry stated that he "never really felt like [he] was part of the band". Former manager Herbie Herbert reacted by saying, "That's like the Pope saying he never really felt Catholic."

=== 21st century ===
Perry appeared on two tracks by Kauai, Hawaii, artist Tommy Tokioka's album Happy to Be Living, singing backup vocals on songs "I Wish You Were Mine" and "An Angel Above Me" in 2000. He collaborated with musician Jeff Golub on a song titled "Can't Let You Go" for Golub's Soul Sessions album, which was released in 2003. Perry provided vocals on the mostly instrumental jazz track.

Perry appeared with other Journey members at a ceremony on the Hollywood Walk of Fame on January 21, 2005, after previously stating it was unlikely that he would ever perform with the band again. He indicated that though it was a good experience, it was unlikely that he would rejoin the band. However, he has also said, "never say never, unless you mean never, nevertheless" when the issue of returning to Journey has been mentioned.

Perry co-produced "A Brand New Start", a track on a solo album for former Ambrosia lead vocalist David Pack, in 2005. Perry also provided co-vocals and background vocals for the track, among the many songs he and Pack co-wrote shortly after the September 11, 2001 attacks. That album, The Secret of Moving On, released in September 2005, includes covers of two of Pack's biggest hits with Ambrosia, "Biggest Part of Me" and "You're the Only Woman".

During the 2005 baseball season, the Chicago White Sox adopted Journey's "Don't Stop Believin'" as their unofficial team anthem. As a result, Perry, a San Francisco Giants fan, was asked to attend the World Series and traveled with the White Sox to Houston, where he joined the players on the field and in the locker room as they celebrated winning the championship, their first since 1917.

On October 3, 2006, Perry's two solo projects, Street Talk and For the Love of Strange Medicine (both featuring previously unreleased material), and his Greatest Hits CD were remastered and re-released. Sony Legacy released Playlist: The Very Best of Steve Perry on January 13, 2009.

At three concerts in 2014, Perry joined the indie rock band Eels during the encore and sang several songs.

On April 7, 2017, Perry appeared alongside his Journey ex-bandmates for the first time since 2005 at the band's induction into the Rock and Roll Hall of Fame. Perry gave an acceptance speech, but chose not to perform with the band in deference to current Journey lead singer Arnel Pineda.

Perry released a 10-track studio album, Traces, on October 5, 2018. A U.S. Deluxe Edition was released at Target and has five bonus tracks. Perry has described the album as a "cathartic" and "emotional expression" about the loss of a loved one. The record is Perry's third studio work and his first since For the Love of Strange Medicine.

On December 17, 2018, Perry released a cover of "Have Yourself a Merry Little Christmas".

In March 2019, Perry released a deluxe version of the Traces album, featuring five bonus tracks along with his first official music video in 25 years for "We're Still Here".

On November 1, 2019, Perry released a three-song holiday EP, Silver Bells.

On November 5, 2021, Perry released his first-ever Christmas album, The Season, via Fantasy Records.

On January 4, 2023, Perry confirmed that he sang backing vocals on Dolly Parton's rock album, Rockstar, in addition to singing a duet cover of "Open Arms" on the same album.

On October 18, 2024, Perry announced that he would release a new holiday album, titled The Season 3, on November 8, 2024, through Dark Horse Records.

== Style ==
=== Vocal technique and acclaim ===
Perry is renowned for his tenor vocal range, which spans from F♯_{2} to A_{5}. Perry's voice has been described as a "high 'tenor altino' [with] a tone somewhere between Sam Cooke and Aretha Franklin." He has been dubbed "The Voice", a moniker originally coined by fellow singer Jon Bon Jovi. Queen guitarist Brian May said: "Perry is a truly luminous singer, in my opinion—a voice in a million." Record executive, producer, and former American Idol judge and Journey session musician Randy Jackson has described Perry's voice as "the golden voice," adding that aside from Robert Plant, "there's no singer in rock that even came close to Steve Perry. The power, the range, the tone—he created his own style. He mixed a little Motown, a little Everly Brothers, a little Zeppelin." Journey guitarist Neal Schon likened Perry's ability to that of Aretha Franklin, and agreed with Fozzy vocalist Chris Jericho's assertion that Perry "might be the greatest male singer of all time".

Greg Prato of AllMusic wrote: "If only one singer could be selected as the most identifiable with '80s arena rock, it would have to be Journey's Steve Perry." Prato's colleague John Franck praised Perry's as a soaring "whale of a voice". He was voted among the ten greatest rock singers of all time in a 2009 Classic Rock reader poll. Rolling Stone ranked Perry No. 76 in "The 100 Greatest Singers of All Time", lauding his "technical skills" as well as his "pure tone and passionate sincerity". In August 2023, Perry made the Billboard list of the 50 greatest rock lead singers of all time, coming in at number 30. At the same time, Billboard readers chose Perry as their favorite rock singer of all time, with 67 percent of the overall votes. Geoff Nicholls of Rhythm referred to Perry as "arguably the best singer of his generation".

Sam Cooke, to whom Perry has been compared, was Perry's primary influence. He has also cited the vocal approach of the Beach Boys, Jackie Wilson, Frankie Valli, Lou Christie, Marvin Gaye, Joe Tex, and Jack Bruce of Cream, along with female singers such as Diana Ross, Dee Dee Sharp and Aretha Franklin. Musically, Perry drew influence from Elvis Presley and Chuck Berry. He also spoke of his fondness for Motown recordings and English bands of the late 1960s.

=== Songwriting ===
Perry co-wrote most of Journey's songs throughout his tenure with the band, as well as in his solo efforts. In 2020, he was nominated for the Songwriters Hall of Fame.

== Personal life ==
In the 1980s Perry dated Sherrie Swafford, for whom he wrote the 1984 song "Oh Sherrie".

In 2011, Perry began a relationship with Kellie Nash, a psychologist. She died in December 2012.

In a September 2018 interview, Perry said, "Things happened to me as a child that I still can't talk about – nothing to do with my parents, but things did happen. It happened to a lot of kids, as I find out... there was nowhere to talk it out, so I got to sing it out instead."

In a 2019 interview with Dan Rather, Perry said that he had a daughter and grandchildren, but declined to go into further details saying, "I do have a child, but in the essence of protecting her, I kinda don't want to get into that... and I have grandchildren too."

=== Health ===
Perry underwent successful hip replacement surgery in 1998.

In May 2013, Perry had a mole removed that turned out to be melanoma. He had two surgeries to remove the cancer cells and was told the surgeries were successful, requiring no further treatment.

== Discography ==
=== Studio albums ===
==== Solo ====
Title	Year	Peak chart positions			Certifications
Title	Year	US	AUS	UK	Certifications
Street Talk	1984	12	79	59	RIAA: 2× Platinum
For the Love of Strange Medicine	1994	15	—	64	RIAA: Gold
Traces	2018	6	—	40	
Traces (Alternate Versions & Sketches)	2020	—	—	—	
The Season	2021	80	—	—	

=== Compilation albums ===
==== Solo ====
- Greatest Hits + Five Unreleased (1998)
- Playlist: The Very Best of Steve Perry (2009)
- Oh Sherrie: The Best of Steve Perry (2010)

=== EPs ===
- Silver Bells (2019)

=== Singles ===
==== Solo ====
Title	Release	Peak chart positions					Album
Title	Release	US	US Main	US AC	AUS	UK	Album
"Don't Fight It" (with Kenny Loggins)	1982	17	4	—	—	—	High Adventure (Kenny Loggins)
"Oh Sherrie"	1984	3	1	39	5	89	Street Talk
"I Believe"	1984	—	43	—	—	—	Street Talk
"She's Mine"	1984	21	15	—	—	—	Street Talk
"Strung Out"	1984	40	17	—	—	—	Street Talk
"Foolish Heart"	1984	18	—	2	52	—	Street Talk
"If Only for the Moment, Girl"	1985	—	—	—	—	—	We Are the World (studio album by USA for Africa)
"You Better Wait"	1994	29	6	17	—	—	For the Love of Strange Medicine
"Missing You"	1994	74	—	24	—	—	For the Love of Strange Medicine
"Young Hearts Forever"	1994	—	—	—	—	—	For the Love of Strange Medicine
"Anyway"	1994	—	—	—	—	—	For the Love of Strange Medicine
"Donna Please"	1995	—	—	—	—	—	For the Love of Strange Medicine
"I Stand Alone"	1998	—	—	—	—	—	Greatest Hits + Five Unreleased
"When You're in Love (For the First Time)"	1998	—	—	—	—	—	Greatest Hits + Five Unreleased
"No Erasin'"	2018	—	—	18	—	—	Traces
"No More Cryin'"	2018	—	—	—	—	—	Traces
"We're Still Here"	2018	—	—	14	—	—	Traces
"Sun Shines Gray"	2019	—	—	—	—	—	Traces
"Silver Bells"	2019	—	—	11	—	—	Silver Bells EP / The Season
"—" denotes a recording that did not chart or was not released in that territory.

==== With Journey ====
- Infinity (1978)
- Evolution (1979)
- Departure (1980)
- Dream, After Dream (1980)
- Escape (1981)
- Frontiers (1983)
- Raised on Radio (1986)
- Trial by Fire (1996)

=== Other appearances ===
Year	Song	Artist	Album	Credits
1975	"Sunshine In My Heart Again"	Sanford-Townsend Band	Redux (2025)	Backing vocals
1975	"Stronger and Stronger", "It's Over"	Forrest McDonald	Before the Journey (2009)	Lead vocals
1979	"Sweet Friction"	Ned Doheny	Prone	Backing vocals
1980	"Love or Money", "Iceman", "Heartbeat", "Run..."	Sammy Hagar	Danger Zone	Backing vocals
1980	"I'm Alone"	Eric Martin Band	Area Code 415 (2024)	Backing vocals
1981	"Right Or Wrong", "Yesterday's Gone", "Drive My Car", "Cold Hearted Woman"	Johnny Van Zant Band	Round Two	Backing vocals
1982	"Don't Fight It"	Kenny Loggins	High Adventure	Co-lead vocals
1982	"Self Defense"	Schon & Hammer	Here to Stay	Backing vocals
1984	"Don't You Wanna Go...", "Don't Be a Singer"	Barnes & Barnes	Amazing Adult Fantasy	Backing vocals
1984	"Can't Fall Asleep To A Lullabye"	America	Perspective	Backing vocals
1985	"We Are the World", "If Only for the Moment, Girl"	USA for Africa	We Are the World	Soloist (vocals)
1987	"Still in Love"	Sheena Easton	No Sound But a Heart	Backing vocals
1987	"White Fool" / "White Fool – Reimagined" (2022)	Clannad	Sirius	Vocal chants
1988	"Soldiers of Peace"	CSNY	American Dream	Backing vocals
1996	"Primal"	Jason Becker	Perspective	Vocal chants
1998	"United We Stand", "I Stand Alone"	C. Bayer Sager/D. Foster	Quest for Camelot	Lead vocals
1999	"Send My Baby Home"	Laidlaw	First Big Picnic	Backing vocals
2000	"I Wish You Were Mine", "An Angel Above Me"	Tommy Tokioka	Happy To Be Living	Co-lead vocals
2003	"Can't Let You Go"	Jeff Golub	Soul Sessions	Lead vocals
2005	"A Brand New Start"	David Pack	The Secret of Movin' On	Co-lead vocals
2007	"I Can See It In Your Eyes"	Guff	Symphony of Voices	Co-lead vocals
2009	"Promenade"	SSSC	St. Sweeper Social Club	Vocal chants
2012	"Follow the Freedom"	Bohème	Follow the Freedom	Backing vocals
2014	"If You (Don't) Need (Me)"	Tony Ferrari	Gentleman	Backing vocals
2016	"Arms", "Let Go"	State to State	Motives	Backing vocals
2020	"Promises You Can't Keep"	Robert Cray	That's What I Heard	Backing vocals
2021	"Automatic", "Can't Get Over", "Chameleon", "Show Me The Way"	Levara	Levara	Backing vocals
2022	"Fine Wine And Vinyl", "Alive", "Say It With Love", "What About Love?", "Where There's A Woman..."	Mindi Abair	Forever	Backing vocals
2023	"The Streets of Kinsale"	The High Kings	The Road Not Taken	Backing vocals
2023	"Sacred Ground", "Gravity & Love", "I Can Breathe", "Chasing the Sun", "Don't Leave"	Lois Mahalia	Chasing the Sun	Backing vocals
2023	"Separate Ways", "Only the Young"	Bryce Miller	Stranger Things S4	Lead vocals
2023	"Open Arms"	Dolly Parton	Rockstar	Co-lead vocals
2024	"It Could Have Been You"	The Effect	The Effect	Backing vocals
2025	"Faithfully"	Willie Nelson	single	Co-lead vocals

== Filmography ==
=== Music videos ===
Year	Title	Director
1978	"Wheel in the Sky"	Bruce Gowers
1978	"Feeling That Way"	Bruce Gowers
1978	"Lights"	Bruce Gowers
1979	"Just the Same Way"	Bruce Gowers
1979	"Lovin', Touchin', Squeezin'"	Bruce Gowers
1979	"Too Late"	Bruce Gowers
1979	"Lovin' You Is Easy"	Bruce Gowers
1980	"Any Way You Want It"	Kim Paul Friedman
1981	"Don't Stop Believin'"	Dave Levisohn
1981	"Stone in Love"	Dave Levisohn
1981	"Who's Crying Now"	Dave Levisohn
1982	"Open Arms"	Dave Levisohn
1983	"Separate Ways (Worlds Apart)"	Tom Buckholtz
1983	"Chain Reaction"	Tom Buckholtz
1983	"After the Fall"	Tom Buckholtz
1983	"Faithfully"	Phil Tuckett
1983	"Send Her My Love"	Phil Tuckett
1984	"Oh Sherrie"	Jack Cole
1984	"Strung Out"	Jack Cole
1985	"Foolish Heart"	Jack Cole
1985	"We Are the World"	Tom Trbovich
1986	"Be Good to Yourself"	Wayne Isham
1986	"Girl Can't Help It"	Wayne Isham
1986	"I'll Be Alright Without You"	Wayne Isham
1987	"Why Can't This Night Go on Forever"	Wayne Isham
1992	"Lights (Version 2)"	Tom McQuade
1994	"You Better Wait"	Unknown
1994	"Missing You"	Ken Ross
1996	"When You Love a Woman"	Wayne Isham
1998	"I Stand Alone"	Unknown
2018	"No Erasin'"	Jeff Coffman
2018	"No More Cryin'"	Jeff Coffman
2018	"We're Still Here"	Jeff Coffman
2018	"Most of All (Radio Mix)"	Jeff Coffman
2019	"We're Still Here (Version 2)"	Myriam Santos
