= Crazy in Love (disambiguation) =

"Crazy in Love" is a 2003 song by Beyoncé featuring Jay-Z.

Crazy in Love may also refer to:

== Film and television ==
- Crazy in Love (film), a 1992 American comedy film
- Crazy in Love, Europe release title of Mozart and the Whale, a 2005 American film starring Josh Hartnett
- "Crazy in Love" (Will & Grace), a 2001 episode of Will & Grace
- Kerry Katona: Crazy in Love, British reality television series starring Kerry Katona

== Music ==
- Crazy in Love (Conway Twitty album), a 1990 album by Conway Twitty
- Crazy in Love (Itzy album), a 2021 album by Itzy
- "Crazy in Love" (Joe Cocker song), 1984; notably covered by Kim Carnes Conway Twitty, and Kenny Rogers
- "Crazy in Love" (Jill Johnson song), 2003
- Crazy in Love!, a 1957 album by Trudy Richards
- "Crazy in Love", a 1963 single by The Ike-Ettes
- "Crazy in Love", a song by Eminem on the 2004 album Encore
- "Crazy in Love", a song by Nicol Sponberg
- "Crazy in Love", a 2012 single by DJ Project feat Giulia
- "Crazy in Love", a 2021 song by Shayne Ward

== See also ==
- Crazy Love (disambiguation)
