= Toyota Stadium (Texas) =

Soccer stadium in Texas, United States

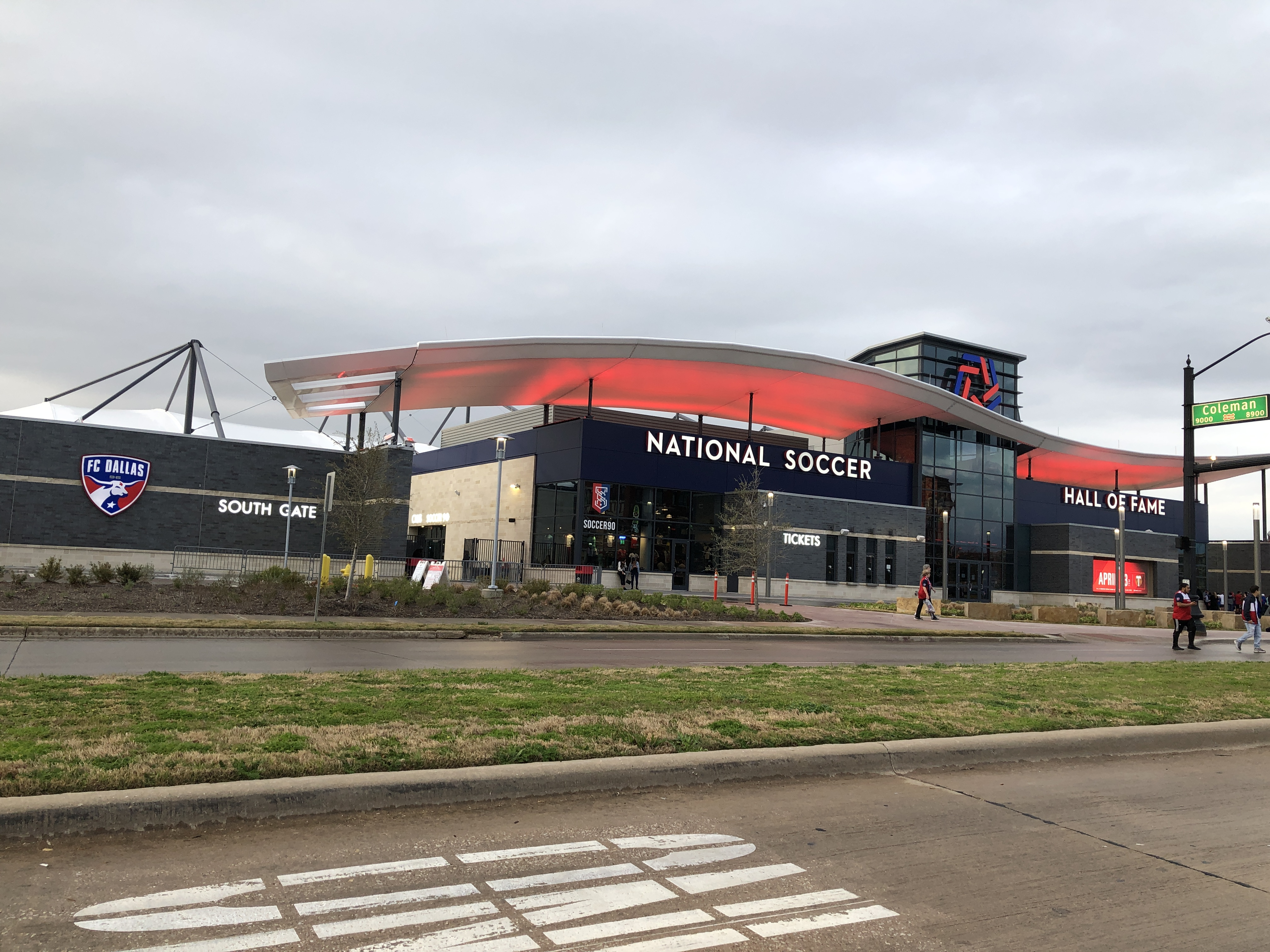
- South End Entrance

- Location in the United States Location in Texas
- Interactive map of Toyota Stadium
- Former names: Frisco Soccer & Entertainment Complex (2004–2005); Pizza Hut Park (2005–2012); FC Dallas Stadium (2012–2013)
- Address: 9200 World Cup Way
- Location: Frisco, Texas, U.S.
- Coordinates: 33°9′16″N 96°50′7″W
- Owner: City of Frisco
- Operator: Frisco Soccer, LP
- Capacity: 11,000 (during construction); 23,900 (after redevelopment)
- Surface: Latitude 36 Bermuda Grass
- Field size: 117 by 74 yards (107 by 68 meters)

Construction
- Groundbreaking: February 18, 2004
- Opened: August 6, 2005; 21 years ago
- Renovated: 2018, 2025–present
- Cost: $80 million ($132 million in 2025); 2018 renovation: $55 million; 2028 redevelopment: $191 million
- Architect: HKS, Inc.
- Structural engineers: HKS, Inc.
- General contractors: Lee Lewis Construction, Inc.; Moss And Associates (2028 redevelopment)

Tenants
- FC Dallas (MLS) (2005–present); Frisco ISD football (2005–present); Frisco Bowl (NCAA) (2017–present) (Note: The 2025 edition of the Frisco Bowl was relocated to the Ford Center at The Star due to renovation work.); Dallas Renegades (UFL) (2026–present); NCAA DI Football Championship (2010–2025); National Soccer Hall of Fame (2018–present); North Texas SC (USL1) (2019)

Website
- newtoyotastadium.com

Toyota Stadium is a sports venue located in Frisco, Texas, a suburb of Dallas. Built and owned by the city of Frisco, its primary tenant is Major League Soccer club FC Dallas. The United Football League's Dallas Renegades and the Frisco Independent School District, which supported the construction to host their high school football games, also utilize the stadium. Additionally, it is the home of the National Soccer Hall of Fame, which opened in 2018. It is currently undergoing a major redevelopment scheduled to be completed in 2028.

== History ==
Toyota Stadium was the third MLS soccer-specific stadium to be built after Historic Crew Stadium in Columbus, Ohio (1999) and Dignity Health Sports Park near Los Angeles (2003). It opened on August 6, 2005 with a match between FC Dallas and the New York Red Bulls, which ended in a 2–2 draw. The stadium cost approximately $80 million ($132 million in 2025), and initially included 18 luxury suites as well as a private 6,000-square-foot (560 m^{2}) club.

The stadium originally seated 20,500 in a U-shaped design with the north end including a permanent covered stage for hosting concerts, similar to SeatGeek Stadium near Chicago, which opened one year after Toyota Stadium (Chicago Fire FC has since left that stadium). Although it was then hoped the permanent stage would help the stadium increase revenue by hosting mid-sized concerts, the design proved unpopular and other MLS clubs opted not to include permanent stages in their new stadiums, leaving Toyota Stadium's design looking dated. There was widespread support among club supporters for the stage to be removed and replaced with a full stand, which eventually led the city to do exactly that in the major redevelopment of the stadium announced in 2024.

The stadium played host to the 2005 MLS Cup final, seeing the LA Galaxy defeat the New England Revolution 1–0 in extra time for their second MLS Cup. It was also selected to host the 2006 MLS Cup, which ended 1–1 after extra time with the Houston Dynamo defeating the Revolution 4–3 on penalty kicks. In 2016, FC Dallas hosted and won the U.S. Open Cup Final, also against the Revolution.

== Toyota Soccer Center ==
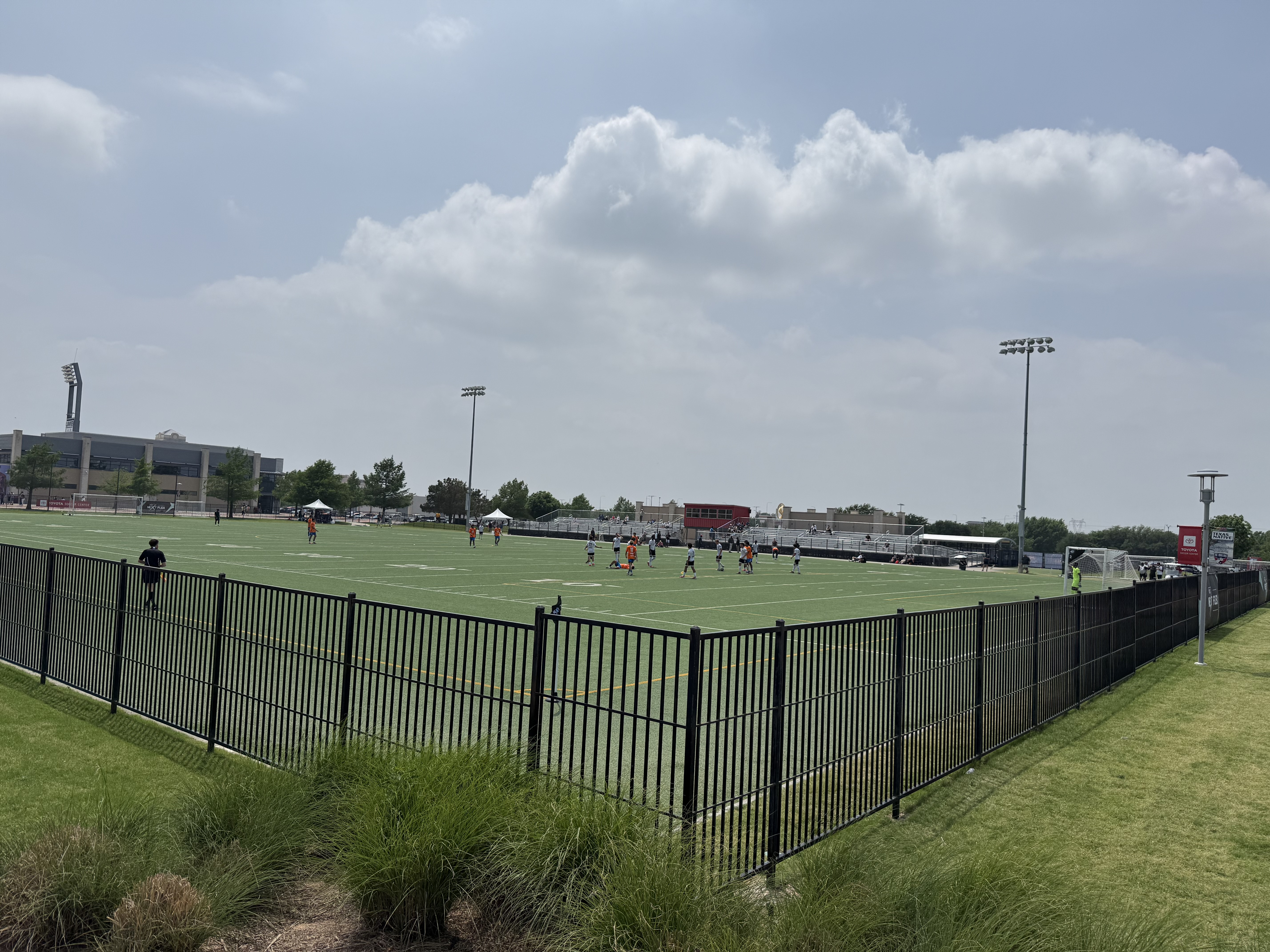
MLS Next Flex 2026 youth soccer tournament held at Toyota Soccer Center Pink Field

The complex also includes Toyota Soccer Center which has an additional 17 regulation size, lighted, stadium-quality soccer fields (both grass and artificial turf) outside the stadium. These fields are used for practice by FC Dallas, the FC Dallas reserve squad and academy, adult leagues and youth tournaments. Youth tournaments that have made use of the complex include Dallas Cup, Olympic Development Program National Championships, Generation Adidas Cup, USYSA National Championships, and MLS Next.

North of the main stadium is Pink Field, a mini-stadium named after former Frisco doctor Dr. Erwin G. Pink. The field is used for Frisco ISD high school football and soccer.

== Stadium name ==
From 2005 until January 2012, the naming rights to the facility were held by national pizza chain Pizza Hut, which was headquartered in nearby Plano, and the stadium was known as Pizza Hut Park. Nicknames for Pizza Hut Park included PHP, the Hut, and The Oven, the latter referring to Texas' summer climate during afternoon games (and also because the field is well below ground level). In 2012 the contract linking the pizza franchise with the stadium expired, and the stadium was renamed FC Dallas Stadium.

In 2013 FC Dallas reached an agreement with Gulf States Toyota Distributors, headquartered in Houston to rename it Toyota Stadium, with the 17 practice fields around the stadium to be called Toyota Soccer Center.

== Renovations ==
=== 2018 renovation ===
In 2018 a $55 million renovation of the south end of the stadium was completed. Additions included new field access tunnels, locker rooms, a press conference room, team store, and a multi-tiered viewing stand that replaced the old bleacher section. The project also included a European-style roof built over the south end of the stadium.

One of the more notable additions was the National Soccer Hall of Fame, which included the National Soccer Hall of Fame Experience and the 19,350 square-foot National Soccer Hall of Fame Club. This addition made Toyota Stadium the first league sports hall of fame to be built within a stadium.

Even with the renovations, many club supporters wanted roof structures to be built over the west and east stands to provide shade during the brutal Texas summers. However, those projects were postponed until 2024, when the city of Frisco approved a larger renovation project addressing these issues.

=== 2028 redevelopment ===
Interior rendering of the final project

After 20 new MLS stadiums were built since 2005 and facing criticism that Toyota Stadium was dated (only LA Galaxy play in an older soccer-specific stadium), the city of Frisco approved a major $182 million redevelopment project in 2024, an upgrade so extensive that it was officially branded New Toyota Stadium.

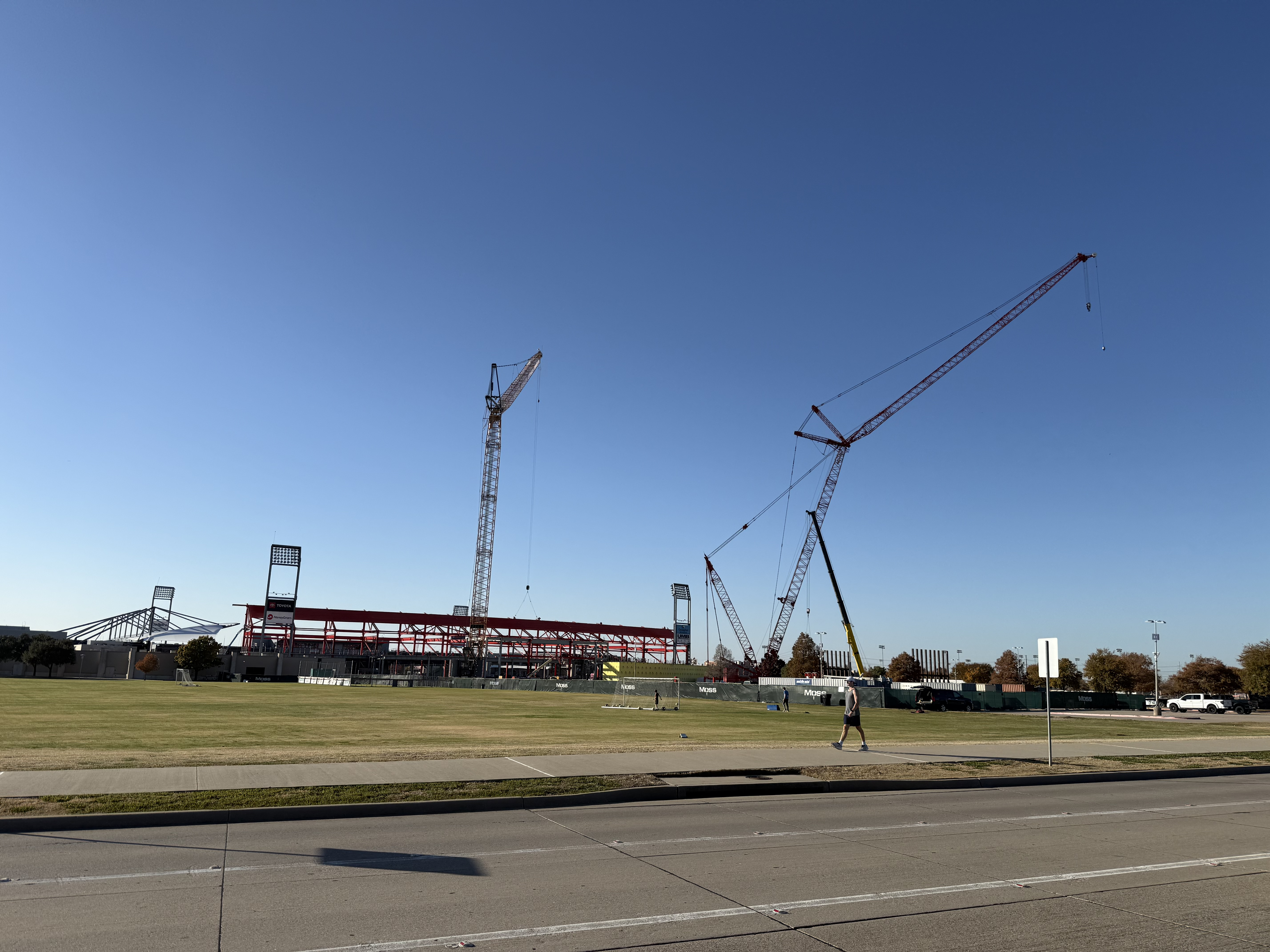
The new east stand roof during construction in 2025. The grass area in the foreground will be the location of the final phase of the project.

Nearly every structure located above the original seating bowl on the east, west, and north sides was demolished from 2025-26 with new structures to be built. Improvements include three new clubs, new east, west, and north entrances, the removal of the unpopular north end concert stage and addition of a new north stand, the largest LED video board of any soccer-specific stadium in the nation, new seating, new sound system, European-style roof structures covering the east, west, and north stands (that will provide much-needed shade for supporters), and replacing the original light towers with LED systems built into the new roof structures. Once completed, the stadium capacity will increase by 3,400 to 23,900.

The last phase of the project will include over 1.2 million square feet of office space, a 200-room upscale hotel, a 200-unit multifamily high-rise building, and 30,000 square feet of retail and restaurant space.

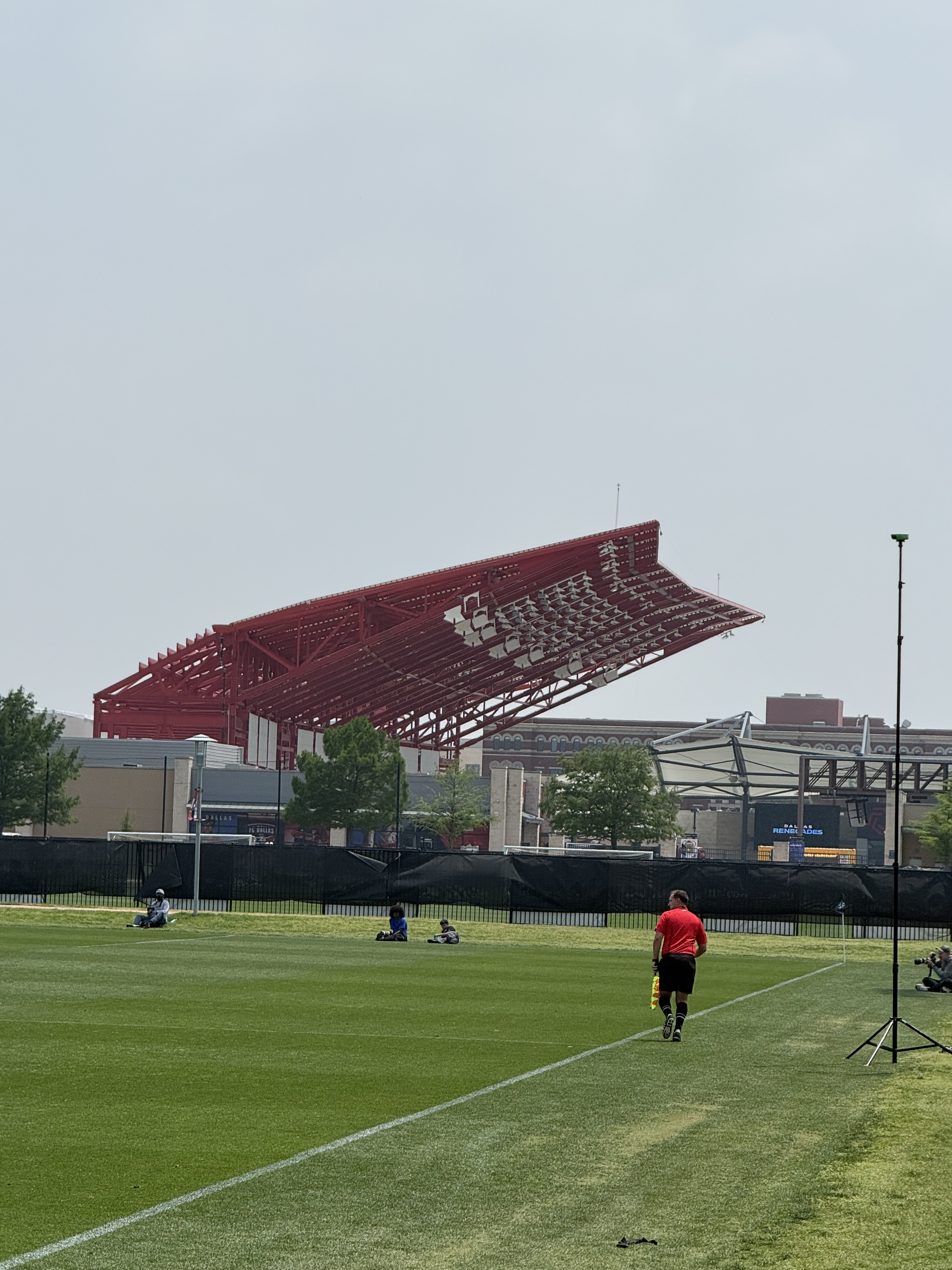
New east stand roof

The construction will be carried out in phases, with work on the east side of the stadium commencing following the FCS Championship game in January 2025. The project is scheduled to be completed before the start of the 2028 FC Dallas season. The initial phase of development saw stadium capacity drop to about 11,000 during the 2025 FC Dallas season.

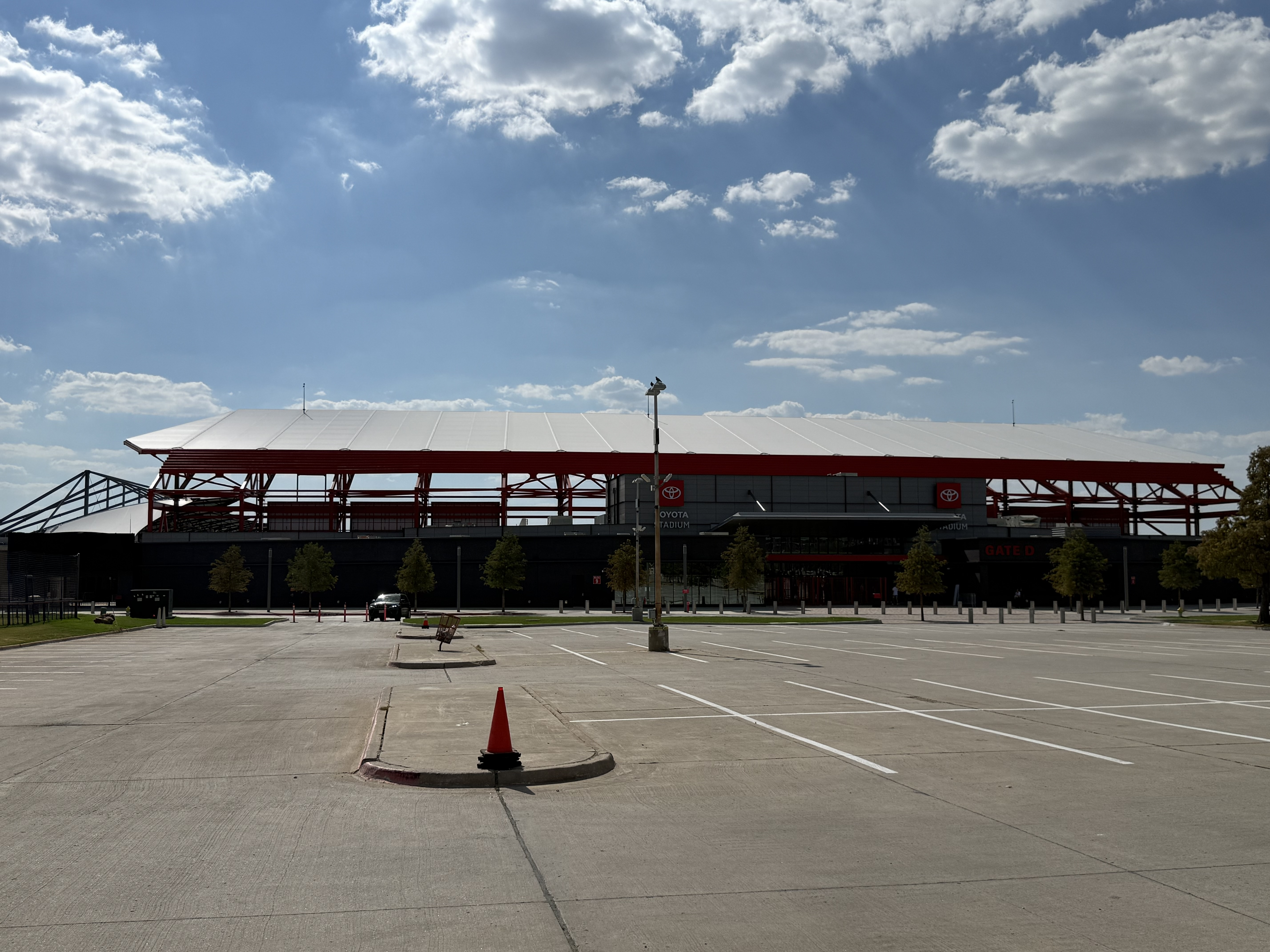
Rebuilt east end completed in 2026

In addition to the renovation project, FC Dallas signed a lease extension to keep the club in Frisco through 2057.

In April 2026 the city of Frisco approved a further $9 million to the project to cover unexpected repairs to the stadium foundation and installation of a new WiFi system, bringing the total cost of the project to $191 million.

In June 2026 the stadium made international headlines when the Sweden national soccer team was training there during the 2026 FIFA World Cup. An apparent error by the demolition crew caused the old west stand structure to collapse onto the temporary press box that was being built.

== National Soccer Hall of Fame ==
In 2015 plans were announced that the stadium would be the new home of the National Soccer Hall of Fame which was completed in 2018. The Hall of Fame has two components – the NSHOF Experience and the NSHOF Club. The Experience houses the museum and serves as the location for the Hall of Fame annual induction ceremony. The Club includes specialty seating for season ticket holders for all FC Dallas home matches, as well as multiple event spaces that function as food and beverage hubs on game days. The NSHOF includes soccer memorabilia, modern technology, and virtual reality exhibits.

== Notable events ==
=== College football ===
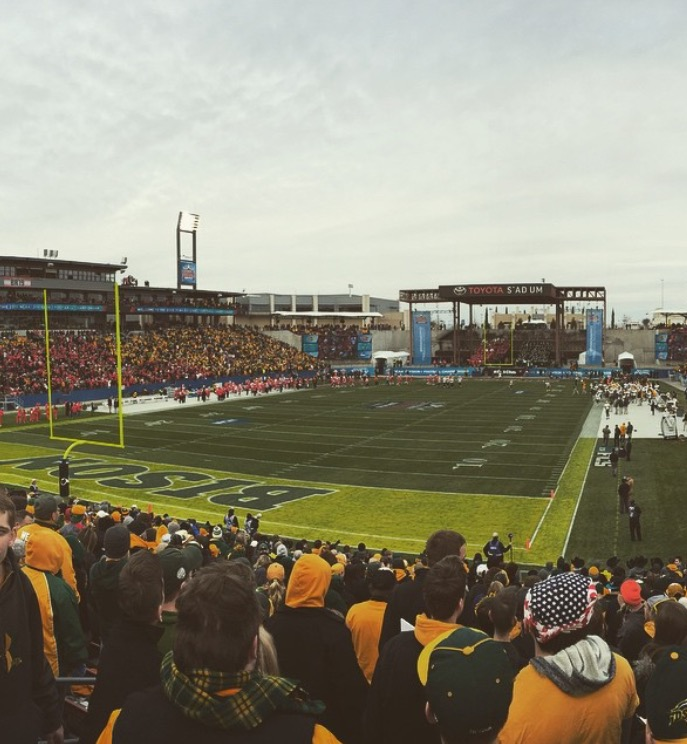
2015 FCS National Championship football game between North Dakota State and Jacksonville State at Toyota Stadium.

- Beginning in 2010, the stadium became the new host of the NCAA Division I Football Championship, the title game of college football's Football Championship Subdivision (formerly Division I-AA). The contract, originally for the 2010 through 2012 seasons, has been extended three times: first through the 2015 season, next through the 2019 season, and most recently through the 2024 season with an option for the 2025 season. The game had been played for the previous 13 seasons in Chattanooga, Tennessee.
- The Frisco Bowl postseason college football game had its inaugural game played at the stadium on December 20, 2017. As of 2021 the bowl continues to be held annually.
- The 2020 edition of the New Mexico Bowl, between the University of Hawaii and University of Houston, was scheduled in Toyota Stadium for December 24, 2020, due to COVID-19 restrictions in New Mexico.
- In 2021, the Frisco Football Classic was held in Toyota Stadium between the North Texas Mean Green and the Miami RedHawks. The NCAA approved the bowl game in order to accommodate all 83 bowl-eligible teams; otherwise, one bowl-eligible team would not have been selected for a bowl game. The added bowl game essentially serves as a replacement of the canceled San Francisco Bowl.

=== Soccer ===
- In December 2008, the stadium hosted the NCAA Men's College Cup. In the semifinals, North Carolina defeated Wake Forest, and Maryland defeated St. John's. Maryland defeated North Carolina in the final.
- On August 5, 2010, a then-record crowd of 21,193 saw FC Dallas and Inter Milan, fresh off victory in the 2010 UEFA Champions League Final, play to a 2–2 exhibition tie.
- On March 19, 2011, FC Dallas opened the 2011 season against the Chicago Fire with a 1–1 tie. The game was the team's first ever regular season sellout (20,145 spectators).
- On July 28, 2012, FC Dallas set a single-game attendance record of 22,565 when the visiting LA Galaxy defeated Dallas 1–0.
- The stadium played host to the inaugural men's soccer tournament of the American Athletic Conference.
- The stadium played host to matches in the 2015, 2017, 2019, and 2021 CONCACAF Gold Cup.
- The stadium also hosted the 2016 CONCACAF Women's Olympic Qualifier. It also hosted the second leg of the 2016 Men's Olympic Qualifying Playoff between the United States and Colombia.
- The stadium made international headlines in 2023 when Lionel Messi, widely considered the greatest player in history, played his first away match for Inter Miami at the stadium in a Leagues Cup match. The match ended 4-4 after normal time, with Miami winning 5-3 on penalties to advance. Club co-owner and English football legend David Beckham was in attendance. Messi and Miami would go on to win the tournament, the club's first trophy.
- The stadium hosted the 2024 Copa América qualifying play-offs in March 2024 to determine the last two teams to qualify for the 2024 Copa América.
- In June 2026 the stadium hosted the Sweden men's national soccer team as they trained for the 2026 FIFA World Cup

=== Concerts ===
In August 2008, the stadium hosted the heavy metal/hard rock festival tour Ozzfest. It had regularly hosted concerts by Jimmy Buffett. It was also the site for several editions of Edgefest organized by former Dallas alternative rock station KDGE.

==== Notable concerts ====
Date	Artist(s)	Opening act(s)	Tour	Tickets sold	Revenue	Additional notes
April 15, 2007	My Chemical Romance	Muse	The Black Parade World Tour	—	—	This concert was part of Edgefest.
April 28, 2007	Jimmy Buffett	—	Bama Breeze Tour	—	—	
April 26, 2008	Jimmy Buffett	—	The Year of Still Here Tour	—	—	
April 27, 2008	My Chemical Romance	Billy Talent; Drive By	The Black Parade World Tour	—	—	This concert was part of Edgefest.
August 9, 2008	Metallica	—	2008 European Vacation Tour	—	—	This concert was part of Ozzfest.
April 18, 2009	Jimmy Buffett	—	Summerzcool Tour	—	—	
May 17, 2009	Kenny Chesney	Lady Antebellum; Miranda Lambert	Sun City Carnival Tour	25,026 / 25,026	$1,840,494	The concert was originally scheduled on May 2, 2009, but was rescheduled due to heavy rain and lightning.
May 22, 2010	Jimmy Buffett	—	Under the Big Top Tour	—	—	
September 18, 2010	Kiss	Pat Green; Drowning Pool	The Hottest Show on Earth Tour	—	—	
May 21, 2011	Jimmy Buffett	Ilo Ferreira	Welcome to Fin Land Tour	—	—	
April 22, 2012	Garbage	—	Not Your Kind of People World Tour	—	—	These concerts were part of Edgefest.
April 22, 2012	The Black Keys	Arctic Monkeys	El Camino Tour	—	—	These concerts were part of Edgefest.
April 22, 2012	Evanescence	—	Evanescence Tour	—	—	These concerts were part of Edgefest.
May 4, 2013	Jimmy Buffett	Jackson Browne	Songs from St. Somewhere Tour	—	—	
June 21, 2014	Jimmy Buffett	Jackson Browne; John Fogerty; Monte Montgomery	This One's For You Tour	—	—	
May 30, 2015	Jimmy Buffett	Huey Lewis & The News	Workin' n' Playin' Tour	—	—	
September 5, 2015	Ed Sheeran	Christina Perri; Jamie Lawson	x Tour	30,665 / 30,665	$1,571,889	
May 28, 2016	Jimmy Buffett	Jerry Jeff Walker	I Don't Know Tour	—	—	
June 10, 2017	Jimmy Buffett	—	I Don't Know Tour	—	—	Billy Gibbons of ZZ Top was the special guest.
October 20, 2018	Imagine Dragons	—	Evolve World Tour	—	—	
May 4, 2019	Performers: Luke Bryan; Jake Owen; Craig Morgan; Aaron Watson; Abby Anderson; Ashley McBryde; Carlton Anderson; Kylie Frey; Harper Grace; DJ Rock	—	Off the Rails Country Music Fest	—	—	
May 5, 2019	Performers: Sam Hunt; Luke Combs; Morgan Evans; Eli Young Band; Travis Denning; Lauren Alaina; Jameson Rodgers; Ray Johnston Band; Grace Tyler; DJ Rock	—	Off the Rails Country Music Fest	—	—	
September 21, 2019	OneRepublic; The Fray	Maelyn Jarmon	National Soccer Hall of Fame Induction Weekend	—	—	
October 2, 2021	Willie Nelson	—	National Soccer Hall of Fame Induction Weekend	—	—	

== Gallery ==
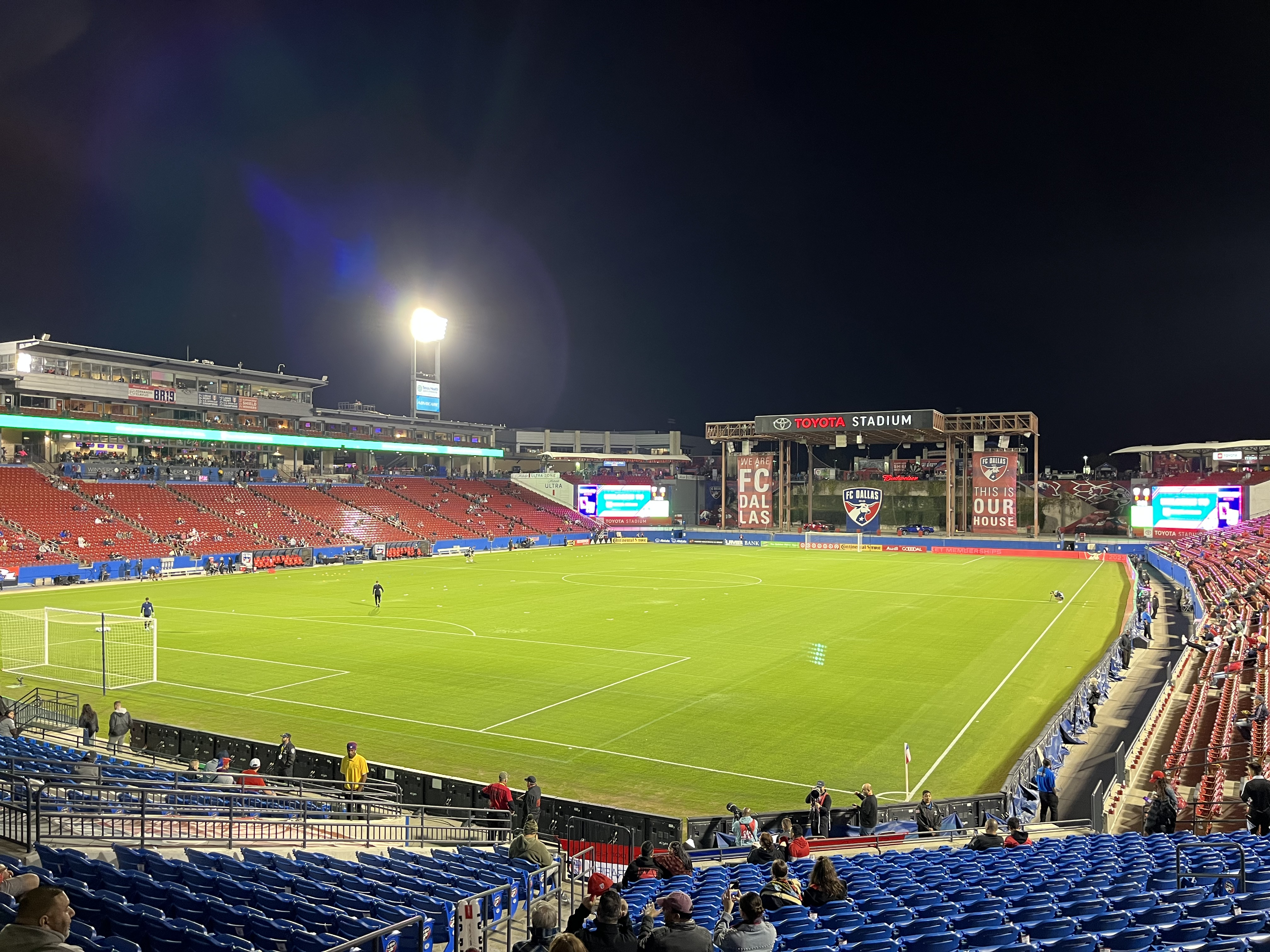

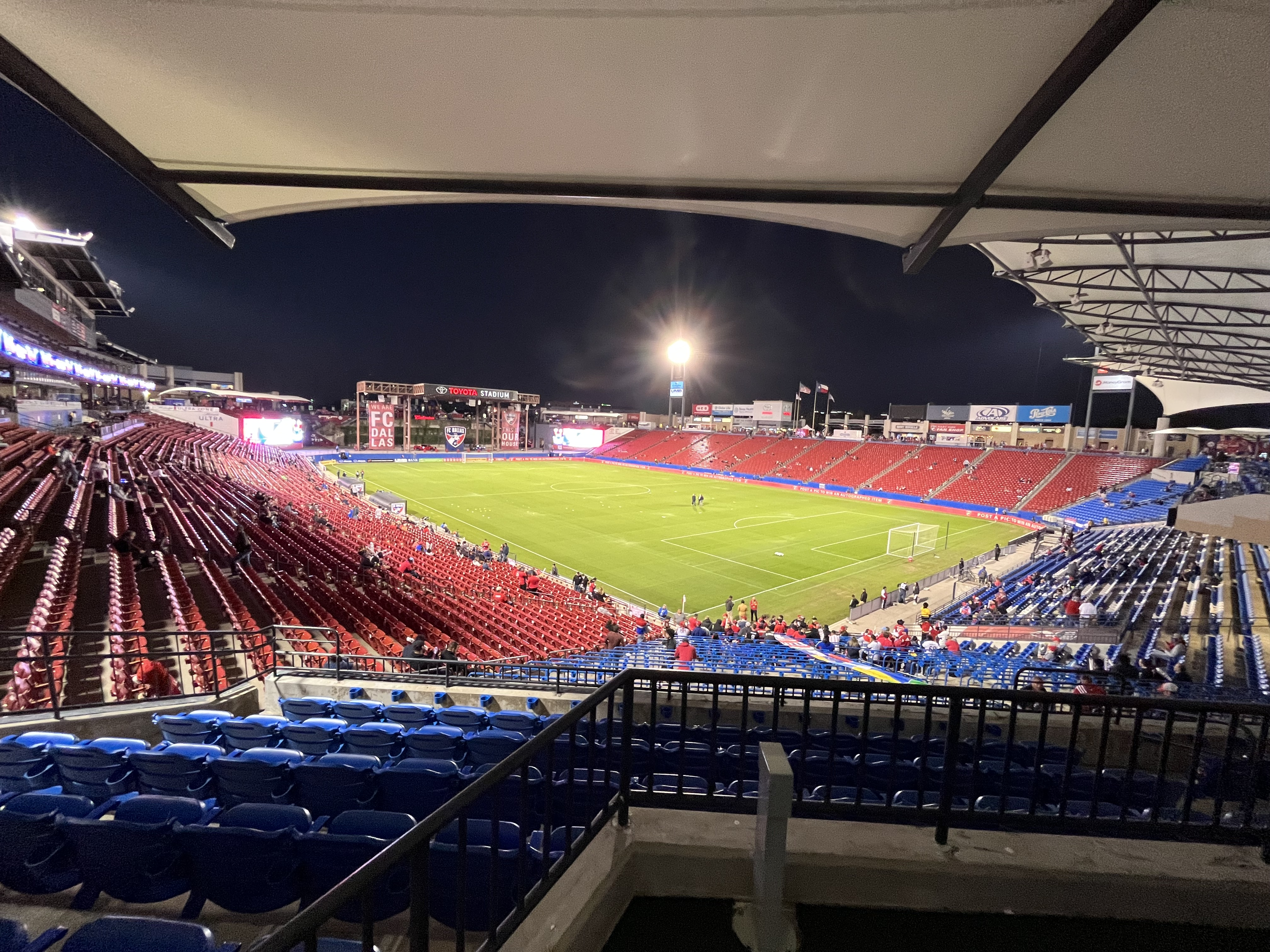

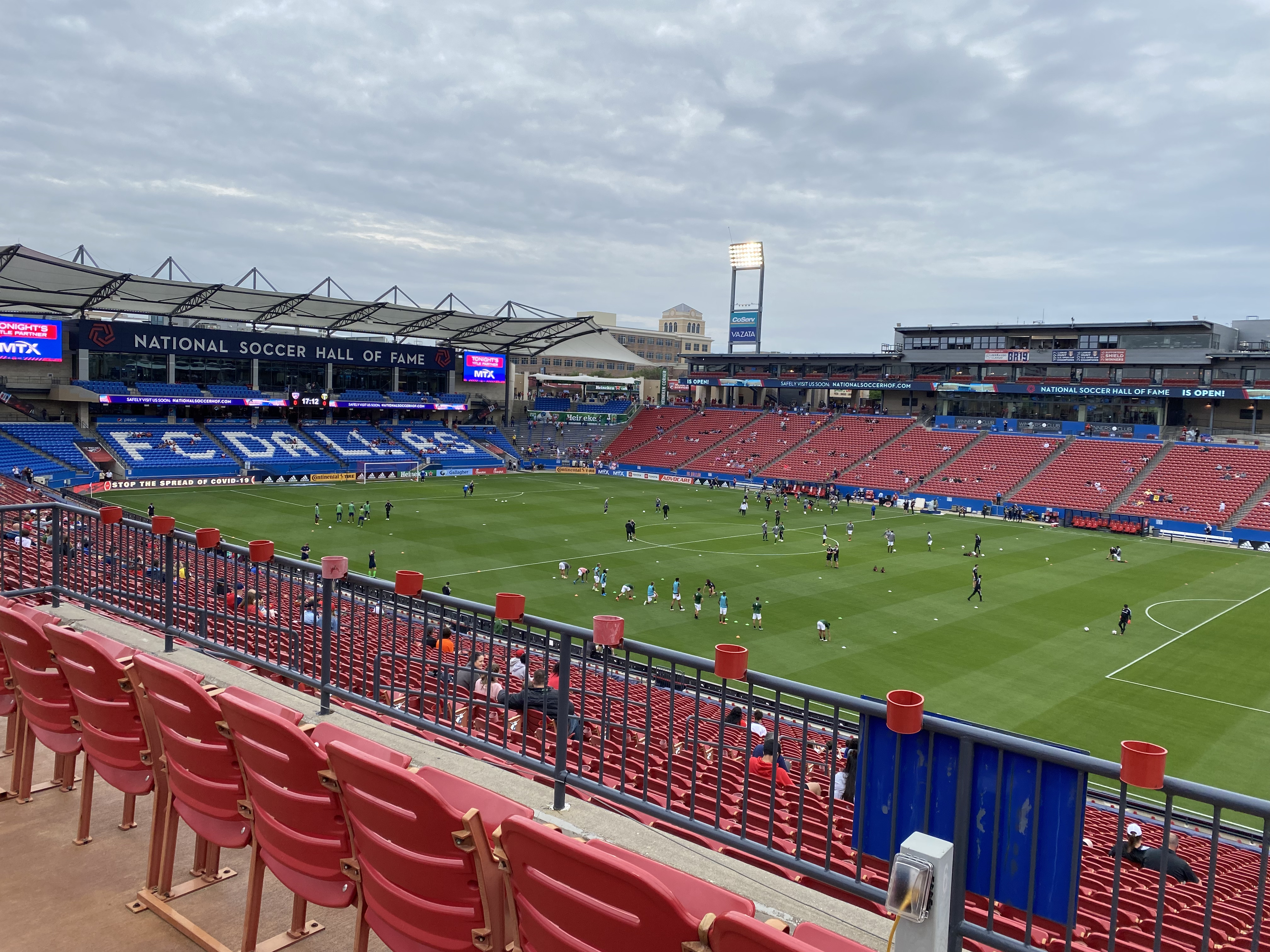

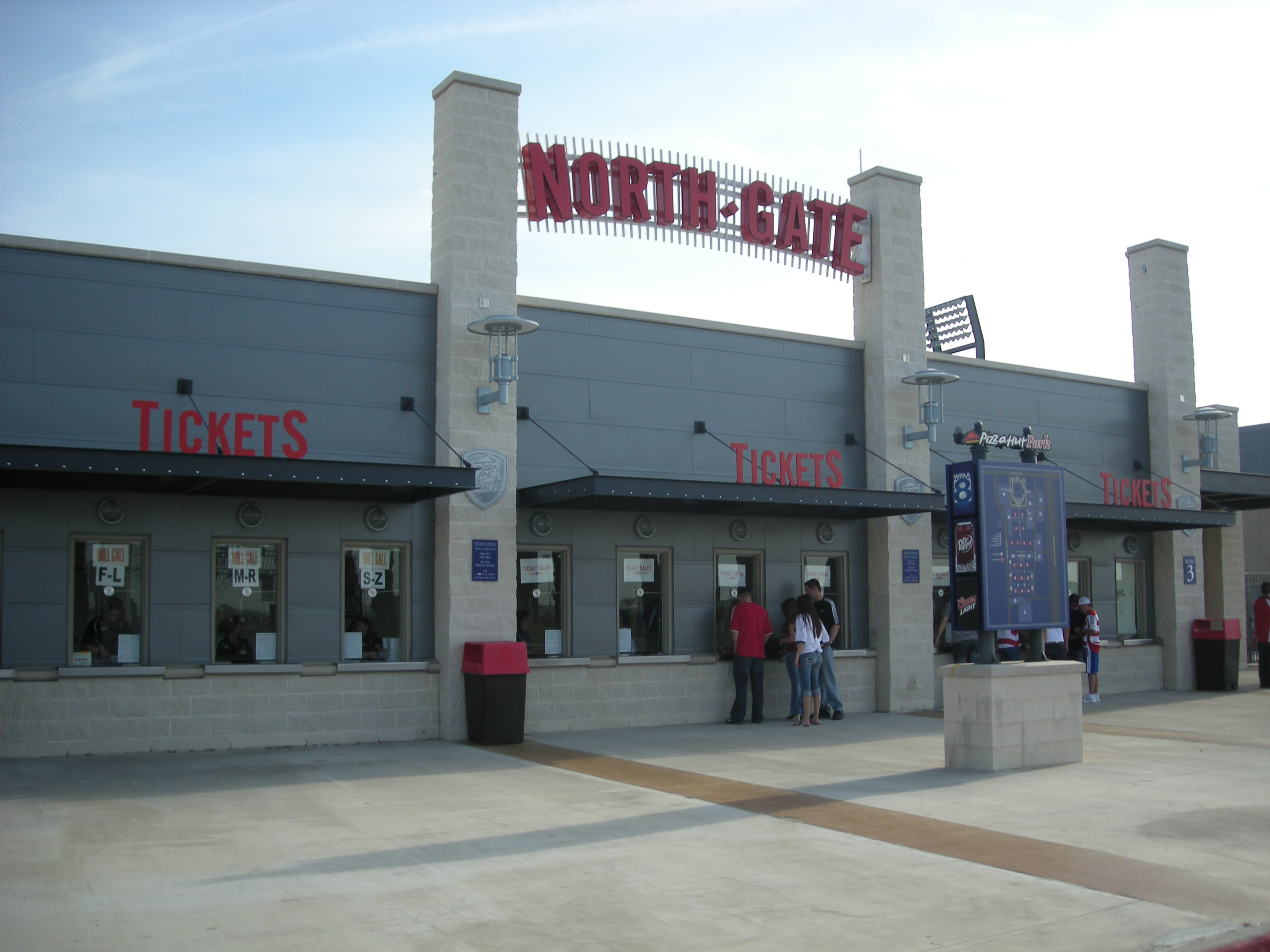

== See also ==
- List of sports venues with the name Toyota
- Lists of stadiums

== Notes ==
Events and tenants
Preceded by Cotton Bowl	Home of FC Dallas; 2005–present	Succeeded by current
Preceded by The Home Depot Center	Host of the MLS Cup; 2005, 2006	Succeeded by RFK Stadium
Preceded by Finley Stadium	Host of the NCAA Division I Football Championship; 2010–present	Succeeded by current
Preceded by SAS Soccer Park	Host of the College Cup; 2008	Succeeded by WakeMed Soccer Park
Preceded by Choctaw Stadium	Home of the Dallas Renegades; 2026-present	Succeeded by current
