= Tammy Graham (album) =

Studio album by Tammy Graham
- Released: April 29, 1997
- Genre: Country
- Length: 33:01
- Label: Career Records #18842
- Producer: Barry Beckett

Tammy Graham is the only studio album by American country music artist Tammy Graham. It was released on April 29, 1997, via Career Records, a division of Arista Nashville. The album produced the singles "Tell Me Again", "A Dozen Red Roses" and "Cool Water".

== Critical reception ==
The album was met with mixed reviews. Jeffrey B. Remz of Country Standard Time compared her vocals to those of Wynonna Judd and Trisha Yearwood, but said that besides "Cool Water," the album was "middle of the road." New Country magazine gave it one-and-a-half stars out of five, with Brian Mansfield criticizing Graham for singing "straight over the top" on every song.

== Track listing ==
No.	Title	Writer(s)	Length
1.	"I Stopped Looking"	Roger Dillon, Bruce Miller	3:07
2.	"Tell Me Again"	Walt Aldridge, Terry McBride	3:23
3.	"When the Blues and My Baby Collide"	Bob DiPiero, Paul Nelson	3:17
4.	"More About Love"	Bill Anderson, Gary Nicholson	3:28
5.	"Old Heartaches"	Larry Cordle, Larry Shell, Billy Henderson	3:09
6.	"Little by Little"	Paul Harrison, Bob McDill	3:05
7.	"A Dozen Red Roses"	Carrie Folks, John Greenebaum, Archie Jordan	3:05
8.	"Cool Water"	DiPiero, Wendell Mobley	3:42
9.	"Turnin' Up the Sad Song"	Shara Johnson, John Ramey, Bobby Taylor	3:57
10.	"Houdini"	Mark Narmore, Mark D. Sanders, Bobby Tomberlin	2:43

== Personnel ==
Compiled from liner notes.

=== Musicians ===
- Eddie Bayers — drums
- Barry Beckett — keyboards
- Paul Franklin — steel guitar
- Terry McMillan — percussion
- Phil Naish — keyboards
- Bobby Ogdin — keyboards
- Don Potter — acoustic guitar
- Michael Rhodes — bass guitar
- Brent Rowan — electric guitar
- John Wesley Ryles — background vocals
- Joe Spivey — fiddle
- Harry Stinson — background vocals
- Dennis Wilson — background vocals
- Curtis "Mr. Harmony" Young — background vocals

=== Production ===
- Barry Beckett — producer
- Pete Greene — recording
- Brian K. Lee — mastering
- Czaba Petocz — recording

== Chart performance ==
=== Album ===
Chart (1997)	Peak position
U.S. Billboard Top Country Albums	47
U.S. Billboard Top Heatseekers	41
