= What I Did for Love (disambiguation) =

"What I Did for Love" is a song from the musical A Chorus Line.

What I Did for Love may also refer to:

- "What I Did for Love" (David Guetta song), 2015
- "What I Did for Love", a song and single by Kenny Rogers from Love Is Strange 1990
- What I did for Love, a 1998 French film starring Raquel Welch
