= A Dozen Red Roses =

Single by Tammy Graham

from the album Tammy Graham
- B-side: "Tell Me Again"
- Released: March 22, 1997
- Genre: Country
- Length: 3:05
- Label: Career
- Songwriters: Archie Jordan, John Greenebaum, Carrie Folks
- Producer: Barry Beckett

Tammy Graham singles chronology
"Tell Me Again" (1997)	"A Dozen Red Roses" (1997)	"Cool Water" (1997)

"A Dozen Red Roses" is a song recorded by American country music artist Tammy Graham. It was released in March 1997 as the second single from the album Tammy Graham. The song reached #37 on the Billboard Hot Country Singles & Tracks chart. The song was written by Archie Jordan, John Greenebaum and Carrie Folks.

Joan Kennedy also recorded the song on her 1997 album of the same name.

== Critical reception ==
A review in Billboard of Graham's version was favorable, stating that it "is a real tear jerker in the finest country tradition" while praising her voice.

== Chart performance ==
=== Tammy Graham ===
Chart (1997)	Peak position
US Hot Country Songs (Billboard)	37
US Bubbling Under Hot 100 (Billboard)	8

=== Joan Kennedy ===
Chart (1997)	Peak position
Canada Country Tracks (RPM)	19
