= Crazy Love =

Crazy Love may refer to:

== Film and television ==
- Crazy Love (1979 film), an Argentine film directed by Eva Landeck
- Crazy Love (1987 film), a Belgian film directed by Dominique Deruddere
- Crazy Love (1993 film), a Hong Kong film directed by Roman Cheung
- Crazy Love (2007 film), a documentary about Burt Pugach directed by Dan Klores and Fisher Stevens
- Crazy Love (2014 film), a Chinese romantic comedy film directed by Cong Yi
- Crazy Love (2013 TV series), a South Korean television series
- Crazy Love (2022 TV series), a South Korean television series
- "Crazy Love" (Shameless), a television episode

== Literature ==
- Crazy Love: Overwhelmed by a Relentless God, a 2008 Christian book by Francis Chan
- Crazy Love, a 2006 children's book by Eric Brown
- Crazy Love, a 2009 memoir by Leslie Morgan Steiner

== Music ==
=== Albums ===
- Crazy Love (Hawk Nelson album) or the title song, 2011
- Crazy Love (Michael Bublé album) or the title cover of the Van Morrison song (see below), 2009
- Crazy Love, by Honey Is Cool, 1997

=== Songs ===
- "Crazy Love" (Allman Brothers song), 1979
- "Crazy Love" (CeCe Peniston song), 1992
- "Crazy Love" (MJ Cole song), 2000
- "Crazy Love" (Paul Anka song), 1958
- "Crazy Love" (Poco song), 1979
- "Crazy Love" (Van Morrison song), 1970
- "Crazy Love", by Adam Sandler from What the Hell Happened to Me?, 1996
- "Crazy Love", by Bon Jovi from 100,000,000 Bon Jovi Fans Can't Be Wrong, 2004
- "Crazy Love", by Frank Sinatra from This Is Sinatra Volume 2, 1958
- "Crazy Love", by Gruntruck from Push, 1992
- "Crazy Love", by Kim Chiu, 2007
- "Crazy Love", by Lady Antebellum from Ocean, 2019
- "Crazy Love", by Laura Nyro from Nested, 1978
- "Crazy Love", by Lodovica Comello from Mariposa, 2015
- "Crazy Love", by Luther Vandross from Your Secret Love, 1996
- "Crazy Love", by Mara feat. Beto Perez from Zumba Fitness - Dance Party Vol. 2, 2012
- "Crazy Love", by Ne-Yo from Libra Scale, 2010
- "Crazy Love, Vol. II", by Paul Simon from Graceland, 1986

== See also ==
- Crazy in Love (disambiguation)
