= Dream On (Joan Kennedy song) =

Single by Joan Kennedy

from the album Higher Ground
- Released: 1993
- Genre: Country
- Length: 3:57
- Label: MCA
- Songwriters: Gary Burr; Harry Stinson
- Producer: Mike Francis

Joan Kennedy singles chronology
"Breakin' All Over Town" (1993)	"Dream On" (1993)	"Circle of Love" (1994)

"Dream On" is a song recorded by Canadian country music artist Joan Kennedy. It was released in 1993 as the fourth single from her fifth studio album, Higher Ground (1992). It peaked at number 9 on the RPM Country Tracks chart in December 1993.

== Chart performance ==
Chart (1993)	Peak position
Canada Country Singles (RPM)	9

=== Year-end charts ===
Chart (1993)	Position
Canada Country Tracks (RPM)	88
