= I Couldn't See You Leavin' =

Single by Conway Twitty

from the album Crazy in Love
- B-side: "Just the Thought of Losing You"
- Released: December 1990
- Genre: Country
- Length: 2:50
- Label: MCA
- Songwriters: Rory Bourke; Ronny Scaife
- Producers: Jimmy Bowen; Don Henry; Conway Twitty

Conway Twitty singles chronology
"Crazy in Love" (1990)	"I Couldn't See You Leavin'" (1990)	"One Bridge I Didn't Burn" (1991)

"I Couldn't See You Leavin'" is a song written by Ronnie Scaife and Rory Bourke, and recorded by American country music artist Conway Twitty. It was released in December 1990 as the second single from his album Crazy in Love. The song reached #3 on the Billboard Hot Country Singles & Tracks chart in 1991. It was Conway's final Top 10 hit.

== Chart performance ==
Chart (1990–1991)	Peak position
Canada Country Singles (RPM)	3
US Hot Country Songs (Billboard)	3

=== Year-end charts ===
Chart (1991)	Position
Canada Country Tracks (RPM)	56
US Country Songs (Billboard)	24
