= Tammy Graham =

American singer-songwriter

- Born: Tammy Wynette Graham; February 7, 1968 (age 58)
- Origin: Little Rock, Arkansas, United States
- Genres: Country
- Occupation: Singer
- Instruments: Vocals piano
- Years active: 1996–1997
- Label: Career/Arista Nashville

Tammy Wynette Graham (born February 7, 1968) is an American country music artist. Active as a singer and self-taught pianist since childhood, she first gained attention in her hometown before moving to Las Vegas and subsequently to Nashville, where she was signed to a recording contract with a division of Arista Nashville in 1997, releasing a studio album and charting three singles on the Billboard country music charts that year, including the No. 37-peaking "A Dozen Red Roses".

== Biography ==
Graham was born in Little Rock, Arkansas. She taught herself how to play the piano at an early age. In addition to winning several local talent competitions (some while she was nine years old), she demonstrated piano playing at a music store located in a Little Rock shopping mall.

By age fourteen, Graham began billing herself as "Little Miss Jerry Lee Lewis". She had also formed a backing band, with whom she toured in both Nashville and Las Vegas; although she recorded several demos while in Nashville, she did not attract the attention of any record labels at the time. While still in her late teenage years, Graham found work at Caesars Palace, where she soon became a regular; eventually, she was discovered by Danny Morrison, who served as a manager for country singer Joe Diffie at the time. Morrison then recommended Graham to the head of Career Records, a now-defunct division of the Arista Nashville record label.

Graham was signed to a recording contract with Career in 1996, with her debut single "Tell Me Again" being released that year; it peaked at No. 63 on the Billboard Hot Country Singles & Tracks (now Hot Country Songs) charts. Her second single, "A Dozen Red Roses", became her only Top 40 hit, with a number 37 country peak and number 8 Bubbling Under Hot 100 peak. By April 1997, she had released her self-titled album. "Cool Water", the third and final single, reached its high point at number 59 on the country charts. Graham was later dropped from Career when the label was merged into Arista Nashville's main division, and has not recorded since.

== Discography ==
=== Albums ===
Title	Album details	Peak chart positions	
Title	Album details	US Country	US Heat
Tammy Graham	Release date: April 29, 1997; Label: Career Records	47	41

=== Singles ===
Year	Single	Peak chart positions			Album
Year	Single	US Country	US Bubbling	CAN Country	Album
1996	"Tell Me Again"	63	—	—	Tammy Graham
1997	"A Dozen Red Roses"	37	8	—	Tammy Graham
1997	"Cool Water"	59	—	89	Tammy Graham
"—" denotes releases that did not chart

=== Music videos ===
Year	Video
1996	"Tell Me Again"
1997	"A Dozen Red Roses"
