= Crazy in Love (Joe Cocker song) =

Song first released in 1984

Single by Kim Carnes

from the album View from the House
- B-side: "Blood from the Bandit"
- Released: 1988
- Recorded: 1988; Sound Stage Studios (Nashville, Tennessee)
- Length: 3:52
- Label: MCA
- Songwriters: Randy McCormick; Even Stevens
- Producers: Jimmy Bowen; Kim Carnes

Kim Carnes singles chronology
"Speed of the Sound of Loneliness" (1988)	"Crazy in Love" (1988)	"Just to Spend Tonight with You" (1988)

Music video
- "Crazy in Love" on YouTube

Licensed audio
- "Crazy in Love" on YouTube

"Crazy in Love"

Single by Conway Twitty

from the album Crazy in Love
- B-side: "Heart's Breakin' All Over Town"
- Released: August 1990
- Genre: Country
- Length: 3:47
- Label: MCA
- Songwriters: Randy McCormick; Even Stevens
- Producers: Jimmy Bowen; Dee Henry; Conway Twitty

Conway Twitty singles chronology
"Fit to Be Tied Down" (1990)	"Crazy in Love" (1990)	"I Couldn't See You Leavin'" (1990)

"Crazy in Love" is a song by songwriters Even Stevens and Randy McCormick; it was first recorded by English singer Joe Cocker on his 1984 album Civilized Man. The song was covered by American pop artist Kim Carnes in 1988 and released as the second single from her album View from the House. Carnes' version peaked at number 13 on the Billboard Adult Contemporary chart and number 68 on the Billboard Hot Country Singles & Tracks chart.

The song was covered by American country music artist Conway Twitty for his 1990 album Crazy in Love. It was released in August 1990 as the first single from the album. Twitty's version reached number two on the Billboard Hot Country Singles & Tracks chart in November 1990 and number one on the Cashbox country charts, making it the last song of Twitty's to hit number one on a national chart.

Kenny Rogers also covered the song in 1990 for his album Love Is Strange. Released as the album's second single, Rogers' version peaked at number 9 on the Billboard Adult Contemporary chart.

Julio Iglesias covered this song in 1998 on his album My Life: The Greatest Hits.

== Chart performance ==
=== Kim Carnes ===
Chart (1988)	Peak position
US Adult Contemporary (Billboard)	13
US Hot Country Songs (Billboard)	68
Australia (ARIA Charts)	162

=== Conway Twitty ===
Chart (1990)	Peak position
Canada Country Singles (RPM)	4
US Hot Country Songs (Billboard)	2

=== Kenny Rogers ===
Chart (1990)	Peak position
US Adult Contemporary (Billboard)	9
Canadian RPM Adult Contemporary Tracks	9
Canadian RPM Top Singles	77
