= Joan Kennedy (singer) =

- Origin: Douglas Harbour, New Brunswick, Canada
- Genres: Country
- Occupation: singer
- Instruments: Vocals, acoustic guitar
- Years active: 1984–present
- Labels: MBS; Destiny; MCA Canada; JKP
- Website: www.joankennedymusic.com

Joan Kennedy (born in Douglas Harbour, New Brunswick, Canada) is a country music singer. She came to fame after winning the Canadian National Talent Contest in 1983 and issued her first album, I'm a Big Girl Now, the following year in 1984. After two more albums in 1985 and 1987, she signed with MCA Records and issued two albums, 1990's Candle in the Window and 1992's Higher Ground. In 1996, Kennedy released A Dozen Red Roses, a greatest hits album. During the early 1990s, she had her own syndicated weekly television show in Canada. She now resides in Portland, Maine.

== Discography ==
=== Albums ===
Title	Details	Peak positions
Title	Details	CAN Country
I'm a Big Girl Now	Release date: 1984; Label: MBS	—
A Christmas to Remember	Release date: 1985; Label: WRC	—
Family Pride	Release date: 1987; Label: Destiny	—
Candle in the Window	Release date: 1990; Label: MCA Records	26
Higher Ground	Release date: 1992; Label: MCA Records	24
A Dozen Red Roses	Release date: 1996; Label: JKP	—
My Roots	Release date: December 2015; Label: JKP	—
"—" denotes releases that did not chart

=== Singles ===
Year	Single	Peak positions	Album
Year	Single	CAN Country	Album
1984	"I'm a Big Girl Now"	—	I'm a Big Girl Now
1984	"You're a Stranger"	—	I'm a Big Girl Now
1985	"If I'm Wrong"	—	I'm a Big Girl Now
1986	"Tell the Boys No"	—	Family Pride
1987	"Family Pride"	52	Family Pride
1987	"Don't Look in My Eyes"	—	Family Pride
1988	"This Time"	—	Family Pride
1988	"Mothers and Daughters"	—	Family Pride
1988	"Sweet Nothin's"	87	Family Pride
1990	"The Trouble with Love"	45	Candle in the Window
1991	"Just Can't Let Go"	21	Candle in the Window
1991	"I Never Met a Liar (I Didn't Like)"	9	Candle in the Window
1991	"Candle in the Window"	15	Candle in the Window
1992	"Sometimes She Feels Like a Man"	21	Candle in the Window
1992	"If You Want Love"	15	Candle in the Window
1992	"I Need to Hear It from You"	9	Higher Ground
1993	"Talk to My Heart"	7	Higher Ground
1993	"Breakin' All Over Town"	9	Higher Ground
1993	"Dream On"	9	Higher Ground
1994	"Circle of Love"	18	Higher Ground
1994	"You Said It"	30	Higher Ground
1996	"Wild and Free"	15	A Dozen Red Roses
1997	"A Dozen Red Roses"	19	A Dozen Red Roses
1997	"Promised Land"	52	A Dozen Red Roses
1998	"Working Man's Daughter"	—	A Dozen Red Roses
2015	"Yeeha Hallelujah"	—	My Roots
"—" denotes releases that did not chart

=== Music videos ===
Year	Video	Director
1991	"Candle in the Window"	
1993	"Talk to My Heart"	Jim Spitler
1997	"A Dozen Red Roses"	
1998	"Promised Land"	Alain Ouellette
1998	"Working Man's Daughter"	Alain Ouellette
2015	"Yeeha Hallelujah"	
