= Candle in the Window =

Studio album by Joan Kennedy
- Released: 1990
- Genre: Country
- Label: MCA
- Producer: Mike Francis

Joan Kennedy chronology
Family Pride (1987)	Candle in the Window (1990)	Higher Ground (1992)

Candle in the Window is the fourth studio album by Canadian country music artist Joan Kennedy. It was released by MCA Records in 1990. The album peaked at number 26 on the RPM Country Albums chart.

== Track listing ==
1. "The Trouble with Love"
2. "Sometimes She Feels Like a Man"
3. "Spanish Is a Loving Tongue"
4. "If You Want Love"
5. "Some People Belong Together"
6. "Wild Again"
7. "God's Green Earth"
8. "Just Can't Let Go"
9. "I Never Met a Liar (I Didn't Like)"
10. "Candle in the Window"

== Chart performance ==
Chart (1990)	Peak position
Canadian RPM Country Albums	26
