= Talk to My Heart =

Single by Joan Kennedy

from the album Higher Ground
- Released: 1993
- Genre: Country
- Length: 3:34
- Label: MCA
- Songwriters: Mark D. Sanders; David Roger Allen
- Producer: Mike Francis

Joan Kennedy singles chronology
"I Need to Hear It from You" (1992)	"Talk to My Heart" (1993)	"Breakin' All Over Town" (1993)

"Talk to My Heart" is a song recorded by Canadian country music artist Joan Kennedy. It was released in 1993 as the second single from her fifth studio album, Higher Ground. It peaked at number 7 on the RPM Country Tracks chart in June 1993.

== Chart performance ==
Chart (1993)	Peak position
Canada Country Singles (RPM)	7

=== Year-end charts ===
Chart (1993)	Position
Canada Country Tracks (RPM)	80
