= Speed of the Sound of Loneliness =

Single by Kim Carnes

from the album View from the House
- B-side: "Blood from the Bandit"
- Released: 1988
- Genre: Country
- Length: 3:26
- Label: MCA
- Songwriter: John Prine
- Producers: Jimmy Bowen; Kim Carnes

Kim Carnes singles chronology
"I'd Lie to You for Your Love" (1986)	"Speed of the Sound of Loneliness" (1988)	"Crazy in Love" (1988)

Licensed audio
- "Speed of the Sound of Loneliness" on YouTube

"Speed of the Sound of Loneliness" is a song written by American singer-songwriter John Prine and originally recorded on his 1986 album German Afternoons. The song was later covered by American singer-songwriter Kim Carnes, who released it as a single from her 1988 album View from the House. Carnes' version reached number 70 on the Billboard Hot Country Songs chart. The song gained further fame with a duet recording by Prine and American singer Nanci Griffith on the latter's 1993 album Other Voices, Other Rooms and the release of the track as a single.

== Other versions ==
The song has been covered by many, including British band Alabama 3 on their 1997 album Exile on Coldharbour Lane, as well as American singer-songwriter Jeffrey Foucault in 2009 on his Prine tribute album Shoot the Moon Right Between the Eyes. Irish singer Susan McCann recorded a version in the early 90s along with a video and also included the track on her 2016 compilation album Through The Years. Scottish singer Roddy Woomble recorded a live version in 2014 on his album Live at Kings Place. The Lemonheads included a version of it on their 2019 album Varshons 2. Dave Matthews performed it live from his home studio as a tribute to Prine on The Late Show with Stephen Colbert on April 9, 2020. The track also appears on Kurt Vile's extended play Speed, Sound, Lonely KV, released in October 2020.

== Chart performance ==
Chart (1988)	Peak position
US Hot Country Songs (Billboard)	70
