= View from the House =

Studio album by Kim Carnes
- Released: July 25, 1988
- Recorded: 1988
- Studio: Sound Stage Studios, Emerald Sound Studios, Manzanita Recording Studio and Masterfonics (Nashville, Tennessee); Galaxy Sound Studios and A&M Studios (Hollywood, California)
- Genre: Country, adult contemporary
- Length: 38:37
- Label: MCA
- Producer: Kim Carnes and Jimmy Bowen; ("Crimes of the Heart" produced by Kim Carnes, Jimmy Bowen and Bill Cuomo)

Kim Carnes chronology
Light House (1986)	View from the House (1988)	Checkin' Out the Ghosts (1991)

Singles from View from the House
- 1. "Crazy in Love" Released: 1988; 2. "Speed of the Sound of Loneliness" Released: 1988; 3. "Just to Spend Tonight with You" Released: 1988; 4. "Fantastic Fire of Love" Released: 1989

View from the House is the eleventh studio album by American singer-songwriter Kim Carnes. It was released on July 25, 1988, by MCA Records. The album marked a return to her early country music roots. Carnes recorded the album in Nashville, Tennessee, and co-produced the album with Jimmy Bowen.

View from the House received positive reviews, with music critics praising Carnes's cover songs. The album reached number 39 on the Billboard Top Country Albums chart, and contained two hit singles. "Crazy in Love" and "Speed of the Sound of Loneliness" both charted on the Billboard Hot Country Singles & Tracks at number 68 and number 70 respectively. "Crazy in Love" also reached number 13 on the Adult Contemporary chart.

== Background ==
Prior to making the album, Carnes stated, "I can't do another album here (in Los Angeles). I've tried and finally stopped. The only way I get a thrill out of recording is to record live as opposed to running everything through a computer. I want to feel that interplay between musicians. And I feel real strongly that Nashville is the place to make an album with real instruments."

Carnes had been interested in the Nashville music scene since 1981, after hearing Rosanne Cash's album Seven Year Ache. Carnes wanted to work with Jimmy Bowen, who produced her debut album, Rest on Me, in 1971.

Carnes chose to record a cover of "If You Don't Want My Love" by John Prine. The head of A&R at MCA suggested to Carnes that she also record Prine's song "Speed of the Sound of Loneliness". "Who thinks of that?" Carnes said. "The speed of the sound of loneliness? Lyrically, that blew me away."

Carnes wrote "Blood from the Bandit", with Donna Weiss, as a reflection on "pollution, greed, and other conditions afflicting the world". "The song is still pertinent today, more so, maybe," Carnes said in 2017. "What was being talked about then is on steroids now."

== Critical reception ==
Professional ratings
Review scores
Source	Rating
AllMusic	3/5 stars
The Encyclopedia of Popular Music	4/5 stars

Ralph Novak of People stated that Carnes sounds "Wonderfully relaxed and justifiably pleased with herself", noting the album's ten "generally splendid tunes" including the "convincingly romantic" cover of "Crazy in Love". AllMusic retrospectively described the album as "[a return] to the folk and country music of her earlier years." In the Honolulu Advertiser, Mike Cidoni described View from the House as a "grown-up departure from [her] techno-pop style of the early 80s". Hugh Wyatt of the New York Daily News likened Carnes' vocal performance on "Just to Spend Tonight with You" to that of Bob Dylan. He described her voice as "intoxicating" and highlighted "Blood from the Bandit" as a "brilliant, insightful tune about greed".

== Promotion ==
=== Singles ===
Four singles were released from View from the House. The first US single was "Speed of the Sound of Loneliness", which charted at number 70 on the Billboard Hot Country Songs chart. The second single, "Crazy in Love", first recorded by Joe Cocker in 1984, reached number 68 on the Billboard Hot Country Songs chart, and reached number 13 on the Billboard Adult Contemporary chart. The third single, "Just to Spend Tonight with You", was released in the United Kingdom, though did not chart. The fourth single, "Fantastic Fire of Love", was released in 1989.

== Track listing ==
No.	Title	Writer(s)	Producer(s)	Length
1.	"Brass & Batons"	Kim Carnes; Donna Weiss	Jimmy Bowen; Carnes	5:19
2.	"Just to Spend Tonight with You"	Carnes; Weiss	Bowen; Carnes	4:48
3.	"Heartbreak Radio"	Troy Seals; Frankie Miller	Bowen; Carnes	3:16
4.	"Crazy in Love"	Even Stevens; Randy McCormick	Bowen; Carnes	3:52
5.	"If You Don't Want My Love"	John Prine; Phil Spector	Bowen; Carnes	3:15
6.	"Willie and the Hand Jive"	Johnny Otis	Bowen; Carnes	4:05
7.	"Speed of the Sound of Loneliness"	Prine	Bowen; Carnes	3:26
8.	"Blood from the Bandit"	Carnes; Weiss	Bowen; Carnes	3:17
9.	"Fantastic Fire of Love"	Carnes	Bowen; Carnes	4:12
10.	"Crimes of the Heart"	Carnes; Weiss	Bowen; Carnes; Bill Cuomo	3:07
Total length:				38:37

== Personnel ==
- Kim Carnes – vocals, synthesizers (1)
- John Barlow Jarvis – acoustic piano (1–9), synthesizers (1–9)
- Bruce Hornsby – accordion (1)
- John Cascella – accordion (2, 3, 7)
- Bill Cuomo – synthesizers (10), drum programming (10)
- Craig Hull – electric guitar, slide guitar
- Josh Leo – electric guitar
- Billy Joe Walker, Jr. – electric guitar, acoustic guitar
- Mark O'Connor – mandolin, mandola, fiddle
- Leland Sklar – bass
- Craig Krampf – drums, percussion, washboard (3)
- Kirk "Jellyroll" Johnson – harmonica
- Vince Gill – harmony vocals (3)
- Steve Wariner – harmony vocals (5)
- Dave Ellingson – harmony vocals (6, 9)
- Lyle Lovett – harmony vocals (7)

Technical

- Bob Bullock – recording engineer, overdub recording, mixing
- Bill Cuomo – recording engineer (10)
- Spence Chrislu – second engineer
- Mark J. Coddington – second engineer
- Russ Martin – second engineer, overdub recording
- Bob Vogt – second engineer
- Bill Dooley – additional engineer
- Richard Bosworth – additional overdub recording
- Chuck Ainlay – mixing
- Niko Bolas – mixing
- Jimmy Bowen – mixing
- George Marino – mastering at Sterling Sound (New York City, New York)

Production

- Sue McGonigle – production assistant
- Jessie Noble – project coordinator
- Simon Levy – art direction
- Jerry Joyner – design
- Peter Nash – photography

== Charts ==
Chart (1988)	Peak position
Swedish Albums (Sverigetopplistan)	47
US Billboard Top Country Albums	36
