= I Need to Hear It from You =

Single by Joan Kennedy

from the album Higher Ground
- Released: 1992
- Genre: Country
- Length: 2:59
- Label: MCA
- Songwriters: Thom McHugh; Bob Millard
- Producer: Mike Francis

Joan Kennedy singles chronology
| "If You Want Love" (1992) | "I Need to Hear It from You" (1992) | "Talk to My Heart" (1993) |

"I Need to Hear It from You" is a song recorded by Canadian country music artist Joan Kennedy. It was released in 1992 as the first single from her fifth studio album, Higher Ground. It peaked at number 9 on the RPM Country Tracks chart in February 1993.

== Chart performance ==
| Chart (1992–1993) | Peak position |
|---|---|
| Canada Country Singles (RPM) | 9 |
