= Higher Ground (Joan Kennedy album) =

Studio album by Joan Kennedy
- Released: 1992
- Genre: Country
- Length: 37:16
- Label: MCA
- Producer: Mike Francis

Joan Kennedy chronology
Candle in the Window (1990)	Higher Ground (1992)	A Dozen Red Roses (1996)

Higher Ground is the fifth studio album by Canadian country music artist Joan Kennedy. It was released by MCA Records in 1992. The album peaked at number 24 on the RPM Country Albums chart.

== Track listing ==
1. "You Said It" – 3:08
2. "I Need to Hear It from You" – 2:59
3. "Dream On" – 3:57
4. "I've Seen Enough to Know" – 3:20
5. "Breakin' All Over Town" – 3:05
6. "Countin' on You This Time" – 3:45
7. "Talk to My Heart" – 3:34
8. "Appalachian Gold" – 2:44
9. "Circle of Love" – 4:03
10. "Love Is a Leap of Faith" – 2:26
11. "Higher Ground" – 4:15

== Chart performance ==
Chart (1992)	Peak position
Canadian RPM Country Albums	24
