= I Never Met a Liar (I Didn't Like) =

Single by Joan Kennedy

from the album Candle in the Window
- Released: 1991
- Genre: Country
- Length: 2:51
- Label: MCA
- Songwriters: Ron Hynes; Connie Hynes
- Producer: Mike Francis

Joan Kennedy singles chronology
"Just Can't Let Go" (1991)	"I Never Met a Liar (I Didn't Like)" (1991)	"Candle in the Window" (1991)

"I Never Met a Liar (I Didn't Like)" is a song recorded by Canadian country music artist Joan Kennedy. It was released in 1991 as the third single from her fourth studio album, Candle in the Window. It peaked at number 9 on the RPM Country Tracks chart in October 1991.

== Chart performance ==
Chart (1991)	Peak position
Canada Country Singles (RPM)	9
