= Even Now (Conway Twitty album) =

Studio album by Conway Twitty
- Released: March 8, 1991
- Recorded: August–December 1990
- Studio: Emerald Sound Studios, Nashville, TN
- Genre: Country
- Length: 33:15
- Label: MCA
- Producer: Dee Henry; Conway Twitty

Conway Twitty chronology
Crazy In Love (1990)	Even Now (1991)	Final Touches (1993)

Professional ratings
Review scores
Source	Rating
Allmusic	2.5/5 stars

Even Now is the fifty-sixth studio album by American country music singer Conway Twitty and the last to be released during his lifetime. It was released in 1991 on MCA Records, and includes the hits "She's Got a Man on Her Mind" and "Who Did They Think He Was".

"She's Got a Man on Her Mind" was previously released as a 1989 single by the co-writer Curtis Wright, reaching No. 38 on the Hot Country Songs chart on December 23, 1989. "Someday You'll Love Me" was later recorded by singer-songwriter Jeff Knight for his 1993 Mercury Records album Easy Street.

== Track listing ==
No.	Title	Writer(s)	Length
1.	"She's Got a Man on Her Mind"	Curtis Wright, Billy Spencer	2:58
2.	"Even Now"	Worley Max, Glenn Warren	3:14
3.	"Someday You'll Love Me"	Even Stevens, Hilary Kanter	3:24
4.	"She's in Love"	Rory Bourke, Mike Reid	3:04
5.	"You Put It There"	Donny Kees, Jimmy Jay, Richard Ross	2:50
6.	"Life's Too Short (No Matter How Long It Lasts)"	Bobby Fischer, Johnny MacRae, Richard Ross	3:45
7.	"Let the Pretty Lady Dance"	Will Jennings, Marshall Chapman	3:13
8.	"Every Time I Think It's Over"	Wood Newton, Danny Steagall, Red Steagall	3:56
9.	"It's Such a Heartache"	Stevens, Kanter	3:05
10.	"Who Did They Think He Was"	Richard Leigh, Pat McManus	3:46

== Production ==
- Produced By Conway Twitty & Dee Henry
- Engineer: Steve Tillisch
- Second Engineers: Jeff Coppage, Marty Williams
- Mixing: John Guess
- Digital Editing: Milan Bogdan
- Mastering: Glenn Meadows

== Personnel ==
- Drums: Paul Leim
- Bass Guitar: David Hungate
- Keyboards: John Barlow Jarvis
- Synthesizer: Mike Lawler
- Acoustic Guitar: Pat Flynn, Billy Joe Walker Jr.
- Electric Guitar: Billy Joe Walker Jr.
- Lead Vocals: Conway Twitty
- Backing Vocals: Vince Gill, Even Stevens (track 9), Curtis Young
