= On My Way to You =

Single by Cody Johnson

from the album Ain't Nothin' to It
- Released: August 10, 2018
- Genre: Neotraditional country
- Length: 3:33
- Label: Warner Music Nashville
- Songwriters: Brett James; Tony Lane
- Producer: Trent Willmon

Cody Johnson singles chronology
"Wild as You" (2017)	"On My Way to You" (2018)	"Nothin' on You" (2019)

"On My Way to You" is a song written by Brett James and Tony Lane, and recorded by American country music singer Cody Johnson. It is the first single from his seventh studio album Ain't Nothin' to It.

== Background ==
The song was written by Brett James and Tony Lane. It is Johnson's first song released under a major label.

== Music video ==
A video for the song, directed by Sean Hagwell, was released in October 2018.

== Commercial performance ==
The song has sold 107,000 copies in the United States as of April 2019.

== Charts ==
=== Weekly charts ===
Chart (2018–2019)	Peak position
Canada Country (Billboard)	20
US Billboard Hot 100	78
US Hot Country Songs (Billboard)	13
US Country Airplay (Billboard)	11

=== Year-end charts ===
Chart (2018)	Position
US Hot Country Songs (Billboard)	97

Chart (2019)	Position
US Country Airplay (Billboard)	34
US Hot Country Songs (Billboard)	27

== Certifications ==
Region	Certification	Certified units/sales
Canada (Music Canada)	Gold	40,000^{‡}
United States (RIAA)	2× Platinum	2,000,000^{‡}
^{‡} Sales+streaming figures based on certification alone.
