= Crazy in Love (Conway Twitty album) =

Studio album by Conway Twitty
- Released: February 2, 1990
- Recorded: July–November 1989
- Studio: Emerald Sound Studios, Sound Stage Studios, Nashville, Tennessee
- Genre: Country
- Length: 33:03
- Label: MCA
- Producer: Jimmy Bowen (tracks 2,8,10); Dee Henry (all tracks); Conway Twitty (all tracks)

Conway Twitty chronology
Greatest Hits Volume III (1990)	Crazy in Love (1990)	Even Now (1991)

Professional ratings
Review scores
Source	Rating
AllMusic	2/5 stars

Crazy in Love is the fifty-fifth studio album by American country music artist Conway Twitty. It was released in 1990 on MCA Records, and included a pair of top three hits, one in the title track, and the other in the song "I Couldn't See You Leavin'".

"Shadow of a Distant Friend" is a cover of a Waylon Jennings song titled, "The Shadow of Your Distant Friend" from his 1986 album, Will the Wolf Survive. "Just the Thought of Losing You" was originally recorded by Kenny Rogers on his 1986 album, They Don't Make Them Like They Used To.

== Track listing ==
No.	Title	Writer(s)	Length
1.	"A Little Bit of You"	Walt Aldridge	3:47
2.	"Crazy in Love"	Randy McCormick, Even Stevens	3:47
3.	"When You're in Love with a Beautiful Woman"	Stevens	2:43
4.	"I'm Tired of Being Something (That Means Nothing to You)"	LaDonna Brewer	3:00
5.	"What's Another Goodbye"	Kent Robbins	3:41
6.	"Shadow of a Distant Friend"	Roger Murrah, Steve Dean	3:36
7.	"One Bridge I Didn't Burn"	Dean, Jim McBride	3:38
8.	"I Couldn't See You Leavin'"	Rory Bourke, Ronny Scaife	2:50
9.	"Just the Thought of Losing You"	Michael Bolton, Jonathan Cain	3:27
10.	"Hearts Breakin' All Over Town"	Karen Staley, Pam Tillis	2:49

== Production ==
- Produced By Conway Twitty, Dee Henry & Jimmy Bowen
- Engineers: Dave Boyer, Tim Kish, Russ Martin, Ron Treat
- Overdubs Recorded By Ron Treat
- Mixing: Tom Perry
- Digital Editing: Milan Bogdan
- Mastering: Glenn Meadows

== Personnel ==
- Drums: Eddie Bayers
- Bass Guitar: Michael Rhodes
- Keyboards: John Barlow Jarvis, Larry Knechtel
- Synthesizer: Mike Lawler
- Acoustic Guitar: Pat Flynn, Billy Joe Walker Jr.
- Electric Guitar: Brent Rowan, Billy Joe Walker Jr.
- Mandolin: Pat Flynn
- Lead Vocals: Conway Twitty
- Backing Vocals: Harry Stinson, Curtis Young

== Chart performance ==
Chart (1990)	Peak position
U.S. Billboard Top Country Albums	35
