= Breakin' All Over Town =

Single by Joan Kennedy

from the album Higher Ground
- Released: 1993
- Genre: Country
- Length: 3:05
- Label: MCA
- Songwriters: Pam Tillis; Karen Staley
- Producer: Mike Francis

Joan Kennedy singles chronology
"Talk to My Heart" (1993)	"Breakin' All Over Town" (1993)	"Dream On" (1993)

"Breakin' All Over Town" is a song recorded by Canadian country music artist Joan Kennedy. It was released in 1993 as the third single from her fifth studio album, Higher Ground (1992). It peaked at number 9 on the RPM Country Tracks chart in September 1993.

The song was originally recorded by Conway Twitty for his 1990 album Crazy in Love as "Hearts Breakin' All Over Town".

== Chart performance ==
Chart (1993)	Peak position
Canada Country Singles (RPM)	9
