= Love Is Strange (album) =

Studio album by Kenny Rogers
- Released: September 11, 1990
- Recorded: 1990
- Studio: The Loft, Digital Recorders and Sixteenth Avenue Sound (Nashville, Tennessee); The Castle (Franklin, Tennessee)
- Genre: Country
- Length: 38:17
- Label: Reprise
- Producer: Jim Ed Norman; Eric Prestidge

Kenny Rogers chronology
| Christmas In America (1989) | Love Is Strange (1990) | Back Home Again (1991) |

Love Is Strange is the twenty-third studio album by American country music artist Kenny Rogers. It was released on September 11, 1990, by Reprise Records. The album includes the single "Love Is Strange", which charted at number 21 on Hot Country Songs that same year.

== Track listing ==
| No. | Title | Writer(s) | Length |
|---|---|---|---|
| 1. | "Love Is Strange" (duet with Dolly Parton) | Mickey Baker, Ellas McDaniel, Sylvia Robinson | 3:27 |
| 2. | "Soldier of Love" | Richard "Spady" Brannan, Anthony Crawford, David Malloy | 2:50 |
| 3. | "Listen to the Rain" | Skip Ewing, Don Sampson | 3:34 |
| 4. | "If I Were a Painting" | Ewing, Sampson | 3:44 |
| 5. | "Crazy in Love" | Randy McCormick, Even Stevens | 4:18 |
| 6. | "Lay My Body Down" | Joe Henry, Bob Morrison | 4:05 |
| 7. | "So Little Love in the World" | Michael Smotherman | 4:17 |
| 8. | "Walk Away" | Bob Carpenter, Tom Kell | 4:39 |
| 9. | "In Our Old Age" | Chaz Bosarge, Randy Hardison, Paul Hollowell | 3:55 |
| 10. | "What I Did for Love" | Brent Maher, Thom Schuyler | 3:28 |

== Personnel ==
From Love Is Strange liner notes.

- Kenny Rogers – lead vocals
- Matt Rollings – electric piano (1–3, 5, 6, 9), acoustic piano (4, 5, 7)
- Mike Lawler – synthesizers (1–5, 10)
- Phil Naish – synthesizers (1–3, 5–10)
- Larry Byrom – electric guitar (1), mandolin (2), acoustic guitar (3, 10)
- Steve Gibson – electric guitar (1, 2, 4–9), acoustic guitar (3, 7, 9, 10), mandolin (3, 10), gut-string guitar solo (3), sitar (10)
- John Hug – electric guitar (3), acoustic guitar (4–6, 9, 10)
- Bernie Leadon – acoustic guitar (3), mandola (4, 8), mandolin (10)
- Glenn Worf – bass (1, 2, 6, 8, 10)
- Michael Rhodes – bass (3–5, 9)
- Joe Chemay – bass (7)
- Paul Leim – drums (1, 2, 6, 7, 10), percussion (6, 8, 10)
- Eddie Bayers – drums (3, 5, 9)
- Terry McMillan – percussion (1, 2, 10)
- Jimmy Mattingly – fiddle (4)
- Bobby Taylor – English horn (5), oboe (8)
- Bergen White – string arrangements and conductor (4, 8)
- Carl Gorodetzky – concertmaster and contractor (4, 8)
- The Nashville String Machine – orchestra (4, 8)
- Chris Harris – backing vocals (1–9)
- Mark Heimermann – backing vocals (1–9)
- Gary Janney – backing vocals (1–9), harmony vocals (6, 10)
- Dolly Parton – lead vocals (1)
- Vince Gill – backing vocals (2, 10)
- Jim Photoglo – backing vocals (2, 10)
- Harry Stinson – backing vocals (2, 10)
- Jim "Val" Valentini – harmony vocals (2)
- Jennifer O'Brien-Enoch – soprano vocals (4)

== Production ==
- Jim Ed Norman – producer
- Eric Prestidge – producer, engineer, mixing, mastering
- Robert Tassi – assistant engineer
- Jim "Val" Valentini – assistant engineer
- Craig Hansen – additional engineer
- Daniel Johnston – additional engineer
- John Kunz – additional engineer
- John David Parker – additional engineer
- Keith Odle – digital multitrack editing at GroundStar Laboratories (Nashville, Tennessee)
- Glenn Meadows – mastering
- Masterfonics (Nashville, Tennessee) – mastering location
- Daniel Kee – production assistant
- Laura LiPuma – art direction
- Heather Horne – design
- Bernard Boudreau – photography
- Ken Kragen – management

== Chart performance ==
| Chart (1990) | Peak position |
|---|---|
| U.S. Billboard Top Country Albums | 21 |
| Australian (ARIA Charts) Albums | 155 |

== Singles ==
Love Is Strange is home to three singles. The title cut, a duet with Dolly Parton, debuted first and made it to number 21 in the U.S. and number 14 in Canada. The follow-up single, released in 1990, was "Lay My Body Down", which reached number 69 in the U.S. but did not chart in Canada. The final single, "What I Did For Love", written by Brent Maher and Tom Schuyler, did the opposite, charting only in Canada, peaking at number 81.
