= Carlton Anderson =

American singer-songwriter (born 1992)

- Born: July 1, 1992 (age 33); Cypress, Texas, U.S.
- Genres: Country
- Occupations: Singer, songwriter
- Instrument: Vocals
- Years active: 2018-present
- Label: Arista Nashville
- Website: carltonandersonmusic.com

Carlton Anderson (born July 1, 1992) is an American country music singer-songwriter, based in Nashville, Tennessee, United States.

== Career ==
Anderson grew up in Cypress, Texas, and attended Cy-Fair High School, before attending Belmont University and playing on Music City's Lower Broadway. As a kid he worked odd jobs at the grocery store and oil fields to earn money to buy a guitar and PA. Anderson’s musical influences begin with Willie Nelson, who he refers to as "his drug" as well as George Strait.

His 1990s influenced sound has brought him recognition with a new crop of country artists including Riley Green and Cody Johnson who Anderson has toured with in Nashville. He released a self titled EP in 2014 with the songs "Airplane" and "Forever".

He signed with Sony Nashville in 2018 and released a debut single on May 18 called "Drop Everything". The track was co-written by Rhett Akins, Matt Dragstrem, and Ashley Gorley.

He was named the Breakthrough Artist of the Week on 979KickFM on May 25. Anderson parted ways with Arista Nashville in September 2019.

== Discography ==
=== Extended plays ===
- ”Carlton Anderson” (Arista Nashville; 2019)

=== Singles ===
- "Drop Everything" (Sony Music Nashville; May 25, 2018)

=== Music videos ===
Year	Video	Director
2018	“Drop Everything”	Jeffrey C. Phillips
