= Arista Nashville =

American record label

- Parent company: Sony Music Entertainment
- Founded: 1989; 37 years ago
- Founder: Tim DuBois; Clive Davis
- Defunct: 2023
- Distributor: Sony Music Nashville (US)
- Genre: Country
- Country of origin: US
- Location: Nashville, Tennessee
- Official website: www.aristanashville.com

Arista Nashville was an American record label that served as a wholly owned division of Sony Music Entertainment, operated under the Sony Music Nashville division. Founded in 1989, the label specialized in country music artists, including Alan Jackson, Brooks & Dunn, Brad Paisley, and Carrie Underwood. The label had operated three sister labels: Career Records, Arista Austin, and Arista Texas/Latin.

== History ==
Prior to the formation of its Nashville branch, parent company Arista Records released recordings by Tanya Tucker and Jennifer Warnes in the country music market during the late 1970s and early 1980s. Plans for a Nashville branch of Arista were considered by label founder Clive Davis as early as 1980, but an industry slump at the time caused its delay. In 1989, Davis teamed with songwriter Tim DuBois to form Arista Nashville. The label's initial roster included Asleep at the Wheel, Alan Jackson, Lee Roy Parnell, Pam Tillis, and Michelle Wright.

Other artists who recorded on the label within its first five years included Blackhawk, Brooks & Dunn, Rob Crosby, Linda Davis, Diamond Rio, Exile, Radney Foster, Dude Mowrey, The Tractors, and Steve Wariner.

The label founded Arista Texas in 1993, a sub-label specializing in Texas music artists. In 1997, it was split into Arista Austin, which featured Jeff Black, Radney Foster, Robert Earl Keen, and Abra Moore, and a Spanish-language label called Arista Latin. Another sub-label, Career Records, was launched in 1995 with Lee Roy Parnell transferred to this label, while Brett James and Tammy Graham were newly signed to it. All three artists moved back to Arista Nashville when Career Records was dissolved. While Graham and James were dropped from it soon afterward, James re-signed to Arista Nashville between 2002 and 2003.

From 2005 to 2017, Arista Nashville, Arista Records, and 19 Recordings promoted and distributed recordings by American Idol winner Carrie Underwood.

In late 2009, Brad Paisley launched a personal label, Sea Gayle, which is distributed through Arista. The label's first signee was Jerrod Niemann.

During the years after the dissolution of Arista Records in 2011, Arista Nashville became Sony Music's only label using the Arista name until Sony re-launched Arista Records in July 2018.

In March 2023, Sony Music Nashville announced that the Arista Nashville label would close, with the existing roster transferring to other labels under Sony's ownership.

== Artist roster ==
- Brent Anderson
- Carlton Anderson
- Keith Anderson
- Asleep at the Wheel
- Sherrié Austin
- Ray Benson
- Adam Brand
- Blackhawk
- BR549
- Kix Brooks
- Brooks & Dunn
- Shannon Brown
- Cam
- Deana Carter
- Jason Michael Carroll
- Jim Collins
- Kristy Lee Cook
- Rob Crosby
- Clint Daniels
- Linda Davis
- Diamond Rio
- The Doobie Brothers
- Adam Doleac
- Ronnie Dunn
- Seth Ennis
- Exile
- Radney Foster
- The Henningsens
- Faith Hill
- Rebecca Lynn Howard
- Ryan Hurd
- Alan Jackson
- Brett James
- Carolyn Dawn Johnson
- Jypsi
- Kristen Kelly
- Lanco
- Tim McGraw
- Logan Mize
- Dude Mowrey
- Jerrod Niemann
- Old Dominion
- Brad Paisley
- Stephen Cochran
- Lee Roy Parnell
- Seaforth
- The Sisterhood
- Nate Smith
- Matt Stell
- The Swon Brothers
- Pam Tillis
- The Tractors
- Ryan Tyler
- Carrie Underwood
- Phil Vassar
- Morgan Wade
- Steve Wariner
- Calvin Wiggett
- Michelle Wright

=== Career Records ===
- Tammy Graham
- Brett James
- Lee Roy Parnell

=== Arista Austin ===
- Jeff Black
- Radney Foster
- Robert Earl Keen
- Abra Moore
- Sister 7
- Townes Van Zandt

== See also ==
- BNA Records
- RCA Records Nashville
- Columbia Nashville
- Sony Music Nashville
- Arista Records
